= Allan Deberton =

Brazilian filmmaker (born 1982)

- Deberton in 2026
- Born: 22 July 1982 (age 44); Russas, Ceará, Brazil
- Occupations: Filmmaker, producer
- Years active: 2010–present

Allan Deberton (born 22 July 1982) is a Brazilian filmmaker and producer. He is best known for his films set in Ceará, his home state, including Gugu's World (2026).

== Early life ==
Deberton was born in Russas, Ceará, on 22 July 1987. He graduated in Cinema from the Fluminense Federal University (UFF). Before dedicating himself to the production of audiovisual works, he also graduated in Accounting Sciences from the State University of Ceará. During the beginning of his career, he worked in film preservation at the Centro Técnico Audiovisual (CTAv).

== Career ==
Deberton began his filmmaking career around 2010, directing short films. Notable short films directed by Deberton during this period include Doce de Coco (2010), O Melhor Amigo (2013), and Os Olhos de Arthur (2016).

His first feature film Pacarrete (2019) follows a ballerina who tries at all costs to make the public see the true value of art. The film had its world premiere at the 2019 Shanghai International Film Festival.

The Best Friend (2024) had its world premiere at the MixBrasil Festival.

Gugu's World (2026) had its world premiere in the Generation Kplus section at the 76th Berlin International Film Festival on 13 February, where it won the Crystal Bear. It was chosen as Brazil's entry in the 99th Academy Awards.
