= If Pigeons Turned to Gold =

2026 Czech documentary film

- International promotional poster
- Czech: Kdyby se holubi proměnili ve zlato
- Directed by: Pepa Lubojacki
- Screenplay by: Pepa Lubojacki
- Produced by: Klára Mamojková; Wanda Kaprálová
- Starring: David Richter; Pepa Lubojacki; David Lubojacki; Marco Arnone
- Cinematography: Pepa Lubojacki; Tomáš Šťastný
- Edited by: Pepa Lubojacki
- Music by: Adam Matej
- Production companies: CLAW films; guča films
- Distributed by: Split Screen
- Release dates: 13 February 2026 (Berlinale); 24 September 2026 (Czech Republic)
- Running time: 110 minutes
- Countries: Czech Republic; Slovakia
- Languages: Czech; English

If Pigeons Turned to Gold (Czech: Kdyby se holubi proměnili ve zlato) is a 2026 documentary film written and directed by Pepa Lubojacki, in their debut film. A co-production between Czech Republic and Slovakia, it follows, over five years, the lives of Lubojacki's four relatives, including their brother David, who struggles with alcoholism and homelessness.

The film had its world premiere at Forum section of the 76th Berlin International Film Festival on 13 February 2026, where it won Berlinale Documentary Film Award. It will be theatrically released in Czech Republic by Split Screen on 24 September.

It was selected as the Czech entry for the Best International Feature Film at the 99th Academy Awards.

== Summary ==
The film follows director Pepa Lubojacki as they spend years filming their brother and cousins, who, like many people in their family, struggle with alcoholism and homelessness. They bind together cell phone clips, old family photos altered with artificial intelligence, electronic music, and even comments from a talking pigeon, all woven together with their own thoughts as they try to understand why addiction keeps repeating across generations and how their family might find a better future.

== Participants ==
- David Richter
- Pepa Lubojacki
- David Lubojacki
- Marco Arnone

== Production ==
The film shot on an iPhone is produced by Klara Mamojkova and Wanda Kapralova for Claw Films, in co-production with Guča Films, Czech Television and the Czech Republic’s Film and TV School of the Academy of Performing Arts in Prague.

In October 2023, the project was named the most promising European project at Ji.hlava International Documentary Film Festival in New Visions Forum 2023 and won post-production services in the value of €15,000 from Universal Production Partners, Prague and €5,000 from Soundsquare, Prague. In February 2024, the film was selected in CPH:WIP 2024 project. In April 2024, the production team participated in Prague-based East Doc Platform 2024, looking for partners, who can help finalise the financing, festivals, sales agents and international distributors.

== Release ==
If Pigeons Turned to Gold had its world premiere on 13 February 2026, as part of the 76th Berlin International Film Festival, in Forum. Subsequently it was screened at the International Istanbul Film Festival on 10 April 2026, and at the Neisse Film Festival on 27 May 2026. The film was screened on 8 June 2026 as part of the DocuDays UA International Human Rights Documentary Film Festival in Docu Best section and in the 73rd Sydney Film Festival International Documentaries on 10 June 2026 for its Australian Premiere. The film was also part of Special Screenings section of the 60th Karlovy Vary International Film Festival, where it was screened from 8 July to 10 July 2026.

It will also be showcased in 'The New Alchemists' section of the 2026 Festival du nouveau cinéma on 11 October.

Croatia-based company Split Screen acquired the international rights of the film in February 2026.

The film was selected for Czech submission for the 99th Academy Awards for Best International Feature Film.

The film will be released in Czech theatres on 24 September 2026.

== Reception ==
Reviewing the film at Berlin International Film Festival for Cineuropa, Vladan Petkovic described it as "a peculiar artwork" with a highly experimental cinematic approach. He noted its combination of raw observational footage with artificial intelligence imagery, including animated family photographs, which creates an "odd and unsettling feeling" while reflecting the film's exploration of addiction and family trauma. Petkovic found the film's central questions "soul-shattering" and considered its themes universal, observing that viewers are drawn into the family's suffering despite the occasionally alienating AI animation. Criticising the length of the film he opined that the contrast between smartphone footage, AI imagery, and social media-inspired visuals "probably won't be everyone's cup of tea" and felt the film's 110-minute runtime could have been shortened for a more focused narrative. Concluding that the film's greatest weakness was also its greatest strength, he argued that its "unevenness" made the pacing engaging but left the structure seeming "outside the director's control" despite its spontaneous and heartfelt approach.

== Accolades ==
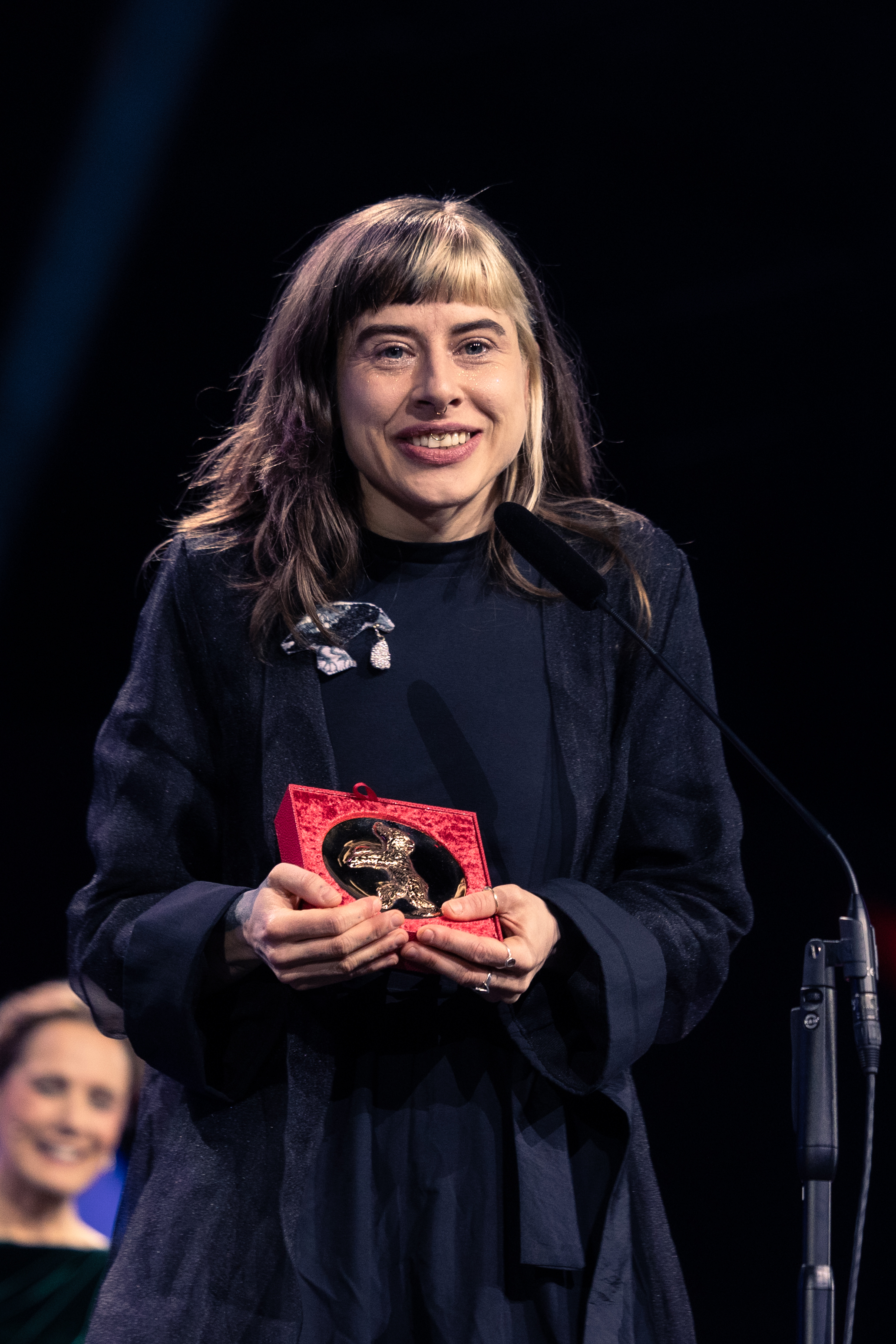
Pepa Lubojacki, winner of Berlinale Best Documentary Award

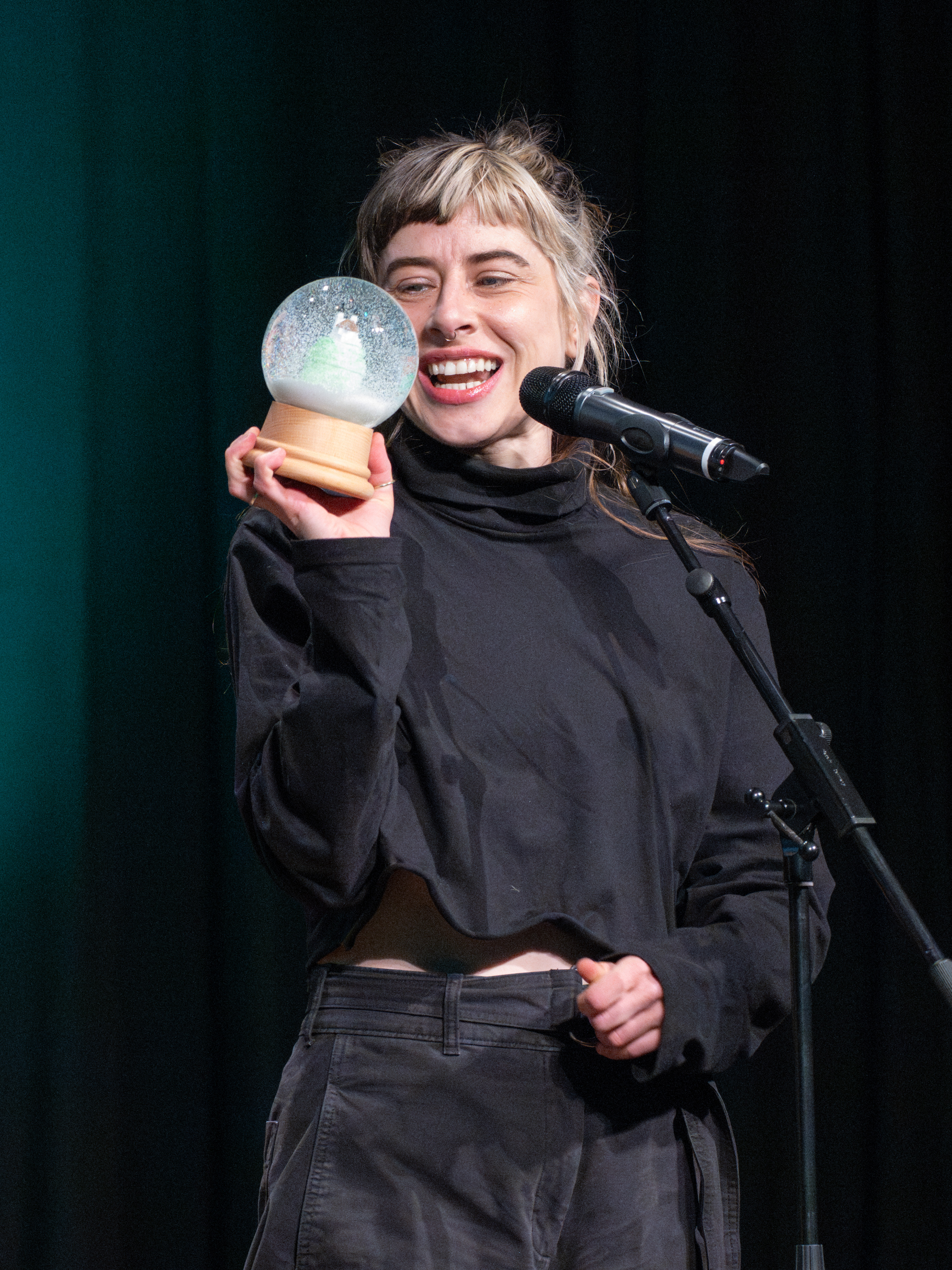
Pepa Lubojacki, winner of the "Social Awareness Award - Best Documentary Film" at the Crossing Europe Film Festival 2026 in Linz (Austria)

Award	Date of ceremony	Category	Recipient	Result	Ref.
Berlin International Film Festival	22 February 2026	Berlinale Documentary Film Award	If Pigeons Turned to Gold	Won	
Berlin International Film Festival	22 February 2026	Caligari Film Prize	If Pigeons Turned to Gold	Won	
Crossing Europe Award	2 May 2026	Crossing Europe Social Awareness Award for European Documentaries	Pepa Lubojacki	Won	
Kraków Film Festival	7 June 2026	Silver Horn for the director of the film on social issues	Pepa Lubojacki	Won	
Kraków Film Festival	7 June 2026	The Award of the Student Jury	If Pigeons Turned to Gold	Won	
DocuDays UA International Human Rights Documentary Film Festival	11 June 2026	Main Prize Rights Now!	If Pigeons Turned to Gold	Nominated	
DocuDays UA International Human Rights Documentary Film Festival	11 June 2026	Special Mention Rights Now!	If Pigeons Turned to Gold	Won	

== See also ==
- List of Czech submissions for the Academy Award for Best International Feature Film
- List of submissions to the 99th Academy Awards for Best International Feature Film
