= A Family (2026 Dutch-Belgian film) =

2026 Dutch drama film

- Promotional poster
- Directed by: Mees Peijnenburg
- Screenplay by: Mees Peijnenburg; Bastiaan Kroeger
- Produced by: Iris Otten; Nathalie van der Burg; Sander van Meurs
- Starring: Celeste Holsheimer; Finn Vogels; Carice van Houten; Pieter Embrechts
- Cinematography: Jasper Wolf
- Edited by: Imre Reutelingsperger
- Music by: Annelotte Coster
- Production companies: Juliet at Pupkin; The Reunion
- Distributed by: Cinéart
- Release date: 15 February 2026 (Berlinale)
- Running time: 89 minutes
- Countries: Netherlands; Belgium
- Language: Dutch

A Family is a 2026 drama film co-written and directed by Mees Peijnenburg. A Dutch and Belgian co-production, it stars Celeste Holsheimer, Finn Vogels, Carice van Houten and Pieter Embrechts and follows a custody battle between two divorcing parents from the perspective of their 14 and 16 year-old children.

The film had its world premiere at the Generation 14plus section of the 76th Berlin International Film Festival on 15 February 2026, where it competed for the Crystal Bear.

== Cast ==
- Celeste Holsheimer as Nina
- Finn Vogels as Eli
- Carice van Houten as Maria
- Pieter Embrechts as Jacob

== Production ==
The film written by Bastiaan Kroeger and Peijnenburg with Jasper Wolf handling cinematography stated Production in October 2024.

The film was shot in milky summer light and with skittish camera movements.

== Release ==
A Family had its world premiere on 15 February 2026, as part of the 76th Berlin International Film Festival, in Generation 14plus.

In July 2026, it was showcased at the Giffoni Film Festival in Films in Competition.

== Reception ==
Reviewing the film for ScreenDaily, Boyd van Hoeij praised Mees Peijnenburg's direction, highlighting the film's visual style, including its "milky summer light" cinematography and expressive handheld camerawork. He noted the director's keen attention to body language and subtle emotional details, although he felt the three-chapter structure was not entirely successful. He appreciated that the screenplay remains closely focused on the teenage siblings, with the adults functioning primarily as supporting characters. He praised the performances of both young leads, Vogels and Holsheimer, describing them as compelling, and found Vogels particularly impressive, noting that although his character speaks little, "his thoughts are clearly legible." While acknowledging the film's observational approach, Van Hoeij concluded that its modest running time and restrained storytelling prevent it from developing into "a full-blown character study." He felt that the film does not fully explore its characters, adding that the brief final chapter appears somewhat "unfocused and unmoored."

Namrata Joshi of The New Indian Express praised the film as an empathetic and emotionally resonant drama that explores the impact of parental divorce through the perspective of two children. Joshi described it as "a rare film" that foregrounds the children's viewpoint while avoiding blame or judgment. She commended Mees Peijnenburg's restrained direction, immersive storytelling, and the combination of writing, cinematography, and performances for making the characters' emotions deeply tangible. She also singled out the performances of Holsheimer and Vogels, noting how their expressive faces and intimate close-ups make the children's pain especially affecting. Albeit she called it "a quiet film drenched in sadness," Joshi concluded that it ultimately offers hope through the siblings' "unbreakable bond" and their capacity for healing, love, and renewal.

== Accolades ==
Award	Date of ceremony	Category	Recipient	Result	Ref.
Berlin International Film Festival	22 February 2026	Crystal Bear for the Best Film in Generation 14plus	A Family	Nominated	
Berlin International Film Festival	22 February 2026	Special Mention	A Family	Won	
Taipei Golden Horse Film Festival	18 November 2026	New Currents Youth Perspective Award	A Family	Won	
