= Not a Hero (film) =

2026 film by Rima Das

- International promotional poster
- Directed by: Rima Das
- Written by: Rima Das
- Produced by: Rima Das; Fran Borgia
- Starring: Bhuman Bhargav Das; Sukanya Boruah; Mrinmoy Das
- Cinematography: Rima Das; Aditya Varma
- Edited by: Rima Das
- Music by: Pallab Talukdar
- Production companies: Flying River Films; Akanga Film Asia
- Distributed by: Flying River Films
- Release date: 14 February 2026 (Berlinale)
- Running time: 97 minutes
- Countries: India; Singapore
- Languages: Assamese; Hindi; English

Not a Hero is a 2026 Indian-Singaporean coming-of-age drama film written, edited, produced and directed by Rima Das. Set between the city and the countryside, the film follows a young boy who moves from city life to his ancestral village. The film was made in Assamese, Hindi, and English. The film had its world premiere at the Generation Kplus section of the 76th Berlin International Film Festival on 14 February 2026, where it got a Special Mention in 'Crystal Bear for the Best Film in Generation Kplus', by Generation – Youth Jury.

== Synopsis ==
The film unfolds without dramatic events, focusing instead on the understated transformation of Mivan and the gentle reawakening of those around him.

Eleven-year-old Mivan, sent from the city to live with his young aunt Pahi in their ancestral village, struggles to adjust to rural life and their emotionally distant household. As he slowly involves into the community—attending school, making friends, and participating in daily routines, he develops a deeper awareness of the people and environment around him. His quiet presence gradually prompts subtle emotional shifts among the adults, revealing long-suppressed feelings.

== Cast ==
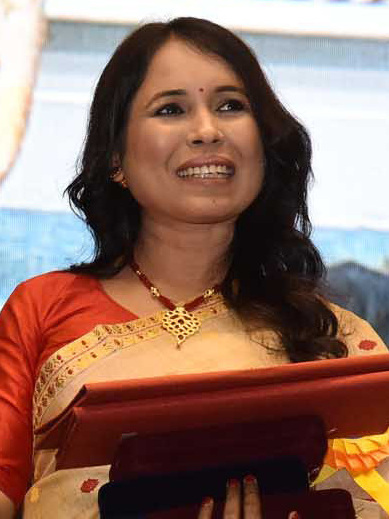
Rima Das at 65th National Film Awards Function (2018)

- Bhuman Bhargav Das as Mivan
- Sukanya Boruah as Pahi
- Mrinmoy Das as Rio

== Release ==
Not a Hero had its world premiere in the Generation Kplus section of the 76th Berlin International Film Festival on 14 February 2026.

The film was screened at the Zlín Film Festival, an annual festival of children's film in Zlín in the Czech Republic, on 31 May 2026 in the International Competition of Feature Films in the Children’s Category.

It was screened in ZFF for Kids section of the Zurich Film Festival on 26 September 2026.

It was screened in 'A Window on Asian Cinema' section of the 31st Busan International Film Festival on 8 October 2026.

Paris-based sales company MMM Film Sales acquired the international sales rights of the film.

== Accolades ==
Award	Date of ceremony	Category	Recipient(s)	Result	Ref.
Berlin International Film Festival	22 February 2026	Crystal Bear for the Best Film in Generation Kplus	Not a Hero	Special Mention	
Indian Film Festival of Melbourne	14 August 2026	Best Indie Film	Not a Hero	Won	
