= 76th Berlin International Film Festival =

2026 film festival edition

- Official festival poster
- Opening film: No Good Men
- Location: Berlin, Germany
- Founded: 1951
- Awards: Golden Bear: Yellow Letters
- Artistic director: Tricia Tuttle
- Festival date: 12–22 February 2026
- Website: www.berlinale.de

Berlin International Film Festival
- 77th 75th

The 76th annual Berlin International Film Festival, usually called the Berlinale, took place from 12 to 22 February 2026 in Berlin, Germany. German filmmaker Wim Wenders was named the Jury President for the main competition.

Yellow Letters by İlker Çatak won the festival's top prize, the Golden Bear. The Silver Bear Grand Jury Prize was awarded to Salvation by Emin Alper. While the Silver Bear for Best Leading Performance was awarded to Sandra Hüller for Rose.

The festival opened with German-Afghan drama film No Good Men by Shahrbanoo Sadat. During the opening ceremony, Malaysian actress Michelle Yeoh was awarded the Honorary Golden Bear.

== Controversies ==
The festival was marked for a number of controversies regarding the ongoing Gaza war and Germany's government role in it.

During the press conference for the main competition jury, Wenders, in response to a question about the festival's government-based funding and its official response to the ongoing Gaza genocide in comparison to its full support to Ukraine and Iranian democratic protests, stated that the jury "has to stay out of politics".

The statement created controversy throughout the festival, resulting in the withdrawal of the films The Dislocation of Amber (1975) by Sudanese filmmaker Hussein Shariffe and Sad Song of Touha (1972) by Egyptian filmmaker Atteyat El Abnoudy, as well as the writer Arundhati Roy, who was scheduled to appear with a restoration of the Indian film In Which Annie Gives It Those Ones (1989). Roy said that "To hear them say that art should not be political is jaw-dropping. It is a way of shutting down a conversation about a crime against humanity even as it unfolds before us in real time—when artists, writers and film-makers should be doing everything in their power to stop it".

On 17 February, more than 80 directors, actors and producers including Tilda Swinton, Javier Bardem, Adam McKay and Mike Leigh signed an open letter criticising the festival for “censoring artists who oppose Israel’s ongoing genocide against Palestinians in Gaza and the German state’s key role in enabling it”, the letter urges the Festival to condemn the ongoing massacre of civilians in a similar position adopted to the ongoing massacre of civilians in Ukraine and Iran.

Responding to the open letter, Berlinale's artistic director Tricia Tuttle stated that the festival would not change its position on Israel, but added that "people are realizing that maybe staatsräson is holding us back from having important conversations about the government that is currently in power in Israel".

During the closing ceremony, numerous winners and jury members from sidebars sections, who were mostly filmmakers from the Middle East, including Emin Alper, Abdallah Al-Khatib, Marie-Rose Osta and Ameer Fakher Eldin, took the stage to criticize the festival's lack of support to Palestinian civilians and condemn the ongoing genocide in Gaza.

Palestinian-Syrian filmmaker Abdallah Al-Khatib won the GWFF Best First Feature Award for Chronicles from the Siege. This film was the only Palestinian feature selected to the festival. The filmmaker, who lives in Germany, criticized the German and Israeli governments and their involvements in the Gaza War during his speech, prompting Germany's Federal Minister for the Environment Carsten Schneider (SPD) to leave the ceremony.

In the aftermath of the closing ceremony, controversy ensued around Germany's Minister of State for Culture led by Wolfram Weimer (CDU), the festival's main funder. An extraordinary meeting over the future of the festival was called by the Minister cabinet, while artist director Tricia Tuttle faced imminent risk of dismissal after posing for pictures alongside a flag of Palestine held by Chronicles from the Siege crew. Tuttle had been hired after the 74th edition, on a 5-year deal, following the dismissal of Carlo Chatrian and Mariette Rissenbeek for similar reasons. Shortly after, new open letters were created, this time supporting Tuttle and expressing concern with the German government censorship attempts, and were signed by industry members, Israeli filmmakers, international festival directors, and the Berlinale staff. Following these events, Weimer announced that the German government would not dismiss Tuttle, and instead planned to develop guidelines for publicly funded cultural institutions aimed at balancing artistic freedom with Germany’s responsibilities regarding antisemitism and support for Israel.

Yeoh's refusal to comment on the U.S. government's ongoing mass deportation program was also met with further controversy.

The refusal of the German Embassy in Cairo to grant entry visas to a delegation of Sudanese filmmakers caused a stir. Sudanese filmmaker Mohammed Alomda, his producer Amjad Abu Alala and writer Paula Thabet were invited to attend the European Film Market, but pulled out after visa rejection over "migration risk". They had intended to present their film project Blue Card at the event.

== Juries ==
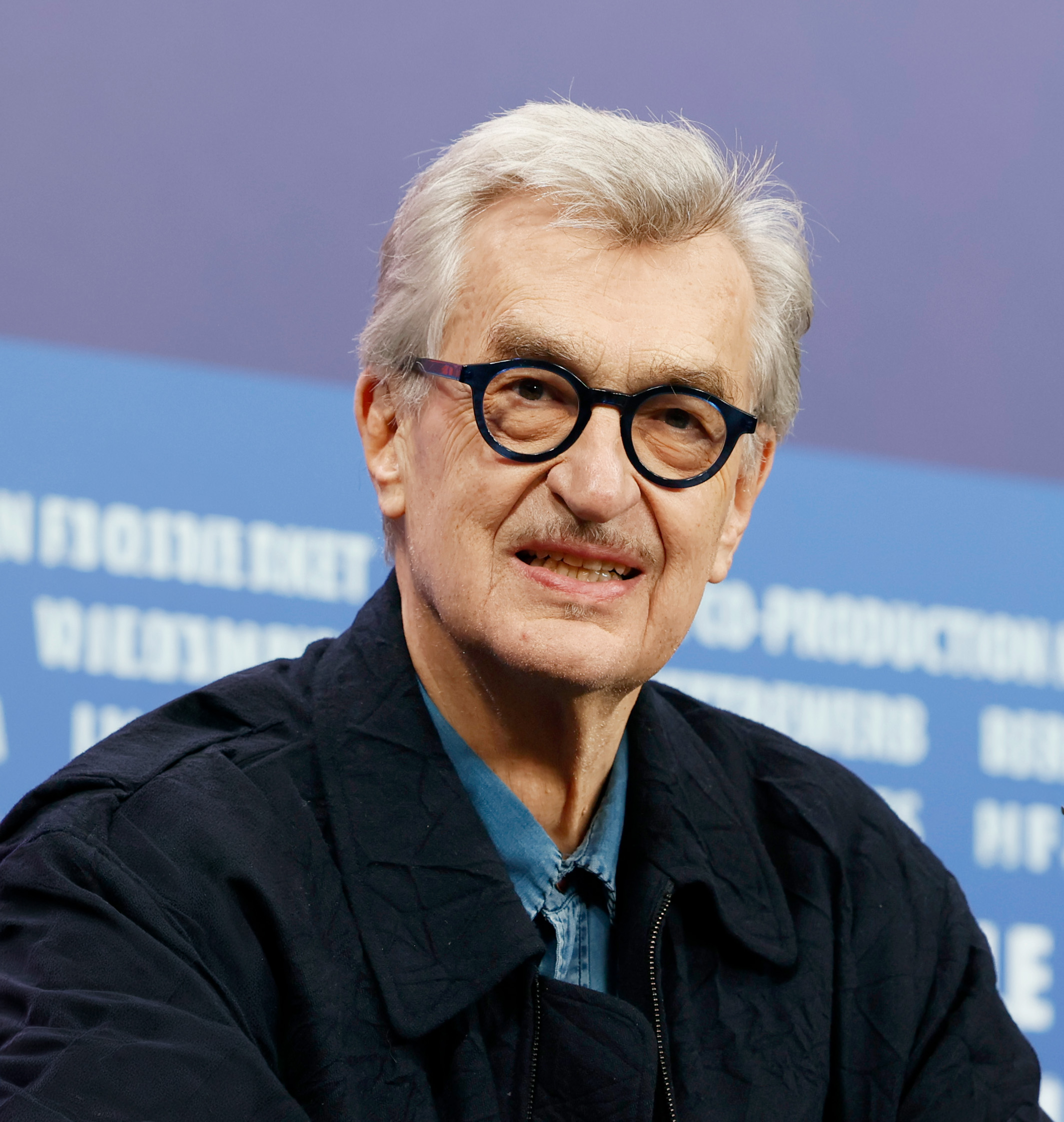
Main competition jury president Wim Wenders

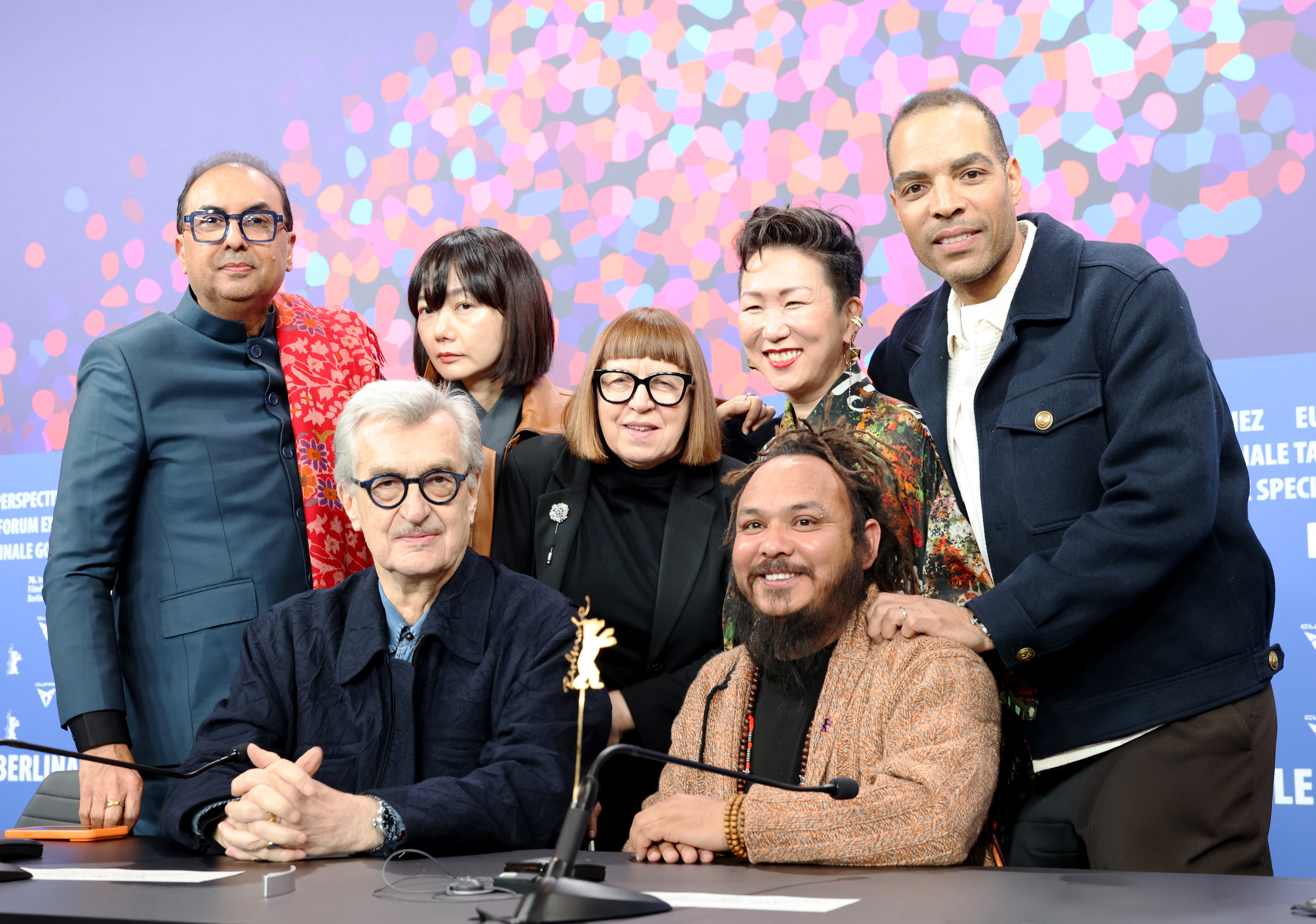
Main competition jury members

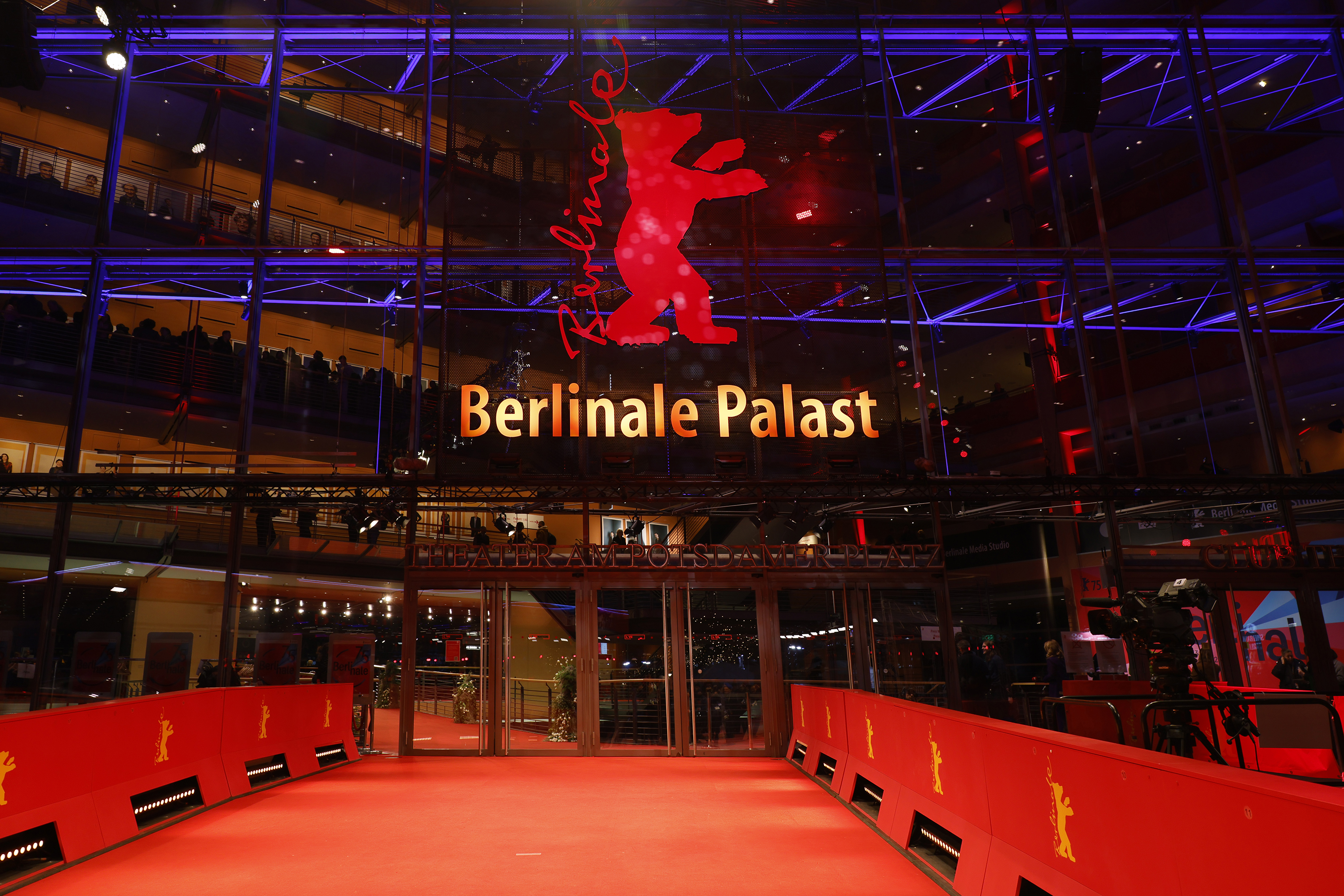
Berlinale Palast red carpet

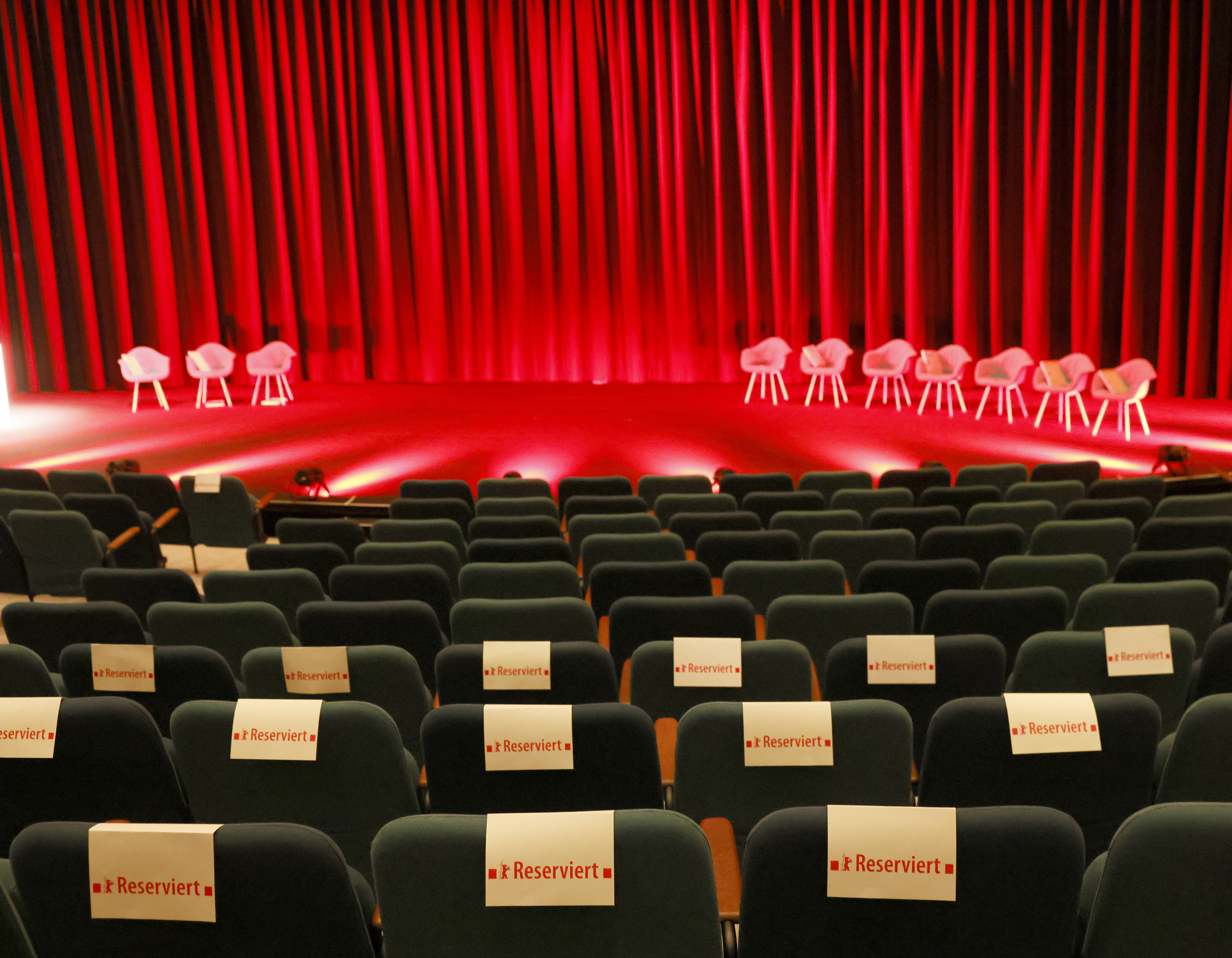
Berlinale theater

=== Main Competition ===
- Wim Wenders, German filmmaker – Jury President
- Min Bahadur Bham, Nepalese filmmaker
- Bae Doona, South Korean actress
- Shivendra Singh Dungarpur, Indian filmmaker
- Reinaldo Marcus Green, American filmmaker
- Hikari, Japanese filmmaker
- Ewa Puszczyńska, Polish producer

=== Perspectives Jury (GWFF Best First Feature Award) ===
- Sofia Alaoui, French-Moroccan filmmaker
- Frédéric Hambalek, German filmmaker
- Dorota Lech, Polish director of the New Horizons International Film Festival and programmer at TIFF

=== Short Film Competition ===
- Ameer Fakher Eldin, Syrian filmmaker
- Stefan Großmann, Austrian journalist and author
- Gabriele Stötzer, German visual artist

=== Generation Jury ===
- Khozy Rizal, Indonesian filmmaker
- Lena Urzendowsky, German actress
- Kim Yutani, American director of programming at the Sundance Film Festival

=== Berlinale Documentary Award Jury ===
- Lemohang Jeremiah Mosese, Lesotho filmmaker
- B. Ruby Rich, American scholar and film critic
- Shaunak Sen, Indian filmmaker

=== Teddy Award ===
- Saagar Gupta, Indian curator, producer, screenwriter, and the co-founder and Artistic Director of the KASHISH Pride Film Festival
- Skadi Loist, German Professor of Film Studies at the Norwegian University of Science and Technology
- Daniela Vega, Chilean actress, producer and singer
- Sigal Yehuda, Israeli-Belgian producer
- Ray Yeung, Hong Kong filmmaker

== Official Sections ==
=== Main Competition ===
The following films were selected for the main competition for the Golden Bear on 20 January 2026:

English Title	Original Title	Director(s)	Production Country
At the Sea		Kornél Mundruczó	United States, Hungary
Dao		Alain Gomis	France, Guinea-Bissau, Senegal
Dust		Anke Blondé	Belgium, Greece, Poland, United Kingdom
Everybody Digs Bill Evans		Grant Gee	Ireland, United Kingdom
Home Stories	Etwas ganz Besonderes	Eva Trobisch	Germany
In a Whisper	À voix basse	Leyla Bouzid	France, Tunisia
Josephine		Beth de Araújo	United States
The Loneliest Man in Town	Wiener Blues – The Loneliest Man in Town	Tizza Covi and Rainer Frimmel	Austria
Flies	Moscas	Fernando Eimbcke	Mexico
My Wife Cries	Meine Frau weint	Angela Schanelec	Germany, France
A New Dawn	花緑青が明ける日に	Yoshitoshi Shinomiya	France, Japan
Nightborn	Yön Lapsi	Hanna Bergholm	Finland, France, Lithuania, United Kingdom
Nina Roza		Geneviève Dulude-De Celles	Belgium, Bulgaria, Canada, Italy
Queen at Sea		Lance Hammer	United Kingdom, United States
Rose		Markus Schleinzer	Austria, Germany
Rosebush Pruning		Karim Aïnouz	Germany, Italy, Spain, United Kingdom
Soumsoum, the Night of the Stars	Soumsoum, la nuit des astres	Mahamat-Saleh Haroun	Chad, France
Salvation	Kurtuluş	Emin Alper	France, Greece, Netherlands, Saudi Arabia, Sweden, Turkey
Yellow Letters	Gelbe Briefe	İlker Çatak	Germany, France, Turkey
We Are All Strangers	我们不是陌生人	Anthony Chen	Singapore
Wolfram		Warwick Thornton	Australia
Yo (Love Is a Rebellious Bird)		Anna Fitch and Banker White	United States

=== Berlinale Special — Out of Competition ===
The following films are selected for the Berlinale Special screening:

English Title	Original Title	Director(s)	Production Country
Special Gala
The Blood Countess	Die Blutgräfin	Ulrike Ottinger	Austria, Luxembourg, Germany
Good Luck, Have Fun, Don't Die		Gore Verbinski	United States, Germany, South Africa
Heysel 85		Teodora Ana Mihai	Belgium, Romania, Netherlands, Germany
No Good Men (opening film)	Kabul Jan	Shahrbanoo Sadat	Germany, France, Norway, Denmark, Afghanistan
The Only Living Pickpocket in New York		Noah Segan	United States
The Testament of Ann Lee		Mona Fastvold	United Kingdom, United States
The Weight		Padraic McKinley	United States
Honorary Golden Bear
Everything Everywhere All at Once (2022)		Daniel Kwan and Daniel Scheinert	United States
Sandiwara (short)		Sean Baker	United States, Malaysia
Special Midnight
The Ballad of Judas Priest		Sam Dunn and Tom Morello	United States
Saccharine		Natalie Erika James	Australia
Sleep No More	Monster Pabrik Rambut	Edwin	Indonesia, Singapore, Japan, Germany, France
Special Presentations
A Child of My Own	Un hijo propio	Maite Alberdi	Mexico
Tutu		Sam Pollard	United Kingdom
Wax & Gold		Ruth Beckermann	Austria
Who Killed Alex Odeh?		Jason Osder and William Lafi Youmans	United States
Special Series
The House of the Spirits	La casa de los espíritus	Francisca Alegría and Andrés Wood	Chile
House of Yang		Mia Spengler	Germany
Lord of the Flies		Marc Munden	United Kingdom
Mint		Charlotte Regan	United Kingdom
Ravalear: Not For Sale	Ravalear	Pol Rodríguez and Isaki Lacuesta	Spain
The Story of Documentary Film		Mark Cousins	United Kingdom

=== Perspectives ===
14 films will be competing for the Best First Feature Award. The following films were selected for the second edition of the Perspectives section:

English title	Original title	Director(s)	Production country
17		Kosara Mitić	North Macedonia, Serbia, Slovenia
Animol		Ashley Walters	United Kingdom
A Prayer for the Dying		Dara Van Dusen	Norway, Greece, United Kingdom, Sweden
Chronicles from the Siege	وقائع زمن الحصار	Abdallah Al-Khatib	Algeria, France, Palestine
Filipiñana		Rafael Manuel	Singapore, United Kingdom, Philippines, France, Netherlands
Forest High	Forêt Ivre	Manon Coubia	Belgium, France
Light Pillar	寒夜灯柱	Zao Xu	China
Our Secret	Nosso Segredo	Grace Passô	Brazil, Portugal
The Red Hangar	Hangar rojo	Juan Pablo Sallato	Chile, Argentina, Italy
The River Train	El Tren Fluvial	Lorenzo Ferro and Lucas A. Vignale	Argentina
Take Me Home		Liz Sargent	United States
Trial of Hein	Der Heimatlose	Kai Stänicke	Germany
Truly Naked		Muriel d'Ansembourg	Netherlands, Belgium, France
Where To?	לאן	Assaf Machnes	Israel, Germany

=== Short Film Competition ===
The following films were selected for the Short Films Competition and nominated for the Short Film Golden Bear:

English Title	Original Title	Director(s)	Production Country
An Accident	Ein Unfall	Angelika Spangel	Austria
A Woman's Place is Everywhere		Fanny Texier	United States
Chuuraa		Evgenia Arbugaeva	United Kingdom
Cosmonauts		Leo Černic	Slovenia, Italy
Flim Flam		Siegfried A. Fruhauf	Austria
Graft Versus Host		Giorgi Gago Gagoshidze	Germany, Georgia
Henry is a Girl Who Likes to Sleep		Marthe Peters	Belgium
Incident on the Mountain	Oupatevak het tam phnom	Savunthara Seng	Cambodia
Les juifs riches		Yolande Zauberman	France
Kleptomania	地三鲜	Jingkai Qu	China
Kontrewers		Zuza Banasińska	Netherlands, Poland, France
Miriam		Karla Condado	Mexico
Shot Reverse Shot	Plan contraplan	Radu Jude and Adrian Cioflâncă	Romania
Someday a Child	Yawman ma walad	Marie-Rose Osta	France, Romania, Lebanon
Souls of Fouta	Les âmes du Fouta	Alpha Diallo	France, Senegal
Stallion and a Crystal Ball	Stallion y la bola de cristal	Christian Avilés	Spain
Taxi Moto		Gaël Kamilindi	Switzerland, France
Time to Go	La hora de irse	Renzo Cozza	Argentina
Unidentified Nonflying Objects (UNO)	Unidentifizierte Unflugobjekte (UUO)	Sasha Svirsky	Germany
With a Kind Regard	Mit einem freundlichen Gruss	Pavel Mozhar	Germany
Yuragim		Varia Garib and Kirill Komar	Austria, Uzbekistan

=== Panorama ===
The following films were selected for the Panorama section:

English Title	Original Title	Director(s)	Production Country
Allegro Pastell		Anna Roller	Germany
Árru		Elle Sofe Sara	Norway, Sweden, Finland
The Day She Returns	그녀가 돌아온 날	Hong Sang-soo	South Korea
The Education of Jane Cumming		Sophie Heldman	Germany, Switzerland, United Kingdom
Enjoy Your Stay		Dominik Locher and Honeylyn Joy Alipio	Switzerland, France, Philippines
Four Minus Three	Vier minus drei	Adrian Goiginger	Austria, Germany
The Garden We Dreamed	El jardín que soñamos	Joaquín del Paso	Mexico
If I Were Alive	Se Eu Fosse Vivo... Vivia	André Novais Oliveira	Brazil
Isabel		Gabe Klinger	Brazil, France
I Understand Your Displeasure	Ich verstehe Ihren Unmut	Kilian Armando Friedrich	Germany
Iván & Hadoum		Ian de la Rosa	Spain, Germany, Belgium
Lady		Olive Nwosu	United Kingdom
Lali		Sarmad Khoosat	Pakistan
London		Sebastian Brameshuber	Austria
The Moment		Aidan Zamiri	United States
Mouse		Kelly O'Sullivan and Alex Thompson	United States
Narciso		Marcelo Martinessi	Paraguay, Germany, Uruguay, Brazil, Portugal, Spain, France
Numb	しびれ	Takuya Uchiyama	Japan
Only Rebels Win	Seuls les rebelles	Danielle Arbid	France, Lebanon, Qatar
Paradise		Jérémy Comte	Canada, France, Ghana
Prosecution	Staatsschutz	Faraz Shariat	Germany
Raging	Rumaragasa	Ryan Machado	Philippines
Roya		Mahnaz Mohammadi	Iran, Germany, Luxembourg, Czechia
Safe Exit	خروج آمن	Mohammed Hammad	Egypt, Libya, Tunisia, Qatar, Germany
Shanghai Daughter	上海女儿	Agnis Shen Zhongmin	China
Panorama Dokumente
Around Paradise	Im Umkreis des Paradieses	Yulia Lokshina	Germany
A Russian Winter	Un hiver russe	Patric Chiha	France
Bucks Harbor		Pete Muller	United States
Douglas Gordon by Douglas Gordon		Finlay Pretsell	United Kingdom, France
Enough is Enough	Trop c'est trop	Elisé Sawasawa	France, Democratic Republic of the Congo
The Hidden Face of the Earth	La Face cachée de la Terre	Arnaud Alain	France
Jaripeo		Efraín Mojica and Rebecca Zweig	Mexico, United States, France
The Other Side of the Sun	الجانب الآخر من الشمس	Tawfik Sabouni	Belgium, France, Saudi Arabia
Siri Hustvedt – Dance Around the Self		Sabine Lidl	Germany, Switzerland
Traces	Сліди	Alisa Kovalenko and Marysia Nikitiuk	Ukraine, Poland
Tristan Forever		Tobias Nölle and Loran Bonnardot	Switzerland
Two Mountains Weighing Down My Chest	东山飘雨西山晴	Viv Li	Germany, Netherlands

=== Forum ===
The following films were selected for the Forum section:

English Title	Original Title	Director(s)	Production Country
AnyMart	チルド	Yusuke Iwasaki	Japan
Black Lions – Roman Wolves		Haile Gerima	Ethiopia, United States
Cesarean Weekend		Mohammad Shirvani	Iran
Chronos – Flow of Time	Chronos – Fluss der Zeit	Volker Koepp	Germany
Collapse	Effondrement	Anat Even	France
Crocodile		The Critics and Pietra Brettkelly	New Zealand, Nigeria
The Day of Wrath: Tales from Tripoli		Rania Rafei	Lebanon, Saudi Arabia, Qatar
Doggerland		Kim Ekberg	Sweden
Eight Bridges		James Benning	United States
Einar Schleef – No Germany Did I Find	Einar Schleef – Ich habe kein Deutschland gefunden	Sandra Prechtel	Germany
Everything Else Is Noise	Lo demás es ruido	Nicolás Pereda	Mexico, Germany, Canada
Flying Tigers		Madhusree Dutta	Germany, India
Foreign Travel	Auslandsreise	Ted Fendt	Germany
Forest up in the Mountain		Sofia Bordenave	Argentina
Gemstones	Piedras preciosas	Simón Vélez	Colombia, Portugal
Ghost in the Cell		Joko Anwar	Indonesia
Given Names	Prénoms	Nurith Aviv	France
Hear the Yellow		Banu Sıvacı	Turkey
I Built a Rocket Imagining Your Arrival	Eu Construi um Foguete Imaginando sua Chegada	Janaína Marques	Brazil
If Pigeons Turned to Gold		Pepa Lubojacki	Czechia, Slovakia
Joy Boy: A Tribute to Julius Eastman		Mawena Yehouessi, Fallon Mayanja, Rob Jacobs, Victoire Karera Kampire, Paul Shemisi and Anne Reijniers	Belgium
Lust		Ralitza Petrova	Bulgaria, Denmark, Sweden
Masayume	まさゆめ	Nao Yoshigai	Japan
Members of the Problematic Family		R Gowtham	India
The Moths & the Flame		Kevin Contento	United States
My Name	내 이름은	Chung Ji-young	South Korea
On Our Own	De capul nostru	Tudor Cristian Jurgiu	Romania, Italy
Panda	伤寒杂病论	Xinyang Zhang	Singapore, Hong Kong, China
Scenario	Szenario	Marie Wilke	Germany
Sometimes, I Imagine Them All at a Party	Was an Empfindsamkeit bleibt	Daniela Magnani Hüller	Germany
We Are the Fruits of the Forest	Nous sommes les fruits de la forêt	Rithy Panh	Cambodia, France
Women as Lovers	Liebhaberinnen	Koxi	Germany, Luxembourg
Forum Special
A Lot Talk	Beaucoup parler	Pascale Bodet	France
Barbara Forever		Brydie O'Connor	United States
Frauen in Berlin (1981)		Chetna Vora	East Germany
My Brother's Wedding (1983)		Charles Burnett	United States
On the Field of God in 1972–73 / A Hungarian Village (1974)	Istenmezején 1972-73-ban	Judit Elek	Hungary
River Dreams		Kristina Mikhailova	Kazakhstan, Switzerland, United Kingdom
When You Listen to This Song	Quand tu ecouteras cette chanson	Mona Achache	France
Forum Special – Short Films
AI Realism – Qantar 2022		Almagul Menlibayeva	Kazakhstan
Encounter (1963)	Találkozás	Judit Elek	Hungary
Love Your Nails!		Narges Kalhor	Germany
MegatrashwannabebigstarXD		Ava Leandra Kleber and Elisa Deutloff	Germany
The Most Beautiful Man in the World	L'uomo più bello del mondo	Paolo Baiguera	Italy
The Valley Where Loab Lives		Georg Tiller	Austria

=== Forum Expanded ===
The following short films and exhibitions works were selected for the Forum Expanded section:

English Title	Original Title	Director(s)	Production Country
A Circle as the Center of the Whole		Utkarsh	United States, india
Born of the Yam		Mark Chua and Lam Li Shuen	Singapore
~~The Dislocation of Amber (1975)~~	~~انتزاع الكهرمان~~	~~Hussein Shariffe~~	~~Sudan~~
El León		Diana Bustamante	Colombia
Exprmntl 4 Knokke (1967)		Claudia von Alemann and Reinold E. Thiel	West Germany
Filme Pin		María Rojas Arias and Andrés Jurado	Colombia, Portugal
Film No. 4 (Bottoms) (1966)		Yoko Ono and Anthony Cox	United States
Forest of the End of the World	Floresta do fim do mundo	Felipe M. Bragança and Denilson Baniwa	Brazil
Forever...Forever		Johann Lurf	Austria, France
Fruits of Despair		Nima Nassaj	Iran
In Sum	Phi Pattana	Komtouch Napattaloong	Thailand
Katabasis		Martin Moolhuijsen	Germany, Italy
Let There Be Whistleblowers (2005)		Ken Jacobs and Flo Jacobs	United States
Metanoia		Bigum + Björge	Germany, Finland
Muscle		Karimah Ashadu	Italy, United Kingdom, United States, Germany, Nigeria
Narrative		Anocha Suwichakornpong	Thailand, South Korea, Japan
Nursery Rhymes. (Holy) Water		Belinda Kazeem-Kamiński	Austria, Italy
Pink Schlemmer		Oliver Husain	Canada
The Recce		Daniel Mann	United Kingdom, Germany
~~Sad Song of Touha (1972)~~	~~Oghneyet Touha Al Hazina~~	~~Atteyat Al Abnoudy~~	~~Egypt~~
This Desirable Device		Mina Simendić	Serbia, Germany
This Suffocating Now		Vika Kirchenbauer	Germany
Uchronia		Fil Ieropoulos	Greece, Netherlands
Warnings to the Distant Future	Warnungen an die ferne Zukunft	Juliane Jaschnow and Stefanie Schroeder	Germany
The Weary Hours of Two Lab Assistants	İki Laborantın Yorgun Saatleri	Burak Çevik	Turkey, Germany, United Kingdom, Croatia
Yurugu – Invisible Lines		Petna Ndaliko Katondolo and Laurent Van Lancker	Democratic Republic of the Congo, Belgium, United States
Forum Expanded Exhibitions
Butterfly Stories: Malaise II		Laurence Favre	Switzerland, Germany
Casting for a Film, Ihsan’s Diary		Lamia Joreige	Lebanon
Fanfictie: Volcanology		Riar Rizaldi	Indonesia, Italy
Industries of Denial, Stage 10: From Musa Dagh to Port Saïd		Angela Melitopoulos and Kerstin Schroedinger	Germany, Greece, Finland
Land Invaders		Cassandra Gardiner and Juan Mateo Menendez	United States
The sun that fell into the water		Lena Kocutar	Germany, Slovenia
We Deh Here		Maybelle Peters	United Kingdom

=== Generation ===
The following films were selected for the Generation sections:

English Title	Original Title	Director(s)	Production Country
Generation Kplus
The Atlas of the Universe	Atlasul universului	Paul Negoescu	Romania, Bulgaria
Chimney Town: Frozen in Time	映画 えんとつ町のプペル 〜約束の時計台〜	Yusuke Hirota	Japan
Eeny, Meeny, Miny, Moe!	En, ten, týky!	Andrea Szelesová	Czechia
Everyone's Sorry Nowadays	Tegenwoordig heet iedereen Sorry	Frederike Migom	Belgium, Netherlands, Germany
The Fabulous Time Machine	A Fabulosa Máquina do Tempo	Eliza Capai	Brazil
Ghost School		Seemab Gul	Pakistan, Germany, Saudi Arabia
Gugu's World	Feito Pipa	Allan Deberton	Brazil
Not a Hero	Kein Held	Rima Das	India, Singapore
Papaya		Priscilla Kellen	Brazil
Generation Kplus – Short Films
Abracadabra		Amay Mehrishi	United Kingdom, India
Bats & Bugs	Nachtschwärmer	Lena von Döhren	Switzerland
Fire in My Pocket	Lángbogár a zsebemben	Janka Feiner	Hungary
Gravity	Yercekimi	Dalya Keleş	Turkey
Imaginary Numbers	Imaginarni brojevi	Jelica Jerinić	Serbia, Croatia
Riding Time		Roopa Gogineni and Farhaan Mumtaz	United Kingdom, France
A Serious Thought	ÖÖmõtted	Jonas Taul	Estonia
Speedy!	쓰삐디!	Oh Jiin	South Korea
Tutti	你吹Do我吹Si	Zhuang Rong Zuo	Taiwan
Under The Wave off Little Dragon		Jian Luo	United Kingdom
Whale 52 – Suite for Man, Boy, and Whale		Daniel Neiden	United States
White	Spî	Navroz Shaban	Iraq
Generation 14plus
A Family		Mees Peijnenburg	Netherlands, Belgium
Black Burns Fast		Sanduela Asanda	South Africa
Don't Come Out	No Salgas	Victoria Linares Villegas	Dominican Republic
Four Girls	Quatro Meninas	Karen Suzane	Brazil, Netherlands
Hotel Oblique		Merlin Flügel	Germany
The Lights, They Fall		Saša Vajda	Germany
Matapanki		Diego Mapache Fuentes	Chile
Sad Girlz	Chicas tristes	Fernanda Tovar	Mexico, Spain, France
Sunny Dancer		George Jaques	United Kingdom
What Will I Become?		Lexie Bean and Logan Rozos	United States
Generation 14plus – Short Films
The Dream of Dancing	Jülapüin Yonna	Luzbeidy Monterrosa Atencio	Colombia
En Route To	지우러 가는 길	Yoo Jae-in	South Korea
The Girl	妮儿	Yucheng Tan	China
Mambo Kids		Emanuele Tresca	Italy
Memories of a Window		Mehraneh Salimian and Amin Pakparvar	United States
Nobody Knows the World	Allá en el cielo	Roddy Dextre	Peru
Scorching	诞辰日	Wang Beidi	China
That’s My Sister	C’est ma soeur	Zoé Pelchat	Canada
The Thread		Fenn O'Meally	United Kingdom
When I Get Home	Cuando llegue a casa	Edgar Adrián	Mexico

=== Berlinale Classics ===
Featuring restored prints of classic productions or underseen gems, the following films were selected for the Berlinale Classics section:

English Title	Original Title	Director(s)	Production Country
Carnival in Flanders (1935)	La kermesse héroïque	Jacques Feyder	France, Germany
Crystal Palace (1934)	Кришталевий палац	Hryhori Hrycher	Soviet Union
Dead Mountaineer's Hotel (1979)	Hukkunud Alpinisti	Grigori Kromanov	Soviet Union
In Which Annie Gives It Those Ones (1989)		Pradip Krishen	India
Leaving Las Vegas (1995)		Mike Figgis	United States, France, United Kingdom
The Mirage (1979)	السراب	Ahmed Bouanani	Morocco
Ninja Scroll (1993)	獣兵衛忍風帖	Yoshiaki Kawajiri	Japan
The Pornographers (1966)	エロ事師たち”より 人類学入門	Shōhei Imamura	Japan
Prefab Story (1979)	Panelstory, aneb jak se rodí sídliště	Věra Chytilová	Czechoslovakia
Secrets of a Soul (1926)	Geheimnisse einer Seele	Georg Wilhelm Pabst	Germany

=== Retrospective — Lost in the 90s ===
The 2026's Berlinale Retrospective section celebrates a special decade: the 1990s. The following films were selected:

English Title	Original Title	Director(s)	Production Country
Bamboozled (2000)		Spike Lee	United States
Bells from the Deep (1993)	Glocken aus der Tiefe. Glaube und Aberglaube in Rußland	Werner Herzog	Germany, United States
Berlin, Bahnhof Friedrichstraße 1990 (1991)		Konstanze Binder, Lilly Grote, Ulrike Herdin and Julia Kunert	Germany
The Border Guard (1995)	Der Kontrolleur	Stefan Trampe	Germany
Boyz n the Hood (1991)		John Singleton	United States
The Double Life of Veronique (1991)	Podwójne życie Weroniki	Krzysztof Kieślowski	France, Poland, Norway
From the East (1993)	D'Est	Chantal Akerman	Belgium, France, Portugal
Germany Year 90 Nine Zero (1991)	Allemagne année 90 neuf zéro	Jean-Luc Godard	France
Gorilla Bathes at Noon (1993)	Gorila se kupa u podne	Dušan Makavejev	Yugoslavia, Germany
In the Splendour of Happiness (1990)	Im Glanze dieses Glückes	Johann Feindt, Jeanine Meerapfel, Helga Reidemeister, Dieter Schumann and Tamara Trampe	Germany
Joan of Arc of Mongolia (1989)	Johanna D'Arc of Mongolia	Ulrike Ottinger	West Germany
Juice (1992)		Ernest Dickerson	United States
Lola and Billy the Kid (1999)	Lola und Bilidikid	Kutluğ Ataman	Germany, Turkey
Orange Vests (1993)	Оранжевые жилеты	Yury Khashevatsky	Belarus, Germany
Run Lola Run (1998)	Lola rennt	Tom Tykwer	Germany

=== Teddy 40 ===
A special section as part of the 40 years celebration of the Teddy Award, featuring critically acclaimed queer productions. The following films were selected:

English Title	Original Title	Director(s)	Production Country
A Fantastic Woman (2017)	Una mujer fantástica	Sebastián Lelio	Chile, United States, Germany, Spain
A Thousand Clouds of Peace (2003)	Mil nubes de paz cercan el cielo, amor, jamás acabarás de ser amor	Julián Hernández	Mexico
The Blossoming of Maximo Oliveros (2005)	Ang Pagdadalaga ni Maximo Oliveros	Auraeus Solito	Philippines
Kokomo City (2023)		D. Smith	United States
Queens Don't Cry (2002)	Tunten lügen nicht	Rosa von Praunheim	Germany
Seduction: The Cruel Woman (1985)	Verführung: Die grausame Frau	Elfi Mikesch and Monika Treut	West Germany
Tomboy (2011)		Céline Sciamma	France
The Watermelon Woman (1996)		Cheryl Dunye	United States
Short Films
575 Castro St. (2008)		Jenni Olson	United States
Entropia (2018)		Flóra Anna Buda	Hungary
Love, Jealousy and Revenge (1991)	Liebe, Eifersucht und Rache	Michael Brynntrup	Germany
Mondial 2010 (2014)		Roy Dib	Lebanon
Playback (2019)	Playback. Ensayo de una despedida	Agustina Comedi	Argentina
To Write From Memory (2023)	默	Emory Chao Johnson	United States

== Official Awards ==
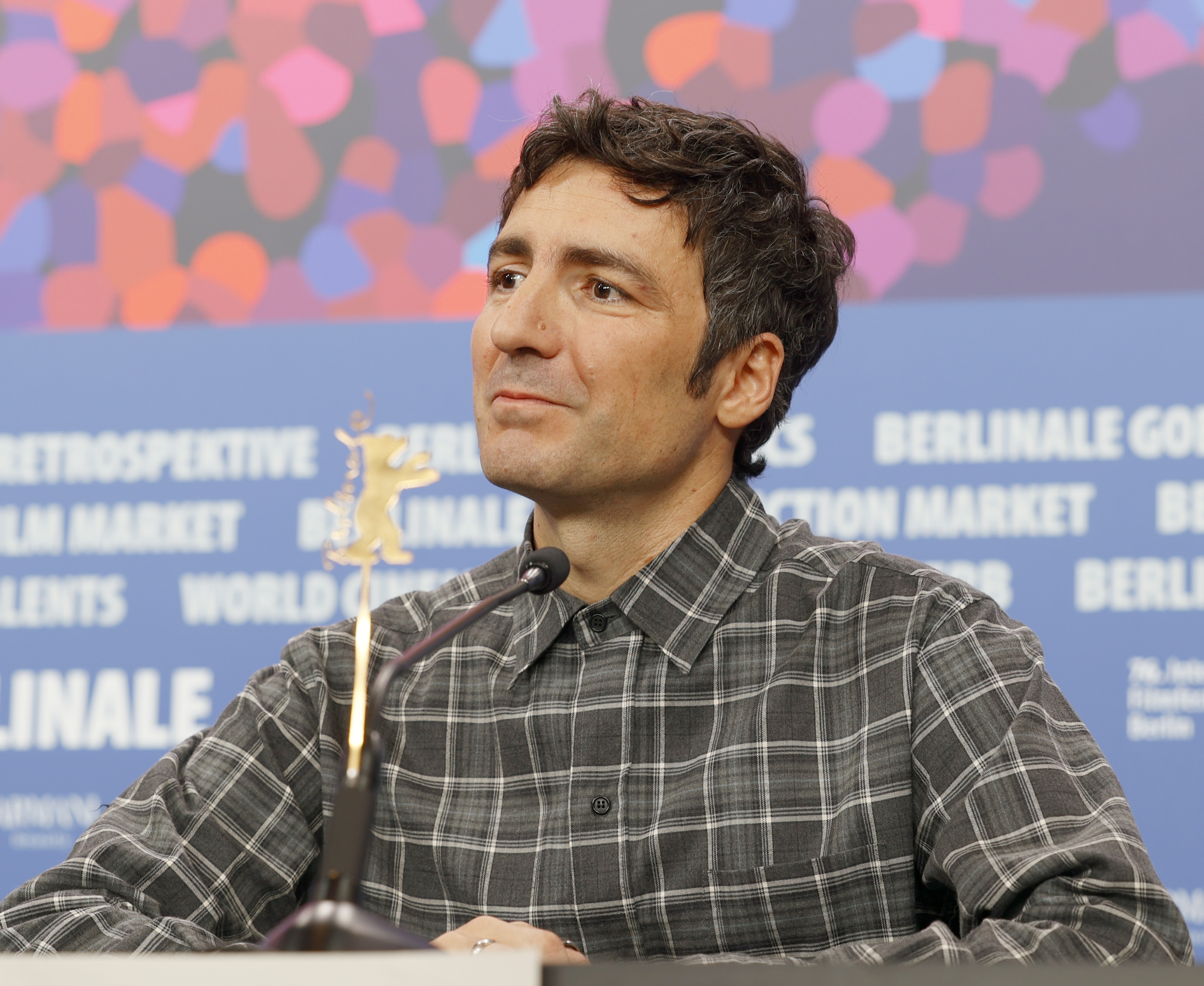
Golden Bear winner: İlker Çatak

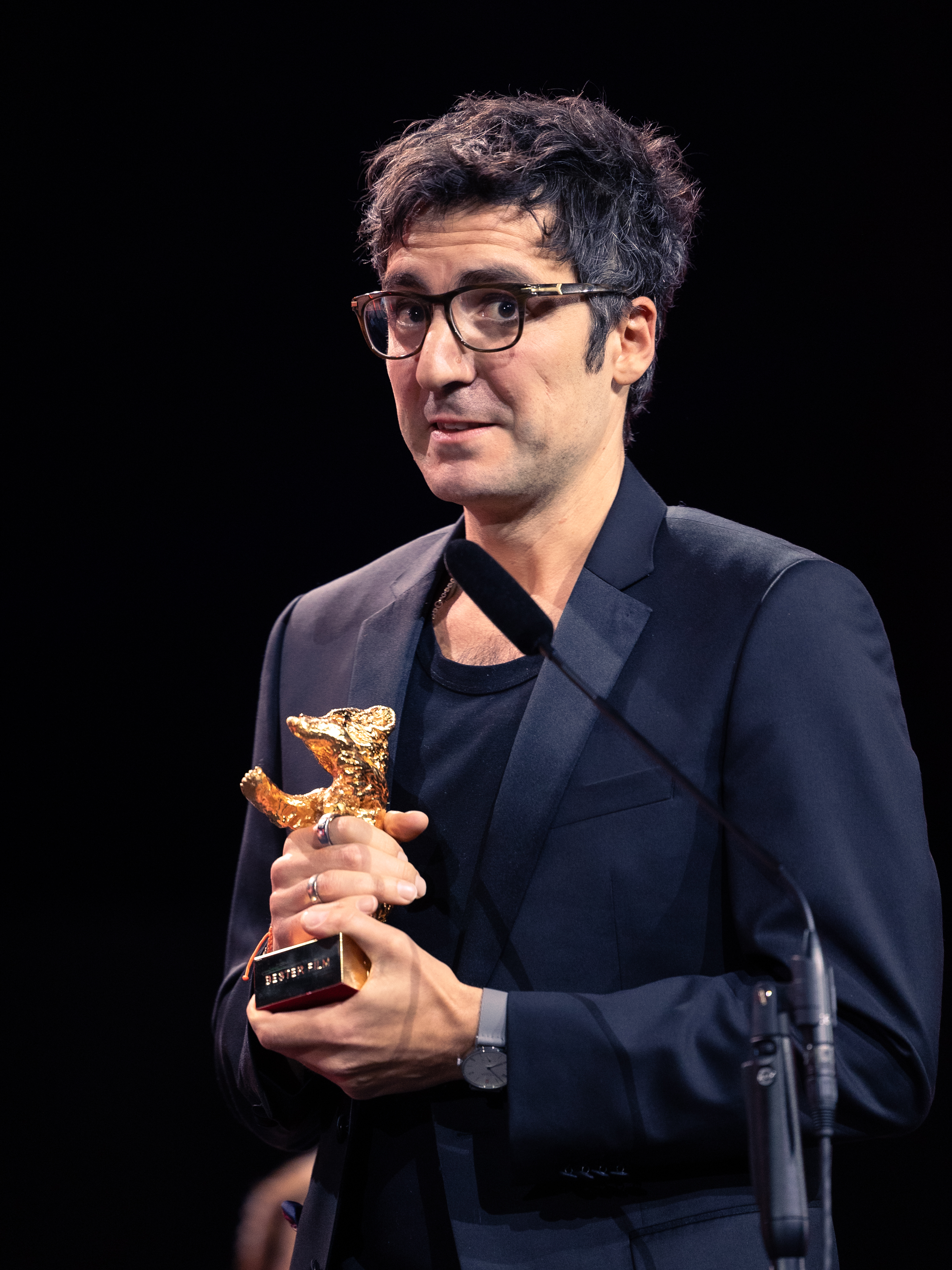

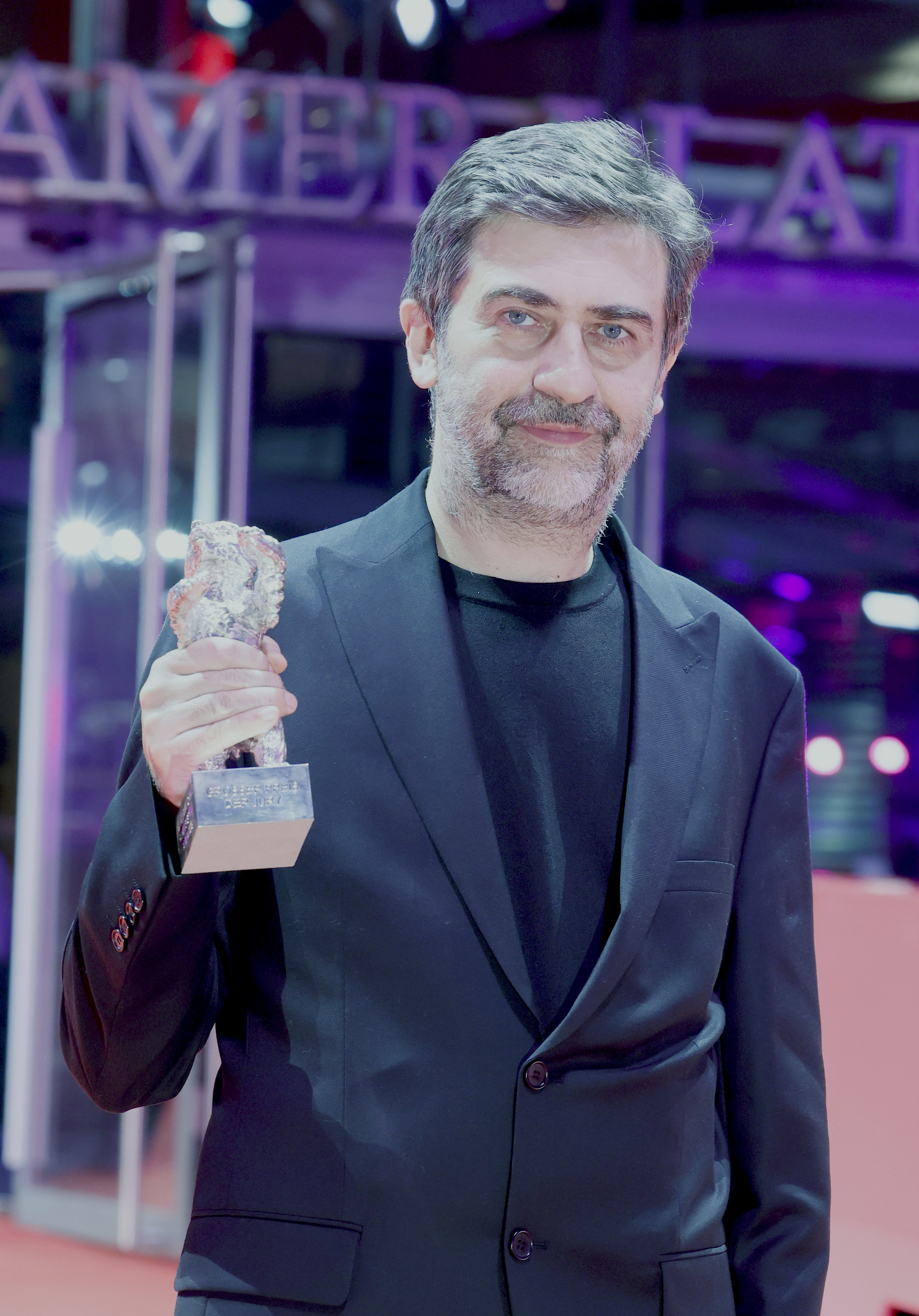
Silver Bear Grand Jury Prize winner: Emin Alper

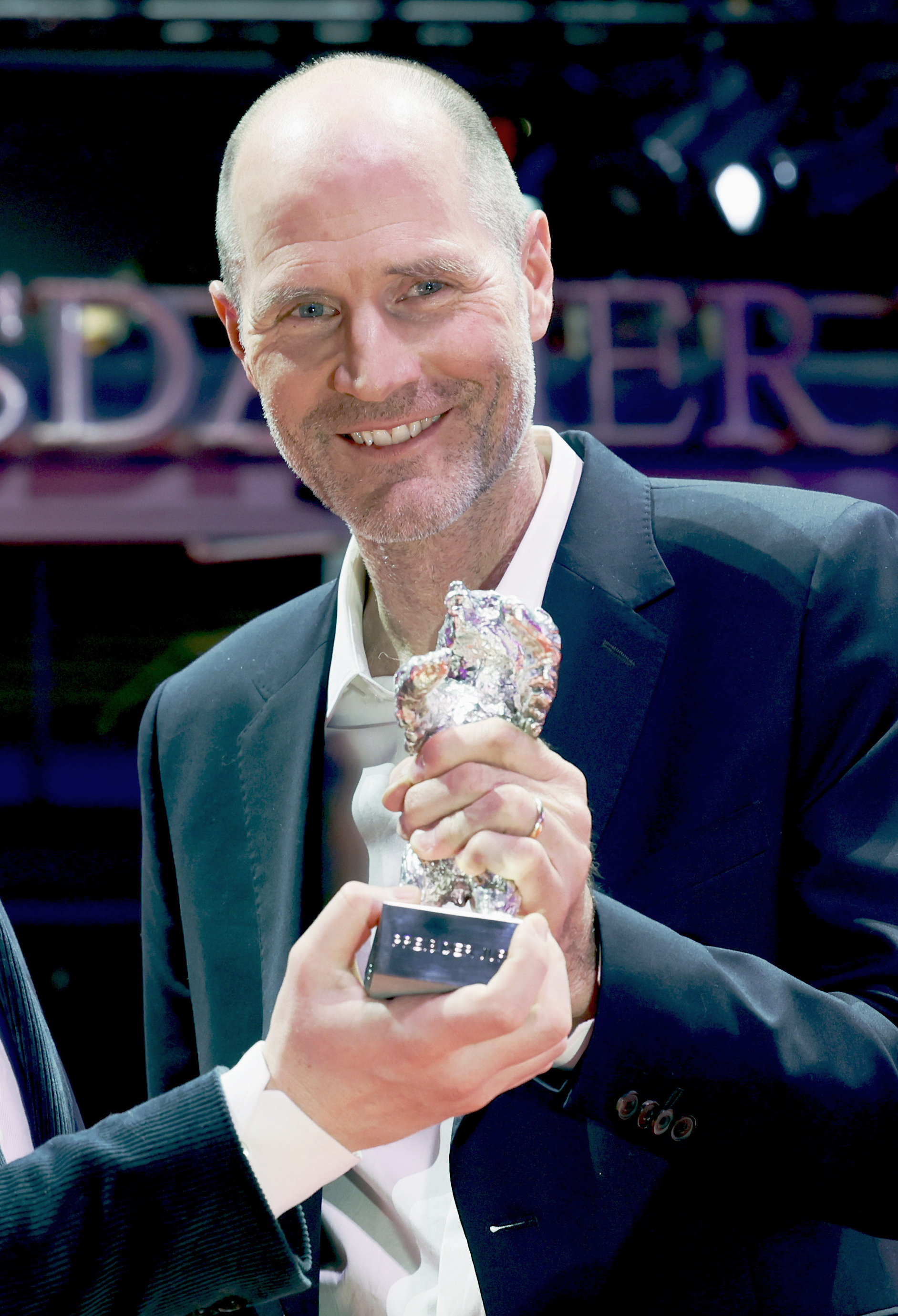
Silver Bear Jury Prize winner: Lance Hammer

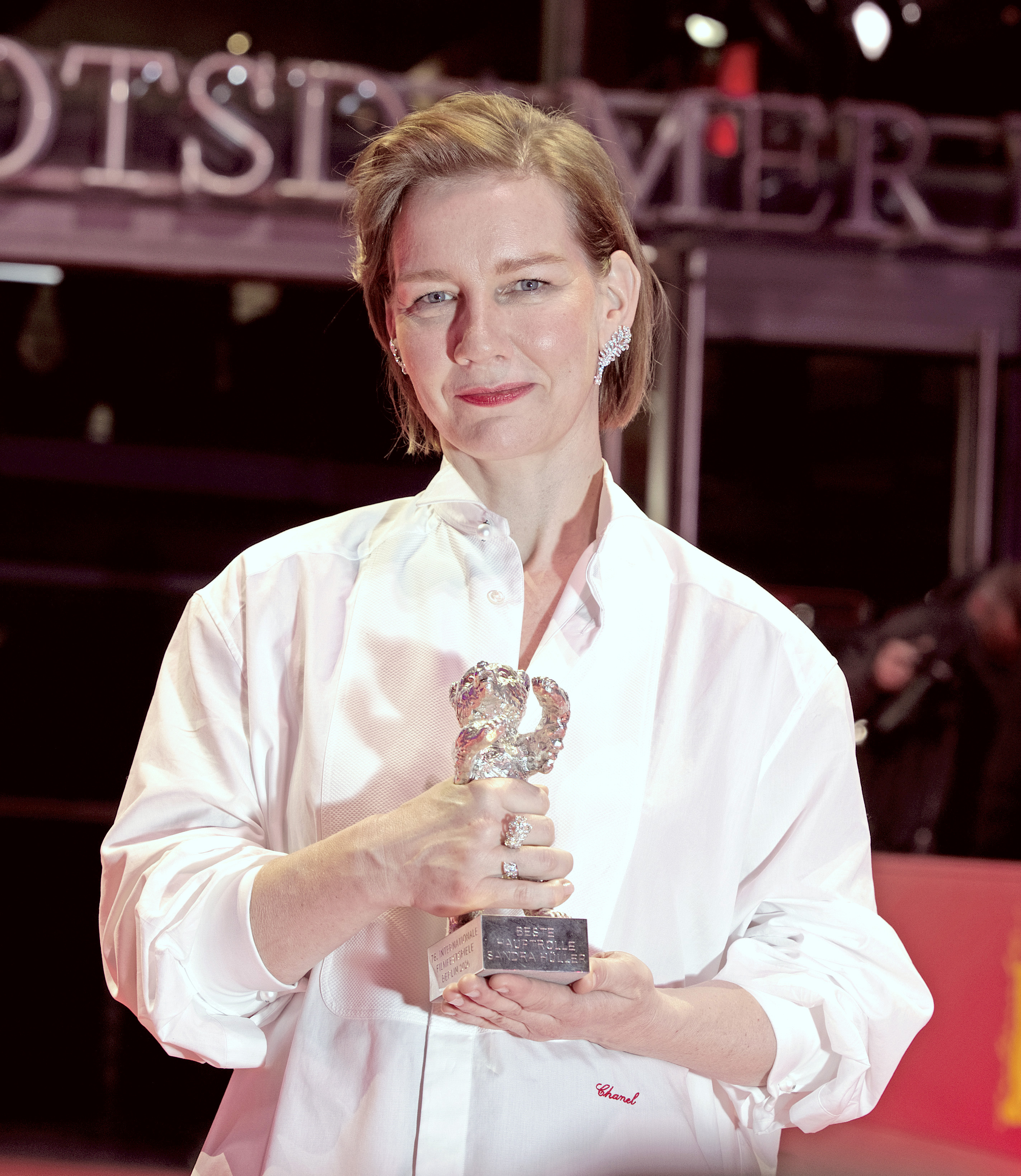
Silver Bear for Best Leading Performance winner: Sandra Hüller

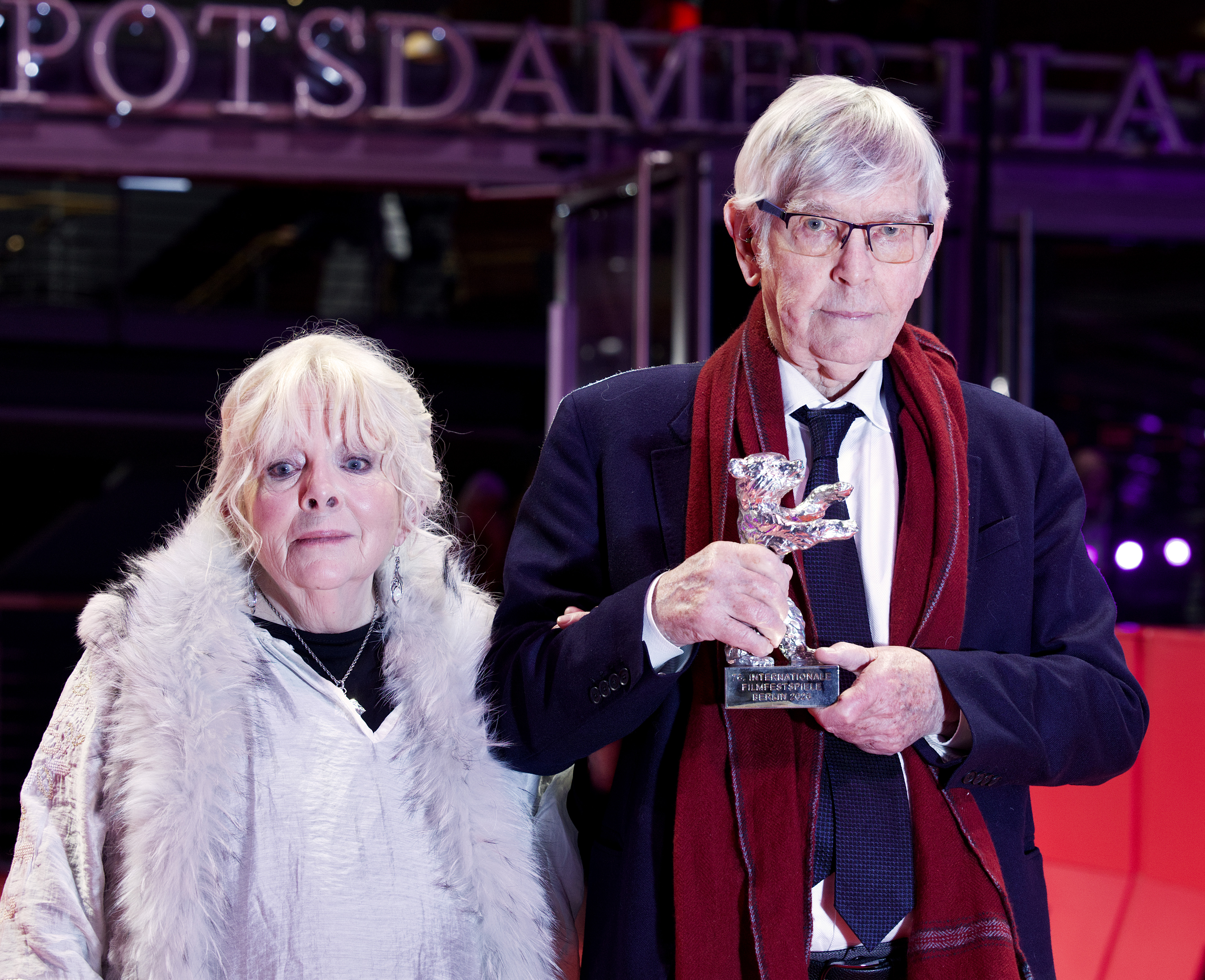
Silver Bear for Best Supporting Performance winners: Tom Courtenay and Anna Calder-Marshall

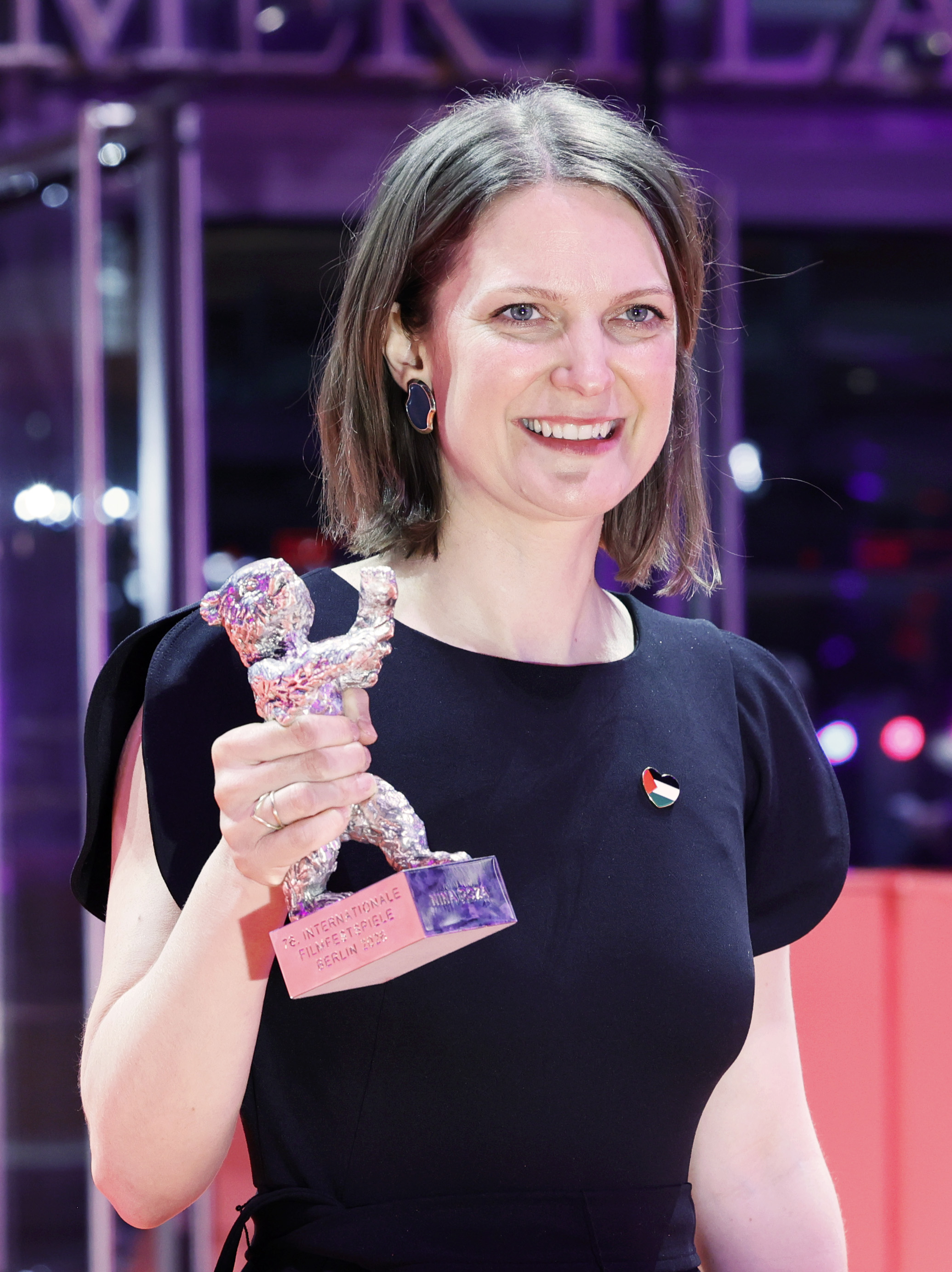
Silver Bear for Best Screenplay winner: Geneviève Dulude-De Celles

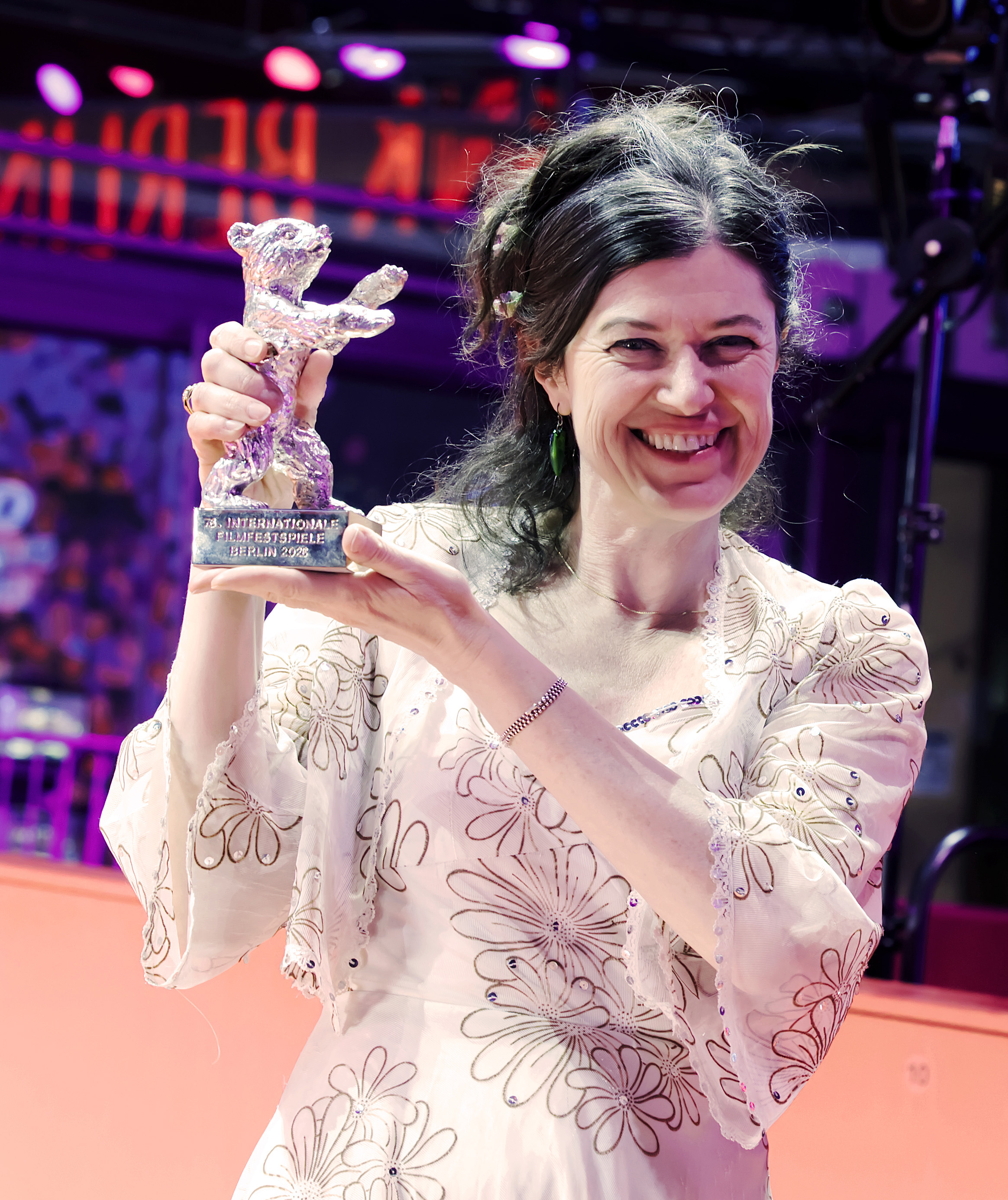
Silver Bear for Outstanding Artistic Contribution winner: Anna Fitch

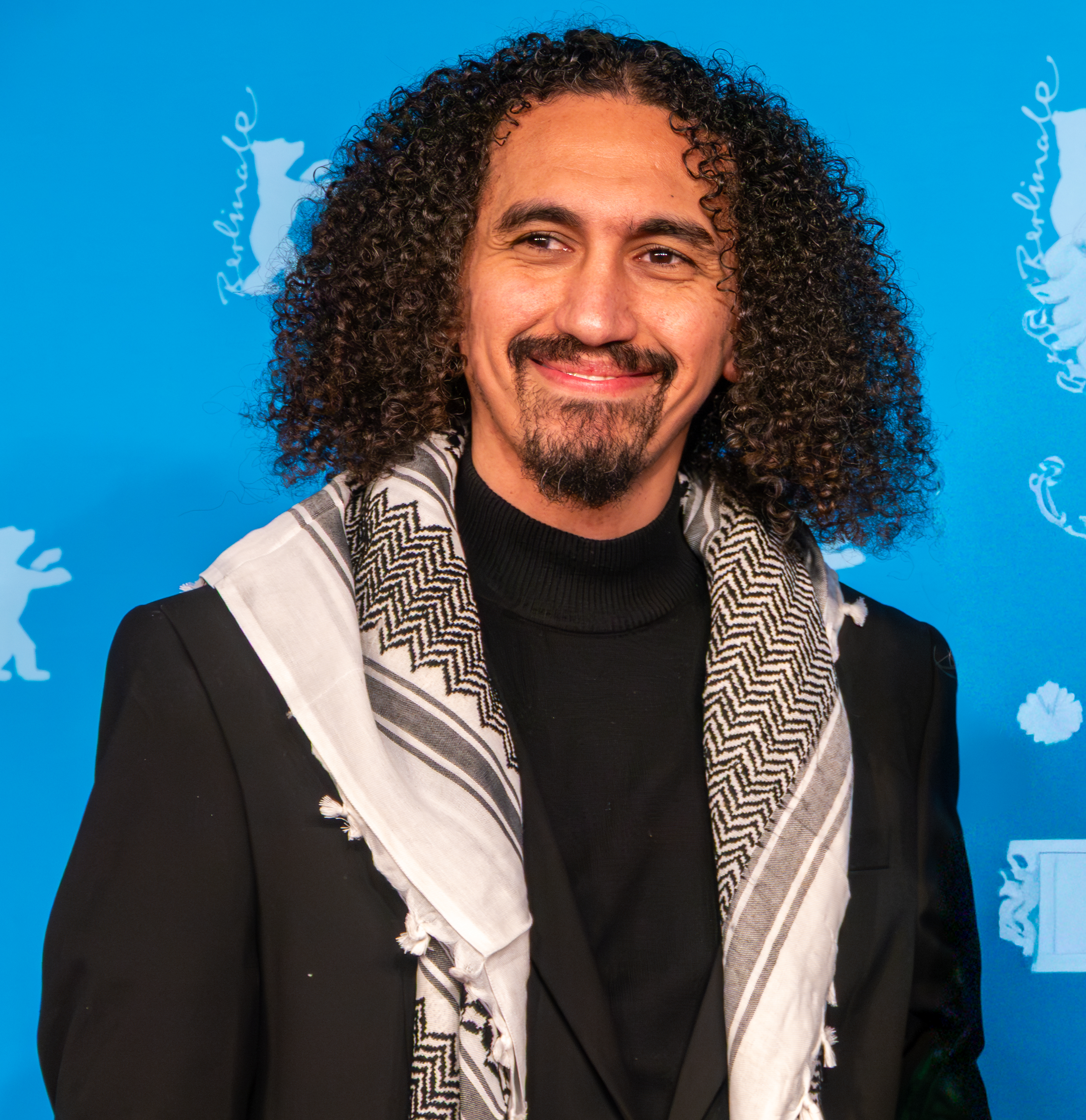
GWFF Best First Feature Award winner: Abdallah Al-Khatib

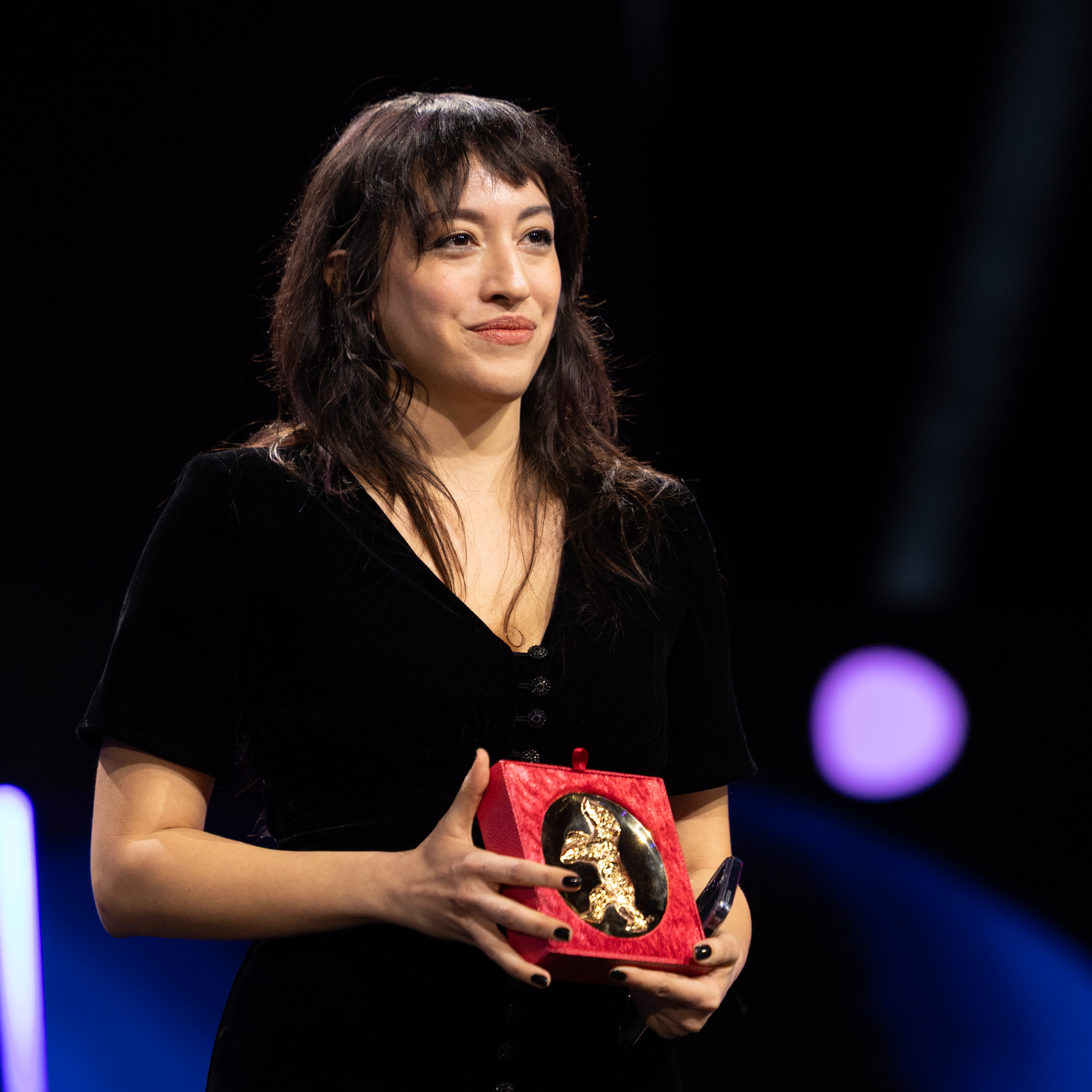
Short Film Golden Bear winner: Marie-Rose Osta

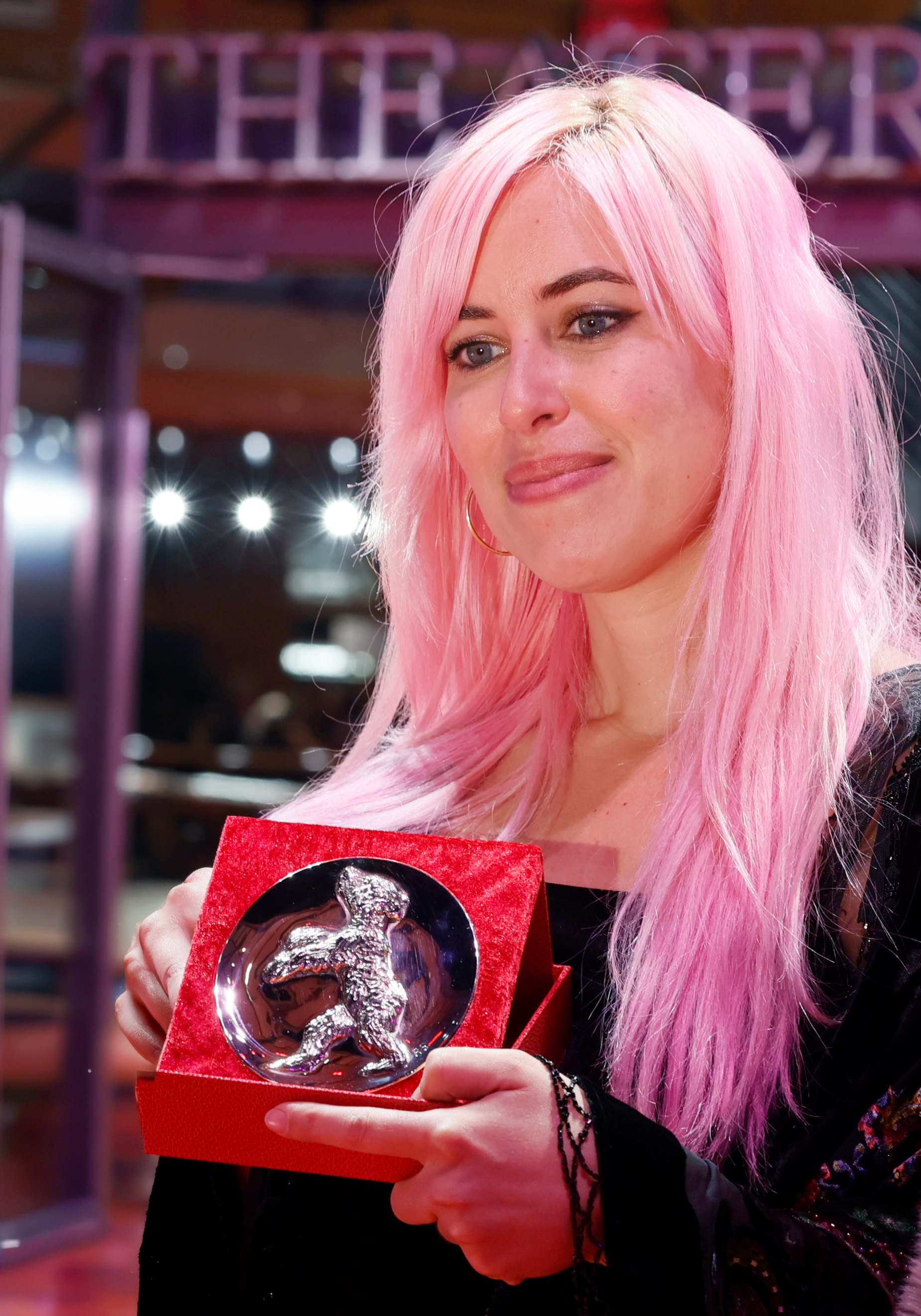
Silver Bear for Best Short Film winner: Fanny Texier

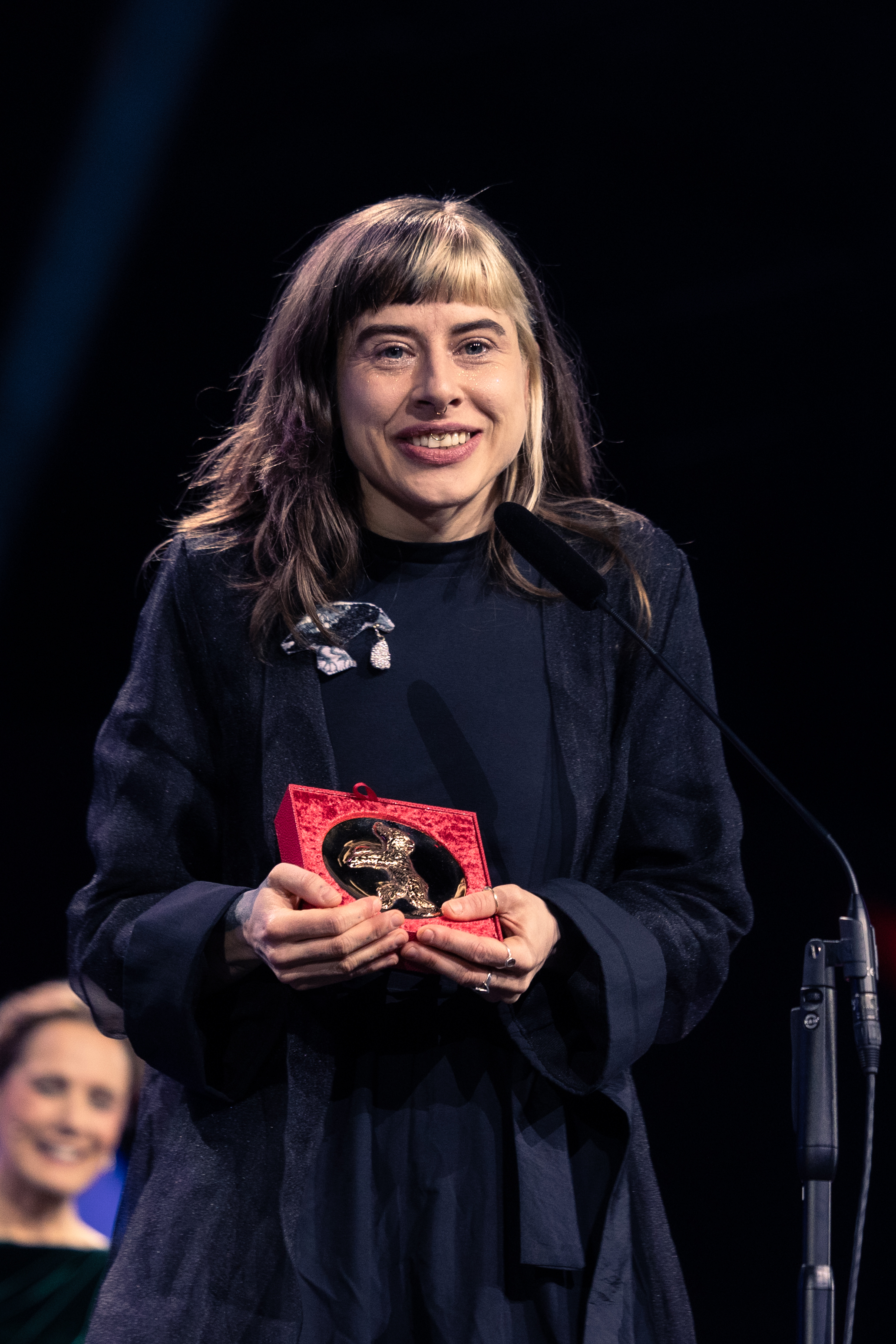
Berlinale Best Documentary Award winner: Pepa Lubojacki

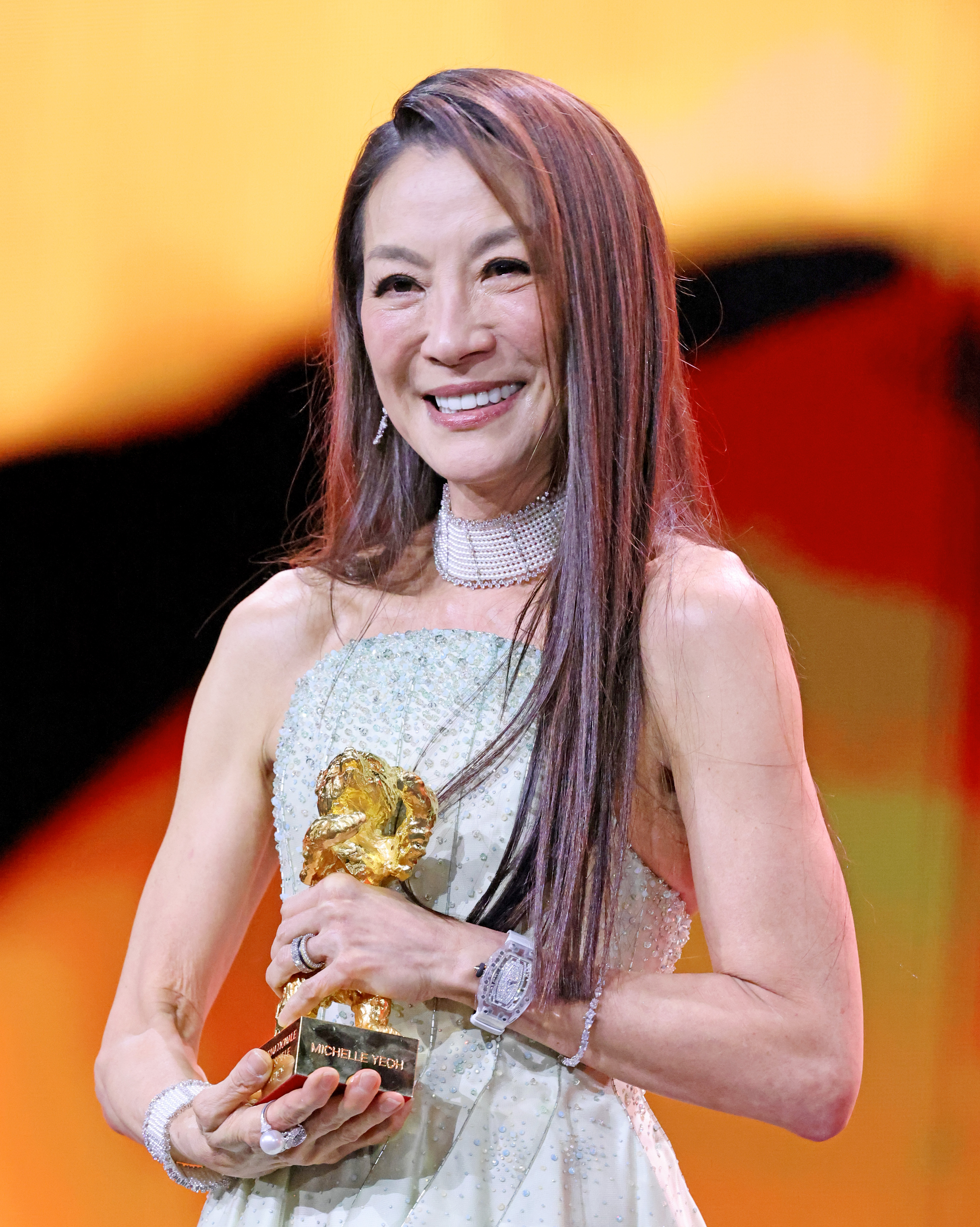
Michelle Yeoh, Honorary Golden Bear winner

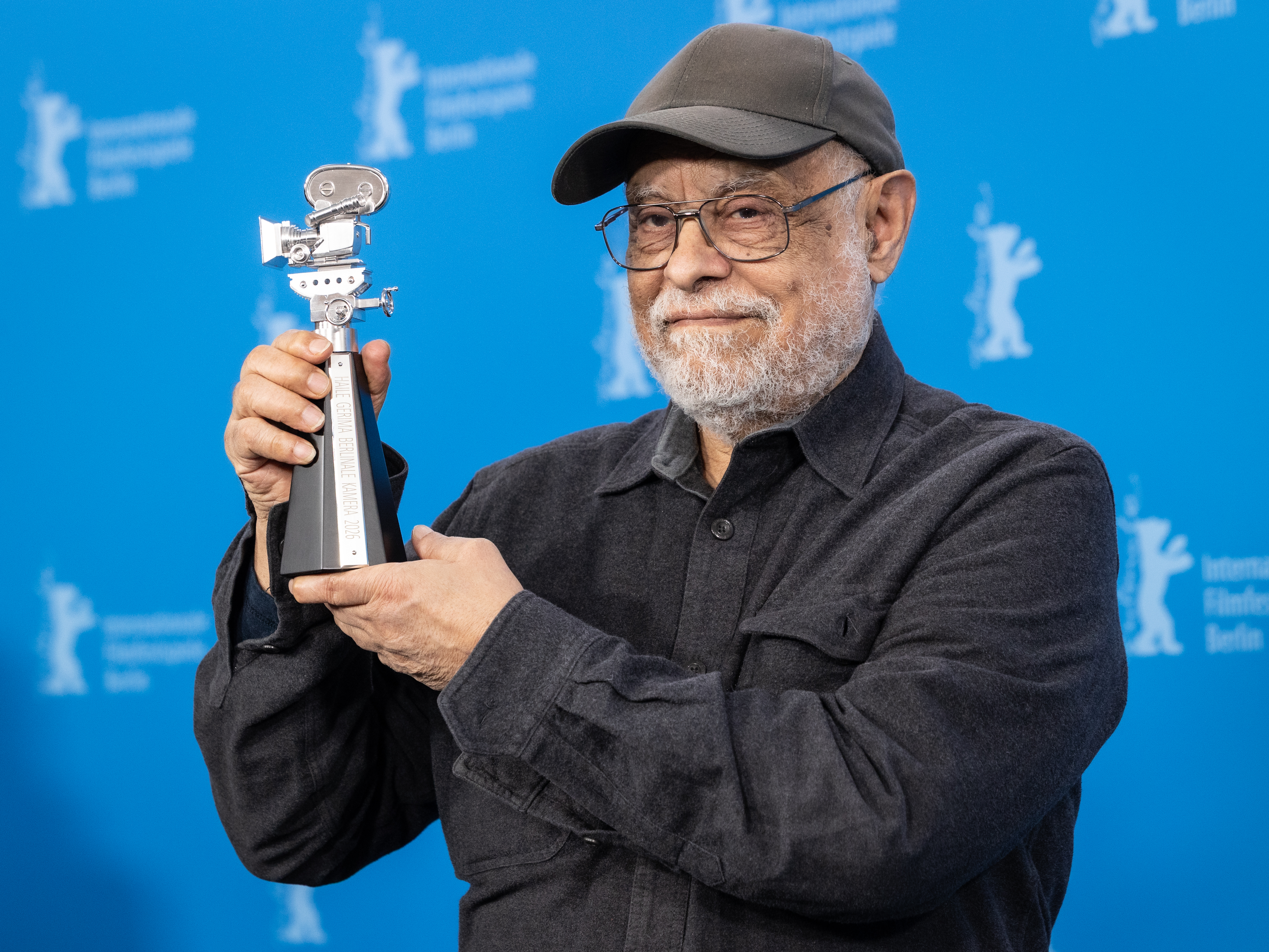
Haile Gerima, Berlinale Camera winner

=== Main Competition ===
- Golden Bear: Yellow Letters by İlker Çatak
- Silver Bear Grand Jury Prize: Salvation by Emin Alper
- Silver Bear Jury Prize: Queen at Sea by Lance Hammer
- Silver Bear for Best Director: Grant Gee for Everybody Digs Bill Evans
- Silver Bear for Best Leading Performance: Sandra Hüller for Rose
- Silver Bear for Best Supporting Performance:
  - Anna Calder-Marshall for Queen at Sea
  - Tom Courtenay for Queen at Sea
- Silver Bear for Best Screenplay: Geneviève Dulude-De Celles for Nina Roza
- Silver Bear for Outstanding Artistic Contribution: Anna Fitch and Banker White for Yo (Love Is a Rebellious Bird)

=== Honorary Golden Bear ===
- Michelle Yeoh

=== Berlinale Camera ===
- Haile Gerima
- Max Richter

=== GWFF Best First Feature Award ===
- Chronicles from the Siege by Abdallah Al-Khatib
  - Special Mention: Forest High by Manon Coubia

=== Berlinale Documentary Award ===
- If Pigeons Turned to Gold by Pepa Lubojacki
  - Special Mention:
    - Tutu by Sam Pollard
    - Sometimes, I Imagine Them All at a Party by Daniela Magnani Hüller

=== Berlinale Short Films Competition ===
- Golden Bear for Best Short Film: Someday a Child by Marie-Rose Osta
- Silver Bear for Best Short Film: A Woman's Place is Everywhere by Fanny Texier
- CUPRA Special Award: Kleptomania by Jingkai Qu

=== Generation – Youth Jury ===
- Crystal Bear for the Best Film in Generation Kplus: Gugu's World by Allan Deberton
  - Special Mention: Not a Hero by Rima Das
- Crystal Bear for the Best Short Film in Generation Kplus: Whale 52 – Suite for Man, Boy, and Whale by Daniel Neiden
  - Special Mention: Under The Wave off Little Dragon by Jian Luo
- Crystal Bear for the Best Film in Generation 14plus: Sad Girlz by Fernanda Tovar
  - Special Mention: A Family by Mees Peijnenburg
- Crystal Bear for the Best Short Film in Generation 14plus: Memories of a Window by Mehraneh Salimian and Amin Pakparvar
  - Special Mention: Nobody Knows the World by Roddy Dextre

=== Generation – International Jury ===
- Grand Prix for the Best Film in Generation Kplus: Gugu's World by Allan Deberton
  - Special Mention: The Atlas of the Universe by Paul Negoescu
- Special Prize for the Best Short Film in Generation Kplus: White by Navroz Shaban
  - Special Mention: Under The Wave off Little Dragon by Jian Luo
- Grand Prix for the Best Film in Generation 14plus: Sad Girlz by Fernanda Tovar
  - Special Mention: Matapanki by Diego Mapache Fuentes
- Special Prize for the Best Short Film in Generation 14plus: The Thread by Fenn O'Meally
  - Special Mention: Memories of a Window by Mehraneh Salimian and Amin Pakparvar

== Independent Awards ==
=== Prize of the Ecumenical Jury ===
- Flies by Fernando Eimbcke (Competition)
- Bucks Harbor by Pete Muller (Panorama)
- River Dreams by Kristina Mikhailova (Forum)

=== FIPRESCI Prizes ===
- Soumsoum, the Night of the Stars by Mahamat-Saleh Haroun (Competition)
- Animol by Ashley Walters (Perspectives)
- Narciso by Marcelo Martinessi (Panorama)
- AnyMart by Yusuke Iwasaki (Forum)

=== Panorama Audience Award ===
- Fiction 1st Place: Prosecution by Faraz Shariat
- Fiction 2nd Place: Four Minus Three by Adrian Goiginger
- Fiction 3rd Place: Mouse by Kelly O'Sullivan and Alex Thompson
- Documentary 1st Place: Traces by Alisa Kovalenko and Marysia Nikitiuk
- Documentary 2nd Place: The Other Side of the Sun by Tawfik Sabouni
- Documentary 3rd Place: Bucks Harbor by Pete Muller

=== Teddy Award ===
- Best Feature Film: Iván & Hadoum by Ian de la Rosa
- Best Documentary: Barbara Forever by Brydie O'Connor
- Best Short Film: Taxi Moto by Gaël Kamilindi
- Jury Award: Trial of Hein by Kai Stänicke
- Special Award: Céline Sciamma

=== Label Europa Cinemas ===
- Four Minus Three by Adrian Goiginger (Panorama)

=== Prize of the Guild of German Arthouse cinemas ===
- Yellow Letters by İlker Çatak
  - Special Mention: The Loneliest Man in Town by Tizza Covi and Rainer Frimmel

=== Readers' Juries ===
- Berliner Morgenpost Readers': Flies by Fernando Eimbcke (Competition)
- Tagesspiegel Readers': I Built a Rocket Imagining Your Arrival by Janaína Marques (Forum)

=== Caligari Film Prize ===
- If Pigeons Turned to Gold by Pepa Lubojacki

=== Peace Film Prize ===
- Tutu by Sam Pollard

=== Amnesty International Film Award ===
- What Will I Become? by Lexie Bean and Logan Rozos

=== Heiner Carow Prize ===
- Prosecution by Faraz Shariat

=== Prize AG Kino – Gilde – Cinema Vision 14plus ===
- What Will I Become? by Lexie Bean and Logan Rozos
  - Special Mention: Sunny Dancer by George Jaques

=== C.I.C.A.E. Art Cinema Award ===
- Prosecution by Faraz Shariat (Panorama)
- On Our Own by Tudor Cristian Jurgiu (Forum)
