= Home Stories =

2026 German film

- German: Etwas ganz Besonderes
- Literally: Something very special
- Directed by: Eva Trobisch
- Written by: Eva Trobisch
- Produced by: Trini Götze; David Armati Lechner
- Starring: Frida Hornemann; Max Riemelt; Eva Löbau; Gina Henkel; Rahel Ohm
- Cinematography: Adrian Campean
- Edited by: Laura Lauzemis
- Music by: Teho Teardo
- Production company: The Bureau
- Release date: 18 February 2026 (Berlinale)
- Running time: 116 minutes
- Country: Germany
- Language: German

Home Stories (German: Etwas ganz Besonderes, lit. 'Something very special') is a 2026 German coming-of-age family drama film written and directed by Eva Trobisch. Starring Frida Hornemann, Max Riemelt, Eva Löbau, Peter René Lüdicke, Rahel Ohm, Gina Henkel and Florian Lukas, the film follows a teenage girl whose search for identity unfolds against the backdrop of her family's struggling hotel business in the forests of former East Germany after she is unable to answer a simple question during a reality TV audition: "Who are you and what defines you?"

The film had its world premiere at the main competition of the 76th Berlin International Film Festival on 18 February 2026, where it was nominated for the Golden Bear.

== Premise ==
A teenage girl's failed attempt to define herself at a TV audition sparks a journey through her fractured family and struggling hometown, forcing her to confront where she comes from in order to understand who she wants to be.

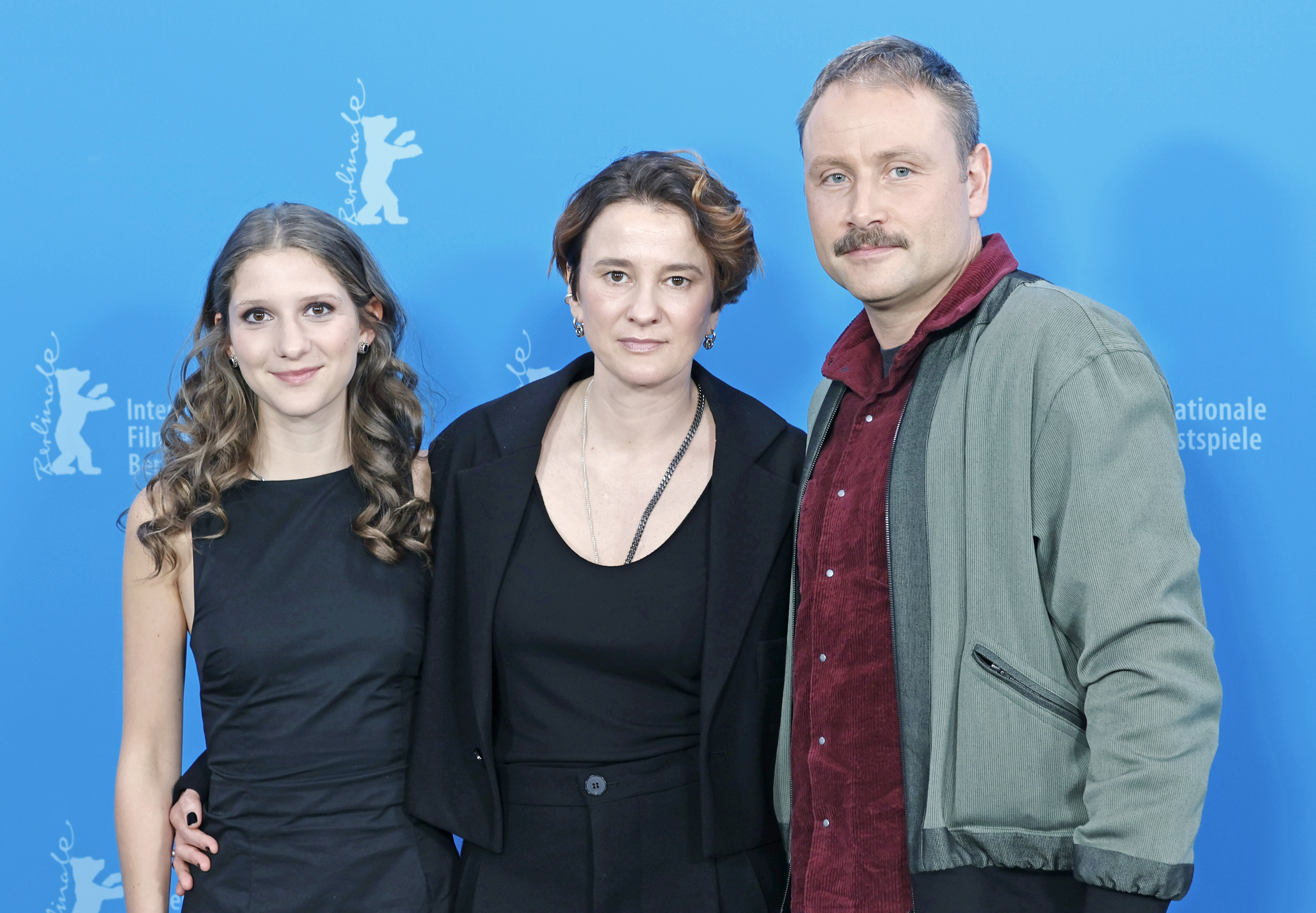
Frida Hornemann, Eva Trobisch and Max Riemelt at the 76th Berlin International Film Festival

== Cast ==
- Frida Hornemann as Lea
- Max Riemelt as Matze
- Eva Löbau as Kati
- Gina Henkel as Rieke
- Rahel Ohm as Christel
- Peter René Lüdecke as Friedrich
- Florian Geißelmann as Edgar
- Yvon Sable Moltzen as Henri
- Ida Fischer as Bonny
- Florian Lukas as Arthur
- Thomas Schubert as Raphael
- Kara Schröder as Caroline
- Anne Kulbatzki as Ina
- Nairi Hadodo as Fee

== Production ==
Home Stories is directed and written by Eva Trobisch and produced by Trimafilm. The film is a co-production with Komplizen Film, if...Productions, and ZDF/ARTE, in collaboration with The Post Republic. International sales are handled by The Match Factory, which is launching the title to buyers ahead of its Berlinale premiere.

== Release ==
The film had its world premiere in competition at the 76th Berlin International Film Festival on 18 February 2026.
