= Black Burns Fast =

- Directed by: Sandulela Asanda
- Written by: Sandulela Asanda
- Produced by: Cait Pansegrouw; Elias Ribeiro
- Starring: Esihle Ndleleni; Muadi Ilung; Mila Smith; Khensani Khoza; Ntsimedi Gwangwa; Basetsana Motloung
- Cinematography: Pierre De Villiers
- Edited by: Talya Kahan
- Production company: Urucu Media
- Release date: July 2025
- Running time: 100 minutes
- Country: South Africa
- Languages: English; Xhosa

Black Burns Fast is a 2025 coming-of-age film written and directed by Sandulela Asanda. It premiered at Durban International Film Festival in 2025 before being shown at Berlinale in 2026. Starring Esihle Ndleleni, Muadi Ilung, Mila Smith, Khensani Khoza, Ntsimedi Gwangwa and Basetsana Motloung, it follows seventeen-year-old Luthando and her Black friends in a majority-white boarding school in South Africa. It is produced by South African company Urucu Media.

== Premise ==
Seventeen-year-old Luthando returns for another year at a prestigious South African all-girls’ boarding school. As a Black scholarship student in a majority-white, conservative school, Luthando, focuses on attaining good grades. When Ayanda, a new student, arrives at the school, the two begin a secret romance that eventually threatens Luthando's scholarship and her relationship with her mother.

== Production ==
In a director's statement for Berlinale, filmmaker Sandulela Asanda said about her motivation for the film: "[t]he pressure and heat of these expectations that I felt as a queer Black teenager inspired me to write this film [...]. I wrote this film for a younger me and other Black girls to show the jubilation of girlhood and that there is joy to be had outside of the things that confine us." Moreover, the director hopes that the film's "comedic approach" makes audiences more comfortable to discuss issues such as racism, classism, sexism and homophobia present in South African society and schools.

== Release and reception ==
=== Release ===
The film had its world premiere in the Durban International Film Festival in 2025 before being shown in the 'Generation 14plus' section of the 76th Berlin International Film Festival in February 2026. For its North American premiere, it was programmed in the Seattle International Film Festival. It was also programmed at BFI Flare: London LGBTIQ+ Film Festival and XPOSED Queer Film Festival Berlin.

Amazon Prime holds the rights for world sales.

=== Reception ===
In an interview with the film director, Poppy Scarborough of BuzzFeed appreciates "Black Burns Fast" as a "Black lesbian film" that expands the representation of Black lesbians beyond "all studs or like masculine".

Hailey Passmore of Filmotomy writes that "Black Burns Fast is confident and witty, just what you would hope for in a coming-of-age film".
