= Trial of Hein =

- German: Der Heimatlose
- Directed by: Kai Stänicke
- Screenplay by: Kai Stänicke
- Produced by: Dirk Decker; Andrea Schütte; Dario Suter
- Starring: Paul Boche; Emilia Schüle; Philip Froissant
- Cinematography: Florian Mag
- Edited by: Susanne Ocklitz
- Music by: Damian Scholl
- Production company: Tamtam Film
- Distributed by: DCM; Heretic
- Release date: 13 February 2026 (Berlinale)
- Running time: 122 minutes
- Country: Germany
- Language: German

Trial of Hein (German: Der Heimatlose) is a German drama film, directed by Kai Stänicke and released in 2026.

The film stars Paul Boche as Hein, a man who returns to his home village on a small German island in the North Sea after 14 years away. With his mother suffering from dementia and his younger sister Heide (Stephanie Amarell) having been too young when he left to have any concrete memory of him, the community is distrustful of whether he really is who he claims to be, and places him on trial to prove his identity after his own memories of his prior life in the community fail to correspond to theirs.

The cast also includes Philip Froissant and Emilia Schüle as Hein's childhood friends Friedemann and Greta, who hold the key to the truth but are not defending Hein, and Frederick Lepthien and Emil Hauss as Hein in childhood flashbacks, as well as Aaron Hilmer as Volker, Jeanette Hain as Jorinde and Sebastian Blomberg as Hauke in supporting roles.

== Production ==
According to Stänicke, the film's screenplay was inspired by his discovery, after coming out as LGBTQ, that because he had dealt with his sexual orientation in private rather than being open about his struggle to come to terms with it, some of his childhood memories did not match the memories of his family and friends. To give the film an air of theatricality rather than realism, Stänicke wrote the screenplay in an archaic, rather than contemporary, dialect of German.

The film was shot on the German islands of Norderney and Sylt. The film's set design, inspired in part by Lars von Trier's 2003 film Dogville, sees the villagers living in houses that consist of outer facades without roofs or interior walls.

== Distribution ==
The film premiered on 13 February 2026 as the opening film of the Perspectives program at the 76th Berlin International Film Festival. It will be distributed commercially in Germany by DCM, and internationally by Heretic.

== Critical response ==
Lee Marshall of Screen Daily wrote that "the tactile realism of a film that was shot largely on the German Frisian islands of Norderney and Sylt is also brought home by costumes so roughly spun they feel itchy, by the weathered authenticity of the production design, by a palette of washed-out colours, by the swish of waves on the sand and the hiss of wind in the dry grass. Rising above this soundscape in short, cadenced bursts, Damian Scholl’s enjoyably spare and sometimes just a little arch soundtrack lays melancholy bowed violin and viola notes over pizzicato cello."

For Cineuropa, Olivia Popp wrote that "With its profoundly emotional staying power, Trial of Hein is crafted from the building blocks of universal dualities: of coming and going, of staying and leaving, of loss and discovery, of hopelessness and hope, of belonging and estrangement. Stänicke manages to strike a balance between a very simple screenplay and an intricate tapestry of topics, removing twists, turns and other distractions to allow viewers to connect on an individual level with these deeply human binaries. The movie’s refusal to be flashy becomes its greatest strength, flexing its ability to reach into the viewer’s soul and past self to touch buried emotions, activating and entrapping them gently like a Venus flytrap – and this it does lovingly and with flying colours."

== Awards ==
Award	Date of ceremony	Category	Recipient(s)	Result	Ref.
Teddy Award	20 February 2026	Jury Prize	Kai Stänicke	Won	
