= Flies (2026 film) =

2026 Mexican film

- Theatrical release poster
- Spanish: Moscas
- Directed by: Fernando Eimbcke
- Written by: Vanesa Garnica; Fernando Eimbcke
- Produced by: Eréndira Núñez Larios; Michel Franco; Fernando Eimbcke
- Cinematography: Maria Secco
- Edited by: Salvador Reyes Zúñiga; Fernando Eimbcke
- Production companies: Kinotitlán; Teorema
- Distributed by: Mubi (Mexico); A Contracorriente Films (Spain)
- Release dates: 18 February 2026 (Berlinale); 2 July 2026 (Mexico); 23 October 2026 (Spain)
- Running time: 99 minutes
- Countries: Mexico; Spain
- Language: Spanish

Flies (Spanish: Moscas) is a 2026 comedy-drama film directed by Fernando Eimbcke, co-written by Eimbcke and Vanesa Garnica and produced by Michel Franco and Eréndira Núñez Larios. Set in contemporary Mexico City, the film follows the journey of an 9-year-old boy and a middle-aged woman in the wake of the hospitalization of the boy's mother.

The film had its world premiere at the main competition of the 76th Berlin International Film Festival on 18 February 2026, where it won the Prize of the Ecumenical Jury.

== Premise ==
Olga lives a strictly regulated, solitary life in a vast block of flats, with no friends or close relationships. When financial necessity forces her to rent out a room, a man moves in and secretly brings along his nine-year-old son. To her own surprise, Olga begins to form an unlikely bond with the child. As her carefully controlled world starts to shift, the lives of the three strangers gradually and unexpectedly become intertwined.

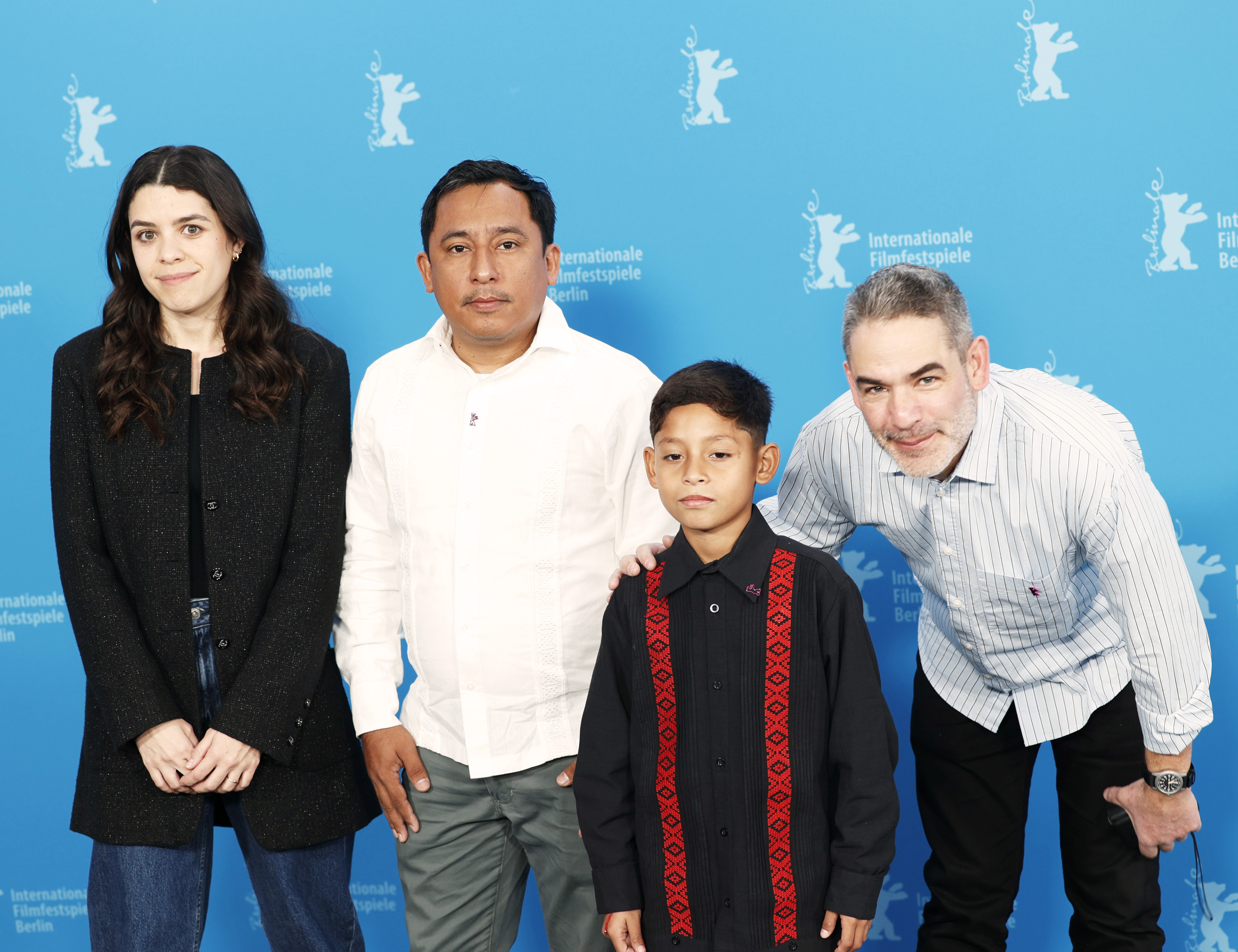
Erendira Nunez Larios, Hugo Ramírez, Bastian Escobar and Fernando Eimbcke at the 76th Berlin International Film Festival

== Cast ==
- Teresita Sánchez as Olga
- Bastian Escobar as Cristian
- Hugo Ramírez as Tulio

== Production ==
Flies marks a creative reunion between Eimbcke and Franco, who began their careers together making short films in the 1990s. The screenplay was written by Eimbcke and his longtime collaborator Vanesa Garnica.

The project was presented as a work-in-progress at the San Sebastián International Film Festival as part of the WIP Latam showcase. Eimbcke introduced the film alongside other Latin American projects selected for the industry platform. The film is produced by Eimbcke's banner Kinotitlán in collaboration with Franco and Núñez Larios through their production company Teorema. Actress Teresita Sánchez was announced in the lead role of Olga during the presentation.

The film was a Mexican-Spanish co-production by Kintotitlán and Teorema along with K&S Films and Nephilim Producciones.

== Release ==
Alpha Violet acquired worldwide sales rights to the film, excluding Spain, ahead of its premiere in competition at the Berlin International Film Festival. Spanish distributor A Contracorriente Films picked up local distribution following the project's presentation at the San Sebastián International Film Festival work-in-progress showcase. In April 2026, Mubi acquired Latin American distribution rights to the film, planning to theatrically release it sometime in the second half of 2026. The film is scheduled to be released in Mexico on 2 July 2026.

The Academia Mexicana de Artes y Ciencias Cinematográficas (AMACC) submitted the film for the Goya Award for Best Ibero-American Film for the 41st Goya Awards.

The film will be screened for Japanese Premiere on 27 October 2026 in the World Focus section of the 39th Tokyo International Film Festival.

== Reception ==
Reviewing for The Hollywood Reporter, David Rooney underscored how "small is beautiful" in the bottom line.

Javier Ocaña of El País assessed that while the story is minimal the charm of the proposal and Eimbcke's mise-en-scène hold the whole together.
