= Don't Come Out =

2026 Dominican Republic films

- Poster
- Spanish: No salgas
- Directed by: Victoria Linares Villegas
- Written by: Victoria Linares Villegas; Carlos Marranzini
- Produced by: Victoria Linares Villegas; Carlos Marranzini
- Starring: Cecile van Welie; Camila Issa; Gabriela Cortés; Camila Santana; Mariela Guerrero
- Cinematography: Jaime Guerra
- Edited by: Erik Alfredo Martinez
- Music by: Oscar Chabebe
- Production company: El perro de Argento
- Release date: 16 February 2026 (Berlinale)
- Running time: 105 minutes
- Country: Dominican Republic
- Language: Spanish

Don't Come Out (Spanish: No salgas) is a 2026 Dominican Republic coming-of-age drama horror film directed, produced, and written by Victoria Linares Villegas in her fiction feature directorial debut, from a screenplay she wrote with Carlos Alberto Marranzini Rodríguez. It stars Cecile van Welie as Liz, a closeted woman who goes on a weekend trip with her friends. It also stars Camila Issa, Gabriela Cortés, Camila Santana, and Mariela Guerrero.

It had its world premiere at the Generation 14plus section of the 76th Berlin International Film Festival on 16 February 2026.

== Premise ==
A closeted medical student grieving the death of her girlfriend joins her friends on a weekend trip, where she grows close to a mysterious young woman.

== Cast ==
- Cecile van Welie as Liz
- Camila Issa as Laura
- Gabriela Cortés as Danielle
- Camila Santana as Jessie
- Mariela Guerrero as Wendy

== Production ==
In an interview with Diva, Villegas said that the film was inspired by an image that her co-writer Carlos Marranzini had in his head: "four girls driving on a highway in the dead of night, covered in blood". They tried to uncover the story behind that image through the film. Regarding the film genre, Villegas told Caribbean Beat that she felt that "horror could be a broader way of exploring the dangers of coming out" in Dominican Republic.

== Release ==
Don't Come Out had its world premiere at the Generation 14plus section of the 76th Berlin International Film Festival on 16 February 2026. Prior to its premiere, ArtHood Entertainment acquired the film's world sales rights.
