= Gugu's World =

2026 Brazilian coming-of-age drama film

- Theatrical release poster
- Portuguese: Feito Pipa
- Directed by: Allan Deberton
- Written by: André Araújo
- Produced by: Karen Castanho; Bianca Villar; Fernando Fraiha; Allan Deberton
- Starring: Yuri Gomes; Lázaro Ramos; Teca Pereira; Carlos Francisco; Georgina Castro
- Cinematography: Renata Monteiro
- Edited by: Paulo Tavares
- Music by: Luiza Lins
- Production companies: Biônica Filmes; Deberton Filmes
- Release date: 13 February 2026 (Berlinale)
- Running time: 94 minutes
- Country: Brazil
- Language: Portuguese

Gugu's World (Portuguese: Feito Pipa) is a 2026 Brazilian coming‑of‑age drama film directed by Allan Deberton and written by André Araújo. Starring Yuri Gomes as Gugu, it follows a queer teenager navigating friendship, desire, and self‑discovery in a small town in northeastern Brazil.

The film had its world premiere in the Generation Kplus section of the 76th Berlin International Film Festival on 13 February 2026, where it won the Crystal Bear. It was selected as the Brazilian entry for the Best International Feature Film at the 99th Academy Awards.

== Plot ==
Gugu lives in a small Ceará community with his grandmother Dilma, who raised him after the death of his mother, Elaine, and dreams of becoming a football player. His father Batista, who has remarried to Patricia, has strict views on masculinity that make him disapprove of Gugu expressing himself in effeminate ways such as dancing and wearing make-up.

As Dilma begins showing signs of dementia, Gugu becomes afraid of losing the only home where he feels understood. He tries to hide her worsening condition from those around them, fearing that Batista will take him away. During this time, Gugu learns more about his mother's death. Elaine had opposed the construction of the local reservoir and was killed after speaking out.

When Dilma collapses at home, Batista intervenes and places her in a nursing home, forcing Gugu to move into his father's house. Struggling to adapt to his new life, Gugu misses his grandma and finds it difficult to connect with Batista despite Patricia's attempts to ease the tension between them. After Batista teaches Gugu how to ride a motorcycle, they visit Dilma at the nursing home. Nonetheless, Gugu remains unhappy about their separation.

After another conflict at home, Gugu runs away late at night to see his grandma. In the film's final scene, he rides away on a motorcycle with Dilma behind him, leaving the ending open to interpretation as either a real escape or an expression of Gugu's longing to be reunited with her.

== Cast ==
- Yuri Gomes as Gugu
- Lázaro Ramos as Batista
- Teca Pereira as Dilma
- Carlos Francisco as Valmir
- Georgina Castro as Patrícia
- David Santos as Gil

== Production ==
André Araújo and Allan Deberton wrote the script based on their experiences growing up in Russas, Ceará. Deberton declared that both were raised by their grandmothers and grew feeling themselves "out of place", telling the story of a queer child affectionately raised by his grandmother. Protagonist Yuri Gomes was cast out of a group of 700 children. Most of the film was recorded in Quixadá.

== Release ==
Gugu's World premiered on 13 February 2026 in the Generation Kplus section at the Berlin International Film Festival. After screenings in various film festivals, distributor Paris Filmes organized the Brazilian premiere in the filming location of Quixadá on 10 September, where it would remain for a week to fit the eligibility period for potential Academy Award for Best International Feature Film nominees. The film would then see advance screenings in Juazeiro do Norte between 17 and 23 September and a wide release on 5 November.

Berlin-based M-Appeal secured international sales rights to the film ahead of its world premiere.

== Reception ==
Gugu's World received positive reviews from international and Brazilian critics. Variety praised the film's “tender, unforced performances” and its “sensitive portrayal of queer adolescence in Brazil’s northeast.” Omelete gave it a 5/5 grade, describing it as an engaging film, capable of raising hopes for a sensitive and inclusive country and escaping from stereotypes. O Globo emphasized the film's regional setting and its contribution to a growing wave of LGBTQ‑themed Brazilian cinema.

=== Accolades ===
Ceremony	Year	Category	Nomination	Result	Ref.
Berlin International Film Festival	2026	Crystal Bear for the Best Film in Generation Kplus	Gugu's World	Won	
Berlin International Film Festival	2026	Grand Prix for the Best Film in Generation Kplus	Gugu's World	Won	
Cartagena International Film Festival	2026	Best Acting	Yuri Gomes	Won	
Guadalajara International Film Festival	2026	Maguey Award for Best Film	Allan Deberton	Won	
Guadalajara International Film Festival	2026	Best Acting	Yuri Gomes and Teca Pereira	Won	
Gramado Film Festival	2026	Best Direction	Allan Deberton	Won	
Gramado Film Festival	2026	Best Actress	Teca Pereira	Won	
Gramado Film Festival	2026	Best Supporting Actor	Lázaro Ramos	Won	
Gramado Film Festival	2026	Honorable Mention	Yuri Gomes	Won	
Gramado Film Festival	2026	Best Picture - Popular Vote	Gugu's World	Won	
Out on Film	2026	Best Fiction Feature	Gugu's World	Won	
Out on Film	2026	Best Direction	Allan Deberton	Won	
Out on Film	2026	Best Acting	Teca Pereira	Won	
Huelva Ibero-American Film Festival	2026	Audience Award for Best Film — Official Selection	Gugu's World	Won	

== See also ==
- List of submissions to the 99th Academy Awards for Best International Feature Film
- List of Brazilian submissions for the Academy Award for Best International Feature Film
