= The Best Friend =

2024 Brazilian romantic comedy film

- Theatrical film poster
- Portuguese: O Melhor Amigo
- Directed by: Allan Deberton
- Written by: Otavio Chamorro; Raul Damasceno; Allan Deberton; Pedro Karam
- Produced by: Allan Deberton; Marcelo Pinheiro
- Starring: Vinicius Teixeira; Gabriel Fuentes
- Cinematography: Beto Martins
- Edited by: Victor Costa Lopes; Germano De Oliveira
- Music by: Herlon Robson
- Release dates: November 18, 2024 (streaming); March 13, 2025 (cinema)
- Running time: 96 mins.
- Country: Brazil
- Language: Portuguese

The Best Friend (Portuguese: O Melhor Amigo) is a 2024 Brazilian LGBTQ+ independent musical romantic comedy film directed by Allan Deberton, adapted from his own short by the same name. The film stars Vinicius Teixeira and Gabriel Fuentes. It premiered on Mix Brasil in 2024, before a limited theatrical release throughout Brazil in 2025.

== Synopsis ==
On Canoa Quebrada beach, the reunion between two friends rekindles old desires.

== Cast ==
- Vinícius Teixeira as Lucas
- Gabriel Fuentes as Felipe
- Léo Bahia as Martin
- Cláudia Ohana as Estrela Davis
- Mateus Carrieri as José
- Solange Teixeira as Roberta

== Reception ==
Zachary Wild of The Rectangular View praised the aesthetics: "[The film] is one of the most refreshing movies I've seen in years. It takes place in a laid-back beach community full of vibrant colors, beautiful backgrounds, and a cast of flirtatious characters who set the tone."

Frank J. Avella of The Contending lauded certain aspects: "It's certainly a unique and curious movie. And Gabriel Fuentes has a smoldering quality that will make gay men want to swoon (count me among them) so that is more than enough to keep gay audiences enthralled."

Meanwhile, Emilie Black of Cinema Crazed found it indulgent: "[The film] is a romantic comedy telling a tale of wanting, lust, loss, and taking risks that may not all pay off. There is a lot in here and sometimes there is too much here."
