= 32nd Sarajevo Film Festival =

2026 film festival in Sarajevo, Bosnia and Herzegovina

- Official poster
- Opening film: Fatherland, by Paweł Pawlikowski
- Closing film: No Man's Land, by Danis Tanović
- Location: Sarajevo, Bosnia and Herzegovina
- Founded: 1995
- Awards: Heart of Sarajevo: Everytime by Sandra Wollner
- Hosted by: Directorate of Sarajevo Film Festival
- No. of films: 250
- Festival date: Opening: 14 August 2026; Closing: 21 August 2026
- Website: SFF

Sarajevo Film Festival
- 33rd 31st

The 32nd Sarajevo Film Festival took place from 14 to 21 August 2026 in Sarajevo, Bosnia and Herzegovina. Bosnian actor Kerim Čutuna hosted the opening ceremony, and opened the festival with Nobel Prize-winning writer Thomas Mann's biographical film Fatherland, by Paweł Pawlikowski, presented by festival director Jovan Marjanović.

English actress Emily Watson served as jury president of the Competition Program - Feature Film, and received the Honorary Heart of Sarajevo Award on 15 August, which she dedicated to Katrin Cartlidge. Iranian film director and screenwriter Asghar Farhadi is the other recipient of Honorary Heart of Sarajevo Award while a retrospective of his films was presented as part of the "Tribute to" programme on 19 August. Actors Emir Hadžihafizbegović, Diego Luna and Woody Harrelson were also awarded the Honorary Heart Award.

The festival closed on 21 August 2026 with the screening of the Academy Award winning 2001 war film No Man's Land, a parable set in the midst of the Bosnian War, by Danis Tanović. The awards of the festival were presented at the National Theatre at the closing ceremony, where Everytime by Sandra Wollner won the Heart of Sarajevo award for best feature film.

== Festival overview ==
This section sums up the main things that took place during the festival:

- Prix Cineplexx Award

A new award is introduced in partnership with Cineplexx with this edition of the festival. It will be awarded to the best film in the Open Air Premiere program and is chosen by the festival audience. The award carries a total value of €20,000, split into 15,000 euros’ worth of Cineplexx marketing‑campaign services to boost the winning film’s theatrical release, plus 5,000 euros in cash given directly to the film’s producer.

- Films for Future

The film festival invited young people between the ages of 12 and 30 to participate in the "Films for Future" project, which promotes creative expression and raising awareness about environmental protection.

- Honorary Heart of Sarajevo Award:

Diego Luna was honored with the Honorary Heart of Sarajevo in recognition of his "outstanding career and indelible contribution to cinema" on 15 August 2026. Additionally the festival screened his 2026 drama film Ashes, and presented a masterclass.

Woody Harrelson was honored with the Honorary Heart of Sarajevo in recognition of his "outstanding contribution to the film industry and an exceptional acting career" on 18 August. The festival also screened his 1997 war drama film Welcome to Sarajevo.

- Masterclasses
  - Diego Luna – Mexican actor, director, and producer on 15 August
  - Pawel Pawlikowski – Polish filmmaker on 16 August
  - Rodrigo Sorogoyen – Spanish film director and screenwriter on 17 August
  - Woody Harrelson – American actor on 18 August
  - Emily Watson – English actress on 19 August
  - Asghar Farhadi – Iranian film director and screenwriter on 20 August
  - Céline Sciamma – French filmmaker on 21 August
- Opening ceremony

The opening ceremony was held with the red carpet laid down in the front of the Sarajevo National Theatre, hosted by Kerim Čutuna. Festival director Jovan Marjanović presented the opening film

== Jury ==
=== Competition Programme – Feature Film ===
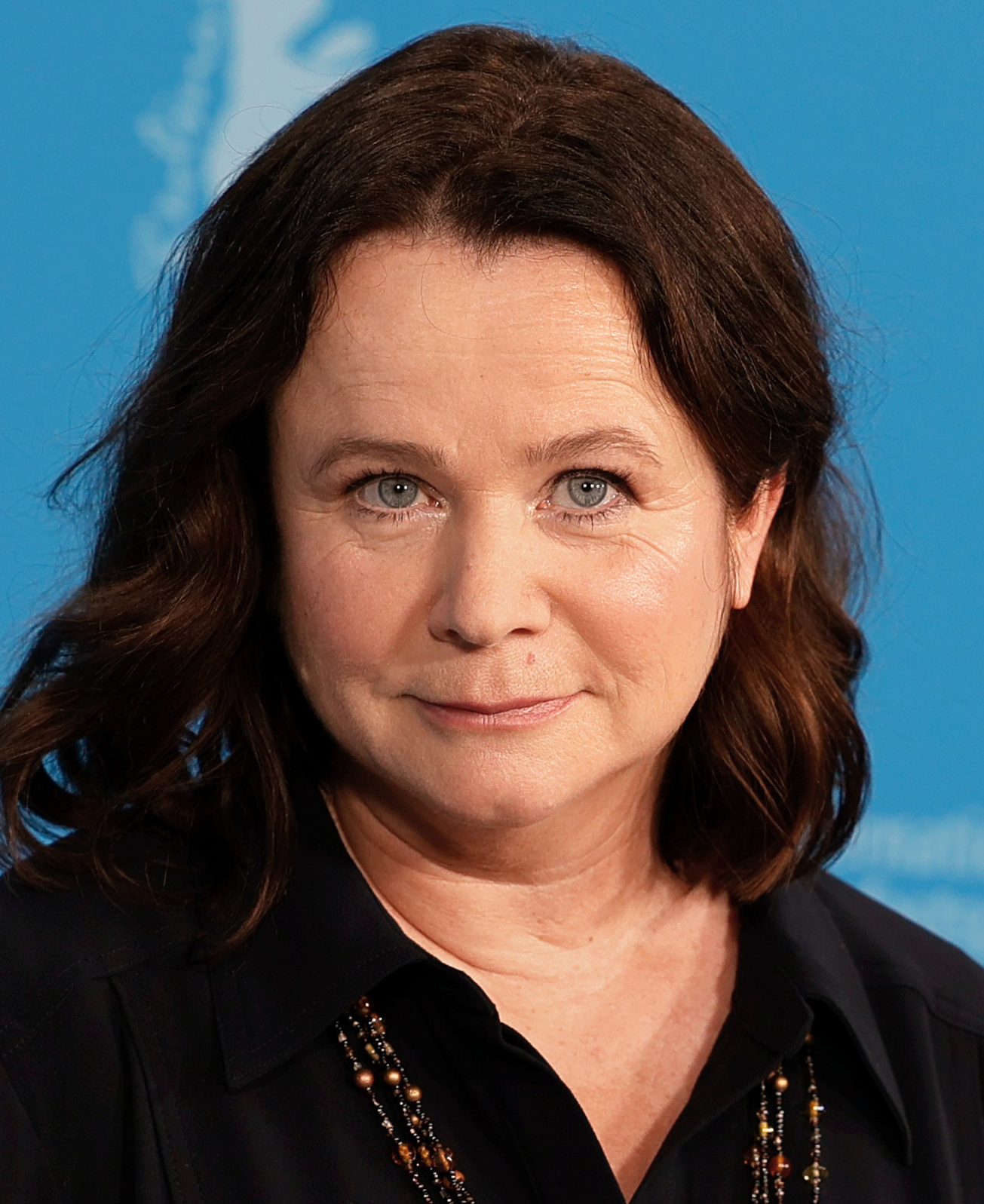
Emily Watson, jury president and recipient of the Honorary Heart of Sarajevo Award

The jury of the Competition Programme – Feature Film includes 4 members and a jury president.

- Emily Watson, English actress (Jury President)
- Igor Bezinović, Croatian film director
- Sara Klimoska, Macedonian actor, director, writer
- Matthijs Wouter Knol, Dutch film programme curator and producer, CEO and Director of the European Film Academy, Netherlands
- Athina Rachel Tsangari, Greek filmmaker, director, screenwriter and producer

=== Competition Program – Documentary Film ===
The jury of the Competition Program – Documentary Film are:

- Kamal Aljafari, Palestinian filmmaker and visual artist.
- Sabine Gebetsroither, Austrian cultural manager and co-managing director of the Crossing Europe Film Festival Linz
- Ollie Huddleston, British editor

=== CineLink Female Voices award ===
- Nataša Bučar, Managing Director of the Slovenian Film Center
- Una Gunjak, Director of the Slovenian Film Centre
- Radovan Sibrt, Czech producer, director, and co-founder of the independent production company PINK

=== Sarajevo Film Festival's Special Award for Gender Equality ===
- Niamh McCormack, Irish actress and model
- Michael Stütz, Head of the Panorama section and Co-Director of Film Programming at Berlinale, Austria
- Andrea Štaka, Swiss film director and screenwriter

== Official selection ==
=== Special Pre-festival, opening and closing films ===
in collaboration with the Slovenian Cinematheque, a screening of the restored version of the classic film Woman with a Landscape, by Ivica Matić was presented on 13 August.

The opening film is 2026 biographical film directed by Paweł Pawlikowski. The film stars Sandra Hüller and Hanns Zischler as Erika Mann and Thomas Mann, respectively.

English title	Original title	Director(s)	Production country
Special Pre-festival film
Woman with a Landscape (1976)	Žena s krajolikom	Ivica Matić	Yugoslavia
Opening film
Fatherland		Paweł Pawlikowski	Poland, France, Italy, Germany
Closing film
No Man's Land (4K Restoration of 2001 war film)	Ničija zemlja, Ничија земља	Danis Tanović	Bosnia and Herzegovina, France, Slovenia, United Kingdom, Belgium

=== Competition Programme - Feature Film ===
In the 'Competition Programme - Feature Film:, nine films competed.

English title	Original title	Director(s)	Production country
17 (Note: Nominated for Special Award for Promoting Gender Equality)		Kosara Mitić	North Macedonia, Serbia, Slovenia
Dua		Blerta Basholli	Kosovo, Switzerland, France
Everything that's Wrong with You	Vse, kar je narobe s tabo	Urša Menart	Slovenia, Germany, Serbia
Everytime		Sandra Wollner	Austria, Germany
Skateboarding Is Not for Girls	Скејтањето не е за девојчиња	Dina Duma	North Macedonia, Belgium, Slovenia, Croatia
Small Things	Male stvari	Zvonimir Jurić	Croatia, Slovenia, Serbia
Shame and Money	Wstyd i pieniądze	Visar Morina	Germany, Kosovo, Slovenia, Albania, North Macedonia, Belgium
Supporting Role	მეორეხარისხოვანი როლი	Ana Urushadze	Georgia, Estonia, Türkiye
You Don't Belong Here	Nu e locul tau aici	Florin Șerban	Romania

=== Competition programme - Documentary Film ===
There are 13 films in the Competition Programme – Documentary Film.

English title	Original title	Director(s)	Production countrie(s)
32 Meters		Morteza Atabaki	Türkiye, Iran, Qatar
Bear with Me		Martin Genovski	Bulgaria
The Balkan Cowboy		Dragana Jurišić	Croatia, Ireland
Bugboy		Lucas Paleocrassas	Greece, France, Denmark
Don't Ask Me If I Killed		Helena Maksyom	Romania, Netherlands, Germany, Ukraine
Electing Ms Santa		Raisa Răzmeriță	Moldova, Romania
The Forbidden Aunt		Bojana Novaković	Serbia, Australia
~~For Life~~	~~Ömür Boyu~~	~~Ahmet Seven~~	~~Türkiye~~
Fragments of Belonging		Tatjana Božić	Croatia, Netherlands, Germany
Good People	Добри луѓе	Milcho Manchevski	North Macedonia
To Hold a Mountain	Córki góry	Biljana Tutorov, Petar Glomazić	Serbia, France, Montenegro, Slovenia, Croatia
We Shall Live Together		Damir Markovina	Croatia, Bosnia and Herzegovina
When I Get Out	Ko pridem ven	Metod Pevec	Slovenia

=== Out of Competition ===
English title	Original title	Director(s)	Production country
Yugo Goes to America	Yugo ide u Ameriku	Filip Grujić, Aleksa Borković	Serbia, Croatia

=== Competition Programme - Short Film ===
Narrative Short Film 2026

In this category ten films competed for the award.

English title	Original title	Director(s)	Production countrie(s)
Adgwa-Ata		Zsuzsanna Krief	Hungary, France
Cosmonauts		Leo Černic	Slovenia, Italy
Ditch		Marianna Vas	Hungary
Go Outside and Hug a Tree		Irina Alexiu	Romania
Hidden in Frame		Anna Sarukhanova	Georgia, United Kingdom
Mamama		Danica Dakić	Bosnia and Herzegovina
Motherhood		Anca Damian	Romania, Belgium, France
Patch	Zakrpa	Luka Galešić	Croatia
Porkatal		Sis Gürdal	Turkey, France, United Kingdom
Nobody Said Anything	Niko nista nije rekao	Tamara Todorović	Serbia, France, Slovenia, Croatia

=== Competition Programme - Short Film ===
Documentary Short Films Competition

In this category eight films competed for the award.

English title	Original title	Director(s)	Production countrie(s)
Fahrudin		Alen Drljević	Bosnia and Herzegovina
Of Light Ghosts		Isabella Fellinger	Austria
Asparagus Bear		Ivan Grgur	Croatia
The Captain and the Caspian Sea		Turkan Huseyin	Azerbaijan
Holy Defiance		Karla Jelić	Croatia
The Ferry Flows	Паром пливе	Zhora Papoian	Ukraine, United Kingdom
Bro Ram		Branko Schmidt	Croatia
Dear Orchid		Hana Selena Sokolović	Bosnia and Herzegovina, Croatia, Serbia, Netherlands

=== Competition Programme - Student Short Film ===
There are 11 films in the Competition Programme - Student Film.

English title	Original title	Director(s)	Production countrie(s)
A. Wants Out (on Neutrality)		Zorah Berghammer	Austria
Rabbit Don't Run		Maximilian Conway, Elisabeth Jakob	Austria
Sisters		Sara Ećimović	Serbia
Over the Threshold		Tara Gajović	Serbia
Neighbour		Dan Grabnar	Serbia
Bonefuzz		Márk László	Hungary
Unwellness		Réka Pinczés	Hungary
Hyena		Fanny Rösch	Austria
The Future Is in Your Hands, but Why Not Lend It to the Specialists		Alexandra Schinteie	Romania
The Go-Between		Emir Solaković	Bosnia and Herzegovina
Water Walls		Bianka Szelestey	Hungary

=== In Focus ===
This section is selection of outstanding films that have already achieved success at prestigious film festivals:

English title	Original title	Director(s)	Production country
3 Days in September	3 zile în septembrie	Tudor Giurgiu	Romania
The Loneliest Man in Town	Wiener Blues – The Loneliest Man in Town	Tizza Covi and Rainer Frimmel	Austria
Mother	Мајка	Teona Strugar Mitevska	Belgium, North Macedonia, Denmark, Sweden, Bosnia and Herzegovina
Mouse		Kelly O'Sullivan and Alex Thompson	United States
Promised Spaces	Obećani prostori	Ivan Marković	France, Germany, Serbia, Cambodia
Rose		Markus Schleinzer	Austria, Germany
Titanic Ocean		Konstantina Kotzamani	Greece, Germany, Romania, France, Spain, Japan
Yellow Letters	Gelbe Briefe	İlker Çatak	Germany, France, Turkey

=== Open Air Programme ===
Open Air Program, consisting of two sections, Open Air and Open Air Premiere.

Open Air

The Open Air programme took place at the Festival's largest venue – the Coca-Cola Open Air Cinema.

English title	Original title	Director(s)	Production country
Ashes	Ceniza en la boca	Diego Luna	Mexico, Spain
The Beloved	El ser querido	Rodrigo Sorogoyen	Spain, France
Fatherland		Paweł Pawlikowski	Poland, France, Italy, Germany
Minotaur	Минотавр	Andrey Zvyagintsev	France, Latvia, Germany
No Good Men	Kabul Jan	Shahrbanoo Sadat	Germany, France, Norway, Denmark, Afghanistan
No Man's Land (4K Restoration closing film)	Ničija zemlja, Ничија земља	Danis Tanović	Bosnia and Herzegovina, France, Slovenia, United Kingdom, Belgium
Palestine 36		Annemarie Jacir	Palestine, United Kingdom, France, Denmark, Qatar, Saudi Arabia, Jordan
Welcome to Sarajevo		Michael Winterbottom	United Kingdom, United States

Open Air Premiere

The films are screened at UNIQA Open Air Cinema Stari Grad. The audience-selected Best Film in the programme were eligible for the Prix Cineplexx award.

English title	Original title	Director(s)	Production country
3 Weeks After	3 nedelje posle	Miroslav Terzić	Serbia, Bulgaria, Italy, Croatia, Luxembourg
Hidden People	Skriti Ljudje	Miha Hočevar	Slovenia, Serbia, Iceland
Home	Hjem	Marijana Janković	Denmark
Honey Bunny	Koke	Igor Jelinović	Croatia, Serbia
The Lost Son	Izgubljeni sin	Darko Štante	Slovenia, Greece, Croatia, Italy, North Macedonia
The Virus of Pathological Kindness	Virus patoloske dobrote	Predrag Ličina	Serbia, Croatia, Slovenia, Bosnia and Herzegovina
The Widower	Udovac	Hari Šečić	Bosnia and Herzegovina

=== Tribute to Programme ===
This program celebrates late Hungarian filmmaker Béla Tarr's contribution to world cinema.

English title	Original title	Director(s)	Production country
Lamb (2021)	Dýrið	Valdimar Jóhannsson	Iceland, Sweden, Poland
Motherhood (2022)	La Maternal	Pilar Palomero	Spain

=== Kinoscope ===
The Kinoscope programme features 18 films; 12 in the Kinoscope section and 6 in the Kinoscope Surreal section.

Cinemascope

English title	Original title	Director(s)	Production country
Blue Heron		Sophy Romvari	Canada, Hungary
Congo Boy		Rafiki Fariala	Central African Republic, France, Democratic Republic of the Congo, Italy
Coward		Lukas Dhont	Belgium, France, Netherlands
The Dreamed Adventure	Das Geträumte Abenteuer	Valeska Grisebach	Germany, France, Austria, Bulgaria
Filipiñana		Rafael Manuel	Singapore, United Kingdom, Philippines, France, Netherlands
Flies	Moscas	Fernando Eimbcke	Mexico
Heysel 85		Teodora Mihai	Belgium, Netherlands, Germany
In a Whisper	À voix basse	Leyla Bouzid	France, Tunisia
La Gradiva		Marine Atlan	France, Italy
Manhunt		Wayne Wapeemukwa	Canada
Object	Objet A	Ann Oren	Germany, Luxembourg, Greece
Silent Friend	Stille Freundin	Ildikó Enyedi	Germany, France, Hungary

Kinoscope Surreal

English title	Original title	Director(s)	Production country
Nightborn	Yön lapsi	Sophy Romvari	Finland, Lithuania, France, United Kingdom
Leviticus		Adrian Chiarella	Australia
Never After Dark	Nebâ Afutâ Dâku	Dave Boyle	Japan
Saccharine		Natalie Erika James	Australia
Teenage Sex and Death at Camp Miasma		Jane Schoenbrun	United States
Species	Sanguine	Marion Le Coroller	France, Belgium

=== Summer Screen Programme ===
This year's program brings six of the latest works by great world authors:

English title	Original title	Director(s)	Production country
All of a Sudden	Soudain	Ryusuke Hamaguchi	France, Japan, Germany, Belgium
Another Day	Garance	Jeanne Herry	France
The Birthday Party	Histoires de la Nuit	Léa Mysius	France
Fjord		Cristian Mungiu	Romania, Norway, Denmark, Finland, France, Sweden
Gentle Monster		Marie Kreutzer	Austria, France, Germany
Sheep in the Box	箱の中の羊	Hirokazu Kore-eda	Japan

=== Dealing with the Past ===
These films bring together not only different themes but also a wide range of aesthetic approache:

English title	Original title	Director(s)	Production country
Chronicles from the Siege	وقائع زمن الحصار	Abdallah Al-Khatib	Algeria, France, Palestine
The Doctor	Doktorica	Aleksandar Reljić	Serbia
Do You Love Me		Lana Daher	France, Lebanon, Germany, Qatar
Landscapes of Memory		Leah Galant	United States, Germany
The Match	El partido	Juan Cabral and Santiago Franco	Argentina
Peacemaker	Mirotvorac	Ivan Ramljak	Croatia

=== Special Screening Presents ===
The section features six films exploring the quest for identity, connection, and hope through the power of art, music, and family bonds in times of crisis.

English title	Original title	Director(s)	Production country
Antigone		Goran Gajić	United States

=== Midnight Screenings ===
The section was starred in 2026.

English title	Original title	Director(s)	Production country
No Fairy Dust	Pukotina u ledu	Maja Miloš	Serbia, Slovenia, Croatia, Italy, Netherlands, Montenegro

== Awards ==
=== Official awards ===
The following awards of the festival were presented on closing night at the National Theatre:

- Heart of Sarajevo for Best Feature Film: Everytime, Sandra Wollner
- Heart of Sarajevo Award for Best Director: Ana Urushadze for Supporting Role
- Heart of Sarajevo for Best Actor: Adrian Văncică for You Don't Belong Here
- Heart of Sarajevo for Best Actress: Eva Kostić for 17
- Heart of Sarajevo for Best Documentary Film: To Hold a Mountain, Biljana Tutorov, Petar Glomazić
- Heart of Sarajevo for Best Short Film: Nobody Said Anything, Tamara Todorović
- Special Mention: Porkatal, Sis Gürdal
- Heart of Sarajevo for Best Short Documentary Film: Holy Defiance, Karla Jelić
- Special Mention: The Ferry Flows, Zhora Papoian
- Heart of Sarajevo Award for Best Student Film: Unwellness, Réka Pinczés
- Special Award for Promoting Gender Equality: 17 by Kosara Mitic
- Special Mention: Don't Ask Me If I Killed, Helena Maksyom
- Special Youth Perspectives Award: Skateboarding Is Not for Girls, Dina Duma
- CineLink Female Voices award: Little Yugoslavia, Teona Strugar Mitevska, Sonja Prosenc

=== Partner's Awards ===
Partner's Awards for the festival:

- Awards of Association of Bosnian Filmmakers:

BH.Film Student Programme Award:
Besr BH. Student Film: Tape 2025: I Love You, Dad, Zoja Perović

- European Film Academy Short Film Candidate: The End, by Niki Lindroth von Bahr
- Cineuropa Prize: 17 by Kosara Mitic
- CICAE (International Confederation of Art Cinemas) Award: Everytime, Sandra Wollner
- UniCredit Audience Award: 17, Kosara Mitić
- The UniCredit Audience Award for Best Documentary Film: We Shall Live Together, Damir Markovina
- Prixx Cineplexx Audience Award: The Widower, Hari Šečić

=== Special awards ===
- Katrin Cartlidge Foundation Award: Lana Daher, Lebanese filmmaker

==== Honorary Heart of Sarajevo ====
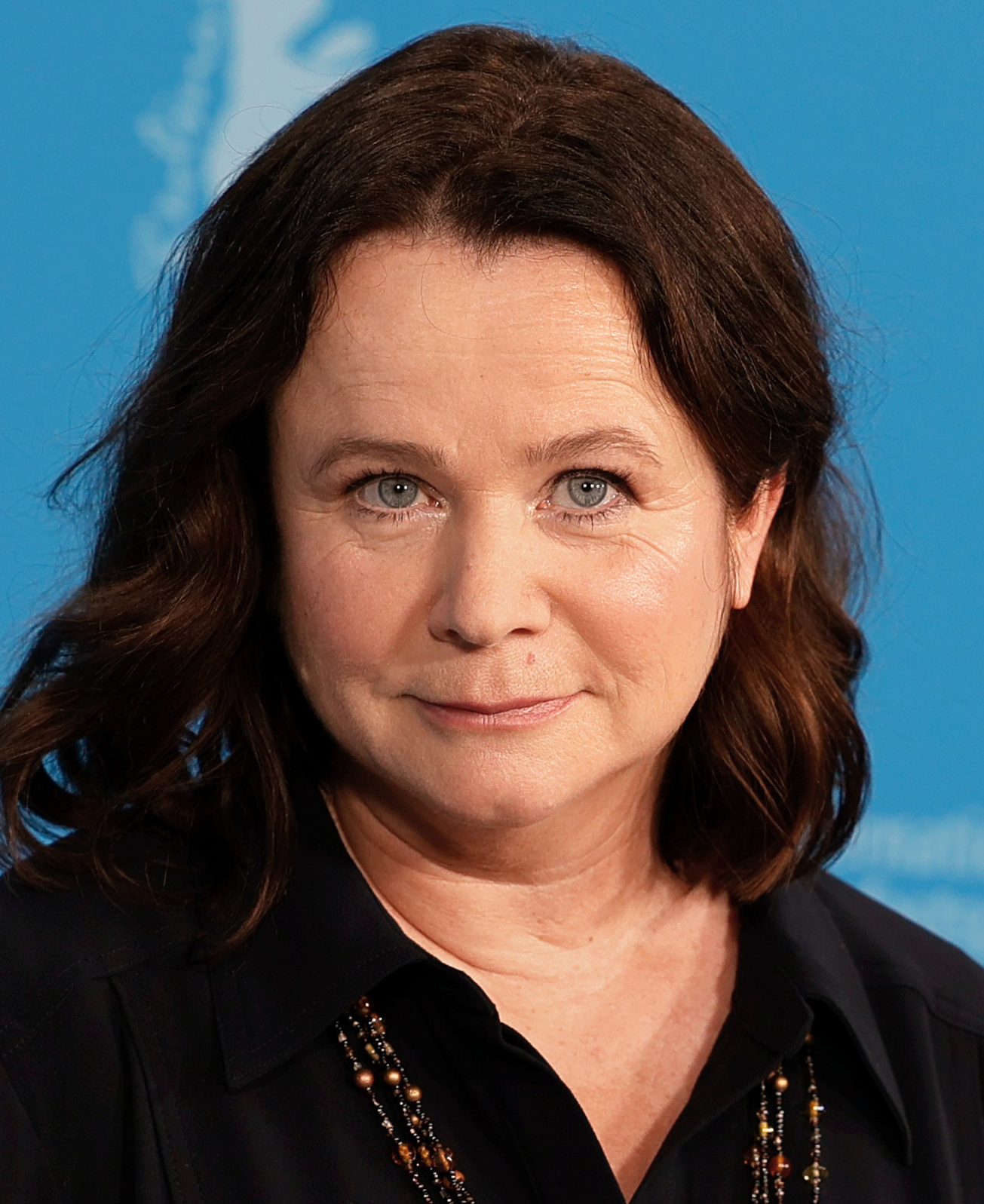
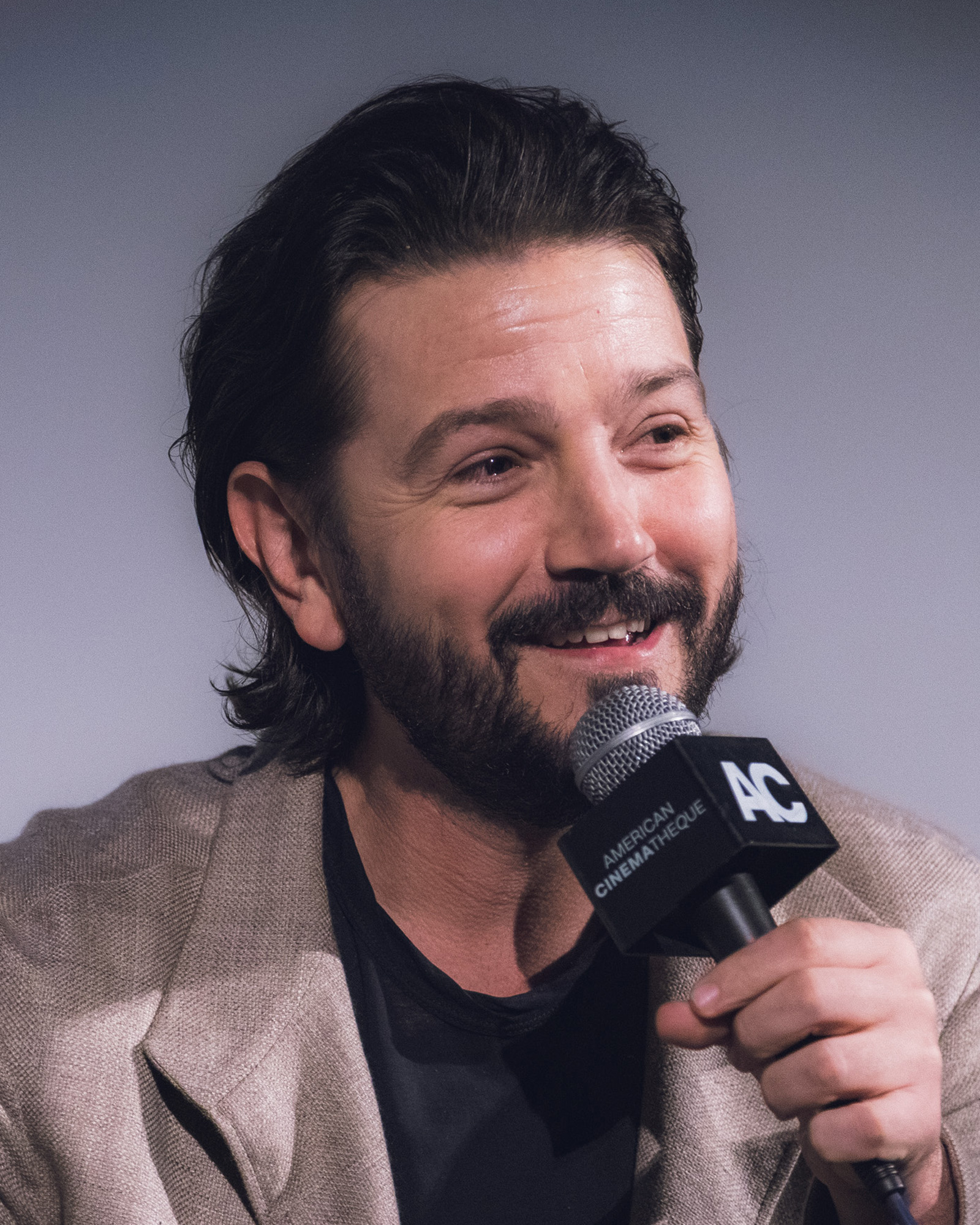
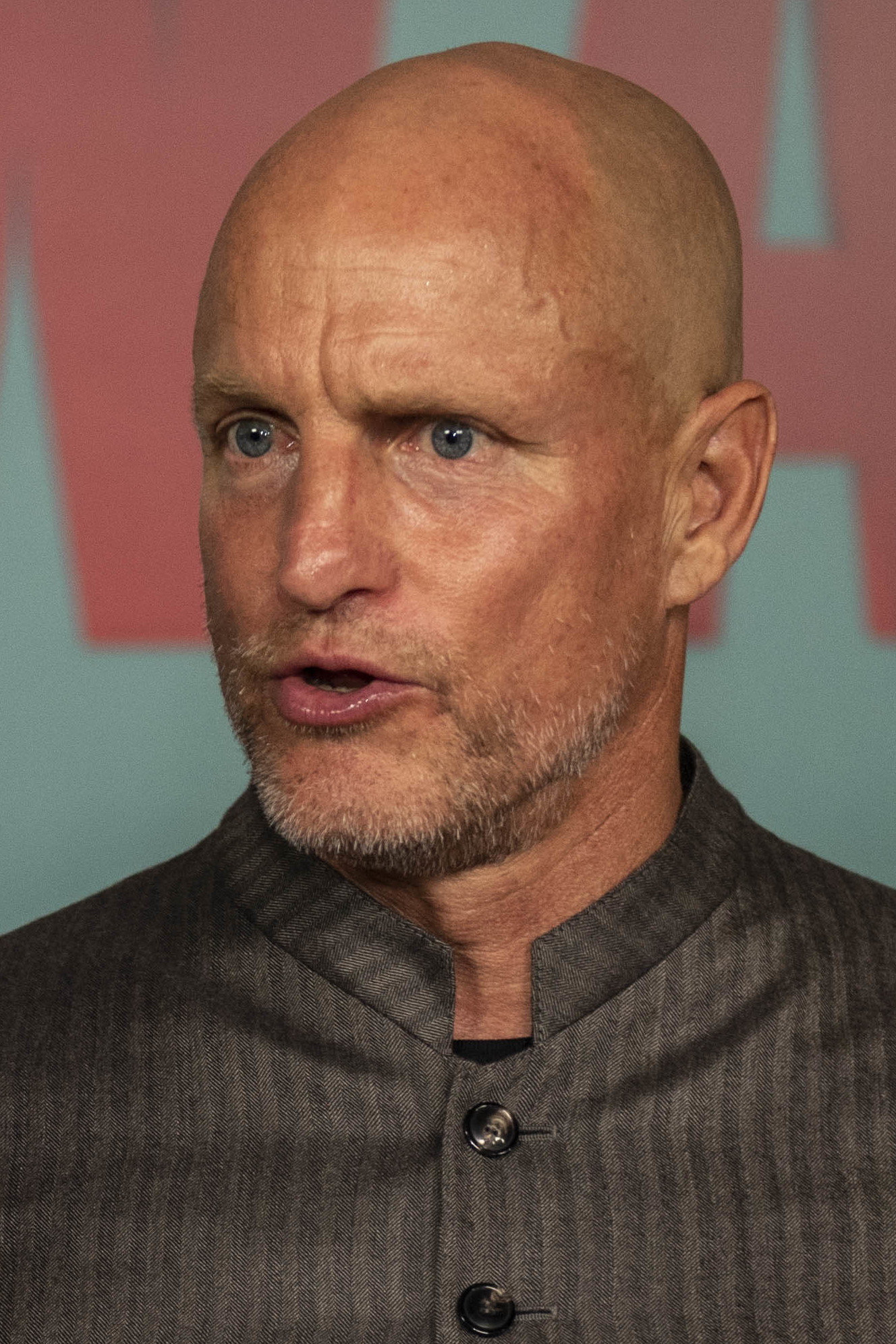
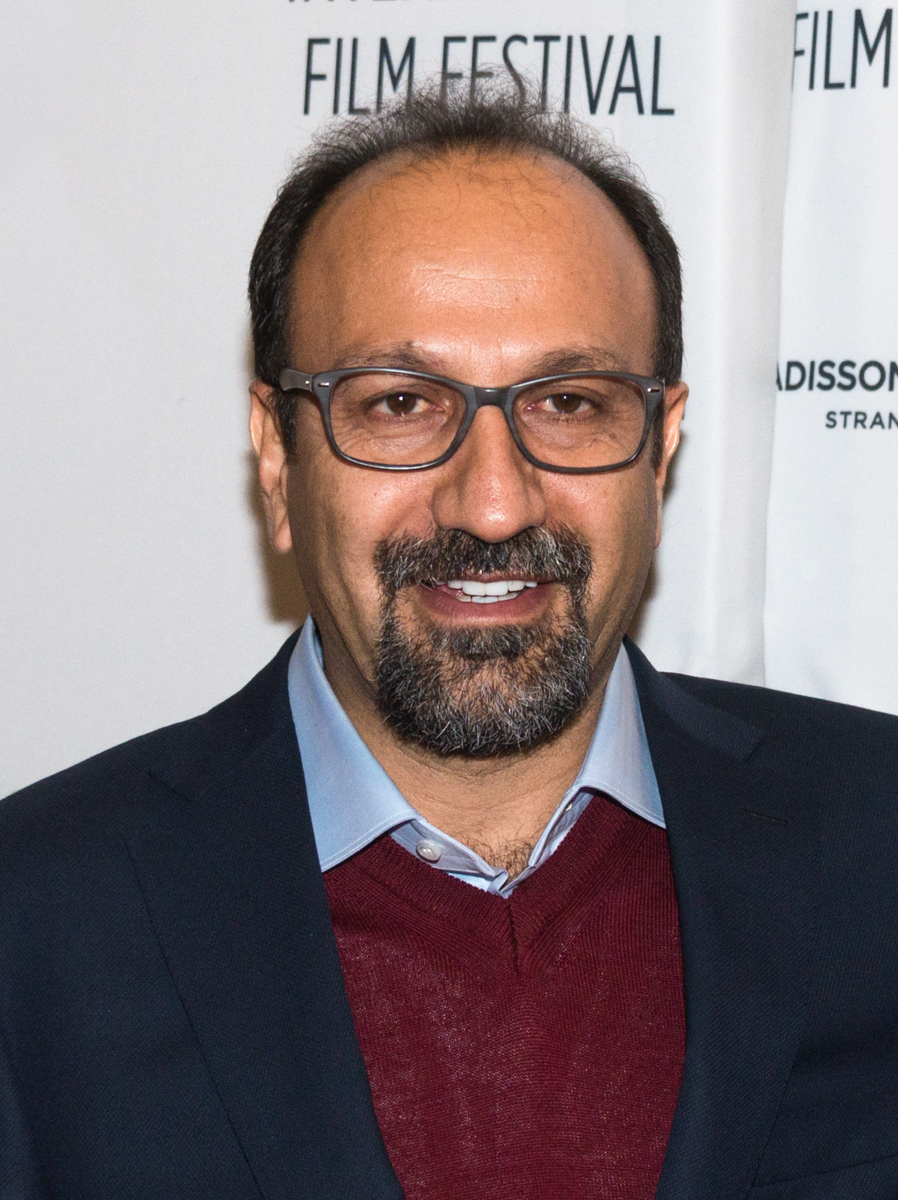
From L to R (first row): Emily Watson, Diego Luna
From L to R (second row): Woody Harrelson, Asghar Farhadi, the recipients of the Honorary Heart of Sarajevo Award
- Emily Watson, English actress
- Diego Luna, Mexican actor, director, and producer
- Woody Harrelson, American actor and playwright
- Asghar Farhadi, Iranian film director and screenwriter
- Emir Hadžihafizbegović, Bosnian actor
