= Labina Mitevska =

Macedonian actress

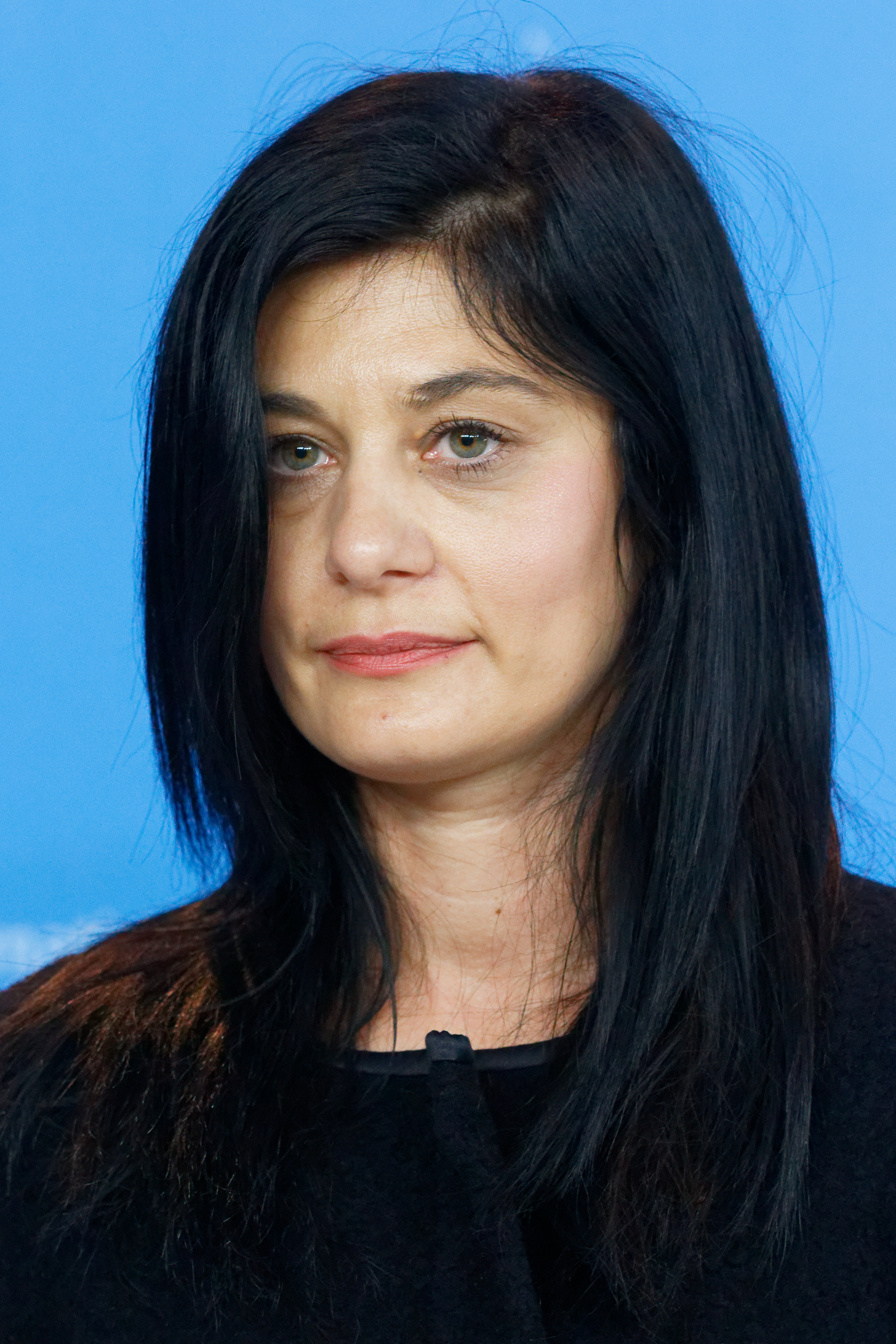
- Mitevska at the 2017 Berlin Film Festival
- Born: Labina Mitevska; October 11, 1975 (age 50); Skopje, SR Macedonia, SFR Yugoslavia (now North Macedonia)
- Occupations: Actress, manager
- Years active: 1994–present

Labina Mitevska (Macedonian: Лабина Митевска) (born 1975 in Skopje, Socialist Republic of Macedonia, Yugoslavia) is a Macedonian actress.

== Career ==
Mitevska began her acting career aged 19 after studying in Skopje, Denmark, and the University of Arizona. She starred in Milčo Mančevski's 1994 Oscar-nominated film Before the Rain.

Mitevska went on to play the supporting role in Welcome To Sarajevo, directed by Michael Winterbottom, and had the lead role in the Czech film Loners.

She also played the lead role in the 2006 film Warchild. She has two siblings, brother Vuk Mitevski and sister director Teona Strugar Mitevska, who directed her in the film God Exists, Her Name is Petrunija.

== Filmography ==
- Skateboarding Is Not for Girls (2026) as Natasha / Producer
- Mother (2025) as Sister Mercedes / Producer
- The Happiest Man in the World (2022) as Marta
- God Exists, Her Name Is Petrunija (2019)
- When the Day Had No Name (2017)
- The Prosecutor the Defender the Father and His Son (2015)
- The Woman Who Brushed Off Her Tears (2012)
- Footsteps in the Sand (2010)
- 9:06 (2009)
- 7 Avlu (2009) .... Selma
- Ofsajd (2009) .... Milena
- I Am from Titov Veles (2007) .... Afrodita
- Prevrteno (2007) .... Woman in White
- L... kot ljubezen (2007) .... Maya
- Investigation (2009) .... Family friend
- Warchild (2006) .... Senada
- Tajnata kniga (2006) .... Lydia
- Kontakt (2005) ..... Zana
- Nema problema (2004) .... Sanja K.
- Bubacki (2004)
- Kako ubiv svetec (2004) .... Viola
- Weg! (2002)
- Veta (2001)
- Loners (2000) .... Vesna
- Der braune Faden (2000) .... Kyana
- I Want You (1998) .... Smokey
- Welcome to Sarajevo (1997) .... Sonja
- Before the Rain (1994) .... Zamira
