= 39th European Film Awards =

2027 film awards ceremony in Greece

- Date: 16 January 2027
- Site: Greek National Opera, Kallithea, Greece
- Organized by: European Film Academy

Highlights
- Most nominations: Fatherland (11)

The 39th European Film Awards ceremony, presented by the European Film Academy (EFA), will take place on 16 January 2027 at the Greek National Opera inside the Stavros Niarchos Foundation Cultural Center, Kallithea.

== Background ==
On 8 January 2025, Athens was announced as the host city of the 39th European Film Awards, with the Stavros Niarchos Foundation Cultural Center standing as the venue for the ceremony. The EFA introduced the new 'Community Award for an Outstanding Contribution to European Film Culture' to be delivered on the eve of the main ceremony, during the Welcome Night gala dinner. It also announced Beki Probst, Marin Karmitz, and Sandra den Hamer as the first recipients.

The short film nominations will be read at the Seville European Film Festival on 13 November 2026 while the feature film nominations will be read a day later at the Thessaloniki International Film Festival. The European Film Academy Young Audience Award nominations will be announced on 1 November 2026 at the International Film Festival Glasgow and the nominees for the LUX Audience Award on 25 November 2026. In preparation for the event, the EFA launched the European Award Season 2027 with the collaboration of Europa Cinemas and CICAE, programming screenings, special events, curated programmes and retrospectives dedicated to European cinema across 150 cities.

== Selection ==
=== Feature film shortlist ===
The selection of feature films was announced on 14 October 2026.

==== Animation ====
- Decorado
- In Waves
- Iron Boy
- Jim Queen
- Julián
- Lucy Lost
- Monster Mia
- Viva Carmen

==== Documentary ====
- A Fox Under a Pink Moon
- Amazomania
- Bugboy
- Citizen Osama
- Closure
- Everybody to Kenmure Street
- La belle année
- Letters from the Silenced Country
- NAZA
- Queer Edward II
- Rehearsals for a Revolution
- Rescue
- To Hold a Mountain
- Traces
- Whispers in the Woods

==== Fiction ====
- A Day in the Life of Jo: Chapter Phaedra
- A Man of His Time
- Bitter Christmas
- Black Money for White Nights
- Brace Your Heart
- Bucking Fastard
- Bunker
- Conversation with the Sea
- Coward
- Dau
- De Gaulle: Liberté / De Gaulle: Resistance
- Diane in the Loop
- Dua
- Elsinore
- Everytime
- Fatherland
- Fjord
- Gentle Monster
- Growth of the Soil
- Hold Onto Me
- How to Divorce During the War
- I Matter
- I See Buildings Fall Like Lightning
- Iván & Hadoum
- La bola negra
- La Gradiva
- Minotaur
- Only Beautiful Things to Look At
- Red Rocks
- Rose
- Salvation
- Shame and Money
- Supporting Role
- Tender Loving Care
- The Beloved
- The Diary of a Chambermaid
- The Dreamed Adventure
- The Guest
- The Soundman
- The Spiral
- To the Victory!
- Truly Naked
- Woman Unknown
- Yellow Letters
- You Don't Belong Here

== Nominations ==
The nominees in the category of "European Short Film" were announced on 13 November 2026 at the Seville European Film Festival. The bulk of nominations were read at the Thessaloniki International Film Festival on 14 November 2026.

European Film: Fatherland – directed by Paweł Pawlikowski, produced by Mario Gianani, Ewa Puszczyńska, Jeanne Tremsal, Lorenzo Mieli, Edward Berger, Dimitri Rassam, Lorenzo Gangarossa; Fjord – directed and produced by Cristian Mungiu; La bola negra – directed and produced by Javier Calvo, Javier Ambrossi; La Gradiva – directed by Marine Atlan, produced by Inès Daïen Dasi; Woman Unknown – directed by May el-Toukhy, produced by Mikael Rieks
European Director: Javier Calvo, Javier Ambrossi – La bola negra; Cristian Mungiu – Fjord; Paweł Pawlikowski – Fatherland; Sandra Wollner – Everytime; Andrey Zvyagintsev – Minotaur	European Screenwriter: Javier Calvo, Javier Ambrossi, Alberto Conejero – La bola negra; Cristian Mungiu – Fjord; Paweł Pawlikowski, Henk Handloegten – Fatherland; Sandra Wollner – Everytime; Simon Lyashenko, Andrey Zvyagintsev – Minotaur
European Actress: Mathilde Arcel – Woman Unknown; Penélope Cruz – Bunker; Sandra Hüller – Fatherland; Sandra Hüller – Rose; Renate Reinsve – Fjord; Léa Seydoux – Gentle Monster	European Actor: Swann Arlaud – A Man of His Time; Javier Bardem – The Beloved; Andrew Scott – Elsinore; Sebastian Stan – Fjord; Hanns Zischler – Fatherland
Crafts & Arts Categories
European Casting Director: Nina Haun, Magdalena Szwarcbart, Karen Lindsay Stewart – Fatherland; Eva Leira, Yolanda Serrano – La bola negra; Jessica Ronane – Elsinore	European Cinematographer: Gris Jordana – La bola negra; Frank van den Eeden – Coward; Łukasz Żal – Fatherland
European Composer: Volker Bertelmann – Bunker; Tara Nome Doyle – Rose; Alberto Iglesias – Bitter Christmas	European Costume Designer: Doris Bartelt – Rose; Ana López Cobos – La bola negra; Rebecca Richmond, Jūlija Volkinšteine – Woman Unknown
European Editor: Alberto Gutiérrez – La bola negra; Gesa Jäger – Yellow Letters; Paweł Pawlikowski, Piotr Wójcik – Fatherland	European Make-Up & Hair Artist: Pablo Morillas, Mariló Osuna – La bola negra; Evalotte Oosterop, Pierre-Olivier Persin – Coward; Waldemar Pokromski – Fatherland
European Production Designer: Roger Bellés – La bola negra; Olivier Meidinger – Rose; Katarzyna Sobańska, Marcel Sławiński – Fatherland	European Sound: Robert Farr, Lars Ginzel, Benjamin Hörbe – NAZA; Lars Ginzel, Tarn Willers – Fatherland; Rodrigo Madrigal, Anna Harrington, Alejandro López, Mayte Cazorla – La bola negra
Animation & Documentary (entries automatically eligible for the European Film category)
European Animated Film: In Waves; Iron Boy; Jim Queen; Lucy Lost; Viva Carmen	European Documentary: Letters from the Silenced Country; NAZA; Rehearsals for a Revolution; To Hold a Mountain; Whispers in the Woods
Short Films and Debuts
European Discovery – Prix FIPRESCI: Kosara Mitić – 17 (North Macedonia, Serbia, Slovenia); Beatrice Gibson – At Night (United Kingdom); Marlene Emilie Lyngstad – Cute (Denmark, Norway); Pierre Le Gall – Flesh and Fuel (France, Poland); Mads Mengel – The Guest (Denmark); Hosam Abu Dan – Thirteen in Gaza (Palestine, Qatar)	European Short Film – Prix Vimeo: God Is Shy – Jocelyn Charles (France); L'Mina – Randa Maroufi (France, Morocco, Italy, Qatar, United Arab Emirates); Morning Circle – Basma al-Sharif (Germany, Canada, United Arab Emirates); The End – Niki Lindroth von Bahr (Sweden, France, Denmark); Unleaded 95 – Emma Hütt and Tina Muffler (Germany, Austria)

=== Films with multiple nominations ===
Nominations	Film
11	Fatherland
10	La bola negra
5	Fjord
4	Rose
3	Woman Unknown
2	Everytime
2	Minotaur
2	Coward
2	Bunker
2	Elsinore
2	NAZA

=== Honorary Awards ===
Announced recipients of honorary awards include:

European Lifetime Achievement Jean-Pierre Dardenne and Luc Dardenne	European Achievement in World Cinema Hiam Abbass	Eurimages International Co-Production Award TBA

=== Special Awards ===
The nominees for European Young Audience Award were revealed on 1 November 2026 at a ceremony at the Grosvenor Picture Theatre in Glasgow during International Film Festival Glasgow.

LUX Audience Award	European Young Audience Award: Hold onto Me – Myrsini Aristidou (Cyprus, Greece, Denmark); I Matter – Alina Șerban (Romania, Germany, Belgium); Iron Boy – Louis Clichy (France, Belgium)
