= Balkan Documentary Center =

Bulgarian cinema organization

The Balkan Documentary Center (BDC) is a Bulgarian organization founded in 2010 that supports the development of documentary cinema and independent journalism in the Balkan region. The center operates both as a physical space located in a historic building in downtown Sofia and as a virtual network and platform for professionals in the documentary and media sectors. BDC is recognized by both creators and funding institutions as an innovative structure that builds a bridge between the Balkan region and the international film and journalism communities. The organization provides training, expert support, and opportunities for collaboration, encouraging bold storytelling and the development of new voices in the public sphere. Its activities include the training programs BDC Discoveries, Docu Rough Cut Boutique (in collaboration with Sarajevo Film Festival), Balkan Watchers (for journalistic projects), as well as the festival Sofia DocuMental.

== History and mission ==
The Balkan Documentary Center was established in 2010 with the goal of fostering documentary filmmaking and investigative journalism in Southeast Europe. It provides resources and training aimed at enhancing cross-border cooperation and international exposure for Balkan documentary projects.

== Programs and initiatives ==
=== BDC Discoveries ===
BDC Discoveries is an ongoing training program for documentary professionals from the Balkans or those working on Balkan-related topics. Held in three modules — Belgrade, Sofia, and Leipzig — in partnership with the Beldocs and DOK Leipzig festivals, the program supports projects in development with international potential and a cross-media focus. Seven teams consisting of a producer and a writer or director are selected, with exceptions for directors without producers. Observers from civil society, broadcasters, and funding organizations participate. The program covers countries including Albania, Bosnia and Herzegovina, Bulgaria, Croatia, Cyprus, Greece, Hungary, Kosovo, North Macedonia, Moldova, Montenegro, Romania, Serbia, Slovenia, Turkey, and since 2022, Ukraine.

=== Docu Rough Cut Boutique ===
Docu Rough Cut Boutique is a premier regional program for documentaries in post-production, created in collaboration with the Sarajevo Film Festival. Featuring only five selected projects from Southeast Europe and the Caucasus, the program takes place in Sofia, Cluj, and Sarajevo. It includes editing tutorials, group sessions, and individual meetings with documentary experts. Projects are presented at the CineLink Industry Days during the Sarajevo Film Festival, with the aim of supporting film completion and distribution.

=== Balkan Watchers – media programme for journalists ===
Balkan Watchers is a program supporting investigative and independent journalism in the Balkans, Central Europe, the Eastern Partnership countries, Cyprus, and Malta. It addresses challenges like self-censorship, threats, and legal pressure faced by journalists in the region. The program offers training and funds six projects — three documentaries and three podcasts — to promote accountability, transparency, and freedom of speech through international cooperation. It is supported by Creative Europe MEDIA.
