= The Widower (2026 film) =

2026 Bosnian drama film

- Promotional poster
- Bosnian: Udovac
- Directed by: Hari Šečić
- Screenplay by: Hari Šečić
- Produced by: Hari Šečić; Kerim Mašović
- Starring: Izudin Bajrović; Faketa Salihbegovic; Lana Stanišić
- Cinematography: Amel Djikoli
- Edited by: Hari Šečić
- Music by: Hamza Ražnatović
- Production company: Spektar
- Release date: 16 August 2026 (Sarajevo)
- Running time: 102 minutes
- Countries: Bosnia and Herzegovina
- Language: Bosnian

The Widower (Bosnian: Udovac) is a 2026 Bosnian drama film written, co-produced and directed by Hari Šečić in his feature debut. It stars Izudin Bajrović as Mirsad, a 62-year-old widower, who, following the sudden death of his wife, begins to reassess his long-held patriarchal beliefs.

The film premiered in the Open Air Premiere section of the 32nd Sarajevo Film Festival on 15 August 2026, where it won the Prix Cineplexx Award. It was also selected as the Bosnia and Herzegovina entry for the Best International Feature Film at the 99th Academy Awards.

== Synopsis ==
Mirsad, a 62-year-old electrician, lives in a traditional patriarchal society. After the sudden death of his wife, Enisa, he is left alone as their grown-up children pursue separate lives. He gradually realises that he had taken his wife for granted and failed to give her the love and care she deserved. His relationship with his estranged son deteriorates after he discovers that the son lives with a male friend. Meanwhile, Mirsad's best friend encourages him to remarry. As he comes to terms with his past, Mirsad discovers that his daughter is living a life similar to her mother's.

== Cast ==
- Izudin Bajrović as Mirsad
- Faketa Salihbegovic
- Lana Stanišić
- Nermin Omić
- Edin Koja Avdagić
- Gordana Boban
- Emina Muftić
- Dino Bajrović
- Emir Fejzić
- Mediha Musliović
- Alija Aljović
- Damir Kustura
- Emina Macić
- Ata Bećiragić

== Production ==
The film is made by the Association for Arts, Culture and Sports Spektar, and the producers are Hari Šečić and Kerim Mašović. It received the support from the Cinematography Foundation and the Ministry of Culture and Sports of Sarajevo Canton. Principal photography began on 18 June 2024 in Sarajevo.

== Release ==
The Widower had its premiere at the 32nd Sarajevo Film Festival on 15 August 2026, screening in the Open Air Premiere and winning the Prix Cineplexx Award.

It was selected as the Bosnia and Herzegovina entry for the Best International Feature Film at the 99th Academy Awards, marking Šečić first film selected to represent the country.

The film is scheduled for release in late October or early November 2026, after 2026 Bosnian general election are over.

== Reception ==
=== Accolades ===
Award	Date of ceremony	Category	Recipient	Result	Ref.
Sarajevo Film Festival	21 August 2026	Prixx Cineplexx Audience Award	The Widower	Won	

== See also ==
- List of submissions to the 99th Academy Awards for Best International Feature Film
- List of Bosnian submissions for the Academy Award for Best International Feature Film
