= Nobody Said Anything (film) =

2026 Serbian short film

- International poster
- Serbian: Niko ništa nije rekao
- Directed by: Tamara Todorović
- Written by: Tamara Todorović
- Produced by: Čarna Vučinić; Ena Bajraktarević; Jasmina Sijerčić; Katja Lenarčić; Tena Gojić
- Starring: Ivana Vuković; Milica Stefanović; Iva Kraljević; Kalina Šutić; Viktorija Vasiljević; Jovan Belobrković
- Cinematography: Mladen Teofilović
- Edited by: Kristina Todorović
- Production companies: NAKED; Bocalupo Films; Manjana; Dinaridi Film
- Release date: 20 May 2026 (Cannes)
- Running time: 15 minutes
- Countries: Serbia; France; Slovenia; Croatia
- Language: Serbian

Nobody Said Anything (Serbian: Niko ništa nije rekao) is a 2026 short film written and directed by Tamara Todorović. A co-production between Serbia, France, Slovenia, and Croatia, it stars Ivana Vuković, Milica Stefanović, Iva Kraljević, and Viktorija Vasiljević.

The film had its world premiere in Short Films Competition at the 2026 Cannes Film Festival on 20 May 2026, where it competed for the Short Film Palme d'Or. It had its regional premiere at the Narrative Short Film Competition of the 32nd Sarajevo Film Festival on 18 August 2026, where it won the Heart of Sarajevo for Best Short Film award.

== Synopsis ==
Katarina, a mother whose 11-year-old daughter and her friends violently killed a cat, tries to talk with the other mothers to understand what happened, who is responsible, and what they should do next. The discussion becomes heated and turns into a physical fight in front of the girls. Shocked and ashamed by how angry she became, Katarina goes back home, scared of her own reaction and struggling to face what comes next.

== Cast ==
- Ivana Vuković as Katarina
- Milica Stefanović as Sara
- Iva Kraljević as Jasmina
- Kalina Šutić as Mina
- Viktorija Vasiljević as Milica
- Jovan Belobrkovic as Miloš
- Marta Grujić as Jana
- Jelena Popović as Bojana
- Petar Požega as Jovan

== Production ==
The film was developed through the European Short Pitch program in 2025 and was supported by Film Center Serbia, the City of Kragujevac, the French CNC and Arte, the Slovenian Film Centre and the Croatian Audiovisual Centre.

== Release ==
Nobody Said Anything had its world premiere at the 79th Cannes Film Festival, where it was nominated for the Short Film Palme d'Or Competition.

It also competed for the Heart of Sarajevo award in the Competition programme - Short Film at the 32nd Sarajevo Film Festival on 18 August 2026.

== Accolades ==
The film was shortlisted for a nomination at the 39th European Film Awards in the Short Film category.

Award	Date of ceremony	Category	Recipient	Result	Ref.
Cannes Film Festival	23 May 2026	Short Film Palme d'Or	Nobody Said Anything	Nominated	
Sarajevo Film Festival	21 August 2026	Heart of Sarajevo for Best Short Film	Nobody Said Anything	Won	
