= Everytime (film) =

2026 drama film by Sandra Wollner

- German promotional poster
- Directed by: Sandra Wollner
- Written by: Sandra Wollner
- Produced by: Lixi Frank; Viktoria Stolpe; David Bohun; Sandra Wollner
- Starring: Birgit Minichmayr; Tristán López; Lotte Shirin Keiling; Carla Hüttermann
- Cinematography: Gregory Oke
- Edited by: Hannes Bruun
- Music by: David Schweighart
- Production companies: Charades; Panama Film; The Barricades; ZDF
- Distributed by: eksystent distribution (Germany); Stadtkino Filmverleih (Austria)
- Release dates: 18 May 2026 (Cannes); 16 August 2026 (Germany); 27 November 2026 (Austria)
- Running time: 121 minutes
- Countries: Austria; Germany
- Languages: German; Spanish
- Budget: €5.5million

Everytime is a 2026 psychological drama film written and directed by Sandra Wollner. It stars Birgit Minichmayr, Tristán López, Lotte Shirin Keiling, and Carla Hüttermann, it follows a small family holiday trip in Tenerife.

The film had its world premiere in the Un Certain Regard section of the 2026 Cannes Film Festival on 18 May, where it won the section's top prize. It was theatrically released in Germany on 6 August, and will be released in Austria on 27 November.

It was also selected as the German entry for Best International Feature Film at the 99th Academy Awards.

== Premise ==
A tragedy brings a mother, daughter, and teenage boy together. Struggling with blame and forgiveness, the unlikely trio take a trip to Tenerife, Spain, for a family holiday that never happened. Under the glow of the sun, past and present quietly start to overlap.

== Cast ==
- Birgit Minichmayr as Ella
- Tristán López as Lux
- Lotte Shirin Keiling as Melli
- Carla Hüttermann as Jessie

== Production ==
Everytime is an international co-production of Austria and Germany, produced by Lixi Frank and David Bohun for Vienna-based Panama Film, alongside Viktoria Stolpe and Wollner for Germany’s The Barricades. The project was supported by Eurimages, Österreichisches Filminstitut, Filmfonds Wien, the German Federal Government Commissioner for Culture and the Media (BKM), Medienboard Berlin-Brandenburg and the German Federal Film Fund, with participation from broadcasters ORF and ZDF.

In December 2022, the project was selected to participate at the Co-Production Village section of the Les Arcs Film Festival. In November 2023, it received a €380,000 production grant from Eurimages. In January 2026, it was presented at the When East Meets West co-production forum, held during the Trieste Film Festival. It won the M74 Award.

Principal photography took place in Vienna, Berlin, and Tenerife for thirty-six days from August to October 2024. British cinematographer Gregory Oke was the director of photography, the score was composed by David Schweighart and editing was handled by Hannes Bruun.

== Release ==
Everytime had its world premiere at the 2026 Cannes Film Festival at the Un Certain Regard section, where it won the section's top prize. Prior to its premiere, the film's international sales was acquired by Charades. In July 2026 the film was part of Horizons section of the 60th Karlovy Vary International Film Festival, where it was screened from 5 July to 11 July 2026, and also competed in the New Horizons International Competition for Grand Prix at the New Horizons Film Festival.

The film was released in German cinemas by eksystent distribution on 6 August 2026. Continuing on the international festival circuit, the film was screened at the 32nd Sarajevo Film Festival on 17 August 2026, where it won the Heart of Sarajevo award in the Competition Programme - Feature Film. In October 2026, it was screened at the 70th London Film Festival, before entering the 'Official Section' competition of the 71st Valladolid International Film Festival, where it won the 'Miguel Delibes' Award for Best Screenplay, and then being premiered in the "Alice nella città" section of the 21st Rome Film Festival, where it won the Best Film Award. 1-2 Special acquired distribution rights to the film for the territory of North America. It had its U.S. premiere in the Main Slate of the 2026 New York Film Festival. In Austria, the film is scheduled to hit theaters by Stadtkino Filmverleih on 27 November.

== Reception ==
=== Critical response ===
On review aggregator Rotten Tomatoes, the film holds an approval rating of 96% based on 27 reviews, with an average rating of 8.7/10. On Metacritic, the film has a weighted average score of 91 out of 100, based on 11 critics, indicating "universal acclaim".

=== Accolades ===
Award / Festival	Date of ceremony	Category	Recipient(s)	Result	Ref.
Cannes Film Festival	22 May 2026	Un Certain Regard Award	Everytime	Won	
Sarajevo Film Festival	21 August 2026	Heart of Sarajevo	Everytime	Won	
Film Fest Gent	17 October 2026	Explore Award	Everytime	Won	
Chicago International Film Festival	23 October 2026	Silver Hugo	Everytime	Won	
Chicago International Film Festival	23 October 2026	Best Supporting Performance	Lotte Shirin Keiling	Won	
Rome Film Festival	24 October 2026	Best Film Award	Everytime	Won	
Valladolid International Film Festival	31 October 2026	'Miguel Delibes' Award for Best Screenplay	Sandra Wollner	Won	
Gotham Independent Film Awards	30 November 2026	Best International Feature	Sandra Wollner, David Bohun, Lixi Frank, Viktoria Stolpe	Pending	
Gotham Independent Film Awards	30 November 2026	Best Director	Sandra Wollner	Pending	
Gotham Independent Film Awards	30 November 2026	Best Original Screenplay	Sandra Wollner	Pending	
European Film Awards	16 January 2027	European Director	Sandra Wollner	Pending	
European Film Awards	16 January 2027	European Screenwriter	Sandra Wollner	Pending	

== See also ==
- List of submissions to the 99th Academy Awards for Best International Feature Film
- List of German submissions for the Academy Award for Best International Feature Film
