= Yugo Goes to America =

2026 documentary film

- International poster
- Serbian: Yugo ide u Ameriku
- Directed by: Filip Grujić; Aleksa Borković
- Written by: Filip Grujić
- Produced by: Čarna Vučinić; Vanja Jambrović
- Cinematography: Aleksa Borković
- Edited by: Kristina Todorović
- Music by: Boško Mijušković
- Production companies: NAKED; Restart
- Distributed by: Films Mundi; Art Vista
- Release date: 18 March 2026; (CPH:DOX)
- Running time: 87 minutes
- Countries: Serbia; Croatia
- Languages: Serbian; English

Yugo Goes to America (Serbian: Yugo ide u Ameriku) is a 2026 Serbian-Croatian documentary film directed by Filip Grujić and Aleksa Borković, in their feature directorial debut. The film follows a group of childhood friends from Belgrade as they drive a Yugo, the Yugoslav-built car once dubbed "the worst car in the history of America", on a road trip from New York to Los Angeles, retracing and reflecting on the car's failed 1980s launch in the United States. The film's world premiere took place at CPH:DOX on 18 March 2026.

== Synopsis ==
Four millennials born in the 1990s in socialist Yugoslavia set off on a road trip across the United States in a Yugo, an old Yugoslav car once labeled "the worst car in the history of the USA." Traveling through 24 states from New York to Los Angeles, they search for an answer to the question: what does it mean to be the worst? Along the way, they meet people who were involved in importing the Yugo in the 1980s, present-day Yugo enthusiasts, Americans, and emigrants from post-Yugoslav countries. They also come face to face with their own personal history and the ways in which it is inseparable from the Yugo.

== Production ==
The film received support from Eurimages, Film Center Serbia and the Croatian Audiovisual Centre. It was produced by Čarna Vučinić through the Serbian company NAKED, in co-production with Croatia's Restart and Serbia's United Media. The shooting took place in the United States and in Serbia. Filip Grujić, a novelist and playwright, wrote and co-directed the film, while Aleksa Borković, a cinematographer and director known for music videos and short films, served as co-director and director of photography. The project was pitched at industry events including Fipadoc's international pitching forum in Biarritz, winning the event's top award.

== Release ==
Yugo Goes to America had its world premiere on 18 March 2026, in the Special Premieres section of the 23rd CPH:DOX International Documentary Film Festival in Copenhagen. It went on to open the 19th Beldocs International Documentary Film Festival in Belgrade in May 2026, where it won the Audience Award and received a special mention in the Teen Selection. The film was subsequently screened at other festivals, including Kino Otok-Isola Cinema, DokuFest, the Pula Film Festival and the Liburnia Film Festival. The film screened out of competition at the 32nd Sarajevo Film Festival.

Yugo Goes to America received a theatrical release in Croatian cinemas beginning 17 August 2026 and will open in Serbian cinemas on 3 September 2026.

== Reception ==
Yugo Goes to America has been described by critics as a warm, humorous docu-comedy road movie, with praise for its blend of personal storytelling with the historical narrative of the Yugo's rise and fall in the American market. Documentary filmmaker John Wilson said about the film: "Great Movie. Real fun ride. Just like playing musical chairs, not knowing when it will breakdown next."

Reviewing the film for Cineuropa, critic Marko Stojiljković wrote favorably of the film's collection of stories about America, migration, and life in overlooked corners of the country, noting its use of Grujić's reflective voice-over narration and its soundtrack drawing on music from the former Yugoslavia, and concluded that the film ultimately transcends being simply a film about a car, but a movie "about adventure, dreams, friendship (...), therefore about life itself."

A review published by the International Cinephile Society (ICS) praised the film as an unexpectedly moving and "wonderfully offbeat movie that blends humor and heartfulness", highlighting how it uses the Yugo as a lens onto both former Yugoslav and American cultural mythology rather than treating the car as its sole subject.

The entertainment site Movies We Texted About wrote that the film functions as a retrospective of the Yugo's trajectory as much as a portrait of the friendship between its three protagonists, noting that the film "is a time capsule to the 1980s, back when Yugoslavia existed."

== Accolades ==
Festival	Award	Recipient	Result
19th Beldocs	Audience Award	Yugo Goes to America	Won
