= DocuDays UA =

Human rights documentary film festival in Ukraine

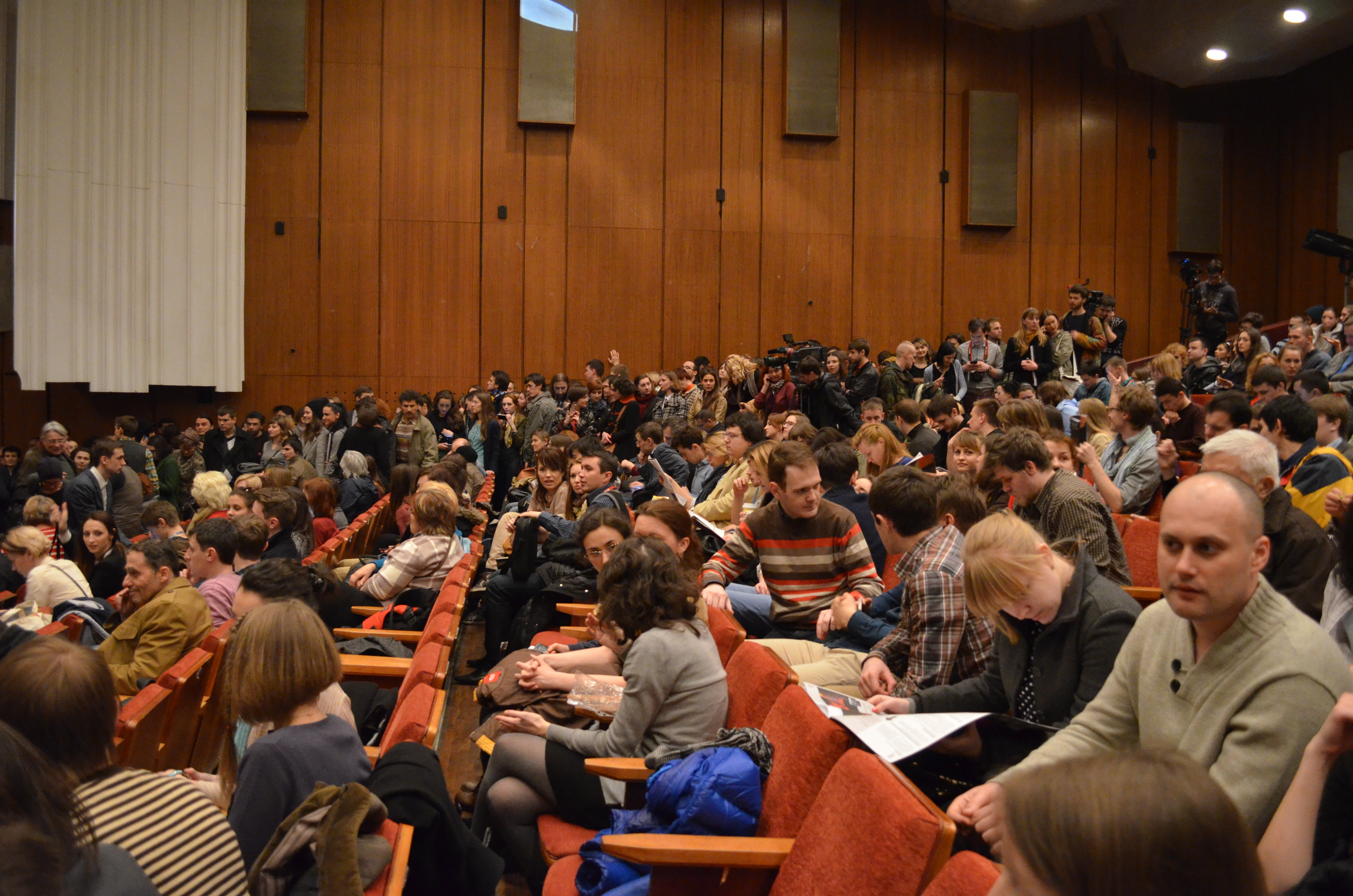
- Crowd at 2014 festival
- Location: Kyiv, Ukraine
- Founded: 2004; 22 years ago
- Awards: DOCU Competition Jury Awards
- Website: http://docudays.org.ua/

The DocuDays UA International Human Rights Documentary Film Festival is the only human rights film festival in Ukraine. The festival is held annually at Kyiv in March and admission is free to the general public. Each year, the festival has a different theme, and while not all movies shown adhere to that year's theme, all presented films are documentaries that focus on the subject of human rights.

== Founders ==
- DocuDays NGO
- Ukrainian Helsinki Human Rights Union
- Public organization South
- Charitable organization Fund of Mercy and Health (Kherson city)
- Center for Contemporary Information Technologies and Visual Arts, NGO

The program of the Festival, the jury, the topics of seminars and masterclasses, etc. are formed by the Executive Directorate.

== History ==
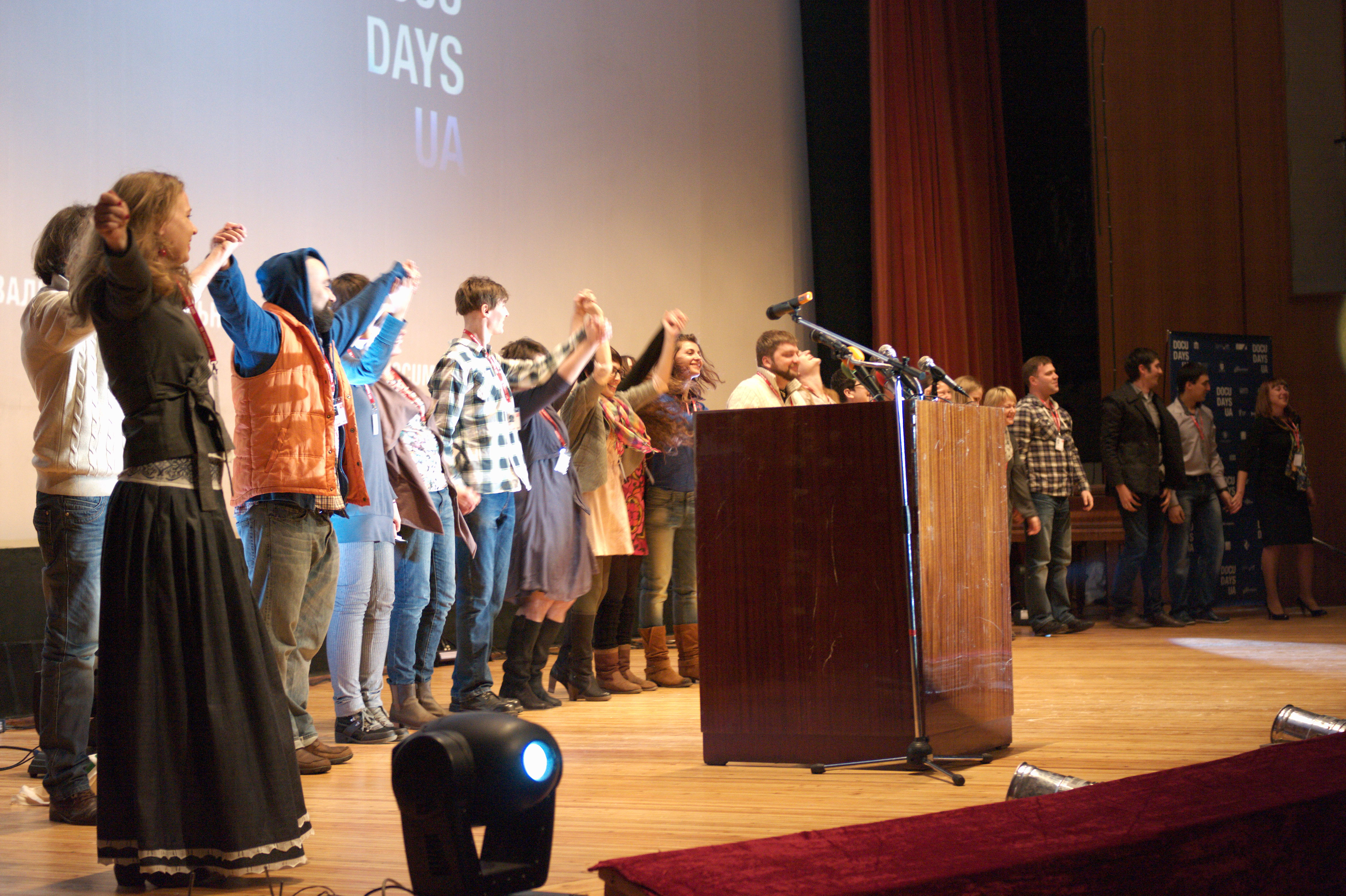
Opening ceremony of the 2013 DocuDays Festival

=== Human Rights Film Days Festival ===
The first Human Rights Film Days festival took place in 2003. Screenings were held in Lviv, Odesa, Kharkiv, and Donetsk.

The documentaries were divided into thematic blocks devoted to specific human rights aspects: human rights, refugee and migrant issues, children's and women's rights, etc. Additionally, such programs as Special Look and Feature Film were held alongside the festival.

=== II Festival of Human Rights Documentary Film Days: Ukrainian Context ===
The second festival took place in 2005 in Kyiv and had the additional title Ukrainian Context. This time, the program featured non-fiction films. Screenings took place in cinemas, clubs, art centers, schools, and universities.

=== III Festival of Human Rights Documentary Film Days: Ukrainian Context ===
In 2006, at the International Documentary Film Festival in Amsterdam (IDFA), Ukrainian Context was accepted into the International Human Rights Film Network (HRFN). Thus, Ukrainian Context was transformed into a platform where the best documentaries of Ukraine and other post-Soviet countries were presented. The festival lasted from May 21 to 26 in Kyiv. The first film to win the Grand Prix at the festival was The Children of Leningradsky by Polish directors Ganna Polak and Andrzej Celinski.

=== IV International Festival of Human Rights Documentary Film Days Ukrainian Context ===
The fourth festival traditionally took place in the Kyiv Cinema House and lasted from March 29 to April 6, 2007. The program included more than 100 films from 20 countries. The festival also hosted retrospective screenings and workshops of leading documentary experts.

=== V International Festival DocuDays UA Human Rights Documentary Film Days ===
In 2008, the festival acquired a new title - DocuDays UA International Human Rights Documentary Film Festival. The screenings lasted from March 28 to April 4. Films from more than fifty countries were submitted to the festival, expanding the geography of the festival beyond the neighboring countries.

The Audience Choice Award, chosen by secret audience ballot, was awarded to Chernobyl: The Invisible Thief by Bokel. For the first time, the opening ceremony is accompanied by a string orchestra, whereas the closing is held at the Ukrainian Center of Folk Culture - Ivan Honchar Museum.

== Films ==
=== 17th DocuDays ===
The following are selected films screened virtually at the 17th DocuDays in 2020:

- Don't Worry, the Doors Will Open (Oksana Karpovych)
- New Jerusalem (Yarema Malashchuk and Roman Himey)
- The Building (Tatjana Kononenko and Matilda Mester)
- The Earth Is Blue as an Orange (Iryna Tsilyk)
- War Note (Roman Liubyi)

=== 23rd DocuDays ===
The 23rd edition of the festival took place in Kyiv from June 5 to 12, 2026 bringing together 83 films from 36 countries. The main prize of the DOCU/UKRAINE competition was won by Don't Ask Me If I Killed.

== Accessibility ==
=== Screenings with audio description ===
Sound description (or audio description - AD) has been used in cinematography for over 40 years. AD is an additional soundtrack with a description of the film for the visually impaired audience.

In 2020, the soundtrack was created in collaboration with the NGO Fight for Rights within the project Affordable Cinema. After downloading the Earcatch application to the phone, the visually impaired get access to the film soundtrack.

=== Adapted subtitles ===
Adapted subtitles are a new practice for DocuDays UA. These are subtitles with special marks, symbols, and additional text that reflect the audio part of the film (music, soundtracks). Such subtitles allow people with hearing impairments to immerse themselves more in the cinematic atmosphere and monitor film content. All films in the 2020 program, except DOCU/UKRAINE and DOCU/CHILDREN, had adapted subtitles in Ukrainian.

=== Sign language translation ===
For the first time at the festival, all discussions within the human rights program RIGHTS NOW! had sign language translation.

== The purpose of the festival ==
The main goal of DocuDays UA is to enhance Ukrainian documentary filmmaking and initiate an open dialogue on pressing social problems.

Every year, the Organizing Committee chooses a theme for the festival that most accurately reflects the Ukrainian realis. In 2014, the theme of XI DocuDays UA was Ideorruption. This is a neologism the festival team came up with to denote the ideology of corruption. The symbol of the festival, which took place immediately after Euromaidan, was a burning heart in the form of a Molotov cocktail. The twelfth festival in 2015 raised the topic of propaganda under the motto: "True cinema protects!". The concept of the 2020 festival called "Teen Spirit: Here and Now" was dedicated to growing up, whereas the 2021 theme pertained to the human right to health.

== Awards ==
DocuDays presents the following awards annually, one in each category, each with a $1,000 prize:

- DOCU/LIFE Competition Jury Award
- DOCU/RIGHT Competition Jury Award
- DOCU/SHORT Competition Jury Award
- DOCU/UKRAINE Competition Jury Award
- RIGHTS NOW! Special Award (2021 only)
