= 17 (2026 film) =

- International promotional poster
- Directed by: Kosara Mitić
- Written by: Kosara Mitić; Ognjen Sviličić
- Produced by: Tomi Salkovski; Kristijan Burovski; Miroslav Mogorović; Vlado Bulajić; Lija Pogačnik
- Starring: Eva Kostić; Martina Danilovska; Dame Joveski; Eva Stojcevska; Petar Manic
- Cinematography: Naum Doksevski
- Edited by: Vladimir Pavlovski
- Production companies: Black Cat Production; Art & Popcorn; December
- Release dates: 18 February 2026 (Berlinale); 5 November 2026 (North Macedonia)
- Running time: 105 minutes
- Countries: North Macedonia; Serbia; Slovenia
- Language: Macedonian

17 is a 2026 drama film directed by Kosara Mitić, in her debut feature, and co-written by Ognjen Sviličić. It stars Eva Kostić, Martina Danilovska, Dame Joveski and Eva Stojcevska.

The film had its world premiere in the Perspectives section of the 76th Berlin International Film Festival on 18 February 2026, where it was nominated for the Best First Feature Award. It was also selected as the Macedonian entry for the Best International Feature Film at the 99th Academy Awards.

== Premise ==
Seventeen-year-old Sara is hiding a secret on a school trip. When the trip spirals out of control and Sara witnesses a classmate's sexual assault, she and the girl seal a bond that will last forever.

== Cast ==
- Eva Kostić as Sara
- Martina Danilovska as Lina
- Dame Joveski as Filip
- Eva Stojcevska as Nina
- Petar Manic as Caki

== Production ==
Principal photography began on April 25, 2024, in Skopje, for a new drama film directed by Kosara Mitić and co-written by Ognjen Sviličić, that served as a co-production between North Macedonia, Serbia, and Slovenia, and wrapped at the end of May. In January 2026, Totem has taken on the international sales for the film.

== Release ==
17 premiered at the 76th Berlin International Film Festival on 18 February 2026. It was also selected for the 32nd Sarajevo Film Festival, where it competed for Heart of Sarajevo award in the Competition Programme - Feature Film on 17 August 2026. In the late August 2026, it was showcased at the Norwegian International Film Festival in Young Movie section.

It was also selected as the Macedonian entry for the Best International Feature Film at the 99th Academy Awards.

== Accolades ==
Award	Date of ceremony	Category	Recipient	Result	Ref.
Berlin International Film Festival	22 February 2026	Perspectives Award	Kosara Mitic	Nominated	
Jerusalem Film Festival	16 July 2026	GWFF Award for International Debut	17	Won	
Sarajevo Film Festival	21 August 2026	Heart of Sarajevo	17	Nominated	

== See also ==
- List of submissions to the 99th Academy Awards for Best International Feature Film
- List of Macedonian submissions for the Academy Award for Best International Feature Film
