= Bugboy =

2026 Greek documentary film

- Promotional poster
- Directed by: Lucas Paleocrassas
- Screenplay by: Lucas Paleocrassas
- Produced by: Rea Apostolides; Yuri Averof; Adam Leibovitz; Maria Stevnbak Westergren; Madeleine Avramoussis
- Cinematography: Carlos Muñoz Gómez-Quintero
- Edited by: Estephan Wagner
- Music by: Florencia Di Concilio
- Production companies: Anemon Productions; Flach Film Production; Toolbox Film
- Distributed by: Autlook Filmsales
- Release dates: 12 March 2026 (Thessaloniki); 20 August 2026 (Sarajevo)
- Running time: 88 minutes
- Countries: Greece; France; Denmark
- Languages: Greek; English

Bugboy is a 2026 documentary film written and directed by Lucas Paleocrassas. A co-production between Greece, France and Denmark, the film follows George, a shy teenager with misaligned eyes, who struggles to connect with others after his parents' traumatic divorce.

The film had its world premiere in the International Competition at the Thessaloniki Documentary Festival on 12 March 2026.

It will hold its Regional Premiere at the 32nd Sarajevo Film Festival on 20 August 2026, screening in the Competition Programme – Documentary Film 2026, and competing for the Heart of Sarajevo award.

== Synopsis ==
The film documents George’s journey of self-discovery as he accepts his true self and realizes that he need not be alone any longer.

George is a quiet teen with crossed eyes who finds it hard to talk to people after his parents go through a painful divorce. He escapes into insect watching and becomes close to a cricket he names "Isabella." Spending time with her helps him see himself differently and slowly realise where he fits. The story shows that even tiny creatures can guide us toward belonging and self-growth.

== Release ==
Bugboy had its world premiere at the Thessaloniki Documentary Festival on 12 March 2026 in the international competition. Subsequently in May 2026 it was screened at the Millennium Docs Against Gravity in Millennium Bank Award – Grand Prix.

It had its United Kingdom premiere at the Sheffield DocFest on 11 June 2026 in People & Community. In July 2026, it was showcased at the Giffoni Film Festival in Films in Competition.

It had its Regional Premiere at the 32nd Sarajevo Film Festival, where it competes for Heart of Sarajevo award in the Competition Programme – Documentary Film 2026 on 20 August 2026.

It will be screened in Documentary Competition section of the Zurich Film Festival on 27 September 2026.

== Accolades ==
The film was shortlisted for a nomination at the 39th European Film Awards in the Documentary category.

Award	Date of ceremony	Category	Recipient	Result	Ref.
Millennium Docs Against Gravity	14 May 2026	The ART.DOC Award	Bugboy	Won	
Sarajevo Film Festival	21 August 2026	Heart of Sarajevo Award for Best Documentary Film	Bugboy	Nominated	
