= List of submissions to the 99th Academy Awards for Best International Feature Film =

2026 Best International Feature submissions

Highlights
- Oscar winner: TBD
- Submissions: 101
- Qualified: 4
- Debuts: 3
- Total eligible: 105

This is a list of submissions to the 99th Academy Awards for the Best International Feature Film. The Academy of Motion Picture Arts and Sciences (AMPAS) has invited the film industries of various countries to submit their best film for the Academy Award for Best International Feature Film every year since the award was created in 1956. The award is presented annually by the Academy to a feature-length motion picture produced outside the United States that contains primarily non-English dialogue. The International Feature Film Award Committee oversees the process and reviews all the submitted films. The category was previously called the Best Foreign Language Film, but this was changed in April 2019 to Best International Feature Film, after the Academy deemed the word "Foreign" to be outdated.

Beginning with the 99th ceremony, rules were changed to the submission process allowing non-English-language films to be submitted if they win a qualifying award at any of the following international film festivals: Berlinale (Golden Bear), Busan (Best Film Award), Cannes (Palme d'Or), Sundance (World Cinema Grand Jury Prize Dramatic and Documentary), Toronto (Platform Prize) and Venice (Golden Lion).

For the 99th Academy Awards, the submitted motion pictures must have been first released theatrically in their respective countries between 1 October 2025 and 30 September 2026. The deadline for submissions to the Academy was 30 September 2026. A record 101 countries submitted films, alongside four films qualified through film festivals (although seven films won qualifying awards, three of them were also submitted by their native countries). Cyprus, El Salvador and Rwanda submitted a film for the first time, while the Democratic Republic of the Congo and Sri Lanka made submissions for the first time since 1997 and 2009, respectively.

== Submissions ==
Submitting country	Film title used in nomination	Original title	Language(s)	Director(s)	Result
Albania	A State Film	Film di Stato / Film i Shtetit	Albanian	Roland Sejko	TBD
Algeria	Roqia	رقية	Arabic	Yanis Koussim	TBD
Argentina	The Virgin of the Quarry Lake	La virgen de la tosquera	Spanish	Laura Casabé	TBD
Armenia	In the Land of Arto	Le Pays d'Arto / Արտոյի Երկւրը	French, Armenian, English	Tamara Stepanyan	TBD
Australia	First Light		Filipino	James J. Robinson	TBD
Austria	Rose		German	Markus Schleinzer	TBD
Azerbaijan	Taghiyev: School	Tağıyev: Məktəb	Azerbaijani	Zaur Gasimli	TBD
Bangladesh	Roid	রইদ	Bengali	Mejbaur Rahman Sumon	TBD
Belgium	Coward		French, Dutch	Lukas Dhont	TBD
Bolivia	The Condor Daughter	La hija cóndor	Quechua, Spanish	Álvaro Olmos Torrico	TBD
Bosnia and Herzegovina	The Widower	Udovac	Bosnian	Hari Šečić	TBD
Brazil	Gugu's World	Feito Pipa	Portuguese	Allan Deberton	TBD
Bulgaria	The Dreamed Adventure	Das Geträumte Abenteuer / Мечтаното Приключение	Bulgarian, German	Valeska Grisebach	TBD
Cambodia	Becoming Human	ជាតិជាមនុស្សា	Khmer	Polen Ly	TBD
Cameroon	Mabanda		Cameroonian Pidgin English	Kang Quintus	TBD
Canada	Nina Roza		Bulgarian, French	Geneviève Dulude-de Celles	TBD
Chad	Soumsoum, the Night of the Stars	Soumsoum, la nuit des astres	French, Arabic	Mahamat-Saleh Haroun	TBD
Chile	The Meltdown	El deshielo	Spanish, German, English	Manuela Martelli	TBD
China	Once Upon a Time in the Middle East	欢迎来龙餐馆 / مرحبًا بكم في مطعمِ التنينِ	Mandarin, Arabic, English	Wen Muye	TBD
Colombia	Rains Over Babel	Llueve sobre Babel	Spanish	Gala del Sol	TBD
Costa Rica	If We Don't Burn, How Do We Light Up the Night	Si no ardemos, cómo iluminar la noche	Spanish	Kim Torres	TBD
Croatia	God Will Not Help	Bog neće pomoći	Croatian, Spanish	Hana Jušić	TBD
Cuba	Malecón		Spanish	Carlos Larrazabal	TBD
Cyprus	Hold onto Me	Κράτα Με	Greek	Myrsini Aristidou	TBD
Czech Republic	If Pigeons Turned to Gold	Kdyby se holubi proměnili ve zlato	Czech, English	Pepa Lubojacki	TBD
Democratic Republic of the Congo	Rumba Royale		French	Yohane Dean Lengol and Hamed Mobasser	TBD
Denmark	Woman Unknown (Note: Although automatically qualified under the category's new rules as the 2026 Venice International Film Festival Golden Lion winner, Woman Unknown was ultimately submitted as the Danish entry.)	Kvinde ukendt	Danish	May el-Toukhy	TBD
Dominican Republic	Melodrama		Spanish, French, Haitian Creole	Andrés Farías	TBD
Ecuador	Hiedra		Spanish	Ana Cristina Barragán	TBD
Egypt	The Stories	القِصَص	Arabic, English, German	Abu Bakr Shawky	TBD
El Salvador	Vertices	Vértices	Spanish	Arturo López Rodas	TBD
Estonia	Our Erika	Meie Erika	Estonian	German Golub	TBD
Finland	The Squirrel	Orava	Finnish	Markus Lehmusruusu	TBD
France	Minotaur	Минотавр	Russian	Andrey Zvyagintsev	TBD
Georgia	Guria	გურია	Georgian	Levan Koguashvili	TBD
Germany	Everytime		German, Spanish	Sandra Wollner	TBD
Greece	Broken Vein	Σπασμένη φλέβα	Greek	Yannis Economides	TBD
Guatemala	Cordillera de Fuego		Spanish, Kaqchikel, Tzʼutujil	Jayro Bustamante	TBD
Hong Kong	Sons of the Neon Night	風林火山	Cantonese	Juno Mak	TBD
Hungary	Silent Friend	Stille Freundin / Csendes barát	German, English, Cantonese	Ildikó Enyedi	TBD
Iceland	The Ground Beneath Our Feet	Jörðin undir fótum okkar	Icelandic	Yrsa Roca Fannberg	TBD
India	Gondhal	गोंधळ	Marathi	Santosh Davakhar	TBD
Indonesia	Four Seasons in Java	Empat Musim Pertiwi	Indonesian, Javanese	Kamila Andini	TBD
Iran	Land of Angels	سرزمین فرشته ها	Arabic	Babak Khajehpasha	TBD
Iraq	No Paradise If You Are Killed by a Woman	بەهەشت نابینیت ئەگەر ژن بتکوژێت	Kurdish, Arabic, Norwegian, English	Halkawt Mustafa	TBD
Ireland	Aontas		Irish	Damian McCann	TBD
Israel	Tell Me Everything	עצמאות	Hebrew	Moshe Rosenthal	TBD
Italy	The Spiral	L'estranea	Italian	Paolo Strippoli	TBD
Japan	All of a Sudden	Soudain / 急に具合が悪くなる	French, Japanese	Ryusuke Hamaguchi	TBD
Jordan	Sink	غرق	Arabic	Zain Duraie	TBD
Kazakhstan	Abel	Әбіл	Kazakh	Elzat Eskendir	TBD
Kenya	One Woman One Bra		Maasai, Swahili, English	Vincho Nchogu	TBD
Kosovo	Dua		Albanian, Serbian	Blerta Basholli	TBD
Kyrgyzstan	Kassandra	Кассандра	Kyrgyz	Bekzat Pirmatov	TBD
Latvia	Ulya	Uļa	Latvian	Viesturs Kairišs	TBD
Lebanon	Furies	غضب	Arabic	Rami Kodeih	TBD
Lithuania	How to Divorce During the War	Skyrybos karo metu	Lithuanian, English, Russian, Ukrainian	Andrius Blaževičius	TBD
Luxembourg	Child		French, English, Luxembourgish	Cyrus Neshvad	TBD
Malaysia	The Fox King	Semusim Lara	Malay, Japanese, Indonesian, English	Woo Ming Jin	TBD
Malta	Żejtune		Maltese	Alex Camilleri	TBD
Mexico	En el Camino		Spanish	David Pablos	TBD
Mongolia	Independence: Keeper of the Decree	Тусгаар тогтнол: Бошиг сахигч	Mongolian	Tamir Bat-Ulzii	TBD
Montenegro	To Hold a Mountain (Note: Although automatically qualified under the category's new rules as the 2026 Sundance Film Festival World Cinema Documentary winner, To Hold a Mountain was ultimately submitted as the Montenegrin entry.)	Planina	Montenegrin	Biljana Tutorov and Petar Glomazić	TBD
Morocco	Strawberries	La más dulce / الفراولة	Arabic, Spanish	Laïla Marrakchi	TBD
Nepal	Elephants in the Fog	तिनीहरू	Nepali, Bhojpuri	Abinash Bikram Shah	TBD
Netherlands	Paikar	پیکار	Dari, Dutch, English	Dawood Hilmandi	TBD
New Zealand	Mārama		English, Māori	Taratoa Stappard	TBD
Nigeria	Dear Ajayi		Nigerian Pidgin, Igbo, Yoruba	Damilola Orimogunje	TBD
North Macedonia	17		Macedonian	Kosara Mitić	TBD
Norway	Growth of the Soil	Markens grøde	Norwegian	Hans Petter Moland	TBD
Pakistan	Hanging by a Wire	ہینگنگ بائی اے وائر	English, Urdu, Pashto	Mohammed Ali Naqvi	TBD
Palestine	Citizen Osama	المواطن أسامة	Arabic	Ahmed Hassouna	TBD
Panama	Chichero		Spanish	Aarón Bromley and Arturo Montenegro	TBD
Paraguay	Narciso		Spanish, Guarani	Marcelo Martinessi	TBD
Peru	Night Has Come	Vino la noche	Spanish	Paolo Tizón	TBD
Philippines	Filipiñana		Filipino, English, Ilocano	Rafael Manuel	TBD
Poland	Fatherland		German, English, French, Russian	Paweł Pawlikowski	TBD
Portugal	The Scent of Things Remembered	A Memória do Cheiro das Coisas	Portuguese	António Ferreira	TBD
Romania	Fjord (Note: Although automatically qualified under the category's new rules as the 2026 Cannes Film Festival Palme d'Or winner, Fjord was ultimately submitted as the Romanian entry.)		Norwegian, English, Romanian, Swedish	Cristian Mungiu	TBD
Rwanda	Ben'Imana		Kinyarwanda	Marie Clémentine Dusabejambo	TBD
Saudi Arabia	A Matter of Life and Death	مسألة حياة أو موت	Arabic	Anas Ba-Tahaf	TBD
Senegal	Liti Liti		Wolof, French	Mamadou Khouma Gueye	TBD
Serbia	Wanderlust	Izlet	Serbian	Nenad Pavlović	TBD
Singapore	We Are All Strangers	我们不是陌生人	Mandarin, Hokkien, English	Anthony Chen	TBD
Slovakia	Flood	Potopa	Rusyn, Slovak	Martin Gonda	TBD
Slovenia	Fantasy		Slovenian, Albanian, Serbian, Bosnian, Macedonian	Kukla	TBD
South Africa	Variations on a Theme	Variasies op 'n Tema	Afrikaans	Devon Delmar and Jason Jacobs	TBD
South Korea	Possible Love	가능한 사랑	Korean	Lee Chang-dong	TBD
Spain	La Bola Negra		Spanish	Javier Calvo and Javier Ambrossi	TBD
Sri Lanka	Riverstone	රිවස්ටන්	Sinhala	Lalith Rathnayake	TBD
Sweden	Adult Supervision	Arkipelag	Swedish	Alex Schulman	TBD
Switzerland	Who Is Still Alive	Qui vit encore	Arabic	Nicolas Wadimoff	TBD
Syria	The Other Side of the Sun	الجانب الآخر من الشمس	Arabic	Tawfik Sabouni	TBD
Taiwan	A Foggy Tale	大濛	Taiwanese Hokkien, Mandarin	Chen Yu-hsun	TBD
Thailand	9 Temples to Heaven	9 วัดสู่สวรรค์	Thai	Sompot Chidgasornpongse	TBD
Turkey	Like a Limbless Tree	Kesilmiş Bir Ağaç Gibi	Turkish	Tunç Davut	TBD
Ukraine	Traces	Сліди	Ukrainian	Alisa Kovalenko	TBD
United Kingdom	Rehearsals for a Revolution	خاطرات ایران	Persian, English	Pegah Ahangarani	TBD
Uruguay	A Loose End	Un cabo suelto	Spanish	Daniel Hendler	TBD
Venezuela	Death Has No Master	La muerte no tiene dueño	Spanish, Italian	Jorge Thielen Armand	TBD
Vietnam	Spirit Guardians: The Last Secret of the First Emperor	Hộ Linh Tráng Sĩ: Bí Ẩn Mộ Vua Đinh	Vietnamese	Nguyễn Phan Quang Bình	TBD

== Qualified in film festival ==
Festival	Film title used in nomination	Original title	Language(s)	Director(s)	Result
Berlinale	Yellow Letters	Gelbe Briefe	Turkish	İlker Çatak	TBD
Busan	Midday Meal	غذای نیمروز	Persian	Majid Majidi	TBD
Cannes	Fjord		Norwegian, English, Romanian, Swedish	Cristian Mungiu	TBD
Sundance	Shame and Money	Hatixhja dhe Shabani	Albanian	Visar Morina	TBD
Sundance	To Hold a Mountain	Planina	Montenegrin	Biljana Tutorov and Petar Glomazić	TBD
Toronto	Angh		Konyak, English	Theja Rio	TBD
Venice	Woman Unknown	Kvinde ukendt	Danish	May el-Toukhy	TBD

== Notes ==
- The Netherlands' selection process was the subject of controversy. After the documentary Paikar by Dawood Hilmandi was announced as the Dutch selection, director Mike van Diem criticized the choice of a documentary over fiction films, including van Diem's own film Our Girls. Van Diem's 1997 film Character won the Netherlands' most recent Oscar for Best Foreign Language Film at the 70th Academy Awards. With the support of film journalist René Mioch, van Diem unsuccessfully attempted to have the committee revote. He also questioned why the names of the selection committee's participants were not made public. SEE NL, the committee's organizer, announced the names of participants would be disclosed in subsequent years.
- Romania's submission Fjord initially qualified after winning the 2026 Cannes Film Festival Palme d'Or. Following its Cannes win, Deadline reported the film would not qualify for Best International Feature Film since its main language was ostensibly English. In July 2026, the American distributor Neon confirmed that the film meets the Academy's requirements for non-English language submissions.
- The Oscar selection committees for Bhutan, Madagascar, Papua New Guinea,, Tunisia, Uzbekistan, and Zambia invited filmmakers to make submissions, but did not end up sending a film.
