= Holy Defiance =

2026 short documentary film

- Promotional poster
- Croatian: Tiha misa
- Literally: Silent mass
- Directed by: Karla Jelić
- Written by: Karla Jelić
- Produced by: Vinko Brešan; Julia Martinović; Nebojša Slijepčević
- Starring: Arijana Lekić Fridrih
- Cinematography: Dora Čaldarović
- Edited by: Maja Predrijevac
- Production company: Ustanova Zagreb film
- Distributed by: Ustanova Zagreb film
- Release dates: 11 June 2026 (Sheffield DocFest); 18 August 2026 (Sarajevo)
- Running time: 15 minutes
- Country: Croatia
- Language: Croatian

Holy Defiance (Croatian: Tiha misa) is a 2026 short documentary film written and directed by Karla Jelić. It follows multimedia artist Arijana Lekić as her "Holy Defiance" creates a vivid, lively, energetic and varied portrait of women's rights in post-war Croatia.

The film had its world premiere in Short Films at the Sheffield DocFest on 11 June 2026 in Activism programme. and its regional premiere at the 32nd Sarajevo Film Festival on 18 August 2026, in the Competition programme - short documentary film, where it won Heart of Sarajevo for Best Short Documentary Film award.

== Synopsis ==
Background

On the first Saturday of every month, groups of men who call themselves "The Knights of the Immaculate Heart of Mary" occupy central squares across Croatian cities. Kneeling in prayer, they advocate for patriarchy, re-traditionalization, and restrictions on women's freedoms, transforming public spaces into zones where women are barred from entering, even when they wish to pray themselves.

Silent Mass

Arijana travels to a different city each month to perform her quiet yet radical feminist intervention, "Silent Mass", weaving red string through the cordoned-off areas to reclaim space symbolically. What begins as indifference from the prayer participants escalates into hostility, intimidation, and aggressive confrontations involving the men, hired security, and even police. As the chants calling for male spiritual dominance drone on, Arijana's persistent, silent presence becomes an act of profound courage.

== Cast ==
- Arijana Lekić Fridrih

== Release ==
Holy Defiance had its world premiere at the Sheffield DocFest on 10 June 2026 in Shorts: Thresholds of Faith strand.

It also competed for Heart of Sarajevo award in the Competition programme - Short Documentary Film at the 32nd Sarajevo Film Festival on 18 August 2026.

== Accolades ==
Award	Date of ceremony	Category	Recipient	Result	Ref.
Sarajevo Film Festival	21 August 2026	Heart of Sarajevo for Best Short Documentary Film	Holy Defiance	Won	
