= Kontakt (film) =

Kontakt is a 2005 Macedonian film directed by Sergej Stanojkovski. It was Macedonia's submission to the 79th Academy Awards for the Academy Award for Best Foreign Language Film, but was not accepted as a nominee.

== Cast ==
- Nikola Kojo
- Labina Mitevska
- Petar Mircevski
- Vesna Petrushevska
- Necip Memili

== See also ==
- List of Macedonian submissions for the Academy Award for Best Foreign Language Film
- List of submissions to the 79th Academy Awards for Best Foreign Language Film
