= Bear with Me (film) =

2026 Bulgarian documentary film

- Promotional poster
- German: Ein Bär fürs Leben
- Directed by: Martin Genovski
- Screenplay by: Mikhail Veshim; Martin Genovski
- Produced by: Patrick Hörl; Andreas Martin; Julia Göring
- Starring: Maxy Niedermeyer; Natasha the Bear; Marcello Martino; Bilyana Kirilov; Kiril Kirilov; Robert Kruijff; Dragomir Draganov; Martina Troanska
- Cinematography: Vladimir Trifonov
- Edited by: Bohos Topakbashian
- Music by: Alexander Kostov
- Production companies: AGITPROP; Autentic Studios; Martichka Bozhilova
- Distributed by: Movies for Festivals
- Release date: 18 August 2026 (Sarajevo)
- Running time: 84 minute
- Country: Bulgaria
- Languages: Bulgarian; English; German; Italian; Dutch

Bear with Me is a 2026 Bulgarian documentary film co-written and directed by Martin Genovski. The film tells the story of the retired circus trainer Maxy, who lives with her last living bear Natasha in a parking lot near Amsterdam.

It held its world premiere at the 32nd Sarajevo Film Festival on 18 August 2026, screening in the Competition Programme – Documentary Film 2026, and competed for the Heart of Sarajevo award.

== Summary ==
The film's story is a touching look at love, loyalty, questions about animal treatment, and the fading of a whole era.

Maxy Niedermeyer, an 80-year-old German-born Jewish woman who survived World War II and once starred in the circus, now lives in a parking lot near Amsterdam with Natasha, her last remaining bear. She grew up in a circus family and began performing with wild animals at an age of 11 in the former East Germany, continuing for sixty years. But when society began rejecting animal acts, her career and way of life fell apart. Today, Natasha is the only family Maxy has left, and the only reason she still has somewhere to live.

== Cast ==
- Maxy Niedermeyer
- Natasha the Bear
- Marcello Martino
- Bilyana Kirilov
- Kiril Kirilov
- Robert Kruijff
- Dragomir Draganov
- Martina Troanska as the young Maxy

== Release ==
Bear with Me had its World Premiere at the 32nd Sarajevo Film Festival, where it competed for Heart of Sarajevo award in the Competition Programme – Documentary Film 2026 on 18 August 2026.

The film was acquired by German broadcaster ZDF/Arte for its prestigious prime-time documentary strand Grand Format in August 2026.

== Accolades ==
Award	Date of ceremony	Category	Recipient	Result	Ref.
Sarajevo Film Festival	21 August 2026	Heart of Sarajevo Award for Best Documentary Film	Bear with Me	Nominated	
