= God Exists, Her Name Is Petrunija =

2019 film

- Film poster
- Macedonian: Господ постои, името ѝ е Петрунија
- Directed by: Teona Strugar Mitevska
- Written by: Teona Strugar Mitevska
- Starring: Zorica Nusheva
- Release date: 10 February 2019 (Berlin)
- Country: Macedonia
- Language: Macedonian

God Exists, Her Name Is Petrunija (Macedonian: Господ постои, името ѝ е Петрунија, romanized: Gospod postoi, imeto ì e Petrunija), also spelt Petrunya in English translation, is a 2019 Macedonian drama film written and directed by Teona Strugar Mitevska. It tells the story of a woman who wins a local contest, but because it is usually reserved for men she becomes ostracised for it. The film was selected to compete for the Golden Bear at the 69th Berlin International Film Festival, and won the LUX Prize and several other awards, as well as being nominated for others.

== Cast ==
- Zorica Nusheva as Petrunija
- Labina Mitevska as Journalist Slavica
- Stefan Vujisic as Younger Officer Darko
- Suad Begovski as The Priest
- Petar Mircevski as Stojan

== Awards ==
- 2019 LUX Prize
- German Film Guild and Ecumenical Prizes at the Berlin Film Festival
