= Skateboarding Is Not for Girls =

- Theatrical release poster
- Macedonian: Скејтбордингот не е за девојчиња
- Directed by: Dina Duma
- Written by: Dina Duma; Lidija Mojsovska; Teona Strugar Mitevska
- Produced by: Labina Mitevska; Sébastien Delloye; Danijel Hočevar; Vanja Sremac
- Starring: Efkjar Abaz; Džefrina Jašari; Simonida Selimovič; Ganimet Abdula; Labina Mitevska
- Cinematography: Frédéric Noirhomme
- Edited by: Alain Dessauvage; Pierpaolo Filomeno
- Music by: Jura Ferina; Pavle Miholjević
- Production companies: Entre Chien et Loup; Vertigo; Terminal 3; Sister and Brother Mitevski
- Release date: 4 June 2026 (Tribeca Festival)
- Running time: 82 minutes
- Countries: North Macedonia; Belgium; Slovenia; Croatia
- Language: Macedonian

Skateboarding Is Not for Girls (Macedonian: Скејтбордингот не е за девојчиња, romanized: Skejbordingot ne e za devojchinja) is a 2026 sports drama film written and directed by Dina Duma. It stars Efkjar Abaz, Džefrina Jašari, Simonida Selimovič, Ganimet Abdula, and Labina Mitevska.

Skateboarding Is Not for Girls had its world premiere at the Tribeca Festival on June 4, 2026, where it won the Nora Ephron Award.

== Premise ==
In this portrait of a new generation of young women coming of age amidst two worlds, the custom of arranged marriage threatens to separate sisters Adela and Zara.

== Cast ==
- Efkjar Abaz as Adela
- Džefrina Jašari as Zara
- Simonida Selimovič as Esma
- Ganimet Abdula as Aida
- Labina Mitevska as Natasha

== Production ==
Dina Duma (2026)

In August 2022, it was reported that a sports drama film written and directed by Dina Duma, with the cast primary featuring Balkan Romani was in development. Principal photography began in early April 2024, in Skopje, and wrapped the next month. In April 2026, it was reported that Kinology would handle the international sales.

== Release ==
Skateboarding Is Not for Girls had its world premiere at the Tribeca Festival on June 4, 2026.

It had its European Premiere at the 32nd Sarajevo Film Festival, where it competed for Heart of Sarajevo award in the Competition Programme - Feature Film on 21 August 2026.

The film will compete at the 21st Rome Film Festival in 'Progressive Cinema Competition - Visions for the World of Tomorrow' in October 2026.

== Accolades ==
Award	Date of ceremony	Category	Recipient	Result	Ref.
Tribeca Festival	10 June 2026	Nora Ephron Award	Dina Duma	Won	
Jerusalem Film Festival	16 July 2026	Cummings Award for Best Film	Skateboarding Is Not for Girls	Won	
Sarajevo Film Festival	21 August 2026	Heart of Sarajevo	Skateboarding Is Not for Girls	Nominated	
