= Everything That's Wrong with You =

2026 Slovenian drama film

Everything that's Wrong with You
- Promotional poster
- Slovene: Vse, kar je narobe s tabo, fiction
- Directed by: Urša Menart
- Screenplay by: Ursa Menart
- Produced by: Katja Lenarčič; Danijel Hočevar
- Starring: Anusha Kodelja; Klara Kuk; Mojca Fatur; Marjuta Slamic
- Cinematography: Roy van Egmond
- Edited by: Lukas Miheljak
- Music by: Alenja Pivko Kneževič; Simon Penšek
- Production companies: Vertigo; Thalia Productions; Chromosome film; Viba film film studio; Living Pictures
- Release date: 16 August 2026 (Sarajevo)
- Running time: 97 minutes
- Countries: Slovenia; Germany; Serbia
- Language: Slovene
- Budget: €1,234,900

Everything that's Wrong with You (Slovene: Vse, kar je narobe s tabo, fiction) is a 2026 drama film written, and directed by Urša Menart. A co-production between Slovenia, Serbia and Germany, it follows Maruša, a young woman in her mid-twenties dealing with her mother's illness, who forms an online bond with Alja, a nurse and social media influencer living abroad. When Alja falls ill, she travels to meet her.

It held its world premiere at the 32nd Sarajevo Film Festival on 16 August 2026, screening in the Competition Programme – Feature Film, and competed for the Heart of Sarajevo award.

== Synopsis ==
After losing her mother, Maruša leaves Ljubljana and goes to her estranged father's farm in the Slovenian countryside. Feeling like an outsider there, she forms an online friendship with Alja, a Slovenian nurse working in northern Germany coastal town. Alja, who suffers from an unexplained illness, regularly writes about her condition online, and the two women gradually become close. When Alja's health worsens, Maruša travels across Europe to care for her. However, she soon begins to suspect that Alja may be faking her illness to gain attention, while Maruša herself may not be entirely honest about her own reasons for visiting. When she confronts Alja and threatens to leave, Alja responds by taking increasingly extreme actions.

== Cast ==
- Anusha Kodelja as Marusa
- Klara Kuk as Alja
- Mojca Fatur
- Marjuta Slamic
- Matija Vastl
- Kaja Ocvirk
- Ivana Percan Kodarin
- Ernest Bruno
- Paola Brandenburg

== Production ==
On 13 December 2023, filming started on location in Tolmin a small town, situated up in the Julian Alps in the northwest of Slovenia. It was scheduled for 30 working days. Film was shot in and around Tolmin, Kranj, Nova Gorica and Ljubljana, and on the Baltic Sea island of Usedom.

In December 2025, the film was selected for the 16th edition of When East Meets West held from 18 to 20 January 2026, in Trieste, organised as part of the Trieste Film Festival. In First Cut+ the work-in-progress film was presented to potential buyers.

== Release ==
Everything that's Wrong with You had its World Premiere at the 32nd Sarajevo Film Festival, where it competed for Heart of Sarajevo award in the Competition Programme - Feature Film on 16 August 2026.

== Accolades ==
Award	Date of ceremony	Category	Recipient	Result	Ref.
Sarajevo Film Festival	21 August 2026	Heart of Sarajevo	Everything that's Wrong with You	Nominated	
