= When the Day Had No Name =

2017 film

- Film poster
- Directed by: Teona Strugar Mitevska
- Written by: Teona Strugar Mitevska
- Starring: Leon Ristov; Hanis Bagašov; Dragan Miševski; Stefan Kitanovic; Labina Mitevska
- Release date: 14 February 2017 (Berlin)
- Running time: 93 minutes
- Country: Macedonia
- Language: Macedonian

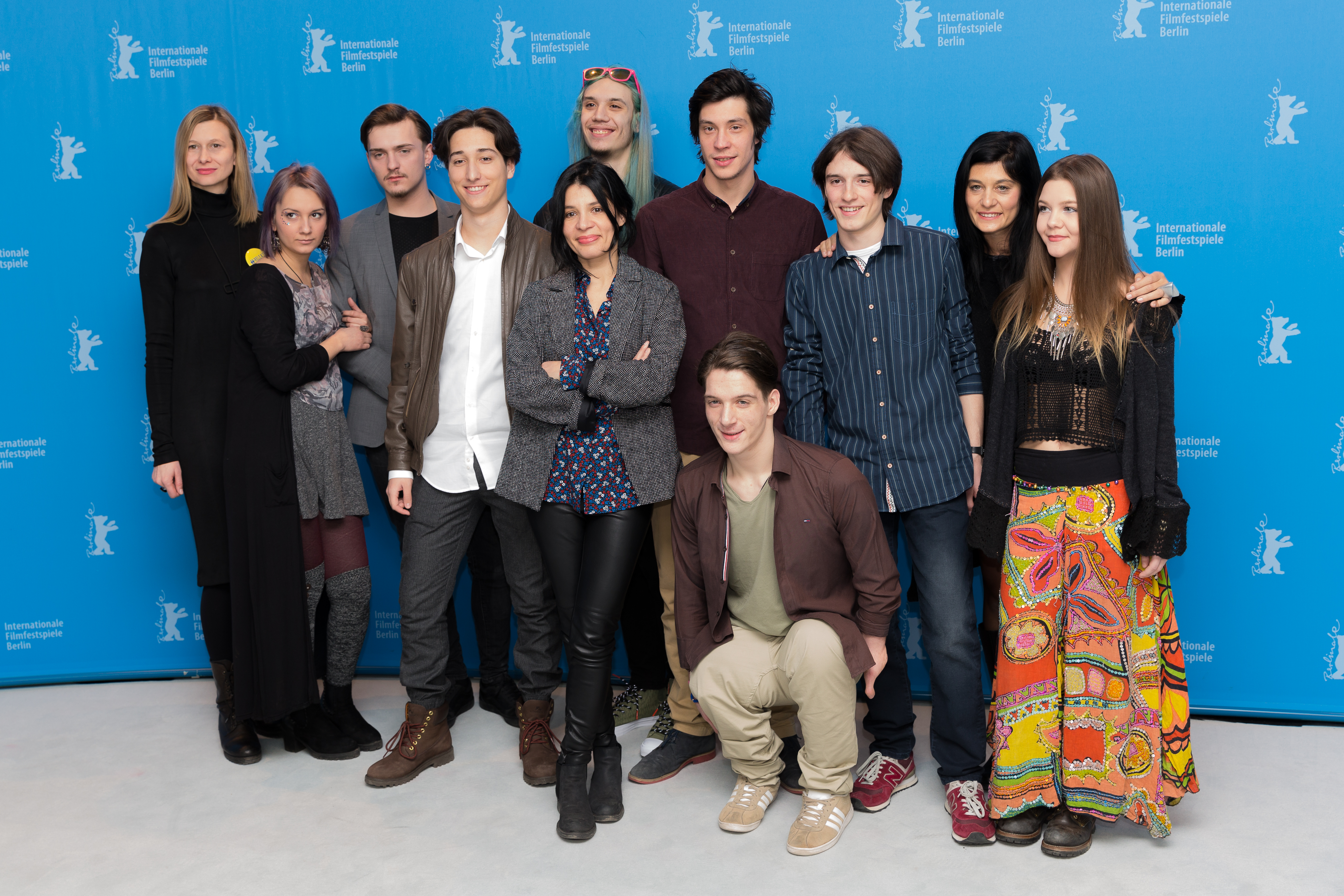
The film team at the Berlinale 2017

When the Day Had No Name or Koga denot nemaše ime (Кога денот немаше име) is a 2017 Macedonian drama film directed by Teona Strugar Mitevska. It was screened in the Panorama section at the 67th Berlin International Film Festival.

The film is a fiction work that covers the pre-incident investigation of a murder mystery which occurred in Skopje in 2012.

== Cast ==
- Leon Ristov as Milan
- Hanis Bagašov as Petar
- Dragan Miševski as Vladan
- Stefan Kitanovic as Ace
- Labina Mitevska as Milan's stepmother
