= Don't Ask Me If I Killed =

2026 Ukrainian documentary film

- Promotional poster
- Ukrainian: Не питай мене, чи я вбивала
- Directed by: Helena Maksyom
- Screenplay by: Helena Maksyom
- Produced by: Adrian Pirvu; Renko Douze; Yasmin C. Rams; Jeanne Dovhych; Hasse Van Nunen
- Cinematography: Helena Maksyom
- Edited by: Svitlana Zaloga; Helena Maksyom; Augustine Hujisser
- Distributed by: First Hand Films
- Release dates: 8 June 2026 (DocuDays UA); 15 August 2026 (Sarajevo)
- Running time: 104 minutes
- Countries: Ukraine; Romania; Netherlands; Germany
- Language: Ukrainian

Don't Ask Me If I Killed (Ukrainian: Не питай мене, чи я вбивала) is a 2026 documentary film directed by Helena Maksyom, who handled the cinematography too. Filmed over more than a thousand days, it records her transition from civilian documentarian to reserve officer following the Russian full-scale invasion of Ukraine.

An international co-production, the film premiered at DocuDays UA on 8 June 2026 in Docu/Ukraine, where it won the Main Prize of Docu/Ukraine Competition.

It held its International Premiere at the 32nd Sarajevo Film Festival on 15 August 2026, screening in the Competition Programme – Documentary Film 2026, and competed for the Heart of Sarajevo award.

== Summary ==
The film through Helena Maksyom's perspective becomes a reflection on endurance and moral weight. It is her personal diary of the war in Ukraine, filmed over more than a thousand days. When the invasion started, she was just a filmmaker with no experience in fighting. She volunteered, learned how to help the injured, learned how to fight, and eventually became an officer guiding others through the same danger she once faced alone. She recorded whenever she can. Her camera became both protection and witness, through which she captured not dramatic battle scenes but the everyday reality of surviving: the faces around her, the tiredness, the rare jokes, and the quiet moments after someone was lost. The war kept repeating; new soldiers, new battlefields, new burials, and each time she returned. Her relationship with her mother, seen only during short visits home, became a fragile link to her old life.

== Release ==
Don't Ask Me If I Killed premiered on 8 June 2026 as part of the DocuDays UA International Human Rights Documentary Film Festival in Docu/ Ukraine section, and was also nominated for Main Prize Rights Now!

It had its International Premiere at the 32nd Sarajevo Film Festival, where it competed for Heart of Sarajevo award in the Competition Programme – Documentary Film 2026 on 15 August 2026.

== Accolades ==
| Award | Date of ceremony | Category | Recipient | Result | Ref. |
|---|---|---|---|---|---|
| DocuDays UA International Human Rights Documentary Film Festival | 11 June 2026 | Main Prize of Docu/Ukraine Competition | Don't Ask Me If I Killed | Won | |
| DocuDays UA International Human Rights Documentary Film Festival | 11 June 2026 | Viktor Onysko Memorial Award for Best Editing in a Ukrainian Documentary Film | Svitlana Zaloga and Helena Maksyom | Won | |
| DocuDays UA International Human Rights Documentary Film Festival | 11 June 2026 | Main Prize Rights Now! | Don't Ask Me If I Killed | Nominated | |
| Sarajevo Film Festival | 21 August 2026 | Heart of Sarajevo Award for Best Documentary Film | Don't Ask Me If I Killed | Nominated | |
| Sarajevo Film Festival | 21 August 2026 | Special Award for Promoting Gender Equality | Don't Ask Me If I Killed | Special Mention | |
