= Electing Ms Santa =

2026 Moldovan documentary film

- Promotional poster
- Directed by: Raisa Răzmeriță
- Screenplay by: Raisa Răzmeriță; Ion Gnatiuc
- Produced by: Ion Gnatiuc
- Starring: Elena Cernei
- Cinematography: Ion Gnatiuc
- Edited by: Mircea Olteanu
- Music by: Dan-Stefan Rucareanu; Ioan Filip
- Production companies: HaiDOC Productions; Tangaj Production
- Release date: 13 November 2025 (PÖFF)
- Running time: 96 minutes
- Countries: Moldova; Romania
- Language: Romanian

Electing Ms Santa is a 2025 debut feature-length documentary film co-written and directed by Raisa Razmerita. A co-production between Moldova, and Romania, it follows a 42-year-old woman from a small Moldovan village who decides, against her family's wishes, to run for mayor in a country where presidential elections are generally won on misogynistic discourse.

The film had its world premiere In Doc@PÖFF International Competition at the Tallinn Black Nights Film Festival on 13 November 2025.

It held its Regional Premiere at the 32nd Sarajevo Film Festival on 17 August 2026, screening in the Competition Programme – Documentary Film 2026, and competed for the Heart of Sarajevo award.

== Summary ==
Elena is 42 and lives in a small, faraway village in Moldova. During the day, she works like any other villager, taking care of pigs, chickens, and a cow, while her strict mother, Ana, keeps an eye on everything she does. But Elena has another side to her life. She is the person who brings the whole village together: she gives donated goods to lonely older people, runs fun activities for children, and every year dresses up as Santa Claus to thank young volunteers. Even with all her chores, Elena wants to grow and learn. She takes online classes and listens to lessons while she milks the cow. She is ambitious and wants to change how things are done in her village, so she makes a brave decision: she chooses to contest the mayor elections.

== Cast ==
- Elena Cernei

== Production ==
In December 2019, it was selected at the When East Meets West 2020 project, where projects competed for the Film Center Serbia Development Award, the EAVE European Producers Workshop scholarship, the Cannes Producers Network Prize, and the Flow Postproduction Award of €15,000 in post-production services. In January 2020, the project won EAVE Producers Workshop scholarship. In January 2025, the project won Film Center Montenegro Award at the 2025 edition of When East Meets West, at Trieste, a port city in Italy.

== Release ==
Electing Ms Santa had its world premiere In Doc@PÖFF International Competition at the Tallinn Black Nights Film Festival on 13 November 2025, and the next day on 14 November 2025, it was screened at the Verzió International Human Rights Documentary Film Festival in Doc Future Competition. Subsequently it competed in Trieste Film Festival in Documentary competition in January 2026, and had its Italian Premiere.

In March 2026, it was screened in Artdocfest Open competition at the Artdocfest.

It had its Regional Premiere at the 32nd Sarajevo Film Festival, where it competes for Heart of Sarajevo award in the Competition Programme – Documentary Film 2026 on 17 August 2026.

== Reception ==
Writing for Cineuropa, Marko Stojiljković at 32nd Sarajevo Film Festival, finds that Raisa Răzmeriță’s "observational approach" is effective but heavily dependent on the cinematography of Ion Gnatiuc, whose technical execution is inconsistent, particularly in the poorly illuminated night sequences. Mircea Olteanu's editing nevertheless keeps the film coherent and accessible, while its soundtrack of local pop-folk music complements the setting. Stojiljković concludes that the film is neither innovative in its subject matter nor "technically groundbreaking", but praises it for its evident sincerity and earnestness.

== Accolades ==
Award	Date of ceremony	Category	Recipient	Result	Ref.
Tallinn Black Nights Film Festival	22 November 2025	Jury Special Prize	Electing Ms Santa	Won	
Trieste Film Festival	24 January 2026	CEI (Central European Initiative) Award	Electing Ms Santa	Won	
Sarajevo Film Festival	21 August 2026	Heart of Sarajevo Award for Best Documentary Film	Electing Ms Santa	Nominated	
