= Ivica Matić =

Bosnian and Yugoslav filmmaker (1948–1976)

Ivica Matić (Vareš, 13 May 1948 – Sarajevo, 24 October 1976) was a Bosnian director and cameraman.

== Biography ==
He worked professionally for Television Sarajevo as a cameraman (occasionally as a director) from 1968. At the same time he created an opus of exceptional amateur achievements, of which he is the full author. Ivica Matić graduated from the Camera Department in Zagreb in 1976. His only feature filmant is Landscape with a Woman (1976), a stylized essay on the artist-society relationship.

He died in 1976 in Sarajevo, at the age of 29.

The movie was finished by his friends and it won awards Special Grand Prize of the Jury, FIPRESCI Prize, Prize of the Ecumenical Jury of Montréal World Film Festival, as well as Grand Jury Prize of Annonay International Festival of First Films. Abdulah Sidran stated that no sentence of Matić's (script) writing should remain unrecorded. For example, his unfinished scenario Brides arriving was directed by Emir Kusturica for TV Sarajevo in 1979.
