= The Woman Who Brushed Off Her Tears =

- Film poster
- Directed by: Teona Strugar Mitevska
- Written by: Teona Strugar Mitevska
- Produced by: Labina Mitevska; Danijel Hocevar; Marcel Lenz; Sébastien Delloye; Diana Elbaum
- Release date: February 11, 2012 (Berlin)
- Running time: 103 minutes
- Countries: Macedonia; Germany; Slovenia; Belgium
- Languages: Macedonian; French; Turkish

The Woman Who Brushed Off Her Tears is a multilingual film directed by Teona Strugar Mitevska and produced by Labina Mitevska, Danijel Hocevar, Marcel Lenz, Sébastien Delloye, Diana Elbaum.

The film premiered during Panorama section of the 2012 Berlin International Film Festival.

== Plot ==
The storyline of the film revolves around the lives of two women (mothers) — coming from two different social background. The first mother is a Western woman, lives in France after tragic death of her son. The other woman comes from a patriarchal society. She lives with her father Ismail. The first woman has lost interest about life and wants to die, but the second woman is desirous to live.

== Cast ==
- Victoria Abril as Helena
- Labina Mitevska as Ajsun
- Jean Marie Galey as Emil
- Arben Bajraktaraj as Lucian
- Firdaus Nebi as Ismail
- Dimitar Gjorgjievski as Noah
- Katarina Orlandic
