= God Is Shy =

2025 French animated short film

God is Shy
- Promotional poster
- Directed by: Jocelyn Charles
- Written by: Jocelyn Charles
- Produced by: Joséphine Mancini; Félix de Givry; Ugo Bienvenu
- Starring: Anthony Bajon; Alba Gaïa Bellugi; Danièle Evenou
- Music by: P.R2B
- Production company: Remembers
- Distributed by: Manifest
- Release date: 19 May 2025 (Cannes)
- Running time: 16 minutes
- Country: France
- Language: French

God is Shy (French: Dieu est timide) is a 2025 French animated short film written and directed by Jocelyn Charles. The 16-minute film, which follows passengers sharing scary stories aboard a high-speed train, had its world premiere on May 19, 2025, at Semaine de la Critiqueduring the Cannes Film Festival. It has since been selected for over 200 international film festivals, including the Annecy International Animation Film Festival, and received a nomination for Best Animated Short Film at the César Awards on January 28, 2026.

== Plot ==
God is Shy follows two passengers as they pass the time on a train by sketching their most intimate fears. The arrival of a third passenger disrupts their game, which takes a darker turn.

== Accolades ==
Year	Festivals	Award/Category	Status
2025	Cannes Film Festival	Leitz Cine Discovery Prize	Nominated
2025	Hamptons International Film Festival	Golden Starfish Award	Nominated
2025	Kaohsiung Film Festival	International Short Film Competition Golden Fireball Award	Won
2026	Annecy International Animation Film Festival	Best Animated Short Film Jury Award	Won
2026	Annecy International Animation Film Festival	Best Animated Short Film Audience Award	Won
2026	Hong Kong International Film Festival	Best Short Film	Won
2026	César Awards	Best Animated Short Film	Nominated
2026	Clermont-Ferrand International Short Film Festival	Grand Prix Lab Competition	Won
