= Teona Strugar Mitevska =

Macedonian film director and screenwriter

- Теона Стругар Митевска
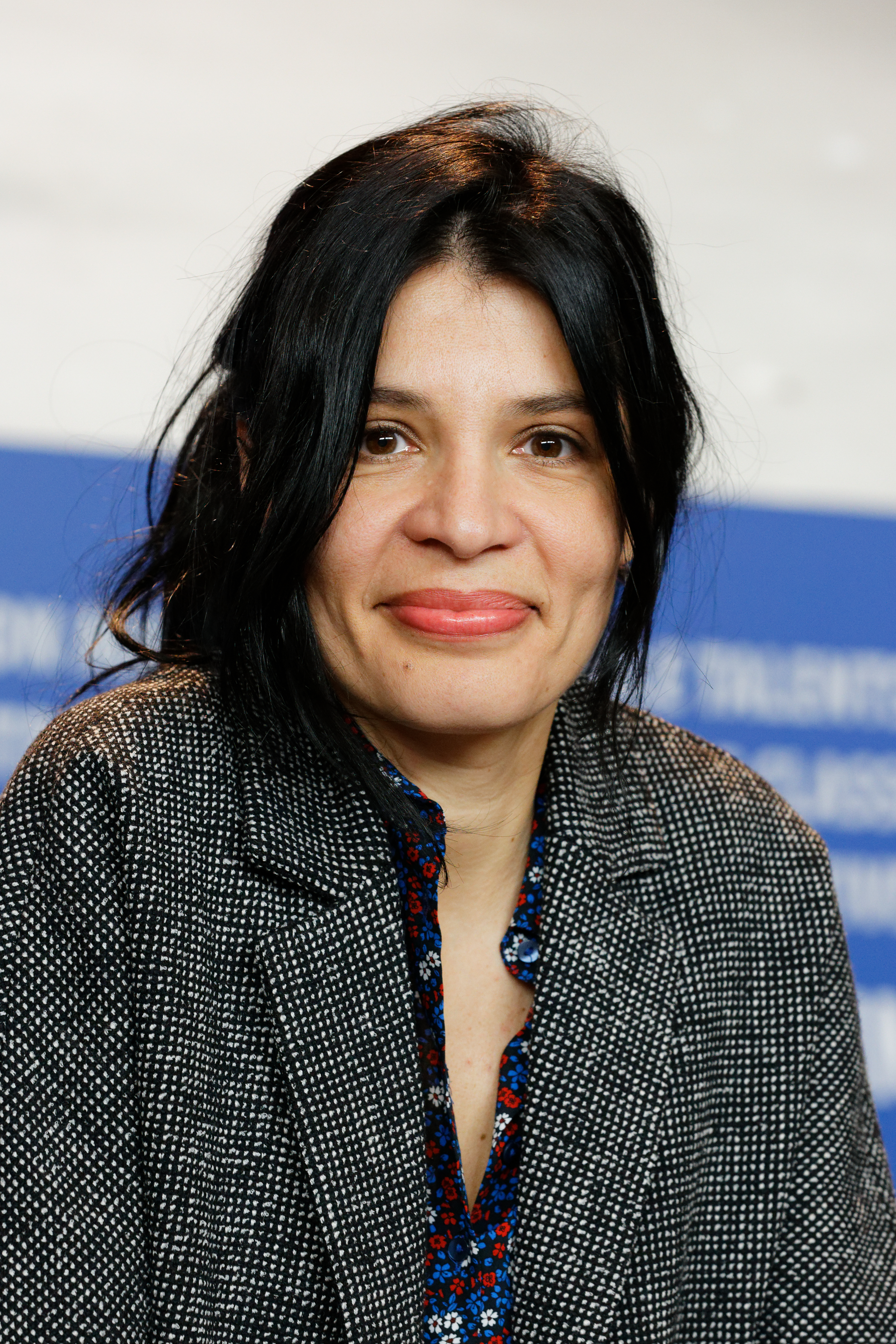
- Born: March 14, 1974 (age 52); Skopje, North Macedonia
- Occupations: Film director; screenwriter
- Years active: 2001-present

Teona Strugar Mitevska (born 1974 in Skopje) is a Macedonian film director and screenwriter.

== Career ==
In 2001, Teona Strugar Mitevska made her directorial debut with the short film Veta, which won the Special Jury Prize at the 51st Berlin International Film Festival. Her first feature film How I Killed a Saint was premiered at the International Film Festival Rotterdam in 2004. Set in Macedonia during the 2001 civil conflict involving the country's ethnic Albanian minority, the film explores the crisis through the perspective of two troubled siblings. Viola (played by Labina Mitevska, the director's sister) returns to her family in Skopje after studying in the United States. Her younger brother Kokan (Milan Tocinovski-Sako) becomes engaged with a group of radical nationalists. The movies is shot in a voyeuristic style that avoids close-ups.

In 2008, Teona Strugar Mitevska directed I Am from Titov Veles, screened at over 80 festivals around the world and won nearly 20 international awards.

In 2019, her film God Exists, Her Name Is Petrunija, won the LUX Prize.

== Filmography ==
=== Feature films ===
Year	English title	Original title	Notes
2004	How I Killed a Saint	Како убив светец	
2007	I Am From Titov Veles	Jas sum od Titov Veles	
2012	The Woman Who Brushed Off Her Tears		
2017	When the Day Had No Name	Кога денот немаше име	
2019	God Exists, Her Name Is Petrunija	Господ постои, името ѝ е Петрунија	
2022	The Happiest Man in the World	Најсреќниот човек на светот	
2025	Mother		
2026	Skateboarding Is Not for Girls	Skejtanjeto ne e za devojcinja	Writer only

=== Short films ===
- 2001: Veta
