= Beldocs =

International documentary film festival

Beldocs International Documentary Film Festival
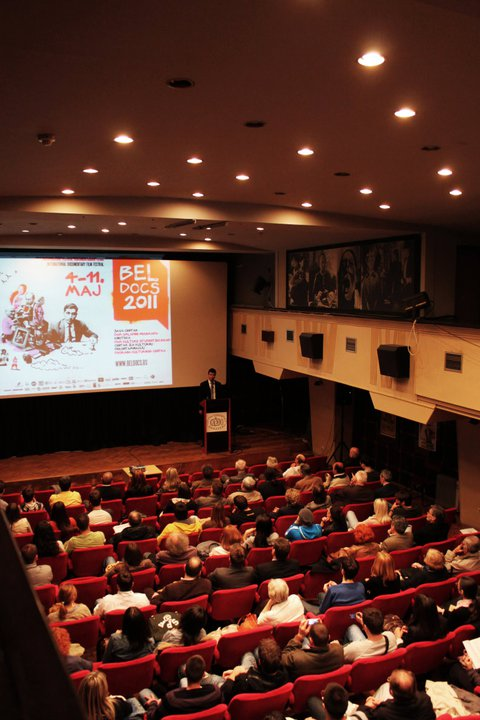
- The premiere of Boris Malagurski's "The Weight of Chains" at the festival in 2011.
- Location: Belgrade, Serbia
- Language: International
- Website: https://www.beldocs.rs/

Beldocs is an international documentary film festival held in Belgrade, Serbia.

Established in 2008, the festival consists of four competition programs (Serbian, International, Best Short and Teen), featuring over one hundred films, dozens of world and regional premiers, two retrospectives and a "Country in Focus" program. It takes place every year in the month of May.

In 2024, Beldocs was held in the Belgrade Youth Center, the Ilija M. Kolarac Endowment's Art Cinema, the Yugoslav Film Archive, Cineplexx Ušće, the Vlada Divljan Cultural Center and the Belgrade Cultural Center. It featured the largest number of films to date.
