= Sandra Wollner =

Austrian film director and screenwriter

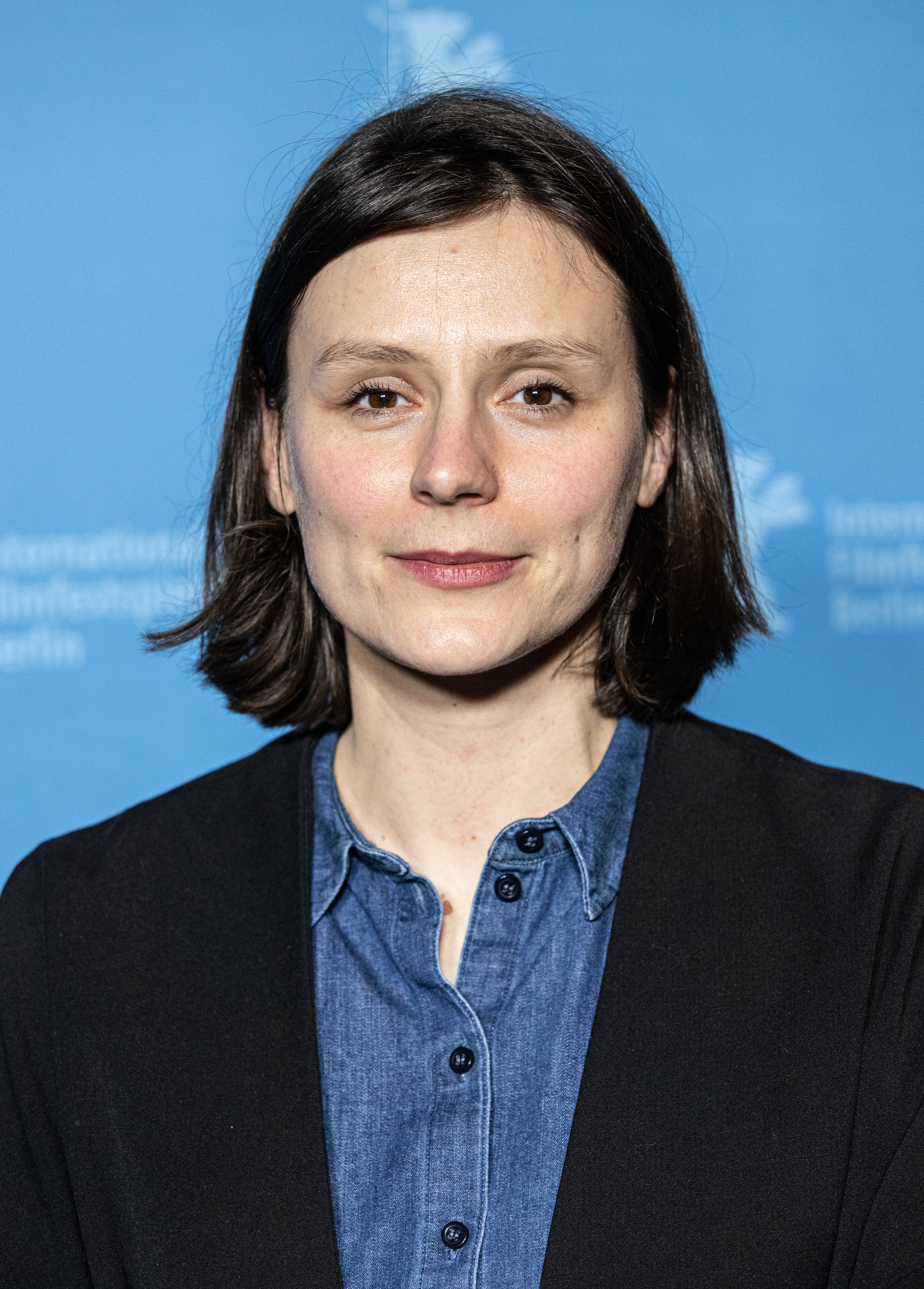
- Wollner at the 70th Berlin International Film Festival in 2020
- Born: 1983 (age 42–43); Leoben, Austria
- Occupations: Film director; screenwriter

Sandra Wollner (born 1983) is an Austrian film director and screenwriter. She made her feature directorial debut with The Impossible Picture (2016), and also directed and co-wrote The Trouble with Being Born (2020).

== Career ==
In 2012, Wollner began studying documentary filmmaking at the Film Academy Baden-Württemberg. She has directed several short films, and directed her first feature film, The Impossible Picture (2016), while still a student at the Film Academy Baden-Württemberg. The Impossible Picture garnered a number of awards, including the German Film Critics' Award in 2019.

Wollner directed and co-wrote The Trouble with Being Born, which premiered at the 70th Berlin International Film Festival in 2020, as part of the festival's Encounters section. The film received the Special Jury Award in that section.

In 2026, her film Everytime had its world premiere at the 79th Cannes Film Festival in the Un Certain Regard section, where it won the section's top prize.

== Filmography ==
Year	English Title	Original Title	Notes
2016	The Impossible Picture	Das unmögliche Bild	
2020	The Trouble with Being Born		
2026	Everytime		
