= 99th Academy Awards =

Award ceremony for films of 2026

- Date: March 14, 2027
- Site: Dolby Theatre, Hollywood, Los Angeles, California, U.S.
- Hosted by: Conan O'Brien
- Produced by: Raj Kapoor; Katy Mullan

TV in the United States
- Network: Broadcast: ABC; Streaming: Hulu

The 99th Academy Awards ceremony, presented by the Academy of Motion Picture Arts and Sciences (AMPAS), are scheduled to take place March 14, 2027, at the Dolby Theatre in Hollywood, Los Angeles. During the gala, the AMPAS will present Academy Awards (commonly referred to as the Oscars) in 24 categories, honoring films released in 2026. Conan O'Brien will host for the third straight year.

In related events, the Academy held its 17th Governors Awards ceremony at the Ray Dolby Ballroom of the Ovation Hollywood complex in Hollywood on November 15, 2026.

== Key dates ==
Upcoming dates leading up to the 99th Academy Awards
Date	Event
December 7, 2026	Preliminary voting begins
December 11, 2026	Preliminary voting ends
December 15, 2026	Shortlists announced
January 11, 2027	Nominations voting begins
January 15, 2027	Nominations voting ends
January 21, 2027	Nominations announced
February 25, 2027	Final voting begins
March 4, 2027	Final voting ends
March 14, 2027	Ceremony

== Governors Awards ==
The Academy presented its Governors Awards on November 15, 2026, during which the following awards were presented:

=== Academy Honorary Awards ===
- Glenn Close – "throughout her extraordinary body of work, Glenn Close's unparalleled emotional range has brought to life some of the most complex characters in cinema".
- Floyd Norman – "the legendary animator who has broken barriers and inspired generations of artists over his remarkable career".
- Ridley Scott – "a true visionary whose decades-long legacy has left an immeasurable impact on global cinema and culture".

=== Irving G. Thalberg Memorial Award ===
- Christine Vachon and Pamela Koffler – who "play a central role in American independent cinema, championing bold, ambitious and distinctive storytelling".

== Ceremony information ==
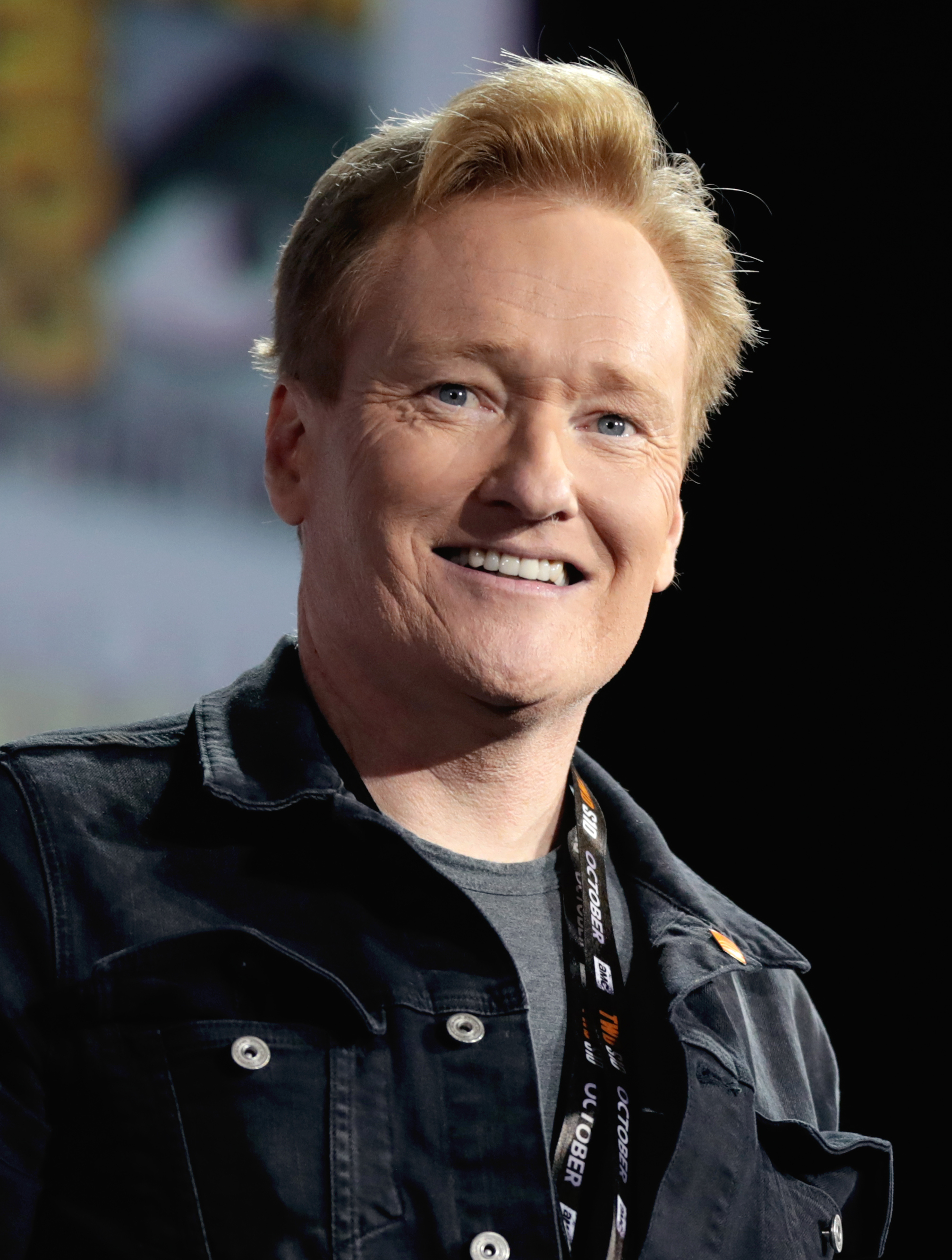
Conan O'Brien will host for the third consecutive year.

On May 12, 2026, it was announced that Raj Kapoor and Katy Mullan would return as executive producers for the fourth year in a row, and that Conan O'Brien would return as host for the third year in a row. In a joint statement, AMPAS CEO Bill Kramer and president Lynette Howell Taylor stated that "[Kapoor and Mullan] are an incredible team and have produced such captivating, entertaining and heartfelt shows over the last two years. We are so grateful for their ongoing partnership as we honor our global film community — and we look forward to Conan superbly leading the celebration with his brilliance and humor."

=== Rule and eligibility changes ===
On May 1, 2026, the Academy announced several major rule changes taking effect for the 99th ceremony:

- Eligibility for Best International Feature Film will be expanded to also include non-English-language films that win top jury awards at the Berlin (Golden Bear), Busan (Best Film Award), Cannes (Palme d'Or), Sundance (World Cinema Grand Jury Prize), Toronto (Platform Prize), and Venice (Golden Lion) film festivals, in addition to submissions made to the Academy's international film committee by individual countries. The changes resolve historic shortcomings in the nomination criteria for the category, including the "one-country-one-film" rule (which, due to varying factors, does not always guarantee that a critically-acclaimed film from a particular country will serve as its submission), and cases where films have been ignored (especially in countries such as China, Russia, and Iran) or submitted via co-producing countries due to the political views of their content or production staff.
  - Due to this change, the films themselves will be formally credited as recipients, rather than the submitting country; the director will continue to accept the award on behalf of the winning film's creative team. If the winning film is a national submission, the submitting country will continue to receive a statuette and inscription on its behalf as before.
- In alignment with other categories such as Best Director, an individual actor may now hold multiple nominations in a single acting category for their performances in different films, rather than only receiving a nomination for the performance that received the most votes.
- Eligibility rules for the acting and writing categories now explicitly prohibit the use of generative artificial intelligence, with writing categories restricting eligibility to works of human authorship, and acting categories requiring roles to be held by a billed cast member and "demonstrably performed by humans with their consent".

== See also ==
- List of submissions to the 99th Academy Awards for Best Animated Feature
- List of submissions to the 99th Academy Awards for Best Documentary Feature
- List of submissions to the 99th Academy Awards for Best International Feature Film
