= 49th Daytime Creative Arts & Lifestyle Emmy Awards =

- Date: June 18, 2022
- Location: Pasadena Convention Center, Pasadena, California, U.S.
- Presented by: National Academy of Television Arts and Sciences
- Most awards: The Kelly Clarkson Show (5)
- Most nominations: The Young and the Restless (12)

The 49th Annual Daytime Creative Arts Emmy Awards, were presented by the National Academy of Television Arts and Sciences (NATAS), honoring the best in U.S. daytime television programming in 2021. The winners were revealed on June 18, 2022, at the Pasadena Convention Center in Pasadena, California, while the nominations were announced alongside the main ceremony categories on May 5, 2022.

In December 2021, the Academy of Television Arts & Sciences (ATAS) and the National Academy of Television Arts and Sciences (NATAS) announced a major realignment of the Emmy Award ceremonies, among them was the creation of the Children's & Family Emmy Awards, rewarding children's programming and animation, hence, these categories will no longer be a part of the Daytime Creative Arts Award.

American home improvement media brand This Old House received the Lifetime Achievement Award.

== Winners and nominees ==
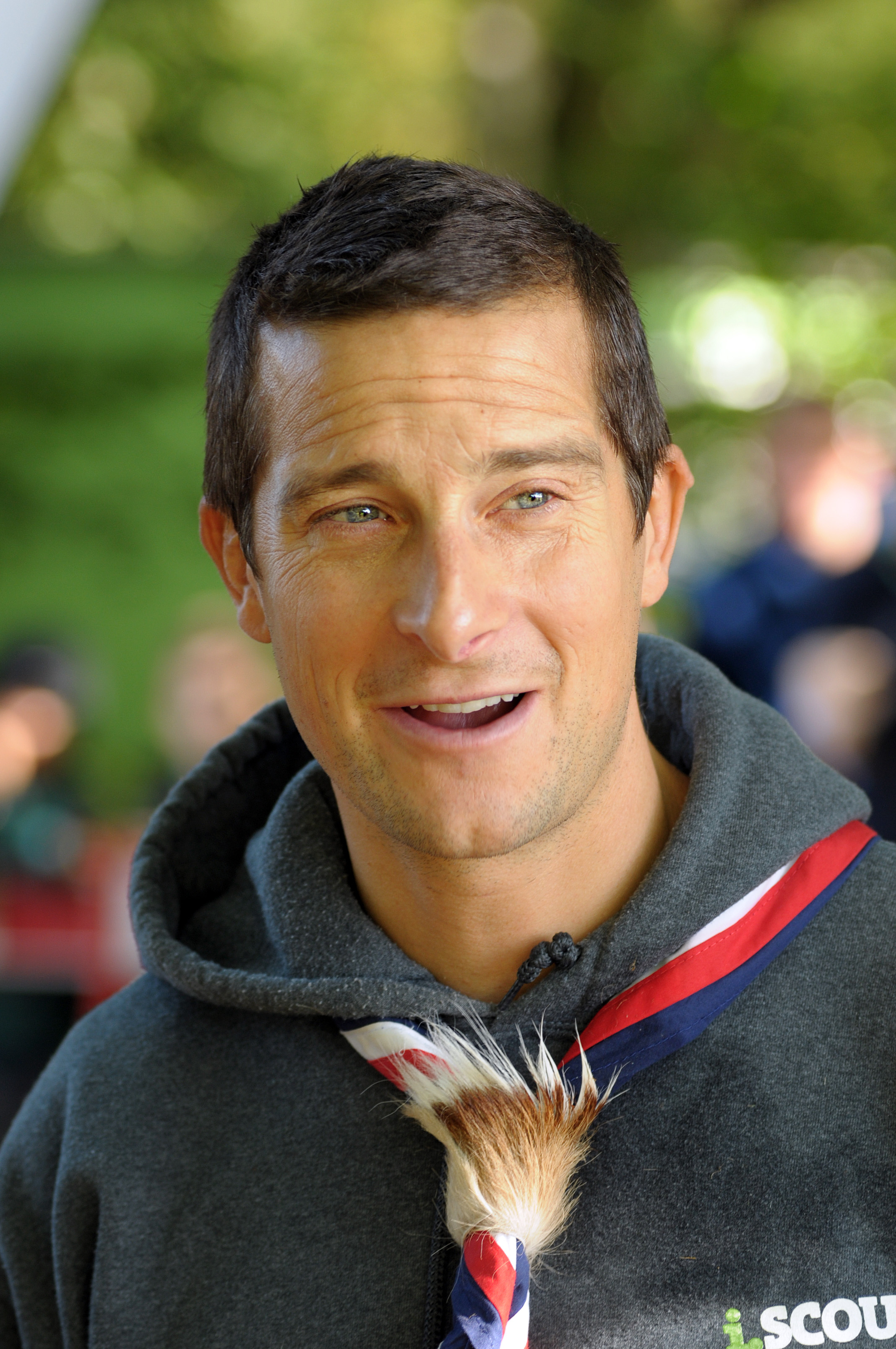
Bear Grylls, Outstanding Daytime Program Host winner

The nominations for both the 49th Daytime Emmy Awards and the 49th Daytime Creative Arts & Lifestyle Emmy Awards were announced on May 5, 2022. Winners are listed first, highlighted in boldface, and indicated with a double dagger (‡).

=== Programming ===
Programming
**Outstanding Culinary Series**: **Barefoot Contessa: Modern Comfort Food (Food Network)**‡; Counter Space (Vice TV); Guy's Ranch Kitchen (Food Network); Mary McCartney Serves It Up (Discovery+); Valerie's Home Cooking (Food Network)	**Outstanding Lifestyle Series**: **Sparking Joy with Marie Kondo (Netflix)**‡; For the Love of Kitchens (Magnolia Network); Growing Floret (Magnolia Network); Legacy List with Matt Paxton (PBS); Small Business Revolution (Hulu); Super Soul Sunday (OWN)
**Outstanding Travel, Adventure and Nature Program**: **Penguin Town (Netflix)**‡; Dogs (Netflix); Guy! Hawaiian Style (Discovery+); Samantha Brown's Places to Love (PBS); Uncharted Adventure (The Weather Channel Television Network)	**Outstanding Instructional and How-To Program**: **Home Work (Magnolia Network)**‡; Dream Home Makeover (Netflix); Issa Rae Teaches Creating Outside the Lines (MasterClass); Ringo Starr Teaches Drumming & Creative Collaboration (MasterClass); This Old House (PBS/Roku)
**Outstanding Arts and Popular Culture Program**: **First Film (Netflix)**‡; Articulate with Jim Cotter (PBS); If These Walls Could Rock (AXS TV); Lifetime and The Hollywood Reporter Present Women in Entertainment: The Next Generation (Lifetime); Music's Greatest Mysteries (AXS TV); One Symphony, Two Orchestras (PBS); Power On: The Story of Xbox (YouTube.com)	**Outstanding Daytime Special**: **Shelter Me: Soul Awakened (PBS)**‡; 20th Anniversary Commemoration of 9/11 (ABC/CBS/NBC/CNN/MSNBC/FOX/Multiple Networks); 95th Annual Macy's Thanksgiving Day Parade (NBC); Dark Shadows and Beyond: The Jonathan Frid Story (Apple TV); Recipe for Change (YouTube Originals)
**Outstanding Short Form Daytime Program**: **Cornerstones: Founding Voices of the Black Church (PBS)**‡; 9 Months with Courteney Cox (Facebook Watch); Hunger Interrupted (YouTube.com); The Juneteenth Menu (Food Network Digital); On the Rise: Legacy (Eater)	**Outstanding Interactive Media for a Daytime Program**: **You vs. Wild: Out Cold (Netflix)**‡; Headspace: Unwind Your Mind (Netflix)
**Outstanding Daytime Promotional Announcement**: **Entertainment Tonight: "Treat Yourself" (Syndicated)**‡; The Drew Barrymore Show: "MORE Barry-more" (Syndicated); Dr. Phil: "Crossroads" (Syndicated)

=== Crafts ===
Crafts
**Outstanding Art Direction/Set Decoration/Scenic Design**: **The Kelly Clarkson Show – James Pearse Connelly, David Eckert, Kevin Grace (Syndicated)**‡; The Ellen DeGeneres Show – Kristen Adams, Vanessa Wilkey Escobar, Kristyn Ingle, Roxanna Suarez (Syndicated); Tamron Hall – Seth Easter, Catherine McKenney, Meg Dohmlo, Diann Duthie (Syndicated); The View – Mark Erbaugh (ABC); The Young and the Restless – David Hoffmann, Jennifer Savala, Jennifer Haybach, Justine Mercado, Maria Dirolf, Raquel Tarbet (CBS)	**Outstanding Casting**: **The Young and the Restless – Nancy Nayor, Greg Salmon (CBS)**‡; Days of Our Lives: Beyond Salem – Marnie Saitta, Bob Lambert (NBC/Peacock); Dogs – Francine Dauw, Matt Shelley (Netflix); General Hospital – Mark Teschner, Lisa Snedeker Booth (ABC); Start Up – Jenny Feterovich (PBS)
**Outstanding Cinematography**: **Penguin Town – Alexander Sletten-Lead, Falk Eggert, Dale Hancock, Boris Von Schoenebeck, Russell Bergh, Greg Nelson (Netflix)**‡; Culture Quest – Ian Levasseur (PBS); Growing Floret – Jamie Francis, Jason Greene, Megan Eleanor Clark, Chris Janjic, Rob Finch, Chris Benzakein, Skip Armstrong (Magnolia Network); In Our Hands: The Battle for Jerusalem – Haim Asias (CBN); Shelter Me: Soul Awakened – Brian Pratt (PBS)	**Outstanding Costume Design/Styling**: **The Drew Barrymore Show – Lee Harris (Syndicated)**‡; General Hospital – Shawn Reeves, William H Hoffman Jr., Julianna Bolles Morrison, Maki Chaudhuri, Alice Volonino, Nicole Nagy, Nichole Nelson, Margaret Lousen, Christine Shahverdian (ABC); Nick Cannon – Katja Cahill, Tracey Moore-Cruz, Juliet Ouyoung, Aric Johnson (Syndicated); The Young and the Restless – David Zyla, Craig Aspden, Scott Burkhart, Juliet Huerta, Tony Lorito, Andreea Moldovan, Polina Roytman-Purcell, Laura Tiefer, Kay Wataguchi (CBS)
**Outstanding Daytime Program Host**: **Bear Grylls – You vs. Wild: Out Cold (Netflix)**‡; Gary Bredow – Start Up (PBS); Samantha Brown – Samantha Brown's Places to Love (PBS); Jeff Corwin – Wildlife Nation (Syndicated); Bianca Alexander, Michael Alexander – Conscious Living (PBS); Kevin O'Connor – This Old House (PBS/Roku); Patton Oswalt – Penguin Town (Netflix)	**Outstanding Hairstyling**: **Red Table Talk: The Estefans – Georgina Del Pino, William Isaac Mesa (Facebook Watch)**‡; The Bold and the Beautiful – Lisa Long, Danielle Spencer, Lauren Salas, Stephanie Paugh (CBS); The Real – Roberta Gardener Rogers, Noogie Thai, Ray Dodson, Robear Landeros (Syndicated); Red Table Talk – Neeko Abriol (Facebook Watch); The Talk – Angela Stevens, Vickie Mynes, Nicole Walpert (CBS); The View – Derick Monroe, Dora Smagler, Rosa Amoedo, Matthew Yates, Joedson Gomes (ABC)
**Outstanding Directing Team for a Single Camera Daytime Non-Fiction Program**: **Shelter Me: Soul Awakened – Steven Latham, Conrad Stanley (PBS)**‡; Cat People – Don Argott, Sheena M. Joyce (Netflix); Fresh, Fried & Crispy – Tim Duffy, Matthew Hobin (Netflix); The Minimalists: Less Is Now – Matt D'Avella (Netflix); Samantha Brown's Places to Love – Sylvia Caminer, Michael Indjeian (PBS); Wildlife Nation – Glenn Louis Evans, Luke Grossaint (Syndicated)	**Outstanding Directing Team for a Multiple Camera Daytime Non-Fiction Program**: **95th Annual Macy's Thanksgiving Day Parade – Ron de Moraes (NBC)**‡; Disney Parks Magical Christmas Day Parade– Sam Wrench (ABC); The Kelly Clarkson Show – Joe Terry, Diana Horn, Chris Hines, Ran Lowe (Syndicated); The Good Road – Andy Duensing (PBS); The View – Sarah de la O, John Keegan, Janean Elkins, Craig Viechec, Christopher Wayne, Dawn DiCicco, Rob Bruce Baron, Paul Tarascio (ABC)
**Outstanding Single Camera Editing**: **Power On: The Story of Xbox – Justin Fay, Eric Frith, Brian Giberson, Heather Abell, Cy Christiansen, Chris King (YouTube.com)**‡; Cat People – Michael Mees, Ruben Sebban (Netflix); Fresh, Fried & Crispy – Jason Gallagher, Bryan Kregg, John Leone, Uma Sanasaryan, Jesse Fisher, Jeff Thurlow, Dajana Mitchell (Netflix); Penguin Town – Kevin Chapados, John Freeburn (Netflix); Shelter Me: Soul Awakened – Conrad Stanley (PBS)	**Outstanding Multiple Camera Editing**: **The Kelly Clarkson Show – Justin Curran, Stas Lipovetskiy, Kliff Svatos, Sam Goldfein, Casey O'Brien (Syndicated)**‡; Articulate with Jim Cotter – Mark Miller, Tom Contarino, Ryan Savage, Christine Walden (PBS); The Bold and the Beautiful – Anthony Pascarelli, Marc Beruti, Bob Tan (CBS); The Good Road – Andy Duensing (PBS); Today's Homeowner with Danny Lipford – Brad Rodgers, Scott Gardner (Syndicated)
**Outstanding Music Direction and Composition**: **Cat People – Tyler Strickland (Netflix)**‡; The Kelly Clarkson Show – Jason Halbert (Syndicated); Penguin Town – Lenny Williams, Chris Biondo (Netflix); Shelter Me: Soul Awakened – Andrew Gross (PBS); Wildlife Nation – Evan Frankfort (Syndicated)	**Outstanding Original Song**: **The Young and the Restless – "Grateful for it All" by Gaye Tolan Hatfield, Brad Hatfield, Jeff Meegan (CBS)**‡; The Young and the Restless – "Next to You" by Brad Hatfield, Cait Fairbanks (CBS); Talks With Mama Tina – "Talks With Mama Tina Theme Song" by Beyoncé (Facebook Watch)
**Outstanding Lighting Direction**: **The Kelly Clarkson Show – Darren Langer (Syndicated)**‡; Jeopardy! – Jeffrey M. Engel (Syndicated); Red Table Talk – George Maxwell, Eric Foster (Facebook Watch); The View – James Gallagher (ABC); Wheel of Fortune – Jeffrey M. Engel, William McLachlan (Syndicated); The Young and the Restless – William Roberts, Ed Burgess (CBS)	**Outstanding Technical Team, Camera Work, Video**: **The Kelly Clarkson Show – Tom Henson, Dick Mort, Dean Andersen, Richard Pitpit, Eric Taylor, Drew Jansen, Ralph Bolton, Wade Bobbit (Syndicated)**‡; Disney Parks Magical Christmas Day Parade – Travis Hays, Melissa Lynch, John Atkinson, Tom Hildreth, Chris Ferguson, Nat Havholm, Jonny Harkins, Scott Acosta, Ryan Dean, Dave Eastwood, Jorge Ferris, Michael Gorczynski, Daniel Hagouel, Helena Jackson, Dee Nichols (ABC); Jeopardy! – Lucinda Owens Margolis, Mike Tribble, Ray Reynolds, Steve Simmons, L. David Irete, Diane Farrell, Jeff Messenger (Syndicated); The View – Rene Butler, Michael Danisi, Nick Davis, Rob Feder, Gary Jelaso, Manuel Gutierrez, Douglas Schneider, Andrew Capuano, David Dainoff, Anthony Ioannou, Hardy Kluender, Donato DePasquale, John Kokinis (ABC); The Young and the Restless – Steve Hoorn, Andrew Clark, Luis Godinez Jr., William Looper, William "Bill" Scott, Roberto Bosio, Thomas Luth (CBS)
**Outstanding Make Up**: **The Real – Motoko Honjo Clayton, Julie Jules, Marie-Flore Beaubien, Arianna Jimenez (Syndicated)**‡; General Hospital – Luiza Adzhiyan, Alexandra Fleck, Jacklyn Quackenbush, Victoria Vesy, Karen Simon (ABC); Red Table Talk – Leanne Hirsh, Steven Aturo (Facebook Watch); Tamron Hall – Jessica Smalls (Syndicated); The View – Rebecca Borman, Lynette Broom, Karen Dupiche, Veronica Ibarra (ABC)	**Outstanding Special Effects Costumes, Makeup and Hairstyling**: **The Drew Barrymore Show – Matthew Kilgore, Lee Harris, Daniel Howell, Toni Coburn, Robin Fredriksz, Lauren Gulino, Louis Zakarian (Syndicated)**‡; The View – Sam Hill, Nicolas Putvinski, Fran Taylor, Ashley Alderfer-Kaufman, Derick Monroe, Dora Smagler, Joedson Gomes, Matthew Yates, Rebecca Borman, Karen Dupiche, Lynette Broom, Veronica Ibarra, Kyle Krueger (ABC)
**Outstanding Live Sound Mixing and Sound Editing**: **The Kelly Clarkson Show – James Slanger, Bob Lewis, Eddie Marquez, Robert Venable, Danny Cruz, Jennifer Vannoy-Rounsaville, Jeff Hickman, Kevin Shannon (Syndicated)**‡; Days of Our Lives – Kevin Church, Nick Kleissas, Marko Fox, Harry Young, Stu Rudolph, Lugh Powers, Jenée Muyeau, Michael Flamingo, Joseph Lumer (NBC); Family Feud – Dirk Sciarrotta, Jeff Frickman, Hugh Harrer, Logan Patton, Tom Boisseau, Jennifer Vannoy-Rounsaville, Jefferson Samuel, Otto Svoboda, Tom Evans (Syndicated); General Hospital – Alex Layne, Gary Ellis, Paul Glass, Dave MacLeod, Jimmy Chang, Thomas Byrne (ABC); The Price Is Right – Henry Muehlhausen, Brian Rushing, Robbi Sutherland, Pete Mallard, Nancy Perry, Joshua Gardner, Frankie Le Nguyen, Jennifer Fah-Vayhinger, La-Aja J. Hernandez, Nicole M. Katz, Doug Schneider, Mathew Van Lannin (CBS)	**Outstanding Sound Mixing and Sound Editing**: **Penguin Town – Mark Haskins, Brian Cunneff, Chris Martin (Netflix)**‡; Car Masters: Rust to Riches – Jeremy Habig, Michael Budzik, John Reese (Netflix); Disney Parks Magical Christmas Day Parade – Shane O'Connor, Brian Rachko, Jacob Smith (ABC); Fresh, Fried & Crispy – Dean Gaveau, Andy Snavley, Jae Kim (Netflix); You vs. Wild: Out Cold – Mark Owen, Justin Lenoir, Nick Cox, Josh Banach, Martin Schloemer (Netflix)
**Outstanding Main Title and Graphic Design**: **Headspace: Guide to Meditation – Drew Takashi, Ben Pearce, Carmen Perez, Jake Cook, Jack Holmes, Jim Cascarina, Jonathan Gallagher, Leon Nikoo, Nik Maund, Ryan Wintle, Simon Brooke, Tomas Koza, Tony Comley, Chris Hall (Netflix)**‡; Cat People – Curt Cooper, Andrew Johnston, Tatiana Grezeszak, Sean Kasa, Curt Cooper, Sean Kasa (Netflix); Headspace: Unwind Your Mind – Tyler Hoehne, Caroline Pay, Chris Hall, Tony Comley, Carmen Perez, Ben Pearce, Jake Cook, Aaron Diamond, Simon Brooke, Jim Cascarina, Nik Maund, Nico Cagnini (Netflix); Home Work – Candis Meredith, Peter Franks, Tony Caiza, Kristen Colle, Joel Petrie, Brant Hansen, Michael McCray, Mathew Knegt, Jordan Wall (Magnolia Network); The View – Sarah de la O, Alan Ives, Michael Vamosy, Andrew Maercklein, Craig Viechec, Thomas Papesca, Amy Caspare, Kristen Cunningham, Halli Rosin, Mike Cahill, Brian Castleforte (ABC)	**Outstanding Writing Team for a Daytime Non-Fiction Series**: **The Ellen DeGeneres Show – Alison Balian, Gil Rief, Lauren Pomerantz, Troy Thomas, Jamie Brunton, Rick Mitchell, Micheal Tiberi, Grace Anaclerio, Brian Kiley, Ellen DeGeneres, Bente Engelstoft, Shannon Joy Rodgers, Adam Yenser, Lauren Pomerantz (Syndicated)**‡; Articulate with Jim Cotter – Jim Cotter, Matthew Hoisch, Paula Butler, Gabrielle Bing, Tori Marchiony, Pamela Whyte (PBS); The Drew Barrymore Show – Chelsea White, Cristina Kinon, Liz Koe (Syndicated); Start Up – Gary Bredow (PBS); Wildlife Nation – Amy Lambert, Barrett Thomas, Aaron Bauer (Syndicated)
