= First Hand Films =

Swiss film company

- Type: Private
- Industry: Film industry
- Founded: 1998
- Founder: Esther van Messel
- Headquarters: Zurich, Switzerland
- Area served: Switzerland
- Website: www.firsthandfilms.com

First Hand Films is a Swiss independent film production, sales agency and theatrical distribution company based in Zurich, Switzerland. Founded in 1998 by Esther van Messel, the company is known for its work with international documentaries and selected fiction projects, representing films to distributors, platforms, broadcasters and festivals worldwide.

As a theatrical distributor, First Hand Films releases fiction and non-fiction films across Switzerland, operating in the country's three main language regions.

== History ==
First Hand Films was founded in Zurich in 1998 by Esther van Messel as a documentary sales and distribution company. In its early years, the company established itself in the international non-fiction market through worldwide sales acquisitions, including early titles such as The Long Way Home, which later received the Academy Award for Best Documentary Feature.

During the 2000s, First Hand Films became active in representing documentaries premiering at major international festivals. In 2008, the company handled international sales for Corridor #8 and Brides of Allah, both presented in the International Forum at the Berlin International Film Festival.

In 2009, First Hand Films handled international sales for Burma VJ - Reporting from a Closed Country, an IDFA-winning documentary directed by Anders Østergaard. The film later received an Academy Awards nomination for Best Documentary Feature at the 83rd Academy Awards. In the same year, the company launched Filmsbazaar.com, an online platform designed to connect independent filmmakers with buyers and financiers. In 2011, First Hand Films expanded into in-house production with the creation of Kiss the Frog Films GmbH, focusing on original documentary and transmedia projects alongside co-productions and executive production work.

In 2019, First Hand Films had entered a strategic partnership with Austrian investor Hansjürgen Schmölzer of BSX Austria, who acquired a minority stake in the company. The investment supported the company in international documentary sales, production, and co-production activities. In 2020, First Hand Films launched the First Hand Fund in partnership with BSX Graz to support larger documentary, series and feature productions with social and political themes.

Through the 2010s and 2020s, the company continued to handle international sales for documentaries premiering at festivals including IDFA, Venice, Berlinale, CPH:DOX and Hot Docs. Titles represented by the company during this period included Ambulance (2016), Hobbyhorse Revolution (2017), A-ha: The Movie (2020), Lost Boys (2021), Trust Me (2021), Name of the Game (2021), 300 Trillion – The Debt Trap (2022), Life is Beautiful (2023), Life Is Not a Competition But I Am Winning (2023), Call Me Dancer (2023), Writing Hawa (2024), House of Hope (2025), Elvira Notari: Beyond Silence (2025) and Yo (Love Is a Rebellious Bird) (2026).

== Filmography ==
Year	Title	Director(s)	Notes
1998	Photographer	Dariusz Jablonski	IDFA Best Documentary
2003	Arna’s Children	Juliano Mer Khamis	Tribeca Best Documentary
2008	Brides of Allah	Natalie Assouline	Berlinale Forum; FIPRESCI Award
2009	Burma VJ	Anders Østergaard	Academy Award nominee; IDFA winner
2011	The Guantanamo Trap	Thomas Wallner	Hot Docs Special Jury Prize
2012	Harry Dean Stanton: Partly Fiction	Sophie Huber	Venice official selection
2013	Trespassing Bergman	Hynek Pallas, Jane Magnusson	Venice Classics premiere
2014	24 Hours Jerusalem	Volker Heise	German TV Award winner
2015	Nice People	Karin af Klintberg, Anders Helgeson	CPH:DOX Best of Fest
2016	Presenting Princess Shaw	Ido Haar	IDFA premiere
2016	Ambulance	Mohamed Jabaly	Sheffield Doc/Fest premiere
2017	Hobbyhorse Revolution	Selma Vilhunen	Hot Docs premiere; Tampere awards
2018	Primas	Laura Bari	IDFA premiere
2019	The Reformist – A Female Imam	Marie Skovgaard	CPH:DOX premiere
2020	Town of Glory	Dmitry Bogolyubov	
2021	A-ha: The Movie	Thomas Robsahm, Aslaug Holm	Tribeca premiere; Worldwide theatrical release
2021	Trust Me	Emil Trier	CPH:DOX premiere
2021	Lost Boys	Joonas Neuvonen, Sadri Cetinkaya	CPH:DOX premiere
2022	300 Trillion – The Debt Trap	Rudolph Herzog	ARTE/ARD co-production
2022	Polish Prayers	Hanka Nobis	DOC NYC premiere; Zurich Film Award (Best Director)
2022	The Illusion of Abundance	Erika Gonzalez Ramirez, Matthieu Lietaert	
2023	Life Is Beautiful	Mohamed Jabaly	IDFA premiere; Winner Best Directing Award
2023	Life Is Not a Competition, But I’m Winning	Julia Fuhr Mann	Venice Critics’ Week premiere
2023	Our Land, Our Freedom	Meena Nanji, Zippy Kimundu	IDFA premiere; BBC Africa Eye acquisition
2023	A Way to B	Jos de Putter, Clara van Gool	IDFA premiere
2024	Writing Hawa	Najiba Noori, Rasul Noori	IDFA premiere
2024	Women Conquer the Art Business	Sarah Rathgeb	
2024	Devi	Subina Shrestha	Hot Docs premiere
2025	Abortion in the Holy Land	Efrat Shalom Danon	Haifa Film Festival premiere
2025	Elvira Notari: Beyond Silence	Valerio Ciriaci	Venice Film Festival premiere
2025	House of Hope	Marjolein Busstra	IDFA premiere
2025	Palestine Comedy Club	Alaa ‘Regash’ Aliabdallah, Charlotte Knowles	DOC NYC premiere
2025	The Beauty of the Donkey	Dea Gjinovci	Zurich Film Festival premiere
2025	The Srebrenica Tape	Chiara Sambuchi	Movies that Matter premiere
2025	Who Is Still Alive	Nicolas Wadimoff	Swiss entry for the Best International Feature Film at 99th Academy Awards
2026	Yo (Love Is a Rebellious Bird)	Anna Fitch, Banker White	Berlinale premiere; Silver Bear Winner
2026	Don't Ask Me If I Killed	Helena Maksyom	Winner of Main Prize of Docu/Ukraine Competition at DocuDays UA
