= Yo (Love Is a Rebellious Bird) =

American documentary film

- Directed by: Anna Fitch; Banker White
- Produced by: Sara Dosa; Hannah Roodman; Banker White; Anna Fitch
- Starring: Yolanda Shea; Anna Fitch; Dylan White
- Cinematography: Banker White
- Edited by: Banker White
- Music by: Tyler Strickland
- Production company: Mirabel Pictures
- Release date: February 20, 2026 (Berlinale)
- Running time: 78 minutes
- Country: United States
- Language: English

Yo (Love Is a Rebellious Bird) is a 2026 American documentary film directed by Anna Fitch and Banker White. It follows the aftermath of the death of Fitch's close friend Yolanda Shea, also known as Yo.

The film had its world premiere at the main competition of the 76th Berlin International Film Festival on February 20, 2026, where it won the Silver Bear for Outstanding Artistic Contribution.

== Plot ==
After the death of her close friend Yo, filmmaker Anna Fitch spends ten years constructing a meticulous one-third-scale replica of Yo’s home - large enough for her to step inside. Within this space, a puppet version of Yo is found, allowing Anna to revisit their unlikely, decades-long friendship that began when Yo was 73 and Anna was 24. Blending intimate footage from Yo’s final year with miniature sets and visual recreations of Yo’s life stories, the film explores how memory, art, and grief intertwine, and how creative reconstruction becomes a way to keep love and connection alive across time.

== Cast ==
- Yolanda Shea
- Anna Fitch
- Dylan White

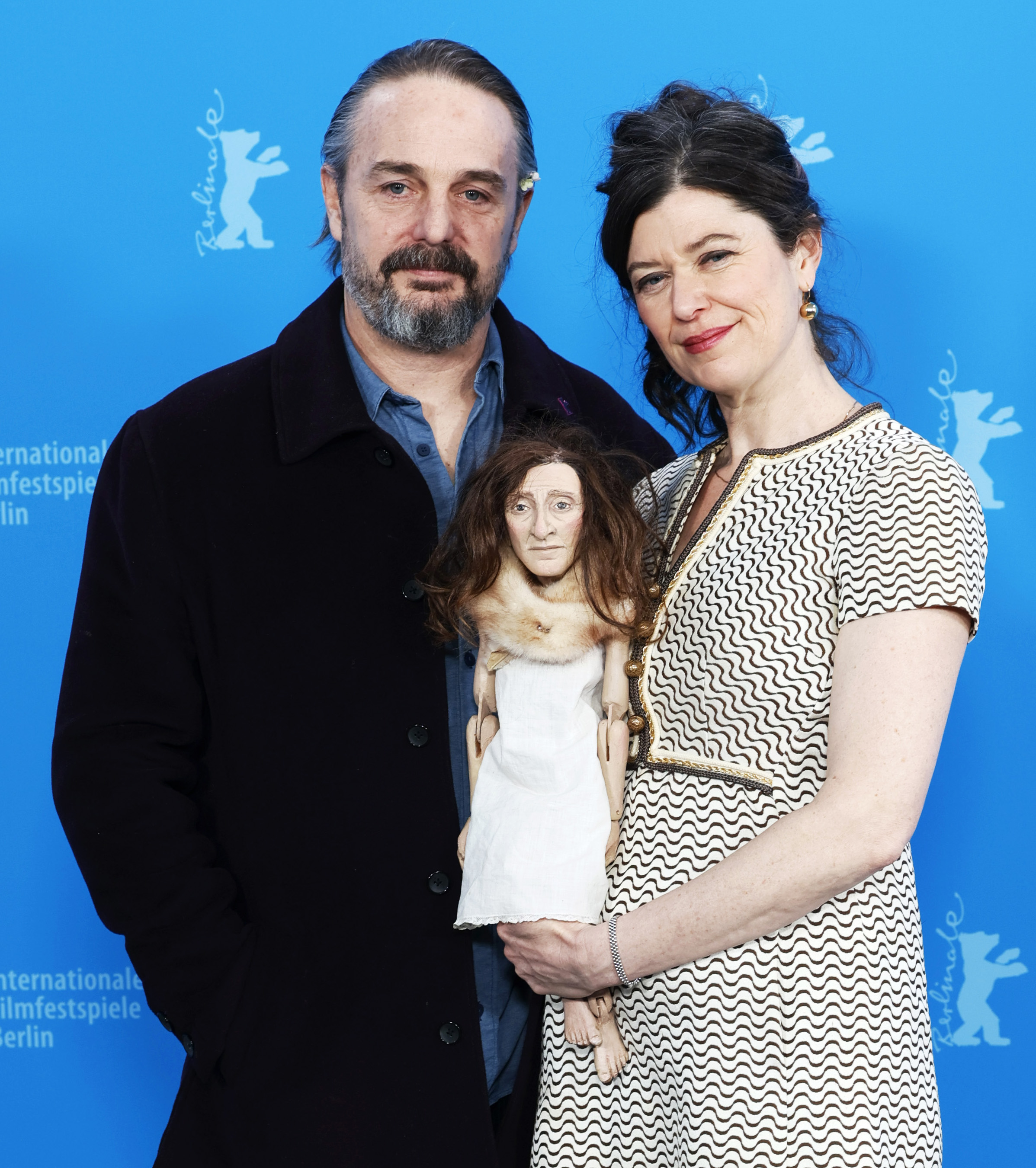
Banker White and Anna Fitch at the 76th Berlin International Film Festival

== Production ==
Filming began during Yo's lifetime, when directors Anna Fitch and Banker White documented their visits with her. After Yo's death, Fitch was unable to revisit the footage for several years and instead began creating physical reconstructions of Yo's environment. These artistic reconstructions eventually became central to the film’s narrative and visual language.

The film is produced by Mirabel Pictures and international sales is handled by First Hand Films. The project continues a collaboration between Fitch, White, and First Hand Films that began with the 2018 documentary Survivors.

== Release ==
It premiered at the 76th Berlin International Film Festival on February 20, 2026.

== Accolades ==
Ceremony	Award	Recipient	Result	Ref.
76th Berlin International Film Festival	Silver Bear for Outstanding Artistic Contribution	Anna Fitch and Banker White	Won	
17ème Festival international du film de la Roche sur Yon (France)	Prix spécial du jury international	Anna Fitch and Banker White	Won	
