= Cow by Bear =

American pop-up steakhouse

Restaurant information
- Established: 2011; 15 years ago
- Head chef: Chef Bear
- Location: San Diego, United States
- Seating capacity: 10-14
- Reservations: Yes
- Website: www.cowbybear.com

Cow by Bear is an American pop-up steakhouse founded in San Diego by an anonymous chef dressed as a Kodiak bear.

== History ==
Originally based in San Diego, Cow by Bear was founded in 2011 by an anonymous chef known only as "Chef Bear", who began cooking out of their own apartment. After six years in San Diego, Chef Bear launched Cow by Bear Seattle in partnership with head chef Osa Bear. Chef Bear also commissioned Chef Aleppo Bear to operate a Cow by Bear restaurant in Savannah, Georgia. In May 2019, Chef Bear, together with Osa Bear and Lil' Osito Bear, returned to San Diego.

== Description ==
According to the restaurant's official website, Chef Bear is a Kodiak bear who "was kidnapped at a young age and put into a traveling circus", during which time he "learned to both talk and walk upright", before embarking on his culinary career. However, Chef Bear does not verbally communicate with his patrons, preferring to use either body language or e-mail. The restaurant is only open from Thursday to Saturday during dinner hours and each of its temporary locations has a single table that can accommodate around ten to fourteen diners; diners will only receive the restaurant's location by e-mail a day before their reservations. The restaurant serves a five-course tasting menu that changes each month; Chef Bear describes his cuisine as "fine dining, wild animal style". Dishes served include a 50-day dry-aged ribeye steak, smoked salmon, and lamb ragout.

== Reception ==
Writing for Modern Luxury San Diego, Keri Bridgwater called Cow by Bear the "most eclectic supper club" in San Diego. Reviewing the restaurant for the Netflix food reality television series Fresh, Fried and Crispy (2021), Daym Drops commented, "I might need all my steaks done by a bear."
