= Messel (surname) =

Messel is a German surname. It derives from the German municipality of Messel in the district of Darmstadt-Dieburg in Hesse near Frankfurt am Main.

Notable people with the surname include:

- Alfred Messel (1853–1909), German architect
- Esther van Messel (born 1965), Dutch-Swiss film producer
- Harry Messel (1922–2015), Canadian-born Australian physicist
- Maud Messel (1875–1960) British artist and horticulturalist
- Oliver Messel (1904–1978), English artist and stage designer
- Syvert Tobiassen Messel (1897–1978), Norwegian politician
