= Legends of the Hidden Temple =

American game show

- Genre: Game show
- Created by: David G. Stanley; Scott A. Stone; Stephen Brown
- Directed by: Charles Ciup (Nickelodeon, season 1); Glenn Weiss (Nickelodeon, seasons 2–3); Ramy Romany (The CW)
- Starring: Kirk Fogg; Cristela Alonzo
- Voices of: Dee Bradley Baker as "Olmec"
- Announcer: Dee Bradley Baker
- Composers: David G. Stanley & Scott A. Stone (credited on-air as "The Music Machine") (1993–95); Eimear Noone & Craig Stuart Garfinkle (2021–22)
- Country of origin: United States
- Original language: English
- No. of seasons: 3 (Nickelodeon); 1 (The CW)
- No. of episodes: 120 (Nickelodeon); 13 (The CW)

Production
- Executive producers: David G. Stanley (1993–95); Scott A. Stone; Marcus J. Fox (2021–22)
- Producers: David M. Greenfield (1995); Brennan Huntington (1995)
- Production locations: Nickelodeon Studios, Universal Studios Florida (1993–95); Simi Valley, California (2021–22)
- Running time: 22–24 minutes (Nickelodeon); 42 minutes (The CW)
- Production companies: Stone Stanley Productions (1993–95); Nickelodeon Productions; Stone & Company Entertainment (2021–22)

Original release
- Network: Nickelodeon
- Release: September 11, 1993 – November 24, 1995
- Network: The CW
- Release: October 10, 2021 – January 23, 2022

Legends of the Hidden Temple is an American action-adventure television game show that was produced from 1993 to 1995 on Nickelodeon. Created by David G. Stanley, Scott A. Stone, and Stephen Brown, the program features a fictitious temple, "filled with lost treasures protected by mysterious Mayan temple guards." Kirk Fogg is the show's host, while Dee Bradley Baker is both announcer and voice of a stone head named Olmec who "knows the secrets behind each of the treasures in his temple." Six teams (Red Jaguars, Blue Barracudas, Green Monkeys, Orange Iguanas, Purple Parrots, Silver Snakes) of two children (one boy and one girl) compete to retrieve one of the historical artifacts in the temple by performing physical stunts and answering questions based on history, mythology, and geography. Contestants trying out had to compete in several physical tasks, including rope climbing and running, as well as a written test. The majority of the contestants were picked from the surrounding Orlando, Florida, area.

A revival with adult contestants aired for a single season from October 2021 to January 2022 on The CW.

== Production ==
Legends of the Hidden Temple was produced by Stone Stanley Productions in association with Nickelodeon and was taped at Nickelodeon Studios at Universal Studios in Orlando, Florida. In 1995, Legends of the Hidden Temple won a CableACE award for Best Game Show Special or Series.

Legends of the Hidden Temple began airing on Nickelodeon on September 11, 1993. The show originally aired on weekends at 6:30 p.m. In that time slot, it increased the Nielsen rating from 1.5 to 2. Due to this success, the show began airing weekdays at 5:30 p.m. starting the week of February 14, 1994. The show was renewed for a forty-episode second season in February 1994. Auditions for new episodes took place on February 26 and 27, and production occurred from March 27 through April 17. Second-season episodes began airing June 6 of that year. A forty-episode third and final season was produced from February 17 to March 12, 1995, and began airing on July 3 of that year.

The show was originally conceived under the title Secrets of the Haunted House where monsters would jump out and frighten contestants while they try to complete challenges within the haunted house.

In 1996, the Orlando Business Journal reported that Nickelodeon was considering renewing Legends for a fourth season, but according to Scott Fishman, then vice president of production services at Nickelodeon, renewal was "not a sure bet" because Nickelodeon was considering three new game show pilots taped in Orlando. Production for the fourth season was stopped midyear before it could be released, signaling the cancellation of the season.

== Gameplay ==
Title card of Legends of the Hidden Temple

The set design of Legends of the Hidden Temple was based on the Indiana Jones movies, and Marianne Arneberg of the Orlando Sentinel described the program as "a combination of Jeopardy and Raiders of the Lost Ark." The set design has been described as Mayan. It included areas for different types of physical challenges: a broad but shallow pool of water (the moat), a set of steps (the Steps of Knowledge), and a large, two-and-a-half-floor vertical labyrinth (the "hidden temple"). At the temple's gate was a talking Olmec head simply named Olmec (voiced by Dee Bradley Baker). Olmec narrated the stories told in the steps of knowledge and temple game challenges (although in the first season, Fogg narrated the temple game challenges). Each episode centered on a particular legend regarding an artifact (real or fictional) from around the world that found its way to the temple. Some artifacts included "Lawrence of Arabia's Headdress", "The Electrified Key of Benjamin Franklin", "The Jewel-Encrusted Egg of Catherine the Great", and "The Broken Wing of Icarus." Olmec also serves as the basis for the logo. In addition to providing an artifact, the legend also was important to other aspects of the show: the Steps of Knowledge used questions based on the historical legend, and the theme of the temple games was also loosely based on the legend.

In each episode, six teams of two contestants began a three-round competition to determine which team earned the right to enter the temple. Each team was identified with a color and an animal, indicated on their uniform shirts: the Red Jaguars, Blue Barracudas, Green Monkeys, Orange Iguanas, Purple Parrots, and Silver Snakes.

=== Round 1: The Moat ===
In the first round of the show, the six teams attempted to cross a narrow swimming pool known as "the moat" in a prescribed manner. For example, in one episode, teams were required to swing out to a rope net in the middle of the moat, climb it, and then swim to the other side. All six teams attempted to get both members across according to the rules and push a button on a pedestal to ring a gong. The first four teams to cross the moat and ring their gongs advanced to the second round.

=== Round 2: The Steps of Knowledge ===
The four remaining teams stood on the topmost of the four levels of the Steps of Knowledge. Olmec began the round by telling the remaining teams the episode's legend of the featured artifact, which will become the theme for the remainder of the episode. The legend centered on an artifact that the winning team will search for in the final round. At the end of the legend, Olmec told the teams the room in which the artifact could be found. After finishing, he asked the teams a series of questions to test their memory. Each multiple-choice question had three possible answers. A team attempting to answer signaled by stomping on a buzzer on their step, causing the front of the step to illuminate (if Olmec was still in the middle of asking a question, he stopped talking immediately). A team who answered correctly moved down to the next level. If a team answered incorrectly or ran out of time (three seconds after being called upon), the other teams were given a chance to answer. The first two teams to answer three questions correctly and thereby reach the bottom level advanced to the next round.

=== Round 3: The Temple Games ===
The temple games featured the two remaining teams competing in three physical challenges to earn Pendants of Life which the winning team used in the final round. Several types of temple games were featured, with the episode's legend serving as a theme for each. Most temple games lasted for a maximum of 60 seconds but some were untimed. After each challenge, the winning team received some portion of a protective Pendant of Life. The first two challenges, pitting single members from each team against one another, were worth one-half of a pendant, while the final challenge, involving both contestants on both teams, was worth a full pendant. If a temple game ended in a tie, both teams received the pendant value of that game.

The team that earned the most pendants by the end of three temple games won the right to enter the temple. If the two teams earned the same number of pendants after the three temple games, the teams played a tiebreaker to determine who advanced to the temple. The teams stood behind a tiebreaker pedestal, and Fogg (since Season 2, Olmec) asked a tiebreaker question to determine the winner. The first team to hit the buzzer on top of their gong was given the chance to answer the question. A correct answer allowed the team to go to the temple. Originally, a team that buzzed in and gave an incorrect answer or ran out of time automatically lost, allowing the other team to advance to the temple by default. However, in Seasons 2 and 3, the other team was required to answer the question correctly to go to the temple.

=== Final Round: The Temple Run ===
A contestant assembles a three-piece statue in the Shrine of the Silver Monkey. When the statue is assembled correctly, the unlocked doors of the room open and the contestant can advance toward the artifact, indicated by the pink circle on the map at the bottom left.

In the final round, the winning team took the Pendants of Life that the contestants earned into the temple and attempted to retrieve the episode's artifact and bring it back out of the temple within a three-minute time limit. The team designated one member to enter the temple first; that team member carried one of the team's full pendants. The other team member held the remaining pendant, half pendant, or no pendant at all and stood by to enter if the first team member was taken out of the temple by a temple guard. Before starting, Olmec would explain the rooms in the temple and the necessary tasks in each room. During season 1, Fogg asked who would go first and explained about the temple guards and, if necessary, the extra half pendant. Beginning in season 2, Olmec himself explained these things.

A diagram of the layout of the temple

The temple consisted of twelve rooms, each with a specific theme (e.g., the Throne Room, the King's Storeroom, the Observatory, the Shrine of the Silver Monkey, the Heart Room, etc.). The rooms were connected to adjacent rooms by doorways, although some doors were locked, blocking a contestant's progress into the adjacent room; the pattern of locked and unlocked doors changed from episode to episode depending both on the temple layout and the artifact's location. The unlocked doors were closed at the start of the round, but they could be opened by completing a specific task or puzzle within each room. One room in the temple contained the themed artifact (as stated by Olmec before the Steps of Knowledge round). Three other designated rooms held temple guards (spotters in lavish Mayan sentinel costumes). If the winning team had exactly 1 1/2 pendants, the remaining half pendant was also placed in a room for the contestant with the half pendant to collect to make a full pendant. The extra half pendant, if needed, would either be hanging on the wall near a door or placed inside an object in a room (e.g., hidden inside a pot in the King's Storeroom). If the first player dropped their pendant, the second player could pick it up and either throw it back to their partner or use it if needed.

A contestant who encountered a temple guard was forced to give up a full pendant to continue. However, if the first contestant was caught without a pendant in his or her possession, he or she was taken out of the temple and the second contestant entered. In either case, the temple guard who captured the contestant was out of play and did not appear again in the room where the first contestant was captured. When the second contestant entered, any doors that the first contestant opened remained open. If the second contestant was caught without a full pendant, the run ended immediately. A player could enter a room with an unencountered temple guard on their way to the artifact and not get caught, usually if the room design makes it so that the guard can only capture the player if within reach (e.g. the Dark Forest is where one of the trees "could be inhabited by the spirit of a temple guard" which was signaled if the tree grabbed the player, but the player had to be within reach to trigger the tree).

The team had three minutes to retrieve the artifact and leave the temple with it. If either contestant grabbed the artifact, all remaining temple guards vanished and all locked doors in the temple instantly opened, allowing the contestant to escape unhindered. For entering the temple, the team automatically won a prize. If a team member picked up the artifact, the team won a more expensive prize as well. A team that retrieved the artifact and exited the temple with it before time ran out earned the grand prize and the other two prizes. Starting with season 2, the temple had an actual gate that Olmec would lower before the round started.

=== 2021 revival ===
The basic format remained the same as the Nickelodeon show, with the following changes:

- Each episode lasts a full hour rather than a half-hour.
- Each episode features four teams of adults, with same-gender teams allowed.
- Confessionals occur during the first three rounds.
- The first three teams to cross the moat advance to the Steps of Knowledge.
- The episode's featured legend is now told more extensively in separate parts before each round, instead of just before the Steps of Knowledge.
- There are two temple games, each played for a full pendant, and with both teammates playing. The two teams compete head-to-head in one game, while the other is a timed challenge, with the winner of the Steps of Knowledge having the choice of which team goes first. If the teams split the first two games, Olmec asks a single tiebreaker question for the final pendant.
- Olmec reveals the location of the artifact before the Temple Run instead of the Steps of Knowledge.
- The temple consists of 11 rooms instead of 12, and the rooms are much larger than the original.
- Temple guards often appear after the contestant finishes the room's objective, instead of right when the player enters the room.
- Teams have four minutes rather than three minutes to complete the Temple Run in a redesigned temple. The winning team receives $2,500 just for entering the temple, which is increased to $10,000 if they reach the artifact, and to $25,000 if they exit the temple before time expires.

== Reception ==
Writing for Entertainment Weekly, A.J. Jacobs listed Legends of the Hidden Temple among a series of imitators of American Gladiators, describing the concept as "Gladiators meets Young Indiana Jones Chronicles." Jacobs criticized the "Steps of Knowledge" round as filler, but concluded that "kids'll praise it to the moon." Legends won the award for best game show at the 16th Annual CableACE Awards in January 1995. The show also received nominations at the 17th and 18th Annual CableACE Awards in December 1995 and October 1996 but lost to The News Hole and Debt. Feminist author Susan Douglas, a Hampshire College professor of media and American studies, praised Legends of the Hidden Temple for being a "nonsexist and nonviolent" show.

== Broadcast history ==
New episodes of Legends of the Hidden Temple began airing on Nickelodeon on September 11, 1993, and continued to air until 1995. Reruns aired on the channel for an additional four years until February 28, 1999, when the program stopped airing on Nickelodeon, but returned in Spring 2007. However, on March 1, 1999, the show once again began airing in reruns on Nick GAS until that network became defunct on New Year's Eve 2007 (April 23, 2009 on Dish). Outside of its native country, Nickelodeon also included the show in a block of Nickelodeon programming that aired in 1999 on Zee TV. In March 2009, TV Week reported that David Stanley acquired the rights to several Stone-Stanley shows which included Legends of the Hidden Temple. The assignment was recorded in the copyright office on May 2, 2008. On October 7, 2011, the show aired on TeenNick as part of its The '90s Are All That block. The show has appeared on TeenNick sporadically since that time. As of 2024, the series currently airs on Pluto TV. On March 24, 2021, the complete series was added to Paramount+.

== Television film ==
In March 2016, Nickelodeon announced a TV film version of the game show was in production, with Isabela Moner, Colin Critchley, Jet Jurgensmeyer, and Daniel Cudmore starring in the film. The film was directed by Joe Menendez and written by Jonny Umansky, Zach Hyatt, and Alex J. Reid. It features elements of the original show, including Olmec, The Steps of Knowledge, and cameos from a green monkey, a red jaguar, and silver snakes, among others. Original host Kirk Fogg returned as a fictionalized version of himself and Dee Bradley Baker reprises his role as the voice of Olmec while Michael Benyaer portrays Olmec's human form.

== Revival ==
On December 16, 2019, it was announced that a revival with adult contestants would premiere in April 2020 on Quibi. Although casting for the reboot was announced on March 10, 2020, in a tweet by Quibi, movement on the production went silent and Quibi was shut down on December 1, 2020 because of Roku's acquisition. On May 7, 2021, a new casting call for the show went out to the public, contrary to rumors that production was cancelled. On May 11, 2021, the revival was ordered at broadcast network The CW, which is part-owned by what was then known as ViacomCBS (now as Paramount), the parent company of Nickelodeon. The show is hosted by Cristela Alonzo and premiered on October 10, 2021. The basic format—with the moat crossing, Steps of Knowledge, and Temple Games leading to the Temple Run—remains the same. On July 21, 2021, it was announced that Baker would reprise his role as Olmec. Fogg made guest appearances in four episodes, serving as a mentor in one of the temple rooms. Nick Borey and Josh Siniscalco were the only two contestants to appear on the revival that also competed on the original Nickelodeon run in the 1990s as kids. On June 3, 2022, the revival was cancelled.

== Merchandise ==
In 2017, Pressman released a Legends of the Hidden Temple board game. It was only available for about a year, and only sold (firsthand) at Target stores. As of mid-2018, it is no longer available from Target stores or their website.
