= Who Is Still Alive =

2025 Swiss documentary film

- International promotional poster
- French: Qui vit encore
- Directed by: Nicolas Wadimoff
- Screenplay by: Nicolas Wadimoff
- Produced by: Ketsia Stocker; Nicolas Wadimoff
- Starring: Adel Al Taweel; Haneen Harara; Eman Shannan; Mahmoud Jouda
- Cinematography: Leandro Monti; Camille Cottagnoud
- Edited by: Jean Reusser
- Music by: Dom La Nena
- Production companies: Akka Films; Easy Riders Films; Radio Télévision Suisse (RTS); SRG SSR; Philistine Films (PS)
- Distributed by: First Hand Films (Switzerland); Una Mattina Films (France)
- Release dates: 3 September 2025 (Venice); 14 October 2026 (France)
- Running time: 113 minutes
- Countries: Switzerland; France; Palestine
- Language: Arabic

Who Is Still Alive (French: Qui vit encore) is a 2025 documentary film written and directed by Nicolas Wadimoff. A co-production among Switzerland, France, and Palestine, it documents the voices of nine Palestinians from Gaza as they tell their stories of survival during the ongoing Gaza war.

The film had its world premiere in the Giornate degli Autori section of the 82nd Venice International Film Festival on 3 September 2025. It will be theatrically released in France by Una Mattina Films on 14 October 2026. It was also selected as the Swiss entry for the Best International Feature Film at the 99th Academy Awards.

== Summary ==
A map of Gaza is drawn in white paint on a black floor, showing its cities, camps, and neighborhoods. Inside these rough shapes, nine refugees who escaped the violence share their stories — their old lives, their forgotten dreams, the danger they faced, the ruins they walked through, and the loved ones they lost. Albeit their lives are crushed, yet they are not completely destroyed or forgotten. By telling their stories, the people in the film try to reconnect with who they are, to stop feeling like ghosts, and maybe, to feel alive again.

== Cast ==
- Adel Al Taweel
- Haneen Harara
- Eman Shannan
- Mahmoud Jouda
- Ghada Al Masri
- Jawdat Khoudary
- Hana Al Aiwa
- Feras Elshrafi
- Malak Khadra

== Release ==
Who Is Still Alive had its world premiere on 3 September 2025 at the 82nd Venice International Film Festival in Special Events of the Giornate degli Autori sidebar. Subsequently it was screened at the 49th São Paulo International Film Festival in October 2025. In January 2026, it competed for Grand Documentary Prize at the Festival International de Programmes Audiovisuels. It had its Greek Premiere at the Thessaloniki Documentary Festival on 9 March 2026. On 10 April 2026, it was screened at the International Istanbul Film Festival in Documentary Time. It was screened at the DOXA Documentary Film Festival on 5 May 2026 in the Justice Forum series. The film competed for Prix de Soleure at the Solothurn Film Festival and was screened on 22 January 2026.

The film had its Swiss Premiere at the Locarno Film Festival on 7 August 2026 in Swiss Panorama, where it competed for Prix du public.

It will be released in the French theatres on 14 October 2026 by Una Mattina Films, and on 1 December 2026 in the Middle East and North Africa by Front Row Filmed Entertainment. Watermelon Pictures will release the film in United States in Autumn of 2026.

== Reception ==
Vittoria Scarpa of Cineuropa reviewing the film at Giornate degli Autori Special Events, praised it writing, that the film becomes a brave, dignified act of "courage and resistance", calm, respectful, and focused "not on tears" but on giving back humanity to people whose lives have been crushed. Scarpa observed that the film is "like some form of group therapy", in which the people try to reconnect with themselves and their memories so they can claim their right to exist and stop feeling like ghosts.

== Accolades ==
Award / Film Festival	Date of ceremony	Category	Recipient(s)	Result	Ref(s)
Venice International Film Festival	6 September 2025	Cinema & Arts Award	Who Is Still Alive	Won	
Solothurn Film Festival	28 January 2026	Prix de Soleure	Who Is Still Alive	Won	
Swiss Film Awards	27 March 2026	Best Documentary	Who Is Still Alive	Nominated	

== See also ==
- List of Swiss submissions for the Academy Award for Best International Feature Film
- List of submissions to the 99th Academy Awards for Best International Feature Film
