= Lansana Mansaray =

Sierra Leonean filmmaker

- Born: Lansana Mansaray; 1988 (age 37–38); Freetown, Sierra Leone
- Other name: Barmmy Boy
- Occupations: Director, film producer, cinematographer, rapper
- Years active: 2010–present

Lansana Mansaray (born 1988), often known as Barmmy Boy, is a Sierra Leonean filmmaker. One of the most popular filmmakers in Sierra Leone cinema, Mansaray is best known for the critically acclaimed films Youth, Charity and Survivors. Apart from filmmaking, he is also a film producer, cinematographer and rapper.

== Personal life ==
He was born in 1992 in Freetown, Sierra Leone.

== Career ==
Mansaray is the founder and production manager of WeOwnTV at the Freetown Media Center. With WeOwnTV, he has collaborated for many organisations including: Defence for Children International, NOVA Studios (UK), British Council Sierra Leone, UNICEF Sierra Leone, Save the Children Sierra Leone, Well Woman Clinic and Hull UK City of Culture 2017.

In 2010, he directed his maiden film Youth. In the same year, he worked as the cinematographer for the film Charity. He continued to work as a cinematographer in coming years in the films; They Resisted (2011) and Disability is Inability.

Apart from them, he worked as the cinematographer in many award-winning international productions such as Decisions in 2011, Girl Rising in 2013, They Are We in 2014, and Meet the Africans: Many Rivers to Cross in 2013, where the latter won the Primetime Emmy Award. In 2014, he visited United Kingdom to meet some friends, however he was forced to extend his stay for five months due to Ebola outbreak in Sierra Leone.

In 2018, he directed the documentary film Survivors, which based on Ebola crisis. He was later nominated for the Emmy's Best Social Issue Documentary, where it became the first ever West African film to receive the accolade.

== Partial filmography ==
Year	Film	Role	Genre	Ref.
2008	Moving to the Beat	Actor: himself	Video documentary	
2010	Youth	Director	Short film	
2010	Charity	Director, additional photographer	Short film	
2011	They Resisted	Cinematographer	Documentary	
2011	Decisions	Cinematographer	Documentary	
2013	Girl Rising	Field producer	Documentary	
2013	Meet the Africans: Many Rivers to Cross	Cinematographer	Documentary	
2014	They Are We	Cinematographer	Documentary	
2018	Survivors	Director, producer, cinematographer	Documentary	
