= Best and Most Beautiful Things =

2016 documentary film directed by Garrett Zevgetis

- Directed by: Garrett Zevgetis
- Produced by: Ariana Garfinkel; Jeff Consiglio; Garrett Zevgetis; Jordan Salvatoriello
- Cinematography: Sarah Ginsburg; Jordan Salvatoriello
- Edited by: Jeff Consiglio; Sarah Ginsburg
- Music by: Tyler Strickland
- Production companies: Only Bright Productions; Beacon Street Films; Carriage House Pictures; VFRFilms
- Distributed by: First Run Features
- Release date: March 14, 2016 (SXSW 2016 Film Festival)
- Running time: 90 minutes
- Country: United States
- Language: English

Best and Most Beautiful Things is a 2016 American documentary film directed by Garrett Zevgetis and produced by Zevgetis, Ariana Garfinkel, Jeff Consiglio, and Jordan Salvatoriello. It follows Michelle Smith, a young woman transitioning into adulthood while dealing with the additional challenges associated with disability.

== Synopsis ==
The film explores the coming of age of an exuberant and precocious young blind woman, Michelle Smith, who identifies as being on the autism spectrum. As she tries various ways of finding her true self in a new world of adults, she struggles with family tensions and trying to keep a job. On a more personal level, she begins developing a sense of sexual identity through exploring aspects of fetishism.

== Critical reception ==
Neil Genzlinger of The New York Times selected the film as a Critics' Pick in December 1, 2016, calling the film "a remarkably forthright documentary" in which Ms. Smith makes "a difficult transition for someone with disabilities - the end of the schooling years, with their structure and relative safety."

== Awards ==
- Won Special Jury Award for Individuality of the Human Spirit at the 2016 Florida Film Festival
- Won Special Jury Prize for Best Documentary Feature at the 2016 Independent Film Festival of Boston
- Nominated for Jury Award for Best Documentary Feature at the 2016 South by Southwest Film Festival
