= The Genius of Marian =

2013 film by Banker White and Anna Fitch

The Genius Of Marian
- Directed by: Banker White; Anna Fitch
- Produced by: Anna Fitch; Shaleece Haas; Banker White
- Cinematography: Banker White
- Edited by: Don Bernier
- Music by: Tyler Strickland
- Production company: ZAP Zoetrope Aubry Productions
- Release date: April 18, 2013 (Tribeca Film Festival)
- Running time: 85 minutes
- Country: United States
- Language: English

The Genius of Marian is a 2013 American documentary that was directed by Banker White and his wife Anna Fitch. The film focuses on White's mother Pam, who was diagnosed with Alzheimer's disease. The film's title refers to a book that Pam had intended to write about her mother, Marian, who also had Alzheimer's.

The film had its world premiere on April 18, 2013 at the Tribeca Film Festival, and aired on PBS on September 8, 2014.

== Synopsis ==
The film documents the lives of both Pamela "Pam" Steel White and her mother, Marian Steele White. It follows Pam as she and her son Banker White go about their daily lives while discussing the life of Marian, an accomplished artist.

Marian attended the Trenton School of Industrial Arts and the Pennsylvania Academy of Fine Arts, after which point she traveled to Europe to further her studies, funded by winning the Charles Toppan Prize. Once she returned home to the United States she began studying and painting at the Albert C. Barnes Foundation. Marian was commissioned to paint various celebrities and sports figures such as Mohammed Ali, Mario Andretti, and Joe Namath and was a part of organizations such as the Guild of Boston Artists and the Rockport Art Association. She was diagnosed with Alzheimer's related dementia in the late 1990s and died on February 8, 2001, at the age of eighty-nine.

The film intersperses this with information about Pam, who held many careers throughout her life that included being a professional model, educator, and social worker. She expressed interest many times about writing a novel about her mother, but was unable to work on the book due to her being diagnosed with Alzheimer's. In lieu of the novel Pam and her son Banker White created the documentary to cover not only Marian's life but also Pam's.

== Reception ==
The Genius of Marian has received favorable reviews. John Anderson wrote in IndieWire that the film was "remarkable" and "a starkly intimate and revealing picture of woman at her most vulnerable". David Wiegand writes in the San Francisco Chronicle that you "can almost feel" the characters "in a figurative tug o' war" that he says may break your heart. In the Washingtonian, critic Douglas Bair describes the documentary as a "cohesive film" that has a "fluid and compellingly visual storyline". The Arts Fuse reviewed The Genius of Marian, stating that "While the film offers an intimate look at the family’s background, the bonds forged through its struggles, and a fair amount of information about Marian, the documentary does not supply the well-rounded picture of a traditional biographical narrative." The Villager gave a favorable review, praising a contrast made in the film between Pam in her youth and when she was suffering from Alzheimer's.

=== Awards ===
- Camden International Film Festival Harrell Award for Best Documentary Feature 2013
- Jury Award Best Feature Documentary Washington West Film Festival 2013
- Heartland Film Festival Documentary Feature winner 2013
- Audience Award Documentary Feature Personal Woods Hole Film Festival 2013
- 2014 Rosalinde Gilbert Innovations in Alzheimer's disease Caregiving Legacy Award
