= Silver Bear for Outstanding Artistic Contribution =

Award presented by the Berlin International Film Festival

- Silberner Bär/Herausragende künstlerische Leistung (German)
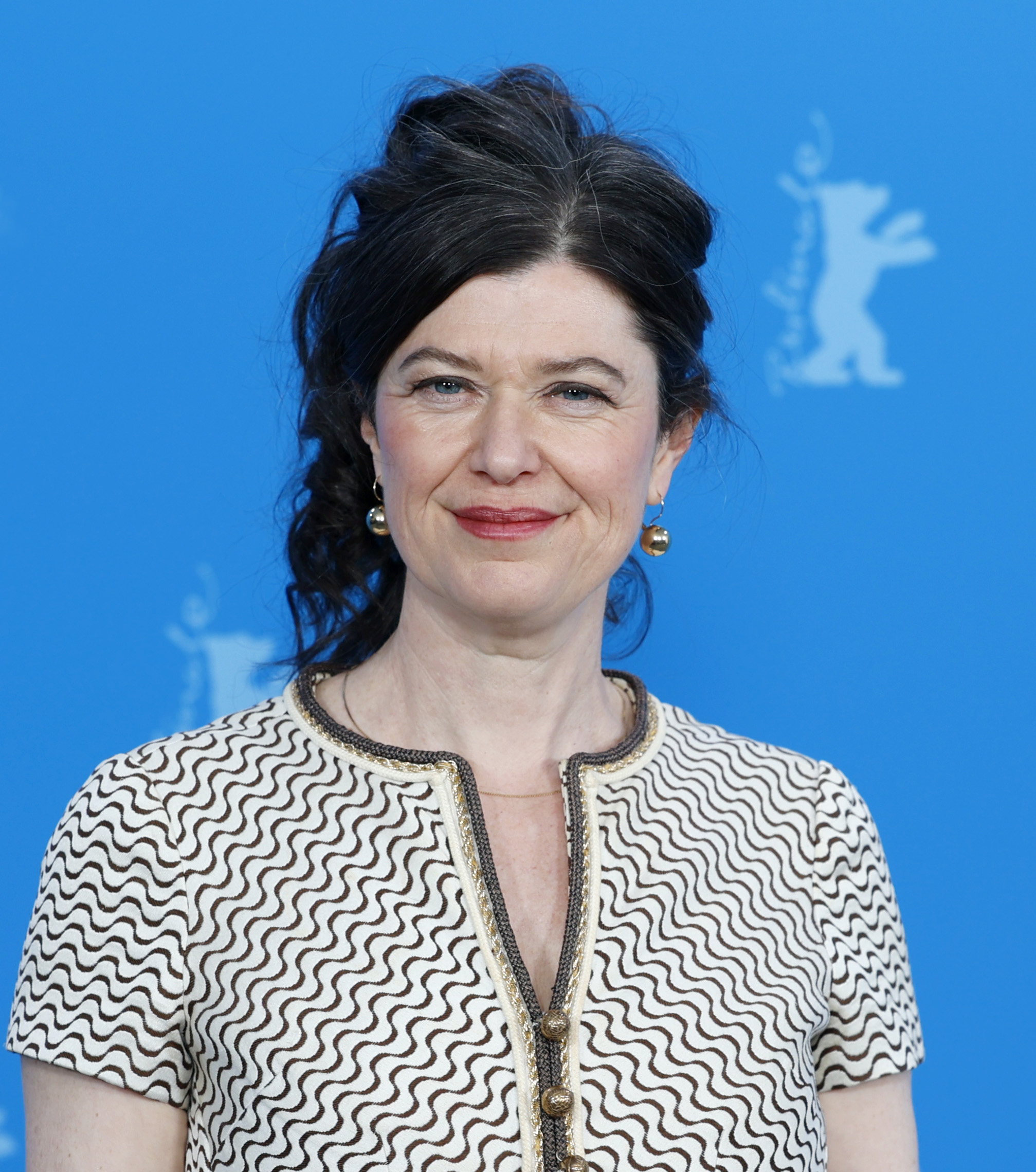
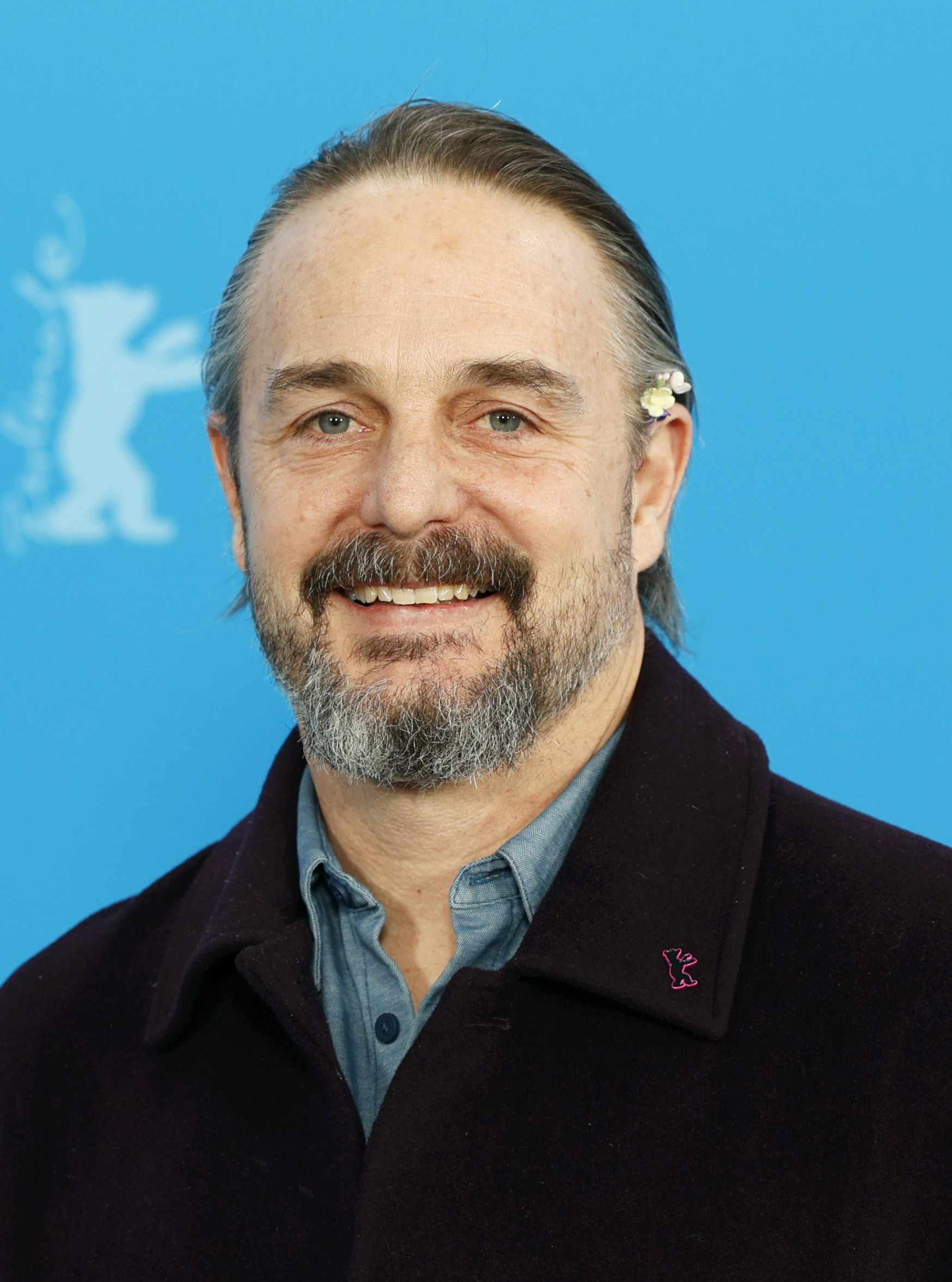
- 2026 recipients: Anna Fitch and Banker White
- Awarded for: Outstanding Artistic Contribution
- Country: Germany
- Presented by: Berlin International Film Festival
- First award: 1956
- Currently held by: Anna Fitch and Banker White; Yo (Love Is a Rebellious Bird) (2026)
- Website: www.berlinale.de

The Silver Bear for Outstanding Artistic Contribution (German: Silberner Bär für eine herausragende künstlerische Leistung) is the Berlin International Film Festival's award for achievement in crafting. Usually awarded to crew members, such as cinematographers, production designers, costume designers or editors.

== Winners ==
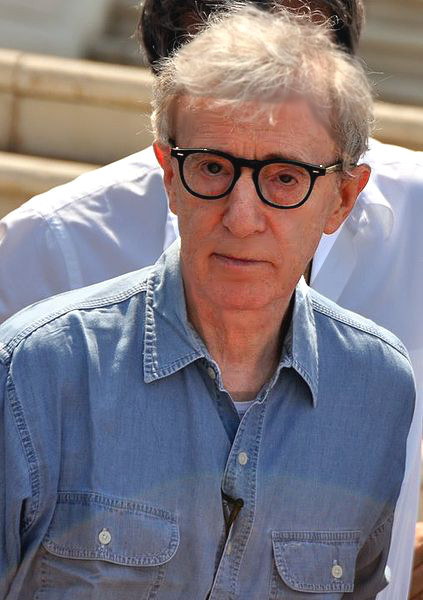
Woody Allen won for Love and Death (1975).

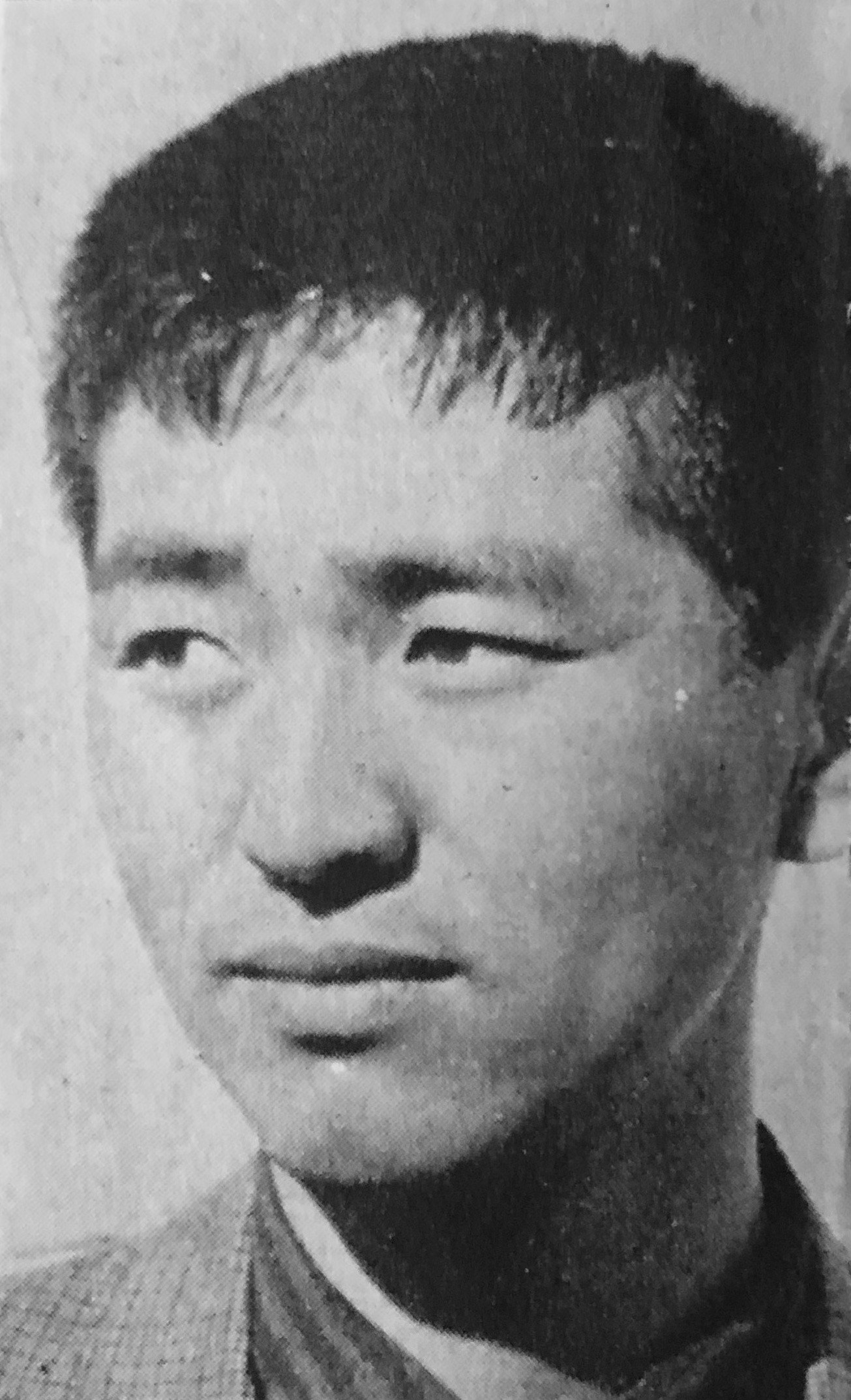
Masahiro Shinoda won for Gonza the Spearman (1986).

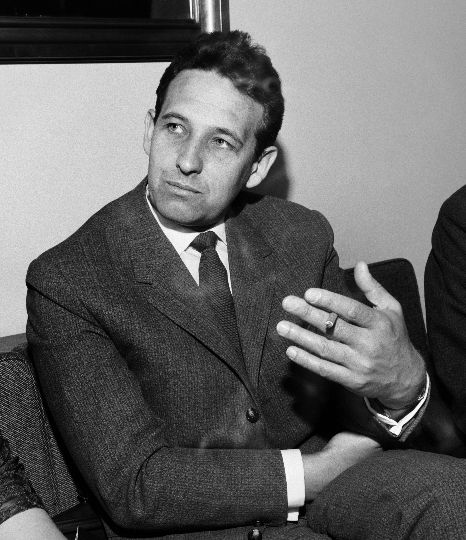
Andrzej Wajda won for Holy Week (1996).

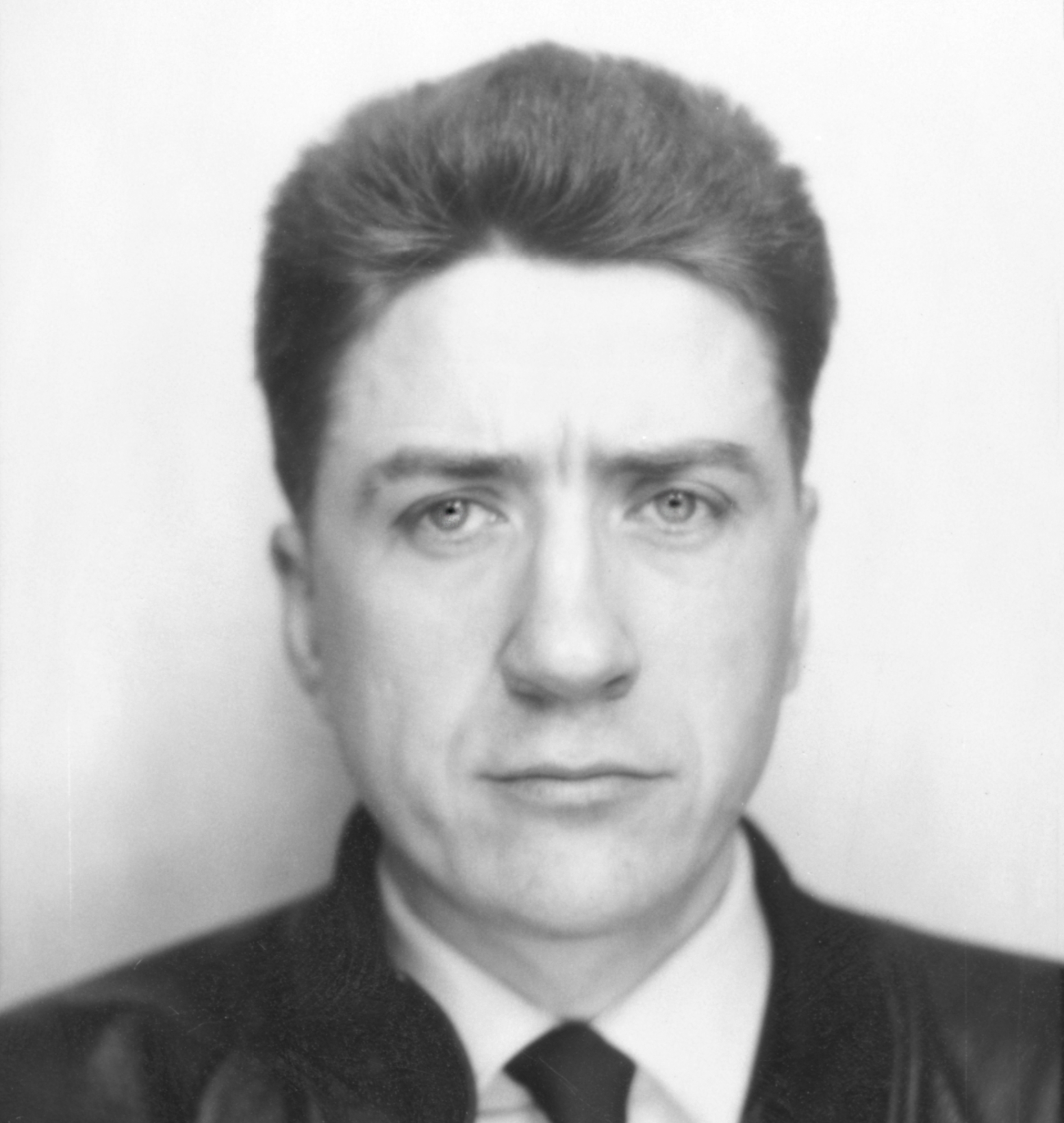
Alain Resnais won for Same Old Song (1998).

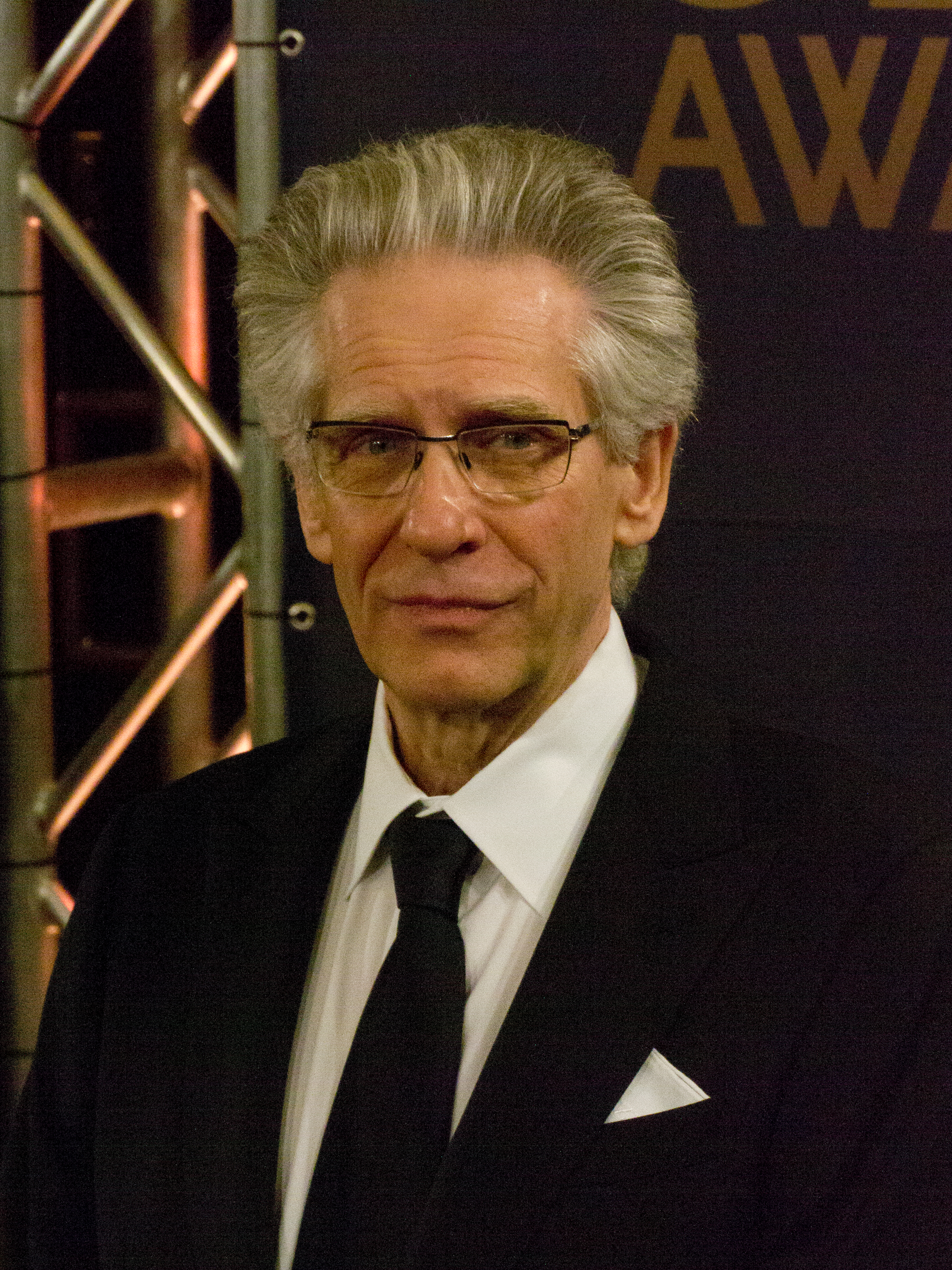
David Cronenberg won for Existenz (1999).

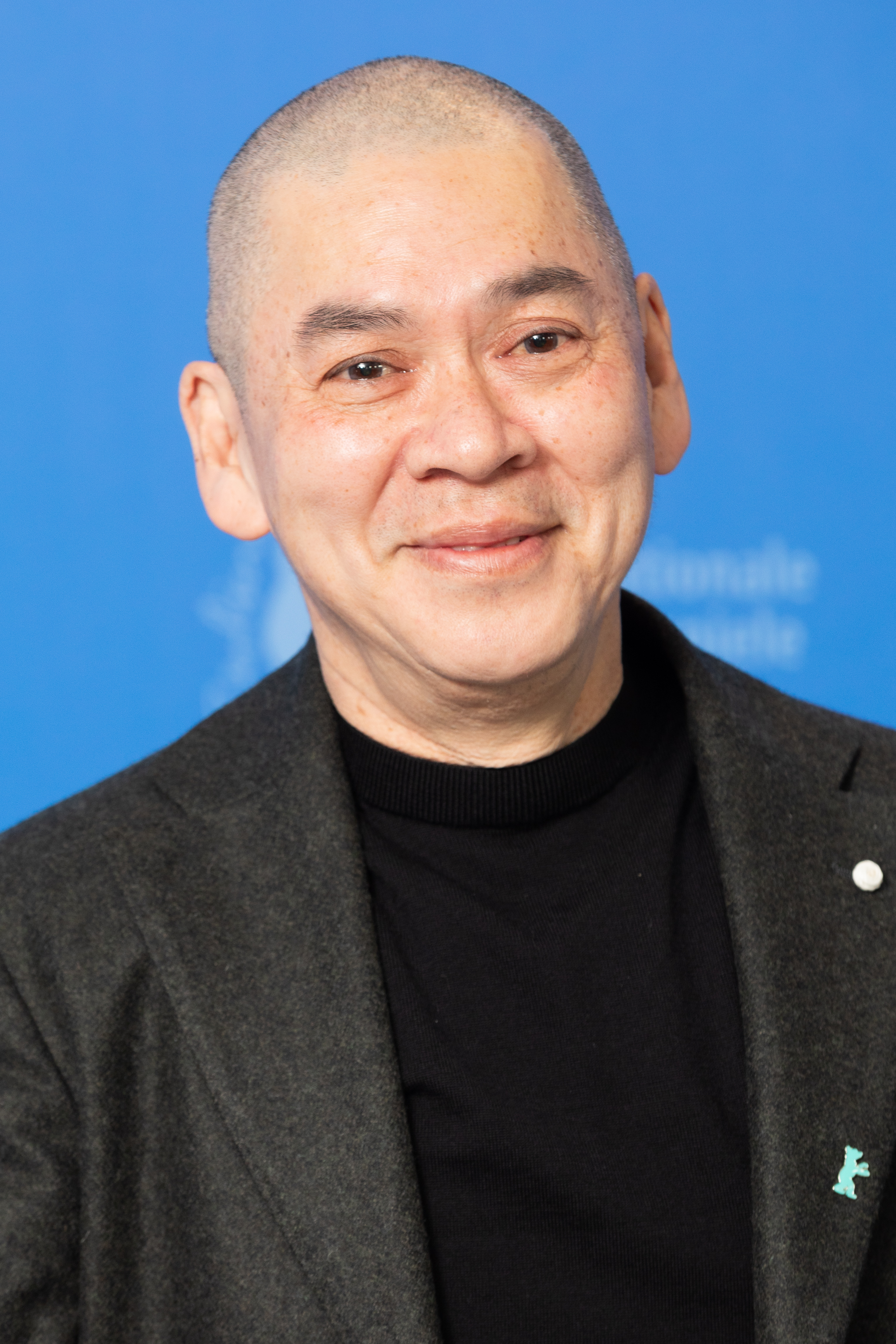
Tsai Ming-liang won for The Wayward Cloud (2005).

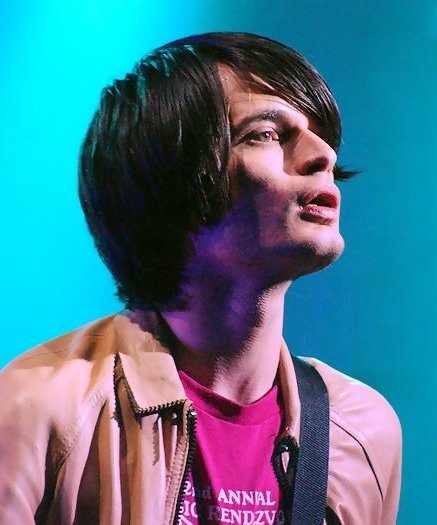
Jonny Greenwood won for the score of There Will Be Blood (2008).

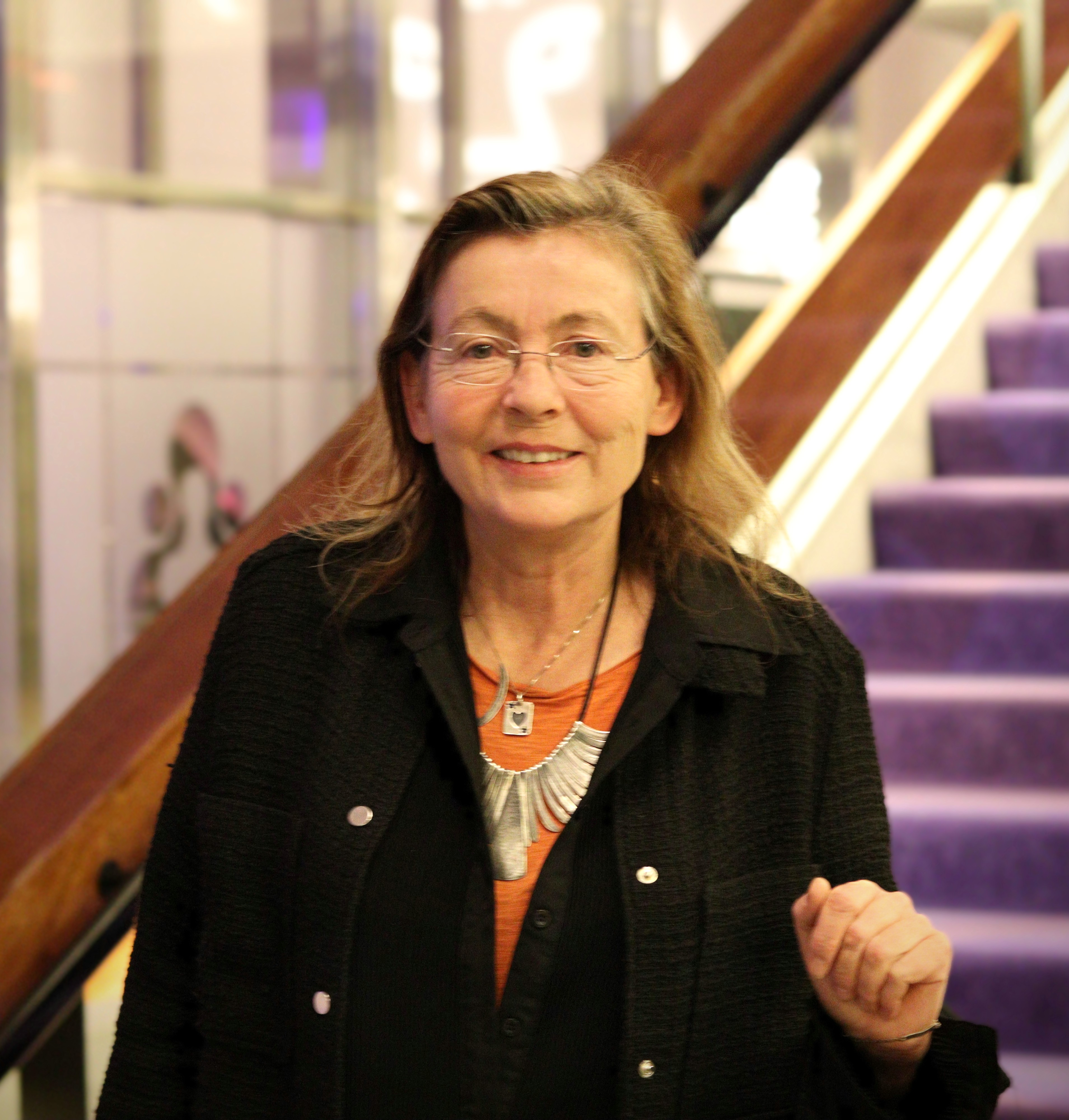
Hélène Louvart won for the cinematography of Disco Boy (2023).

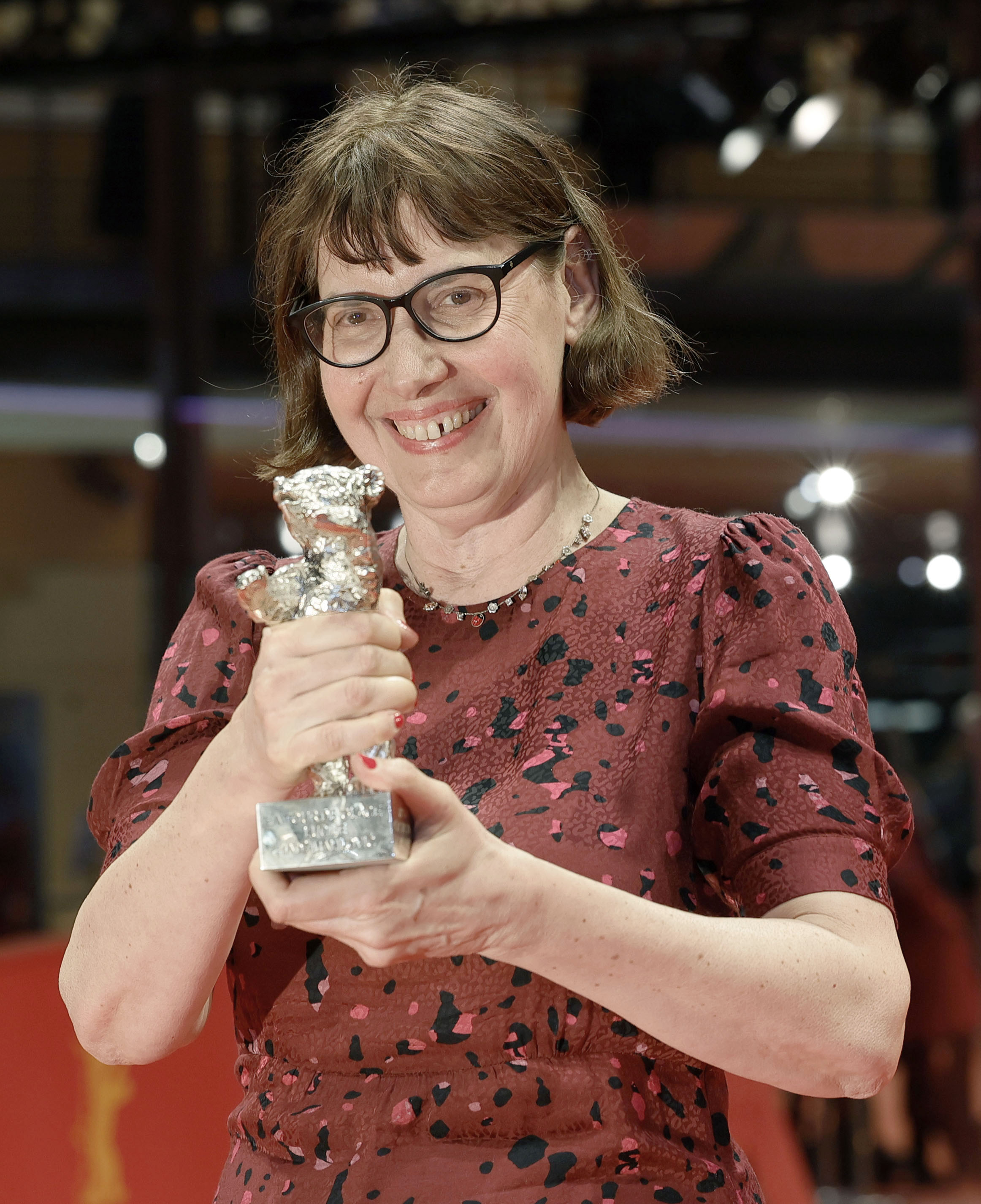
Lucile Hadžihalilović won for The Ice Tower (2025).

=== 1950s ===
Year	Recipient	Craft	English title	Original title	Ref.
1956	André Michel	Artistic Contribution	La Sorcière		

=== 1970s ===
Year	Recipient	Craft	English title	Original title	Ref.
1972	Peter Ustinov	Artistic Contribution	Hammersmith Is Out		
1975	Woody Allen	Artistic Contribution	Love and Death		
1976	László Lugossy	Artistic Contribution	Man Without a Name	Azonosítás	
1978	Octavio Cortázar	Artistic Contribution	The Teacher	El brigadista	
1978	Jerzy Kawalerowicz	Artistic Contribution	Death of a President	Śmierć prezydenta	

=== 1980s ===
Year	Recipient	Craft	English title	Original title	Ref.
1985	Tage Danielsson	Artistic Contribution	Ronia, the Robber's Daughter	Ronja Rövardotter	
1986	Masahiro Shinoda	Artistic Contribution	Gonza the Spearman	近松門左衛門 鑓の権三	
1987	Randa Haines	Artistic Contribution	Children of a Lesser God		
1988	Miguel Pereira	Artistic Contribution	Verónico Cruz	Verónico Cruz: La deuda interna	
1989	Kaipo Cohen and Gila Almagor	Artistic Contribution	Aviya's Summer	הקיץ של אביה	

=== 1990s ===
Year	Recipient	English title	Original title	Ref.
1990	Heiner Carow	Coming Out		
1992	Pilar Miró	Prince of Shadows	Beltenebros	
1993	Temur Babluani	The Sun of the Sleepless	უძინართა მზე	
1994	Semyon Aranovich	The Year of the Dog	Год собаки	
1996	Andrzej Wajda	Holy Week	Wielki tydzień	
1997	Raúl Ruiz	Genealogies of a Crime	Généalogies d'un crime	
1998	Alain Resnais	Same Old Song	On connaît la chanson	
1999	David Cronenberg	eXistenZ		

=== 2000s ===
Year	Recipient	Craft	English title	Original title	Ref.
2000	Ensemble Cast	Acting	Paradiso: Seven Days with Seven Women	Paradiso – Sieben Tage mit sieben Frauen	
2001	Raúl Pérez Cubero	Cinematography	You're the One	Una historia de entonces	
2002	Female Ensemble Cast	Acting	8 Women	8 femmes	
2003	Li Yang	Artistic Contribution	Blind Shaft	盲井	
2004	Ensemble Cast	Acting	Daybreak	Om jag vänder mig om	
2005	Tsai Ming-liang	Artistic Contribution	The Wayward Cloud	天邊一朵雲	
2006	Jürgen Vogel	Artistic Contribution	The Free Will	Der freie Wille	
2007	Ensemble Cast	Acting	The Good Shepherd		
2008	Jonny Greenwood	Score	There Will Be Blood		
2009	György Kovács, Gábor ifj. Erdélyi and Tamás Székely	Sound Design	Katalin Varga		

=== 2010s ===
Year	Recipient	Craft	English title	Original title	Ref.
2010	Pavel Kostomarov	Cinematography	How I Ended This Summer	Как я провёл этим летом	
2011	Barbara Enriquez	Production Design	The Prize	El premio	
2011	Wojciech Staroń	Cinematography	The Prize	El premio	
2012	Lutz Reitemeier	Cinematography	White Deer Plain	白鹿原	
2013	Aziz Zhambakiyev	Cinematography	Harmony Lessons	Асланның сабақтары	
2014	Zeng Jian	Cinematography	Blind Massage	推拿	
2015	Sturla Brandth Grøvlen	Cinematography	Victoria		
2015	Serhiy Mykhalchuk and Evgeniy Privin	Cinematography	Under Electric Clouds	Под электрическими облаками	
2016	Mark Lee Ping Bin	Cinematography	Crosscurrent	长江图	
2017	Dana Bunescu	Editing	Ana, mon amour		
2018	Elena Okopnaya	Costumes and Production Design	Dovlatov	Довлатов	
2019	Rasmus Videbæk	Cinematography	Out Stealing Horses	Ut og stjæle hester	

=== 2020s ===
Year	Recipient	Craft	English title	Original title	Ref.
2020	Jürgen Jürges	Cinematography	DAU. Natasha		
2021	Yibrán Asuad	Editing	A Cop Movie	Una película de policías	
2022	Rithy Panh and Sarit Mang	Artistic Contribution	Everything Will Be Ok		
2023	Hélène Louvart	Cinematography	Disco Boy		
2024	Martin Gschlacht	Cinematography	The Devil’s Bath	Des Teufels Bad	
2025	Lucile Hadžihalilović and creative ensemble	Artistic Contribution	The Ice Tower	La Tour de glace	
2026	Anna Fitch and Banker White	Artistic Contribution	Yo (Love Is a Rebellious Bird)		
