= Tyler Strickland =

American film and television composer

- Genre: Film score
- Years active: 2012–present

Tyler Strickland is an Emmy Award Winning film and television composer based in Los Angeles, CA. He is best known for providing the scores for films such as John Candy: I Like Me, Descendent, John Wayne Gacy: Devil In Disguise, Faye and Chef's Table. He has composed the music for over 80 films and television shows. He won the 2022 Daytime Emmy for Outstanding Music Direction and Composition for Cat People. He won the 2026 Emmy for Outstanding Music Composition for a Documentary/Nonfiction or Reality Program for John Candy: I Like Me.

He is also an award winning music producer, having received a Dove Award for producing Jon Foreman's solo album.

== Career ==
Early in his career as a musician, Strickland toured as a multi-instrumentalist for an artist signed to Capitol Records. Strickland posits that sound is "50 percent of everything we experience on a day to day basis… Without the right music, no environment is complete". All pacing in regards to score must stem from the on-screen image. He describes this as only way to assure a score is enhancing the film, as opposed to distracting viewers from it. One of the most important elements in Strickland's workflow is communication with a director—he describes this as potentially one of the most "inspiring and exciting" parts of the scoring process.

== Selected filmography ==
Year	Title
2025	John Candy: I Like Me
2025	Descendent
2024	Face to Face with Scott Peterson
2024	Faye
2023	Thriller 40
2023	Navajo Police: Class 57
2023	Sly
2023	Who Killed Robert Wone?
2022	Edge of the Earth
2022	Make People Better
2021	Cat People
2021	Pride
2021	John Wayne Gacy: Devil in Disguise
2021	The Oxy Kingpins
2020	Nasrin
2020	Chef's Table: BBQ
2020	Street Food: Latin America
2020	Trial by Media
2019	Torn Apart: Separated at the Border
2019	Changing the Game
2019	Ernie & Joe: Crisis Cops
2017-2018	Independent Lens
2018	Young Men and Fire
2018	Swiped: Hooking Up in the Digital Age
2018	Back to Malheur: Two Years Later
2018	Survivors
2018	The American Meme
2017	Secret History of Comics
2017	Mankiller
2017	A River Below
2017	The Mars Generation
2016	Plastic China
2016	Explorer
2014-2016	P.O.V.
2016	Best and Most Beautiful Things
2016	Audrie & Daisy
2015	Overburden
2015	Fresh Dressed
2015	Hot Girls Wanted
2014	Tough Love
2013	Schooled: The Price of College Sports
2013	The Genius of Marian
