= Fresh Dressed =

- Directed by: Sacha Jenkins
- Music by: Tyler Strickland
- Release date: January 25, 2015 (Sundance Film Festival)
- Country: United States
- Language: English

Fresh Dressed is a 2015 documentary film directed by Sacha Jenkins which chronicles the history of hip hop fashion. The film is Jenkins' directorial debut. North American rights to the film were purchased by Samuel Goldwyn Films and StyleHaul following its premiere at the 2015 Sundance Film Festival. The film features Kanye West, Pharrell Williams, Swizz Beats, and other prominent hip hop figures as talking heads. CNN plans to air the film later in 2015.

== Production ==
The film took Jenkins around 18 months to make. Nas co-produced the film with Peter Bittenbender and Marcus A. Clarke.
