= Navajo Police: Class 57 =

- Genre: Documentary
- Directed by: Kahlil Hudson; Alex Jablonski; David Nordstrom
- Music by: Tyler Strickland; Michael Begay
- Country of origin: United States
- Original language: English
- No. of episodes: 3

Production
- Executive producers: Kahlil Hudson; Alex Jablonski; David Nordstrom; Blackhorse Lowe; Davis Guggenheim; Nicole Stott; Myles Estey; Jonathan Silberberg; Laurene Powell Jobs; Nancy Abraham; Lisa Heller; Tina Nguyen
- Producers: Mark Cummins; Priscilla Naunġaġiaq Hensley; Arielle Kilker
- Cinematography: Kahlil Hudson; Alex Jablonski; Leroy Grafe; Shaandiin Tome
- Editor: Rejh Cabrera
- Running time: 57-58 minutes
- Production companies: HBO Documentary Films; Concordia Studio

Original release
- Network: HBO
- Release: October 17 – October 18, 2023

Navajo Police: Class 57 is a 2023 American documentary series directed and produced by Kahlil Hudson, Alex Jablonski and David Nordstrom. It follows recruits for the Navajo Police Training Academy over the course of a year.

It premiered on October 17, 2023, on HBO.

== Premise ==
The series follows a group of recruits for the Navajo Police Training Academy in Navajo Nation, over the course of a year. Additionally following them out in the field, where they must deal with rising crime rates and centuries of neglect in the community.

== Episodes ==
No.	Title	Directed by	Original release date
1	"Episode One"	Kahlil Hudson; Alex Jablonski; David Nordstrom	October 17, 2023
2	"Episode Two"	Kahlil Hudson; Alex Jablonski; David Nordstrom	October 17, 2023
3	"Episode Three"	Kahlil Hudson; Alex Jablonski; David Nordstrom	October 18, 2023

== Production ==
While the series was in development, Kahlil Hudson and Alex Jablonski earned the trust of the community, proving themselves and their intentions to the police department and recruits.

In October 2023, it was announced Kahlil Hudson, Alex Jablonski and David Nordstrom had directed the series, with Davis Guggenheim and Blackhorse Lowe executive producing, HBO Documentary Films and Concordia Studio producing.
