= Ambulance (2016 film) =

2016 documentary film by Mohamed Jabaly

- Directed by: Mohamed Jabaly
- Produced by: John Arvid Berger
- Starring: Mohamed Jabaly
- Cinematography: Mohamed Jabaly
- Edited by: Nanna Frank Møller
- Music by: Gaute Barlindhaug
- Production companies: Jab Films; Idiom Films
- Distributed by: First Hand Films
- Release date: 2016
- Running time: 80 minutes
- Countries: Norway, Palestine

Ambulance is an 80-minute documentary film directed by Palestinian filmmaker Mohamed Jabaly, documenting his experience during the July 2014 war in Gaza as he accompanies an ambulance crew, offering a first-person perspective on daily life under siege and his coming of age amid ongoing conflict.

== Synopsis ==
The documentary follows Palestinian filmmaker Mohamed Jabaly during the 51 days of war in Gaza in 2014, as he documents daily life while accompanying an ambulance crew responding to airstrikes. Filmed largely from inside the ambulance, the documentary combines urgent, handheld footage of emergency rescues with quieter moments of reflection, capturing both the immediate danger of the conflict and Jabaly's personal attempt to confront fear and make sense of his surroundings.

== Production ==
In the summer of 2014, at the start of Operation Protective Edge, Mohamed Jabaly was working in a hospital in Gaza City, where he was filming a surgical procedure for an unrelated project. After the outbreak of hostilities, he requested permission to accompany an ambulance crew.

After receiving permission from the hospital director, he was allowed to accompany an ambulance crew led by Abu Marzouq. Jabaly filmed alongside the paramedics for the duration of the conflict, recording dozens of hours of footage during emergency responses across Gaza over a seven-week period. The film was shot chronologically as events unfolded and relies primarily on handheld camerawork from inside the ambulance.

== Release ==
Ambulance had its world premiere at Sheffield Doc/Fest in 2016.

The film won several awards, including Best Feature Documentary at One World Media in 2017, for which Jabaly also received the BBC Arabic Young Journalist Award, as well as the FIPA d’Or Award and the Jury Award for Best Feature Documentary at FIPA in Biarritz, France.

== Reception ==
On the review aggregator website Rotten Tomatoes, 100% of 5 critics' reviews are positive.

In its review for Screen Daily, Ambulance is described as an immersive, first-person documentary that follows Gaza paramedics during the 2014 conflict. The review praises the film's immediacy and editorial shaping, noting that by focusing on everyday human experience rather than political argument, it offers a reflective and affecting portrait of life under siege.
