= Face to Face with Scott Peterson =

American documentary series

- Genre: Documentary
- Directed by: Shareen Anderson; Po Kutchins
- Music by: Tyler Strickland
- Country of origin: United States
- Original language: English
- No. of episodes: 3

Production
- Executive producers: Shareen Anderson; Po Kutchins; Liz Yale Marsh; Tim Clancy
- Running time: 57-58 min.
- Production company: Universal Television Alternative Studios

Original release
- Network: Peacock
- Release: August 20, 2024

Face to Face with Scott Peterson is an American documentary series directed and produced by Shareen Anderson and Po Kutchins. It follows the Murder of Laci Peterson, with Scott Peterson giving his first interview in decades, and developments on his case.

It premiered on August 20, 2024, on Peacock.

== Premise ==
The series follows the Murder of Laci Peterson, with Scott Peterson giving his first interview in decades to director Shareen Anderson, as well as developments since the Los Angeles Innocence Project has taken up the case. Janey Peterson, former police detective Al Brocchini, detective Jon Buehler, former defense attorney Lara Yeretsian, and former ABC News producer, Mike Gudgell appear in the series.

== Production ==
Shareen Anderson and Po Kutchins previously produced The Murder of Laci Peterson for A&E.
