= The News Hole =

- Presented by: Harry Shearer

Production
- Running time: 30 minutes
- Production company: Century of Progress Productions

Original release
- Network: Comedy Central
- Release: October 26 – November 19, 1994

The News Hole with Harry Shearer is a 1994 game show that aired on Comedy Central from October 26 to November 19, 1994. The show won a CableACE award in December 1995.

In the Encyclopedia of TV Game Shows, Schwartz, Ryan, and Wostbrock describe the show as a "spoof [of] news-based quiz shows."
