= Banker White =

American filmmaker and producer

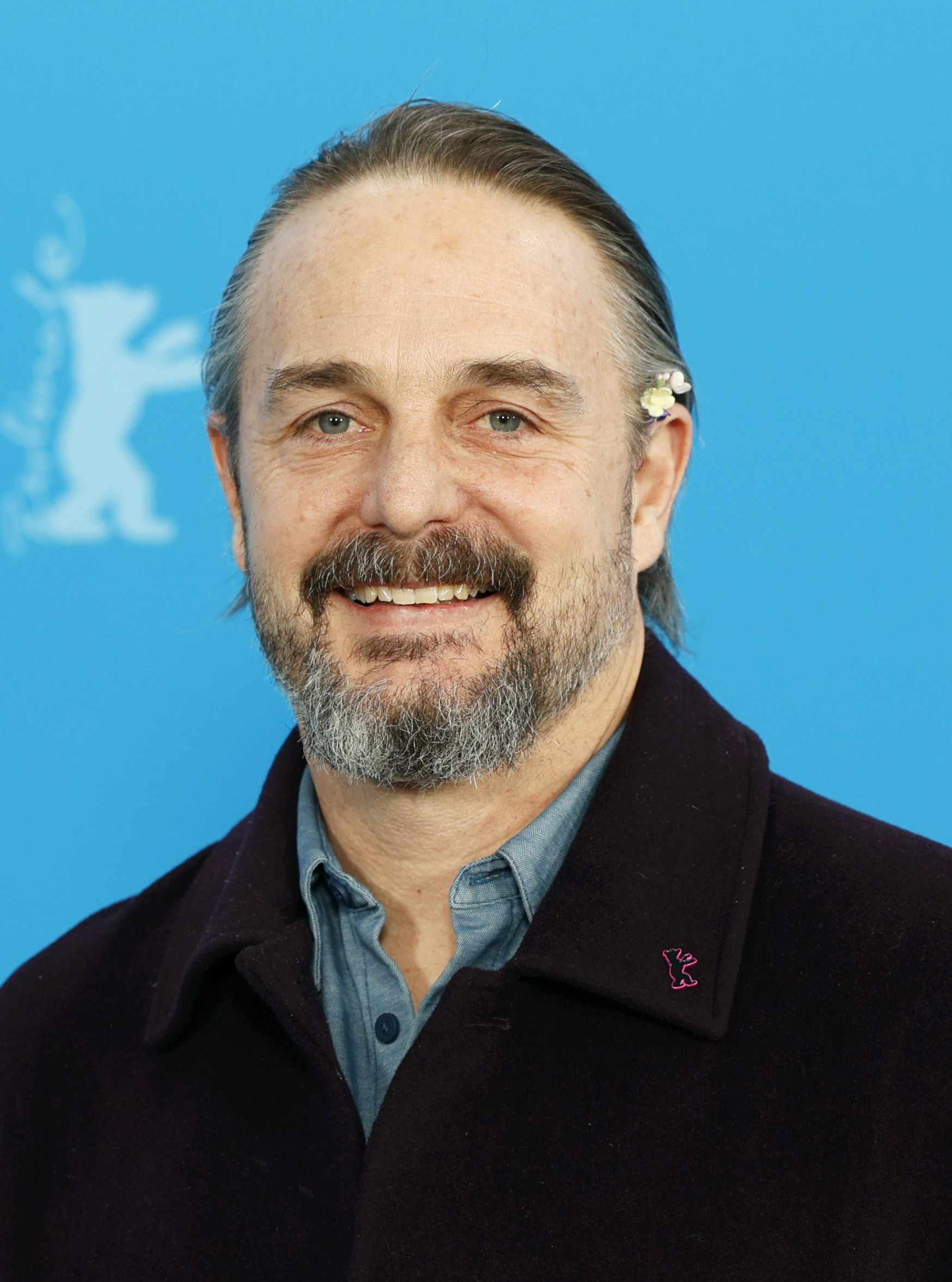
- White in 2026
- Born: Banker White; San Francisco, United States of America
- Education: Middlebury College; California College of the Arts
- Occupations: Director, producer, cinematographer, editor, writer
- Years active: 2005–present
- Spouse: Anna Fitch
- Children: 2
- Parents: Ed White (father); Pamela Steele White (mother)
- Relatives: Marian Williams Steele (grand mother)

Banker White, is an American filmmaker and film producer. He is best known as the director and producer of the critically acclaimed films Survivors, The Genius of Marian and Sierra Leone's Refugee All Stars.

== Personal life ==
His father was Ed White and mother, Pamela Steele White, was a renowned therapist. She died on 6 June 2016 at the age of 69 after suffering from Alzheimer's disease. Banker graduated with a BA from Middlebury College in 1995 and later obtained an MFA from the California College of the Arts in 2000. Banker has two siblings: Devon White Angelini, and Luke White.

Banker is married to Anna Fitch, his creative partner. The couple has a daughter Dylan and a son Oscar.

== Career ==
He produced the film The Genius of Marian which was based on the story of his mother, and her struggle with Alzheimer's disease. The film had its premiere at the Tribecca Film Festival. It was aired nationally for the first time on PBS's POV on 8 September 2014.

In 2005, he became the producer, co-director and writer for the film Sierra Leone's Refugee All Stars with Zach Niles. The film rotates about the Sierra Leone's Refugee All Stars musical band composed entirely of refugees from Freetown displaced to Guinea during the 1991-2002 civil war in Sierra Leone. The film received critical acclaim and won awards at 12 international film festivals. The film had its premiere in November 2005 in Los Angeles at the American Film Institute's Film Fest, winning the Grand Jury Prize for best documentary. Meanwhile, the film was also nominated by the IDA for Best Feature in 2006 and won Grand Jury Awards at AFI Fest, Full Frame Film Festival and Human Rights Watch Film Festival. It was later earned audience awards at SXSW and Miami International Film Festival.

He is also the co-founder of a film and multi-media educational program titled 'WeOwnTV' founded for disadvantaged youth in Freetown, Sierra Leone. In 2018, he co-directed and produced the film Survivors, which was later nominated for the Peabody and Emmy Award. The film received positive reviews and won several awards at international film festivals. The film nominated for the Emmy's Best Social Issue Documentary in 2018, becoming the first ever West African film to receive the accolade.

== Partial filmography ==
Year	Film	Role	Genre	Ref.
2005	Sierra Leone's Refugee All Stars	Director, producer, editor, cinematographer	Documentary	
2007	P.O.V.	Director, producer, editor, cinematographer	Home	
2010	Charity	Director, producer, editor, cinematographer, writer	Short film	
2013	The Genius of Marian	Director, producer, cinematographer	Documentary	
2014	Op-Docs	Director, producer, editor	TV series documentary	
2018	Survivors	Director, producer, editor	Documentary	
2026	Yo (Love Is a Rebellious Bird)	Director, producer, editor	Documentary	

== Accolades ==
Ceremony	Award	Film	Result	Ref.
76th Berlin International Film Festival	Silver Bear for Outstanding Artistic Contribution	Yo (Love Is a Rebellious Bird)	Won	

== See also ==
- Nashville Film Festival
