= Start Up (2013 TV series) =

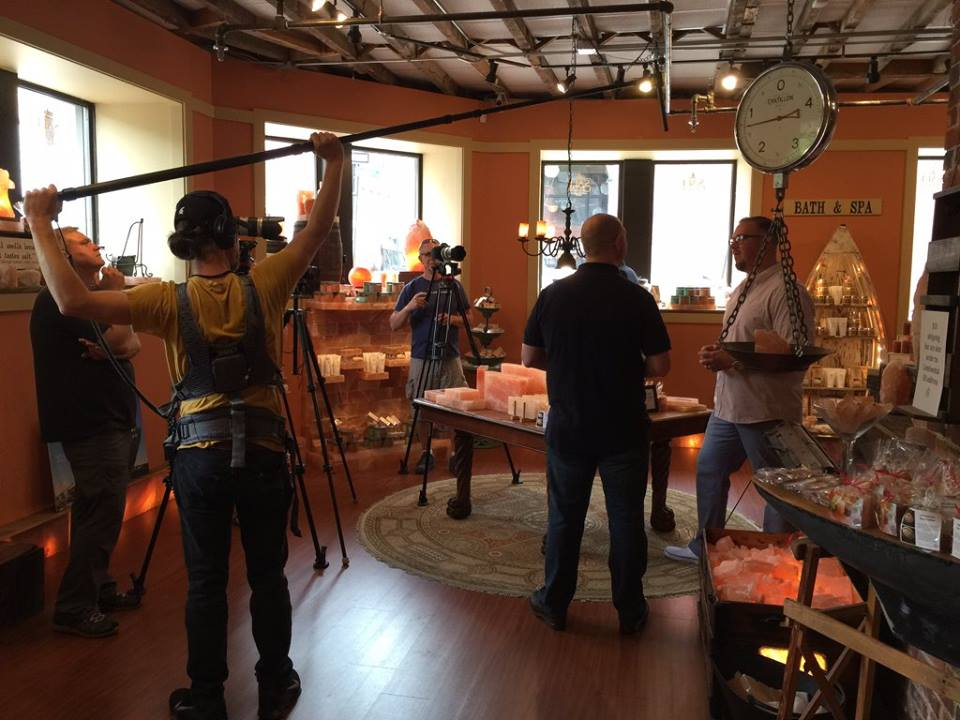
- Genre: Docu-series; Reality TV
- Created by: Gary Bredow
- Starring: Gary Bredow
- Country of origin: United States
- Original language: English
- No. of seasons: 12
- No. of episodes: 156 (list of episodes)

Production
- Producers: Jenny Feterovich; Gary Bredow
- Running time: 30 minutes
- Production company: Start Up Television Project LLC

Original release
- Release: September 4, 2014 – present

START UP is a national American docu-series television show created by Gary Bredow. The series is produced by Jenny Feterovich and Gary Bredow and is broadcast by public television stations.

== Premise ==
The show is filmed all across America where host Gary Bredow conducts in-depth interviews with small business owners about how they were able to get their business off the ground. Season 13 will premiere in early September 2025.

Gary Bredow is a dedicated advocate for American small business. Although his focus has always been on writing and film, as an entrepreneur, he co-owns several businesses in the Detroit area.

"It started off as just overwhelming curiosity in how people did business," Bredow said. "I wanted to be a better business person."

"There's something really incredible happening in this country. People are fed up with traditional employment, and they're taking back control of their lives. It's truly inspiring, and I feel incredibly privileged to be part of the entrepreneur movement in America." says Gary Bredow.

== Inspiration ==
The inspiration for START UP came at the height of the financial crash in 2009. His father had lost his pension and retirement benefits, and Bredow noticed that many of the people around him were deciding to pursue their own business versus seeking new employment. “It ended up being the perfect storm. These things that kept them up at night, that they fantasized about doing, now they were forced to do it,” he said. “It ended up being a positive thing and that's really how the idea for Start Up was born." Bredow called on friend and producer Jenny Feterovich to partner with him on the series. Feterovich cast the first season of the START UP through a rigorous research process, casting 39 businesses that made it into Season one. Now entering their 13th season, Bredow says "We really want to do this as long as humanly possible, and we'll never run out of fascinating stories."

== Awards ==
The show was nominated for an Emmy Award on June 14, 2014, at the 36th annual Emmy Awards, National Academy of Arts and Science Michigan Chapter.
