= Esther van Messel =

Dutch-Swiss film producer (born 1965)

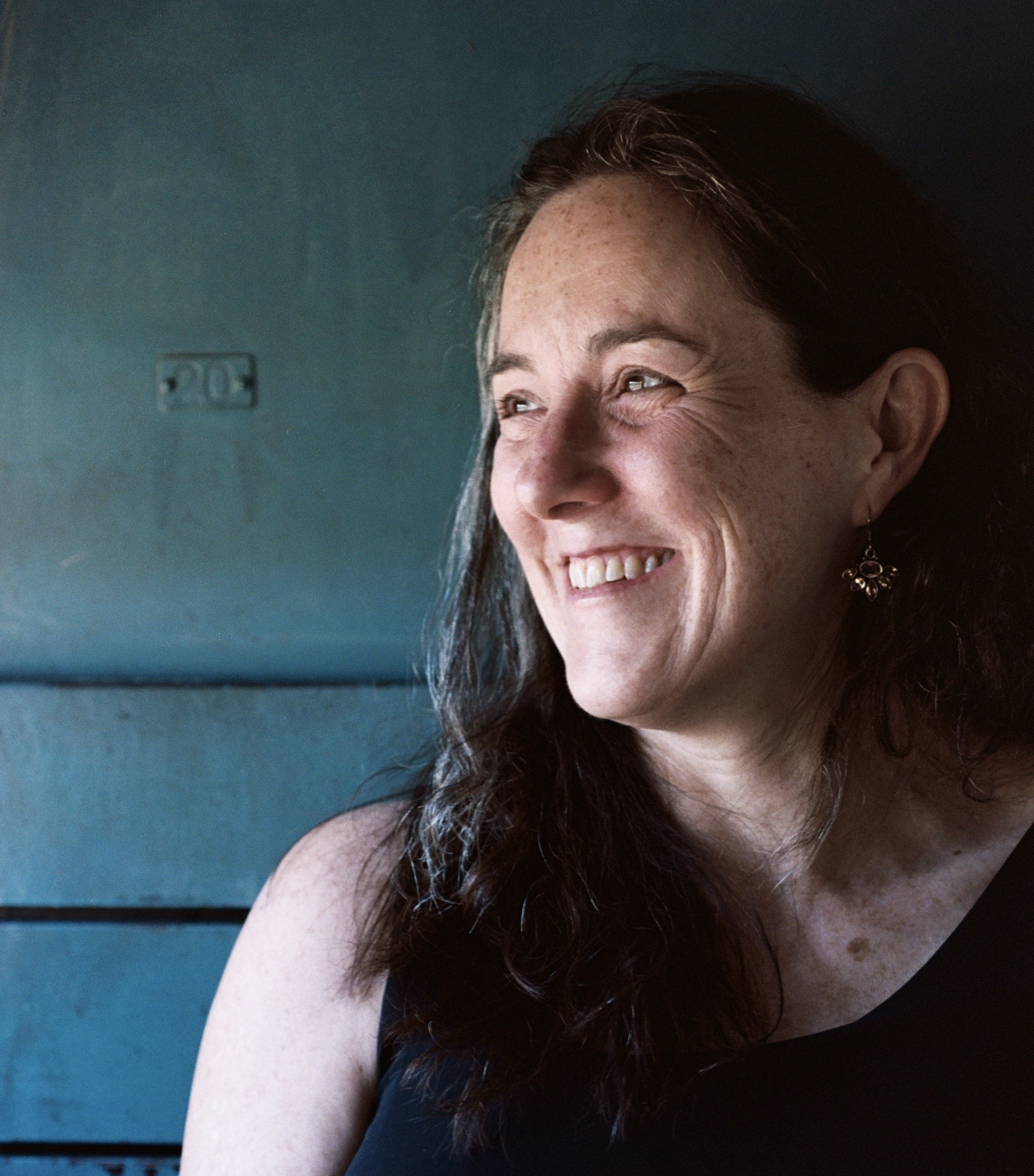
- Esther in 2025
- Born: Esther van Messel; 1965 (age 60–61); Austria
- Occupations: Film producer; Film distributor
- Years active: 1990–present

Esther van Messel is an Austrian-born Swiss film producer, sales executive and distributor. She is the founder and CEO of First Hand Films, a Zurich- and Berlin-based company focused on the international sales, production and Swiss theatrical distribution of non-fiction films.

== Early life and education ==
Born in Vienna, Austria in 1965, van Messel grew up across several countries, including the Netherlands, the United States and Switzerland. At the age of 19, she emigrated to Israel, where she lived for seven years.

She studied film at the University of Tel Aviv in the class of 1986.

== Career ==
1990, van Messel began her professional career at Warner Bros., Israel, initially working as a secretary before rising to the position of General Manager. She later returned to Switzerland, where she worked for a production company for five years.

In 1998, van Messel founded First Hand Films in Zurich, followed by the establishment of a Berlin office in 1999. The company has since specialized in the international sales and production of documentary films and series. Through First Hand Films, van Messel has been active in financing, producing and selling non-fiction works for the global market.

In 2022, van Messel produced and co-wrote Polish Prayers, directed by Hanka Nobis, which screened at the International Documentary Film Festival Amsterdam. She also developed and produced Nobis' subsequent documentary, Songs of Sisterhood.

In 2024, van Messel distributed Our Land, Our Freedom, a documentary examining the legacy of British colonial rule in Kenya through the story of Wanjugu Kimathi, daughter of Mau Mau leader Dedan Kimathi, in collaboration with partners from Kenya, the United States and Portugal. The film premiered at IDFA and was later acquired by BBC Africa Eye, with international sales handled by First Hand Films. She produced Kalari Kid, an India-set verité film exploring violence against women and self-empowerment through the practice of the traditional martial art Kalaripayattu. The project was selected for the Swiss Films Previews showcase at Visions du Réel. Kalari Kid premiered in Solothurn Film Festival in January 2026.

== Industry perspective ==
In interviews, van Messel has commented on structural challenges in the contemporary documentary marketplace. She has criticised what she describes as declining engagement by European public broadcasters with politically challenging and personal documentaries, citing a shift toward safer investigative formats.

She has noted the growing importance of digital platforms and alternative distribution channels in the revenue mix for independent documentary filmmakers, emphasizing diversification across international sales, theatrical release, and production. She has further noted that documentary festivals play a central role not only in sales but also in dialogue, professional exchange and artistic visibility.

In March 2025, van Messel participated as a panelist at Docedge Kolkata in a discussion titled "Towards an Equitable Collaboration: Sustainable Co-production, where she spoke about fair co-production practices and artistic rights.

== Partial filmography ==
Year	Title	Role	Notes
1997	Fremd geboren	Director, Screenwriter, Editor	
2008	Jerusalem Cuts	Producer	
2018	Beyond Boobs	Producer	
2022	Polish Prayers	Screenwriter, Producer	
2022	Systemrelevant aber unsichtbar	Producer	
2024	Frauen erobern das Kunstbusiness	Screenwriter, Producer	
2025	Songs of Sisterhood	Screenwriter, Producer	
2026	I Made a Mistake	Producer	
2026	Kalari Kid – She Hits Back	Producer	
