= Cat People (TV series) =

- Promotional poster
- Genre: Docuseries
- Created by: Glen Zipper
- Written by: Glen Zipper
- Directed by: Don Argott; Sheena M. Joyce; Neil Berkeley; Ivan Kovac; Donal Mosher; Michael Palmieri; Sandi Tan
- Music by: Tyler Strickland
- Country of origin: United States
- Original language: English
- No. of seasons: 1
- No. of episodes: 6

Production
- Cinematography: Cameron S. Mitchell; Michael Palmieri; Humphrey Lena Rodriguez; Joshua Z Weinstein; Graham Willoughby
- Editors: Michael Mees; Ruben Sebban; Keita Ideno; Stefanie Schaldenbrand
- Running time: 29-35 minutes
- Production company: Sutter Road Picture Company

Original release
- Release: July 7, 2021

Cat People is a 2021 American Netflix documentary series created by Glen Zipper. The six-part series follows the lives of six different individuals who have built their lives around their pets. It was released on July 1, 2021.
