= Fresh, Fried and Crispy =

American docu-series on Netflix

- Genre: Food reality television
- Starring: Daym Drops
- Country of origin: United States
- Original language: English
- No. of seasons: 1
- No. of episodes: 8

Production
- Running time: 24 min.
- Production company: Ugly Brother Studios

Original release
- Network: Netflix
- Release: June 9, 2021

Fresh, Fried and Crispy is an American food reality television series hosted by American food critic and YouTube personality Daym Drops. It premiered on Netflix on June 9, 2021.

== Episodes ==
No.	Title	Original release date
1	"St. Louis"	June 9, 2021
Daym has arancini at Italian restaurant Zia's; fried apple pie and a mock chicken burger at vegan bakery SweetArt; and toasted ravioli made with beaver, a fried venison steak, and a bologna sandwich at the home of Grace Meat + Three chef and co-owner Rick Lewis.
2	"Savannah"	June 9, 2021
Daym has a shrimp po' boy at Hudson's; tacos and fried peach from the food truck Dark Shark; a fish sandwich at Shabazz Seafood Restaurant; and a variety of appetizers and a deep-fried chicken pot pie at Treylor Park.
3	"Las Vegas"	June 9, 2021
Daym has ube (purple yam) French toast and spam fries at Truffles N Bacon Café; whole fried rainbow trout and salmon skin tacos at Vietnamese-American restaurant The Black Sheep; meatballs and potstickers from the food truck Prisma; and a "Whale Burger" (comprising a pound of wagyu beef, truffle cheese, a fried lobster tail, bacon and a gold-dusted bun) at Slater's 50/50.
4	"Baltimore"	June 9, 2021
Daym and Baltimore food personality Tim Chyno Chin have homemade fried crab stuffed dumplings; a fried pork belly burger at Between Two Buns; a crab sandwich at The Local Oyster; an assortment of fried food including mozzarella sticks, onion rings, and chicken wings at The Food Market; and a family picnic hosted by the owners of Faidley's Seafood.
5	"San Diego"	June 9, 2021
Daym has dry-aged rib eye steak at Cow by Bear; chicken and waffles at Rhythm's; and deep fried Oreos, Kool-Aid and salt water taffies at Chicken Charlie's Fair Stand.
6	"Denver"	June 9, 2021
Daym has Rocky Mountain oysters at the Buckhorn Exchange; almond crusted hogfish at Big Mac and Little Lu's; green chilli cheese fries and lumpia (Filipino egg rolls) from the food truck Adobo; and nacho fried macaroni and cheese and a Monte Cristo turducken dog at Biker Jim's Gourmet Dogs.
7	"Birmingham"	June 9, 2021
Daym has pig candy; Thai sticky ribs and Southern fried chicken at Pursell Farms; fish and chips and loaded potatoes from the food trailer The Little London; and a private lunch with the owners of Yo' Mama's.
8	"Cleveland"	June 9, 2021
Daym has "Fleetwood Mac and Cheese" from the food truck Smokin' Rock N' Roll run by former guitarist Billy Morris; a cheesesteak at Fahrenheit; angel wings and kotlet schabowy at Mom's Pierogies; and barbecue at Beckham's B & M Bar-B-Que.

== Production ==
Fresh, Fried and Crispy was produced by Ugly Brother Studios. The first season was filmed between July and August 2020. Filming locations included St. Louis; Savannah, Georgia; Las Vegas; Baltimore; San Diego; Denver; Birmingham, Alabama; and Cleveland.

== Release ==
Fresh, Fried and Crispy premiered on Netflix on June 9, 2021.

== Reception ==
Writing for the pop culture website Decider, Joel Keller found the show "just too heavy on shtick to be enjoyable". M. N. Miller of Ready Steady Cut awarded the show 2.5 stars (out of a possible 5), criticizing it for being "reheated entertainment" that "doesn't offer anything new to the genre".
