= You vs. Wild =

Interactive American reality TV show by Netflix

- Genre: Adventure reality television
- Created by: Robert Buchta; Bear Grylls; Delbert Shoopman
- Directed by: Ben Simms
- Starring: Bear Grylls
- Composer: Devin Powers
- Country of origin: United States
- Original language: English
- No. of seasons: 1
- No. of episodes: 8

Production
- Executive producers: Robert Buchta; Bear Grylls; Delbert Shoopman; Drew Buckley; Chris Grant; Howard Owens; Ben Silverman
- Production companies: Bear Grylls Ventures; Electus

Original release
- Network: Netflix
- Release: April 10, 2019

You vs. Wild is a 2019 interactive American adventure reality television series on Netflix. The show's premise revolves around making key decisions to help Bear Grylls navigate in harsh, scary environments to survive and complete missions. Grylls speaks directly to the camera, asking the viewer to select between options like scaling a cliff or scrambling along the coastline, etc.

The full season of You vs. Wild consisting of eight episodes has been released on April 10, 2019.

Later on February 16, 2021, the movie Animals on the Loose: A You vs. Wild Movie was released on Netflix. A second interactive special released on September 14 titled You vs. Wild: Out Cold.

== Cast ==
- Bear Grylls
- Jason Derek Prempeh [In You vs. Wild: Out Cold]
- Ranveer Singh [In Ranveer vs. Wild with Bear Grylls]
- Karan Kapadia [In Ranveer vs. Wild with Bear Grylls]

== Release ==
You vs. Wild has been released on April 10, 2019, on Netflix.

Animals on the Loose: A You vs. Wild Movie was released on February 16, 2021, on Netflix.

You vs. Wild: Out Cold was released in 2021.

On July 8, 2022, the Spin-Off Ranveer vs. Wild with Bear Grylls with Actor Ranveer Singh was released on Netflix.

== Episodes and summaries ==
=== Episode 1 - Operation Jungle Rescue, Pt. 1 ===
The target of this episode is to find a doctor. A doctor is delivering vaccines to small villages, but she is dehydrated and needs Bear's help. There are 2 main ways of going through the episode, you can either go through the jungle using machete to make a trail or you can go through the river. Both ways come to the same spot. At the end of episode, he finds the doctor and takes a challenge to deliver the vaccines by himself because the doctor is very dehydrated.

=== Episode 2 - Operation Jungle Rescue, Pt. 2 ===
The target is to deliver vaccines to the small village. On the way Bear passes through mangrove trees. Also, Bear saw a jaguar on his way. At the end, he gives the vaccines to the leader of the village and paddles away on a canoe.

=== Episode 3 - Searching for a Saint Bernard ===
Deep snow, crevasses and avalanches are just some of the threats Bear will face when you help him locate a lost rescue dog in the Swiss Alps.

=== Episode 4 - Lost on Snow Mountain ===
Bear must survive for 24 hours on a frigid mountain pass in the Swiss Alps until help can arrive. Should he stay put or stay moving? It's your choice!

=== Episode 5 - A Venomous Adventure, Pt. 1 ===
A cargo plane has crash-landed in a scorching desert canyon, and Bear needs your help to find it. But first, will you put him in a plane or a helicopter?

=== Episode 6 - A Venomous Adventure, Pt. 2 ===
Explore the desert as you help Bear comb the unforgiving landscape to acquire the venom of a snake, a scorpion and a tarantula. Can you find all three?

=== Episode 7 - Land of the Dragons ===
Stranded on the cliffs above a rocky coastline, Bear has to make his way miles inland through a dense forest to safety—all with your assistance.

=== Episode 8 - Myth of the Abandoned Mine ===
Bear is dropped into a remote European wilderness near an old mining town. Can you help him find his way back to civilization?

== Specials and Spin-Offs ==
=== Specials ===
==== Animals on the Loose: A You vs. Wild Movie ====
When wild animals escape from a sanctuary, Bear Grylls must pursue them and secure their protective habitat.

==== You vs. Wild: Out Cold ====
When a plane crash leaves Bear with amnesia, he must make choices to save the missing pilot and survive.

=== Spin-Offs ===
==== Ranveer vs Wild with Bear Grylls ====
Click through this interactive special, helping superstar Ranveer Singh and adventurer Bear Grylls brave the Serbian wilderness to find a rare flower.
