= Penguin Town =

2021 Netflix Original documentary television series

- Promotional poster
- Narrated by: Patton Oswalt
- Country of origin: South Africa

Production
- Production company: Red Rock Films

Original release
- Network: Netflix
- Release: 16 June 2021

Penguin Town is a 2021 Netflix Original documentary television series narrated by Patton Oswalt. It follows a group of endangered penguins in Simon's Town, South Africa as they search for mates, raise their young and interact with other penguins. The series was released on June 16, 2021.

== Episodes ==
No.	Title
1	"Homecoming"
2	"The Nest Generation"
3	"Hot and Bothered"
4	"Lost and Found"
5	"Close Encounters"
6	"Weekend Warriors"
7	"Beyond the Nest"
8	"Learning to Fly"

== Production ==
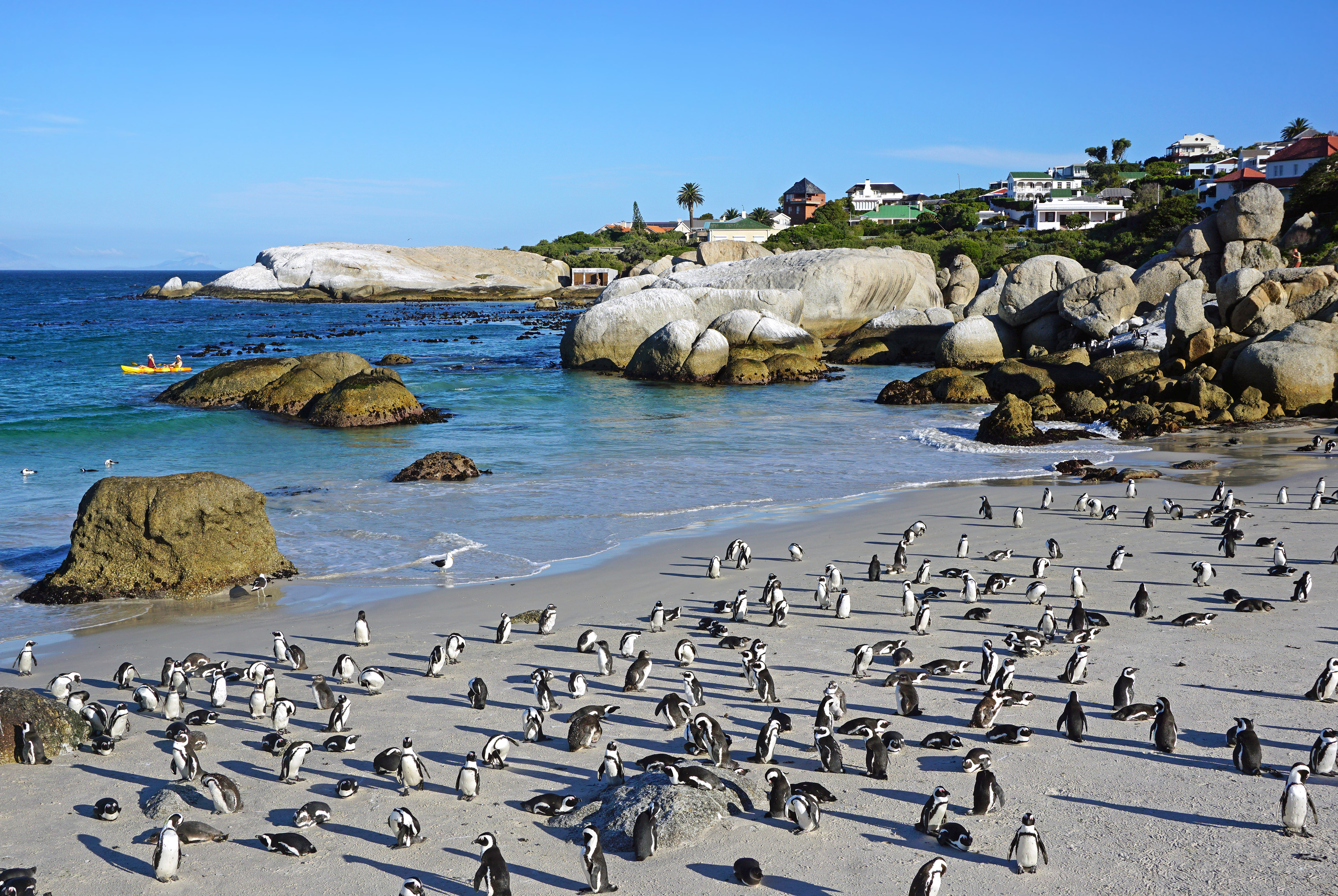
African penguins on Boulders Beach in February 2019

Penguin Town was produced by Red Rock Films. The camera crew from Red Rock Films started by following 80 pairs of penguins, which they later narrowed down to 50 and then the smaller group of penguins that would come to form the story. The camera crew used tripods, waterproof cameras, drones, and an antigravity platform to capture the footage.

Penguin Town is set on Boulders Beach in Simon's Town, a suburb of Cape Town on the Western Cape of South Africa.

The British Board of Film Classification issued a 'Parental Guidance' certificate.

== Broadcast ==
Penguin Town was released on Netflix on 16 June 2021.

== Reception ==
Writing for the Chicago Sun-Times, Richard Roeper described the series as a "featherweight documentary", praising Oswalt's narration. In his review for The Guardian, Stuart Heritage called the series "tremendous comfort food", praising the lack of violence. The New Statesman's India Bourke criticised the series for "lightly mocking an endangered species" for entertainment.
