= Daymon Patterson =

American food critic

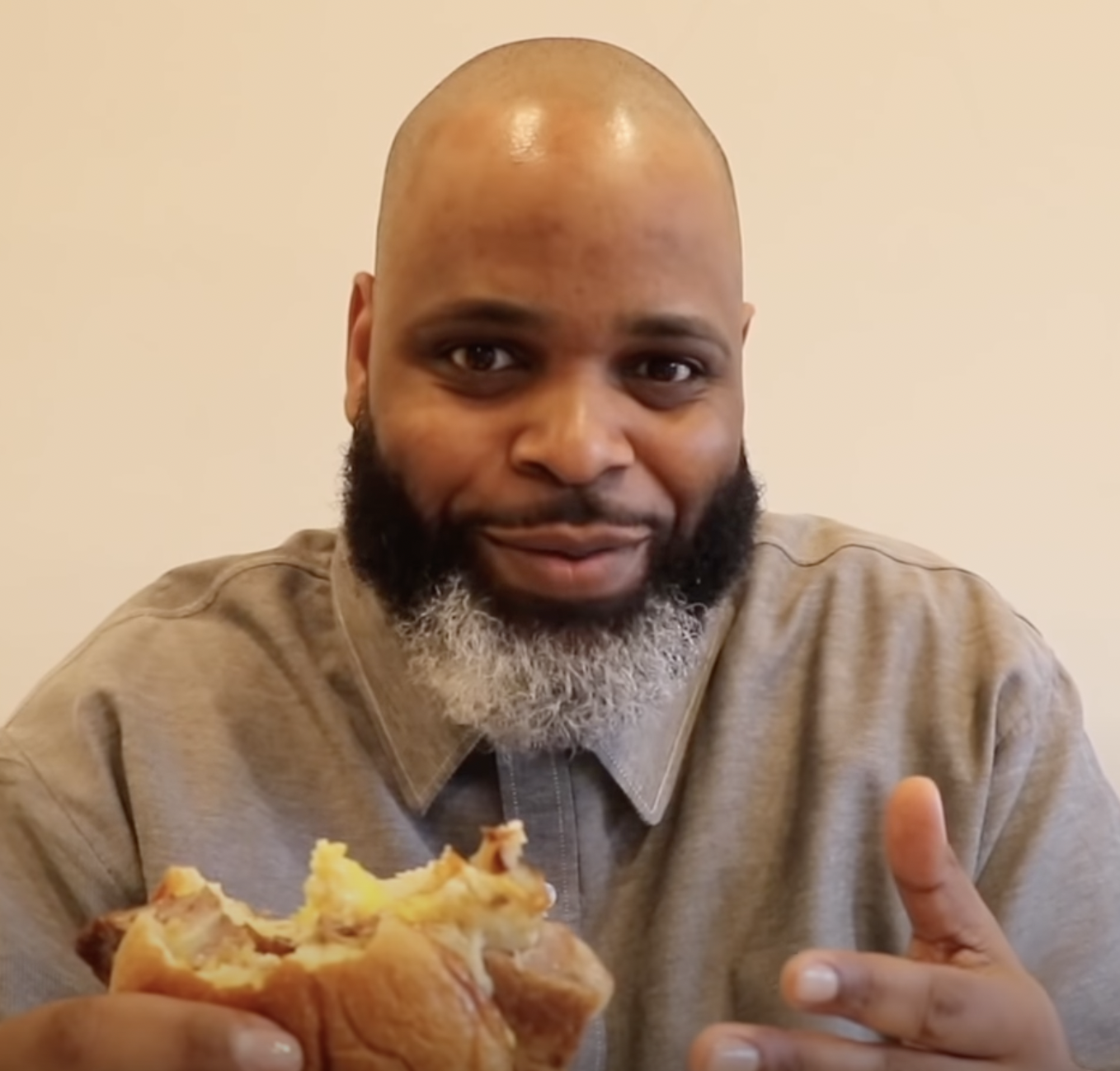
- Daym Drops performing a food review in 2019
- Born: Daymon Scott Patterson; September 24, 1977 (age 48); Bridgeport, Connecticut, U.S.
- Occupation: Food critic
- Years active: 2010–present
- Notable work: Best Daym Takeout
- Height: 6 ft 5 in (196 cm)
- Spouse: Ramyr Gonzales (m. 2012)
- Children: 2

Daymon Scott "Daym" Patterson, better known as Daym Drops (born September 24, 1977), is an American food critic, YouTube celebrity, rapper, and television presenter. He initially gained popularity on the video-sharing site YouTube for his video review of a Five Guys takeout meal, which spawned a viral online song by The Gregory Brothers. He hosted Best Daym Takeout, a food-review-oriented television program on the Travel Channel, based on him and with certain aspects borrowed from his YouTube channel, which aired in 2013.

== Career ==
Prior to becoming a fast food critic, Patterson worked as a manager at retail stores including Walmart and was a buyer at CarMax. He now reviews takeout fast food full-time. Among others, his videos have showcased foods from Burger King, McDonald's, Jack in the Box, In-N-Out Burger, and Taco Bell. He shot to prominence with his viral video titled Five Guys Burgers and Fries Review, where he commented on Five Guys' cheeseburger and fries. The video was remixed into "Oh My Dayum", a song by The Gregory Brothers, which similarly created online buzz. Following his mother admonishing him, Patterson now covers healthier foods in his videos.

His Internet fame spawned interviews with disparate media outlets, including NBC News and Gawker. Chase Hoffberger of The Daily Dot dubbed Patterson as "the most entertaining food reviewer on YouTube". Additionally, he made a guest appearance on an episode of Late Night with Jimmy Fallon. In February 2013, he guest-starred in an Epic Meal Time episode titled "Luther Lasagna". Patterson is the host of the ongoing Travel Channel show Best Daym Takeout (2013). In the television show, which is shot at various locations in the United States, Patterson critiques carry out foods on-screen in his car.

He has also appeared in fast food commercials for Popeyes and Burger King.

He hosted on the Netflix series Fresh, Fried and Crispy, which premiered on June 9, 2021. For this, he was nominated for Outstanding Culinary Host at the 49th Daytime Emmy Awards.

He appeared in the pilot of Netflix's baking competition series Is It Cake?. The full first season was released on March 18, 2022.

== Health ==
In 2018, Patterson revealed he is a Type 2 diabetic.
