= Survivors (2018 film) =

2018 Sierra Leone documentary film

- Directed by: Banker White; Anna Fitch; Lansana Mansaray; Arthur Pratt
- Produced by: Sara Dosa; Samantha Grant; Justine Nagan; Chris White
- Cinematography: Lansana Mansaray
- Edited by: Don Bernier; Banker White
- Music by: Tyler Strickland
- Release date: 2 June 2018
- Running time: 87 minutes
- Country: Sierra Leone
- Language: French

Survivors, is a 2018 Sierra Leonean documentary film co–directed by Banker White, Anna Fitch, Lansana Mansaray, and Arthur Pratt. The film was co–produced by Sara Dosa, Samantha Grant, Justine Nagan, and Chris White.

== Plot ==
The film follows the Ebola pandemic spreading in Sierra Leone that infected 8,704 Sierra Leoneans and killed 3,589 and how the Sierra Leone's heroes eradicate the pandemic.

== Reception ==
In 2019, the film was nominated for Outstanding Social Issue Documentary at the 40th News & Documentary Emmy Awards, making it the first West African film to receive an Emmy nomination. It was also named a documentary finalist and nominee for a Peabody Award in 2019.
