= Cinema of Chad =

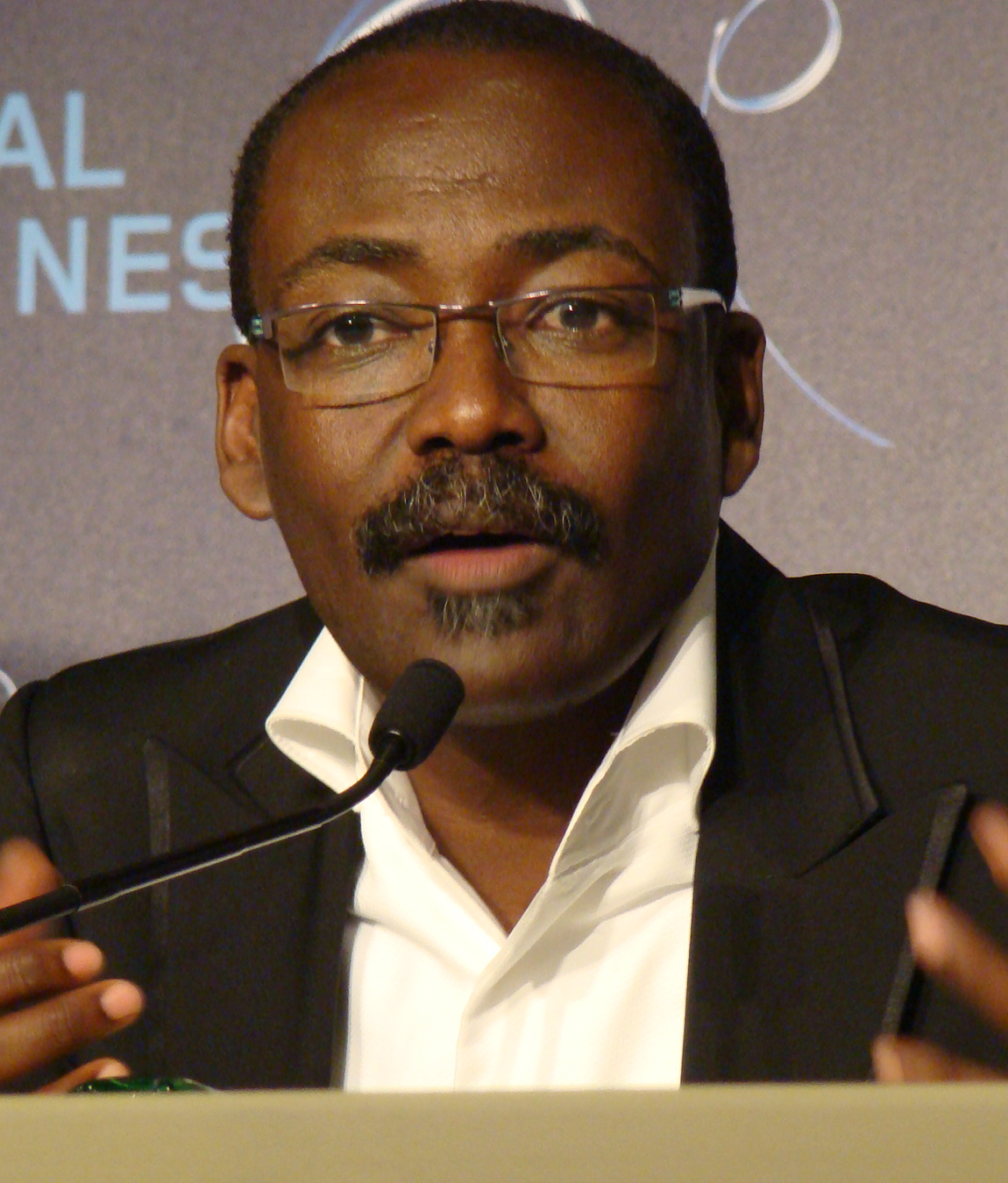
Mahamat-Saleh Haroun, widely regarded as the most prominent filmmaker in Chad

The film industry of Chad is small but growing. The first film made in the country was the 1958 John Huston adventure film The Roots of Heaven, filmed when the country was still a part of French Equatorial Africa. Documentary filmmaker Edouard Sailly made a series of shorts in the 1960s depicting daily life in the country. During this period there were a number of cinemas in the country, including Le Normandie, Le Vogue, the Rio, the Étoile and the Shéherazade in N'Djamena, the Rex in Sarh, the Logone in Moundou and the Ciné Chachati in Abéché. The film industry suffered severely in the 1970s-80s as Chad became engulfed in a series of civil wars and foreign military interventions; film production stopped, and all the cinemas in Chad closed down. Following the ousting of dictator Hissène Habré by Idriss Déby in 1990 the situation in the country stabilised somewhat, allowing the development of a nascent film industry, most notably through the work of directors Mahamat-Saleh Haroun, Issa Serge Coelo and Abakar Chene Massar. Mahamat-Saleh Haroun has won awards at the Panafrican Film and Television Festival of Ouagadougou, Venice International Film Festival and the Cannes Film Festival. In January 2011 Le Normandie in N'Djamena, said now to be the only cinema in Chad, re-opened with government support.

== List of Films Shot in Chad ==
The following is a sortable list of films produced or shot in Chad.

Year	Title	English translation	Director	Genre	Notes
1958	The Roots of Heaven	—N/a	John Huston	Adventure	American film partly shot in Chad
1960	Les Tonnes de l'Audace - Mission Ténéré Tchad	The Tons of Audacity - Mission Ténéré Tchad	René Quinet and Louis Sommet	Documentary	
1966	Pêcheurs du Chari	Fishers of the Chari	Edouard Sailly	Ethnographic short	
1966	Le Lac Tchad	Lake Chad	Edouard Sailly	Ethnographic short	
1966	Salam el Kebir	—N/a	Edouard Sailly	Ethnographic short	
1966	Les Abattoirs de Forchia	The Abattoirs of Forchia	Edouard Sailly	Ethnographic short	
1966	Largeau	—N/a	Edouard Sailly	Ethnographic short	
1967	Le Troisième Jour	The Third Day	Edouard Sailly	Drama	Short
1969	L'Enfant du Tchad	The Infant of Chad	Edouard Sailly	Ethnographic short	
1972	A la Découverte du Tchad	Discovering Chad	Edouard Sailly	Ethnographic short	
1994	Maral Tanié	—N/a	Mahamat-Saleh Haroun	Drama	Short
1994	Un Taxi pour Aouzou	A Taxi for Aouzou	Issa Serge Coelo	Drama	Short
1995	Goï-Goï	—N/a	Mahamat-Saleh Haroun	Drama	Short
1995	Dilemme au Féminin	Female Dilemma	Zara Mahamat Yacoub	Drama	TV film
1999	Bye Bye Africa	—N/a	Mahamat-Saleh Haroun	Drama	
2000	Daresalam	Let There Be Peace	Issa Serge Coelo	War drama	
2002	Abouna	Our Father	Mahamat-Saleh Haroun	Drama	
2005	Addabache Djay Wara	—N/a	Abakar Chene Massar	Drama	
2006	Daratt	Dry Season	Mahamat-Saleh Haroun	Drama	
2006	DP75: Tartina City	—N/a	Issa Serge Coelo	Drama	
2006	Kalala	—N/a	Mahamat Saleh Haroun	Documentary	
2009	Le Pèlerin de Camp Nou	Captain Majid (a literal translation would be The Pilgrim of Camp Nou)	Abakar Chene Massar	Drama	
2009	La Deliverance	—N/a	Richard Hunt	Documentary	
2010	Un homme qui crie	A Screaming Man	Mahamat-Saleh Haroun	Drama	
2013	GriGris	—N/a	Mahamat-Saleh Haroun	Drama	
2015	Parler de Rose, Prisonnière de Hissène Habré	Talking with Rose, Prisoner of Hissène Habré	Isabel Coixet	Documentary	Spanish doc shot in Chad
2017	Hissein Habré, une Tragédie Tchadienne	Hissène Habré, a Chadian Tragedy	Mahamat-Saleh Haroun	Documentary	Co-produced by Senegal, France, Netherlands and the United Kingdom
2021	Lingui, les liens sacrés	Lingui, The Sacred Bonds	Mahamat-Saleh Haroun	Drama	

== See also ==
- Culture of Chad
- List of African films
