= Youssouf Djaoro =

Chadian actor (born 1963)

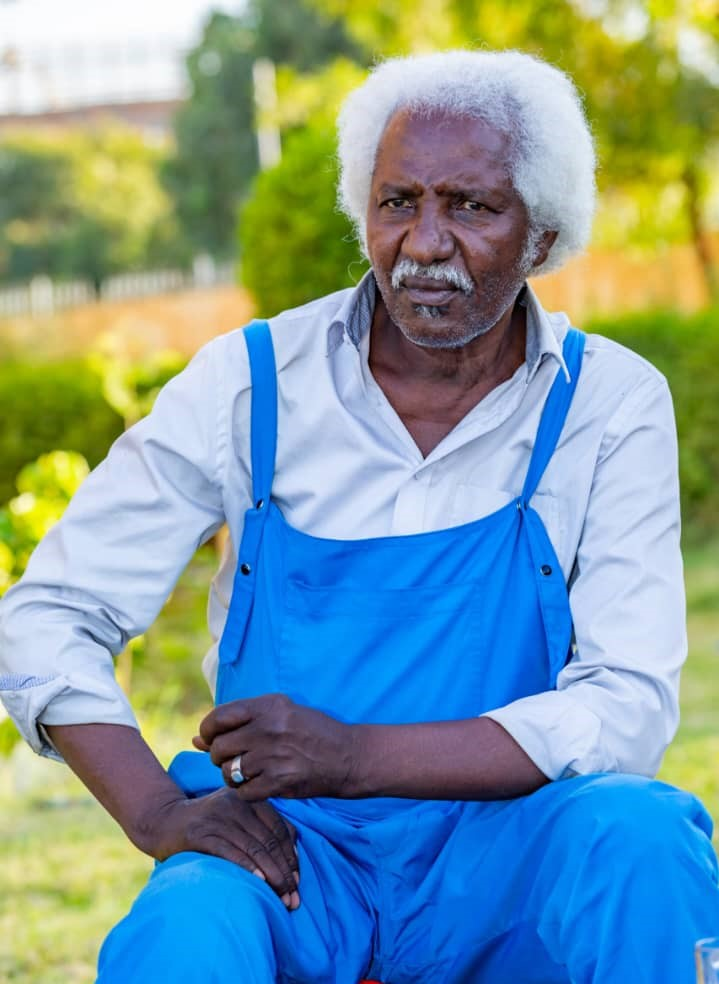
- Born: March 28, 1963 (age 63); Chad
- Occupation: Film actor
- Years active: 1992–present

Youssouf Djaoro (born 28 March 1963) is a Chadian film actor.

He made his debut by appearing in the film Daresalam in 2000 in which he played the character of Tom. It was directed by the critically acclaimed Issa Serge Coelo and was the first of several films they have collaborated with. Tartina City, also directed by Coelo in 2006 in which Djaoro played a journalist won the Innovation Award at the 31st Montreal World Film Festival.

Later in 2006 he starred in the film Daratt playing the role of Nassara. Directed by Mahamat Saleh Haroun, Darratt won the Grand Special Jury Prize at the 63rd Venice International Film Festival, as well as eight other prizes at Venice and the Panafrican Film and Television Festival of Ouagadougou. For his role in A Screaming Man, Djaoro won the Silver Hugo for best actor at the 46th Chicago International Film Festival.

== Filmography ==
- Daresalam (2000) as Tom
- Tartina City (2006)
- Daratt (2006) as Nassara
- A Screaming Man (2010) as Adam
- Ariane's Thread (2014) as Night Watchman
- Lingui, The Sacred Bonds (2021) as Brahim
