= École Supérieure de Réalisation Audiovisuelle =

Private film school in Paris

Coordinates: 48°51′N 2°21′E

École supérieure de réalisation audiovisuelle

Location
- 135 Avenue Félix Faure (France) 75015 Paris

Information
- Type: Private
- Established: 1972
- President: Max Azoulay
- Enrollment: Approximately 2000
- Campus: Urban
- Information: +33 01 44 25 25 25
- Website: http://www.esra.edu

The École supérieure de réalisation audiovisuelle is a French private film school (Paris, Nice, Rennes) which specialises in the training of cinema, television, photography, sound engineering and digital art through the DESRA (Diplôme d'études supérieures de réalisation audiovisuelle) diploma, the DESTS (Diplôme d'études supérieures des téchniques du son) and the DESFA (Diplôme d'études supérieures du film d'animation) diplomas, all accredited by the French Ministry of Higher Education and Research, and is listed in the Répertoire national des certifications professionnelles.

ESRA was created in 1972 in Paris by Max Azoulay.

Since 2007, the students can continue their studies for a fourth year in New York.

In 2007, the school created two year specialization studies (mastère) in Paris.

== Mastères ==
- Scenario : Fiction/Documentary :
  - Coordinator : Edouard Blanchot
  - Parrain fiction: Michel Alexandre
  - Parrain documentaire : Patrick Rotman
- Production/ Distribution:
  - Coordinateur: Franck Garbarz,
  - Parrains: Michel Reilhac (director of cinema Arte),
  - François Sauvagnargues (director of fiction sector Arte), Thierry Lacaze (director of FOX Searchlight sector).

== People ==
=== Notable alumni ===
- Didier Delaître (promotion 1984), director and composer : Central Nuit TV show, Éternelle, Dos au mur
- Pierre Morel (promotion 1986), director : Banlieue 13, Taken, From Paris with Love.
- David Charhon (promotion 1998), director : Cyprien, De l'autre côté du périph, Le dernier mercenaire
- Yves Darrondeau, Christophe Lioud et Emmanuel Priou (all three promotion 1987), producers : March of the Penguins (Academy Award for best documentary).
- Florent Emilio Siri (promotion 1988), director : Une minute de silence, Nid de guêpes, Hostage and L'Ennemi intime.
- Laurent Frapat (promotion 1988), director : Les Chroniques de la terre sauvage.
- Winfried Bonengel (promotion 1988), director : Les Enfants de la colère.
- Alain Benguigui (promotion 1989), producer : Bord de mer, Brodeuses, Toi et moi, Les Yeux bandés.
- Jean-François Richet (promotion 1990), director : Ma 6-T va crack-er, Assault on Precinct 13, L'Ennemi public n° 1, L'Instinct de mort.
- Karin Albou (promotion 1991), director : La Petite Jérusalem, Le chant des mariées.
- Goran Nerić (promotion 1991), director : Zona Arizona
- Gilles Jacquier (promotion 1991), journalist and reporter
- Pascal Laugier (promotion 1993), director : Saint Ange, Martyrs.
- Stéphane Robelin (promotion 1994), director : Réal Movie.
- Marc Miance (dropout), producer : Renaissance, Animal Kingdom: Let's Go Ape.
- Xavier Ruiz (promotion 1994), director : Neutre.
- Éric Toledano (promotion 1994), director : Je préfère qu'on reste amis, Nos jours heureux.
- Narjiss Nejjar (promotion 1995), director : Les Yeux secs.
- Rémi Bezançon (promotion 1995), director : Love Is in the Air (2005 film), The First Day of the Rest of Your Life, Un heureux événement.
- Alex Pilot (promotion 1995), director on Nolife (TV channel).
- Othman Naciri (promotion 2004), director : Sin Palabras, Echec et Mat.
- Vivianne Chaix (promotion ISTS 2006), sound engineer : Slumdog Millionaire (directed by Danny Boyle). Academy Award (Oscar) winner 2009 for "Best Song" and "Best Score".
- Issa Serge Coelo: Daresalam, DP75: Tartina City, Ndjamena City.
- César Ducasse, director: Lies Inc. and Mørke sjeler.
- Stéphane Robelin, director: Réal Movie.
- Carine Tardieu, director: La tête de maman
- Virginie Sauveur, director: Celle qui reste, (television films).
- Dominique Tabuteau, director: Julie Lescaut and other (TV shows)
- Virginie Sauveur, director: Frères (TV shows)
- Yann Belitti, director: 1805
- Claus Drexel, director: Affaire de famille.
- Nicolas Bary (promotion 2001), director : Les enfants de Timpelbach
- Antoine Pinson (promotion 2004), director : Aléa
- Julien Maury, director : Inside
- Yvan Sadik, producer: Le chant de la Noria
- Guillaume Raphoz, producer: Résonnances
- Charles-Henri Avelange, composer: The Age of Heroes, SIFF 35th Anniversary Tribute, Arthur and Official Best of Fest.
- Les Petits Pilous French electro music duo.
- Maxime Musqua, comedian and YouTube personality
- Vysakh Reetha, Director, Producer and Visual Effects supervisor
- Antoine Daniel, video game livestreamer, vlogger and actor
- Anthony Seklaoui, Fashion photographer and filmmaker

=== Professors ===
==== Professors of Paris ====
Professors ESRA:

Histoire du cinéma

- Vincent Amiel:

Docteur en cinématographie, Maîtrise de conférences en cinéma à l'Université de Caen.

Scénario

- Frédéric Sabouraud:

Scénariste, Licencié en Histoire, Critique aux Cahiers du Cinéma.

- Edouard Blanchot:

Diplômé du Conservatoire Européen d'écriture audiovisuelle, Ancien élève de l'ESRA

Mise en scène:

- Pierre Berthomieu:

Ancien élève de l'ENS, Agrégé de Lettres, Maîtrise de conférence d'Études cinématographiques à l'Université Paris VII

Direction artistique, production publicitaire et story-board:

- Franck Van-Leeuwen:

Directeur artistique, Ancien élève de l'École Charpentier.

Reportage :

- Frédéric Desroches:

Chef de Service à France télévision, Ancien élève de l'ESRA.

Assistanat de réalisation, régie générale et production:

- Jacques Faure:

Directeur de production. Maîtrise de psychologie.

- Pierre D'Hoffelize:

Directeur de production Long Métrage, Enseignant chargé de cours à l'Université Paris III.

Technique cinéma et Lumière:

- Denis Morel:

Directeur de la Photographie, Ancien élève de Louis Lumière.

- Patrice Guillou:

Chef opérateur, Ancien élève de Louis Lumière.

Culture Musicale:

- Christian Lotito:

Maîtrise de musicologie, Chef d'orchestre, Compositeur et Arrangeur.

Anglais:

- Mathilda Aelion:

Maîtrise de réalisation cinéma et télévision, USC, CAPES of English.

Professors ISTS:

Technologie des équipements, technique son:

- Hervé Baudier:

Ingénieur E.E.M.S., Sound Engineer.

Esthétique sonore et technique de mise en œuvre:

- Nicolas Mercier et Bertrand Come:

Sound Engineers.

Techniques de prise de son sonorisation:

- Pierre-Yves Guyomard:

Sound Engineer.

Acoustique et son audiovisuel:

- François Libault:

Ancien élève de Louis Lumière.

Acoustique et physique appliquée:

- Olivier Calvet:

Dea d'acoustique appliquée agrégé de mécanique.

Culture Artistique:

- Bruno Guiganti:

Dea de philosophie, Acousmaticien.

Electronique appliquée:

- Eric Samama:

Dut de génie électrique option électronique et informatique industrielle.

Anglais:

- Corinne Ladet:

Maîtrise d'anglais, USF.

- Mathilda AELION

Réalisation artistique:

- Jean-Christophe Belval:

Réalisateur artistique, compositeur, arrangeur et ingénieur du son.

Culture générale Mise en scène:

- Camille Gendrault:

Docteur auprès de l'Université de Paris I.

Professors SUP'INFOGRAPH:

Histoire du cinéma:

- Vincent AMIEL:

Docteur en cinématographie, Maîtrise de conférences en cinéma à l'Université de Caen.

Direction artistique production publicitaire et story-board:

- Franck VAN-LEEUWEN:

Directeur artistique, Ancien élève de l'École Charpentier.

Technique lumière:

- Patrice GUILLOU:

Directeur de la Photographie Ancien élève de Louis Lumière.

Image 3 D:

- Edouard Aoun:

Diplômé des Beaux-Arts, Maîtrise d'Arts Plastiques, DEA d'Esthétiques et Sciences de l'Art (la Sorbonne), DESS d'Images de synthèse 3D.

- Franck Parisis:

Infographiste 3D, Chef décorateur

- Nicolas Galvini Infographiste 3D, Animateur, Chef de projet.

Anglais:

- Corinne LADET

Dessin:

- Jean Bernard Pouchous

Diplôme National des Beaux-Arts Prix Villa Médicis

- Frédéric Jacquin

Diploma of the Gerrit Rietveld Academie.

Scénario:

- Mathieu Masmondet:

CEEA, an ESRA previous student.

Esthétique de l'image:

- Carle Wrona:

Doctorat de recherches cinématographiques et audiovisuelles Paris III.

Histoire du Dessin animé:

- Bernard Genin:

Chef de rubrique Ciné Télé, Diplômé des Beaux-Arts.

Mise en scène:

- Olivier Cotte:

Historien du film d'animation, journaliste pour le cinéma d'animation et les images numériques, diplômé des Beaux-Arts.

==== Professors of Nice ====
Professors ISTS:

Technique Son:

- Jean Pourchier: Full Sail University
- Frédéric Garnero: graduate of Centre National de Création Musicale (CIRM) in Nice. Régisseur son at Théâtre National de Nice.

Production:

- Stephen Taylor: Berklee College of Music Official website

Culture Musicale:

- Bernard Guiraud: Louis Lumière College.,

Illustration Musicale au Cinéma:

- Stéphane Chanudaud: give lessons at University of Provence

Design Sonore:

- Luc Martinez

==== Professors of Rennes ====
Mise en scène, Scénario:

- Hervé Morzadec: IDHEC

Perception de l'espace:

- Boris Volant: Maîtrise d'art plastiques, DEA Histoire et critique des arts.

Histoire du cinéma:

- Jean-Pierre Eugène: CAPES musical education, Maîtrise in Musicology and author of La musique dans les films d'Alfred Hitchcock

Technique sonore:

- Hervé Jegaden: Production sound mixer, director of Drop Studio

Histoire de la BD:

- Marc Legrand: professional comic book creator.

==== Notable lecturers ====
- Gilles Tinayre, composer of Chouchou, and previous president of the French Film Composers' Association.
- Guy Reibel: electroacoustic music and acousmatic composer trained under Olivier Messiaen, Conservatoire de Paris, Groupe de Recherches Musicales

== Curiosity ==
- Ronin, a 1998 movie by John Frankenheimer, was set in the French Riviera and a shooting scene at the harbour of Nice was shot in front of the school.
