= Maïmouna Miawama =

Chadian actress

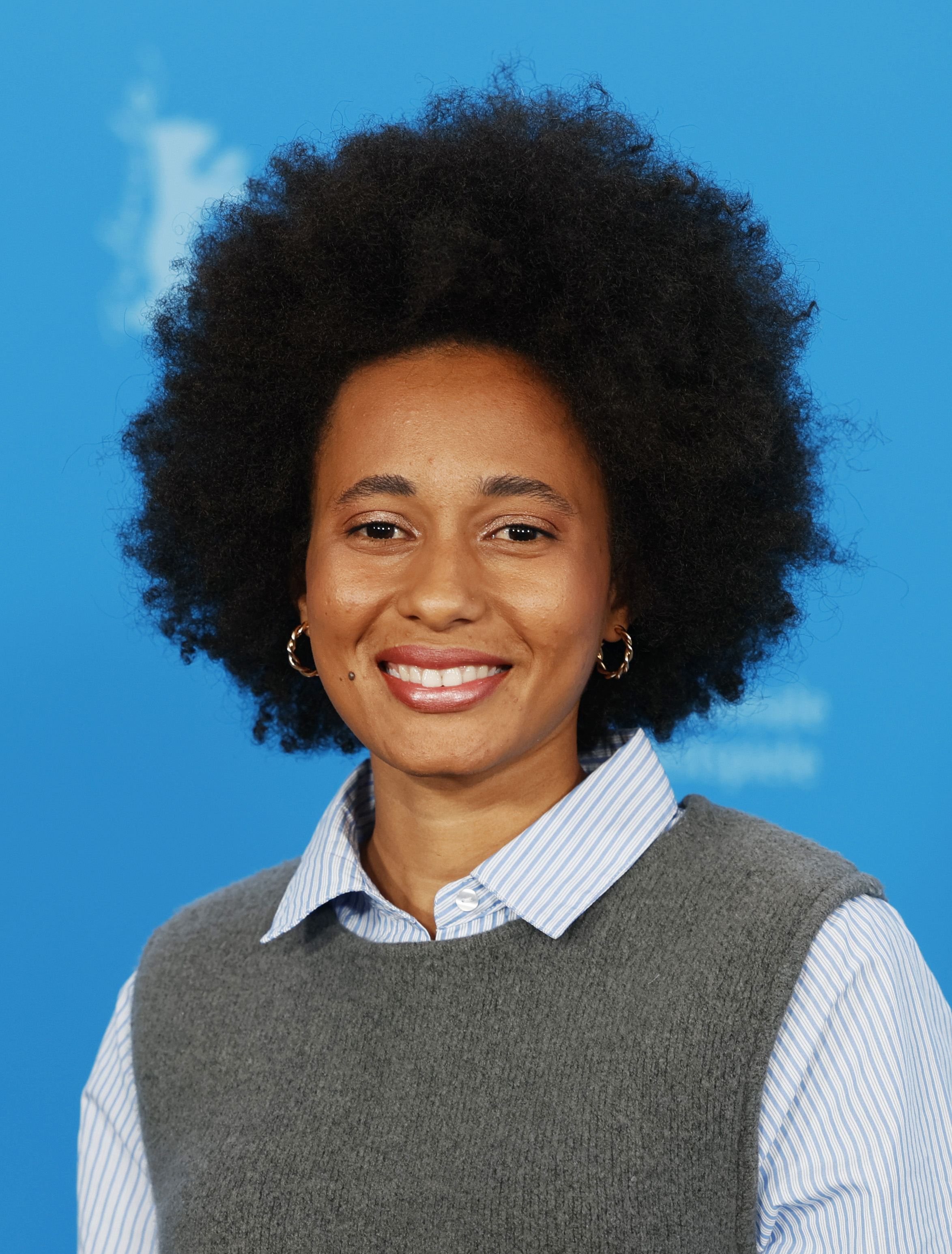
- Maïmouna Miawama at the Berlinale 2026
- Born: Maïmouna Miawama; N'Djamena
- Occupation: Actress
- Notable work: Soumsoum, the Night of the Stars

Maïmouna Miawama is a Chadian actress who starred in the film Soumsoum, the Night of the Stars directed by Mahamat Saleh Haroun.

== Role in Soumsoum, the Night of the Stars ==
Soumsoum, the Night of the Stars is a Franco-Chadian co-production, with a screenplay co-written by Mahamat Saleh Haroun and Laurent Gaudé. The story follows Kellou, haunted by visions in a remote village in Chad, who, after meeting the exiled Aya, seeks to reconnect with her past and regain her freedom. The film was in competition at the 76th Berlinale. This 101-minute drama stars Miawama, Eriq Ebouaney and Achouackh Abakar Souleymane. The film explores contemporary Chad, social conflicts, and themes of the miraculous and the unseen.

== See also ==
- Laurent Gaudé
- Mahamat-Saleh Haroun
- Soumsoum, the Night of the Stars
