= Achouackh Abakar Souleymane =

Chadian Actress

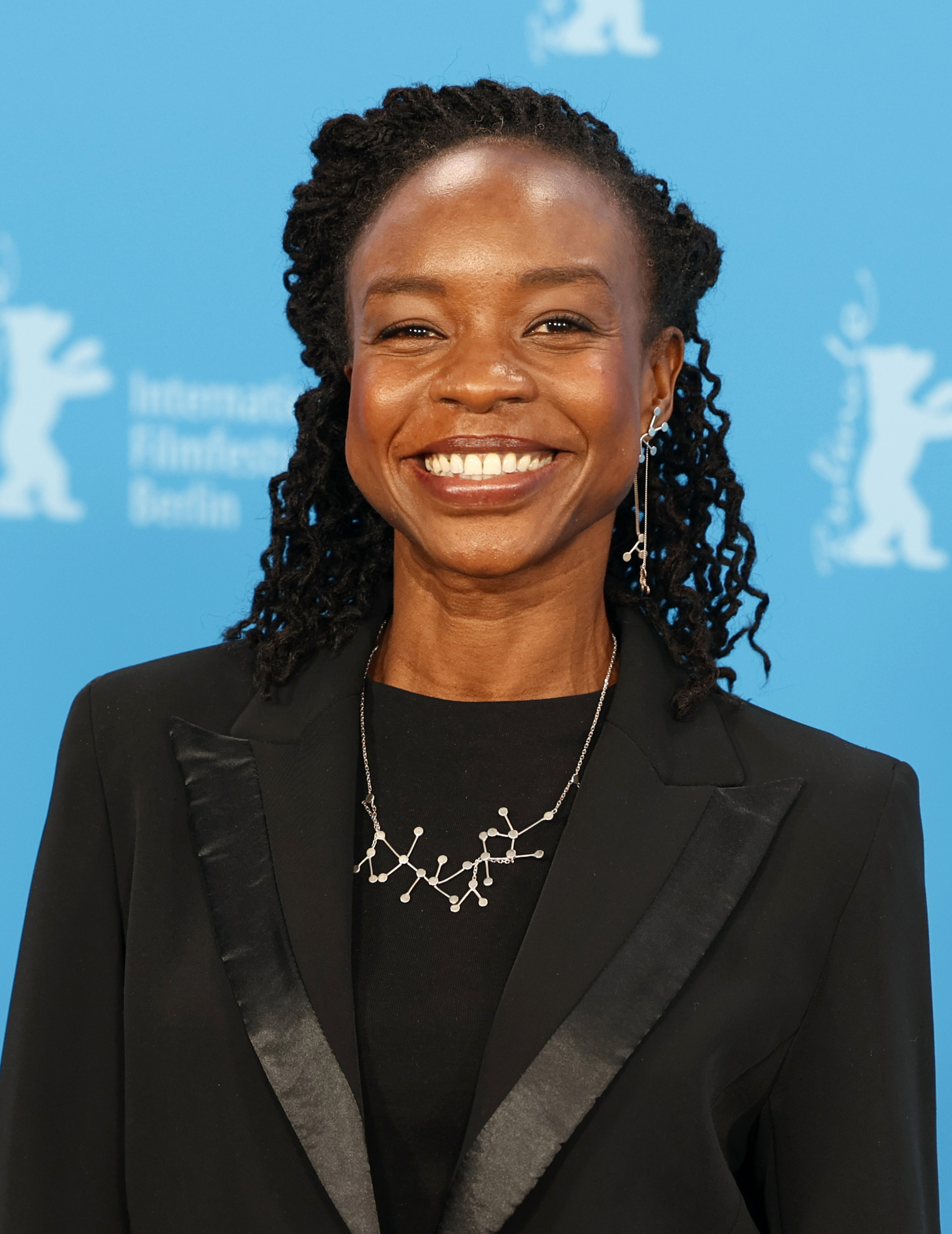
- Achouackh Abakar Souleymane at Berlinale 2026
- Born: c. 1982
- Occupation: Actor
- Awards: Chevalier des Arts et des Lettres

Achouackh Abakar Souleymane (born c. 1982) is a Chadian actress.

Achouackh Abakar Souleymane studied journalism in Chad. She moved to the United States at the age of 17 and worked in fashion for thirteen years before returning to Chad.

Souleymane was working as an assistant costumier on the film GriGris (2013) when director Mahamat Saleh Haroun cast her in a small role in two scenes, her film debut.

She starred in a lead role in Haroun's Lingui, The Sacred Bonds (2021), where she played Amina, a poor single mother in N’Djamena who helps her daughter (Rihane Khalil Alio) get an abortion. Souleymane received international attention after Lingui was selected to compete for the Palme d'Or at the 2021 Cannes Film Festival.

In Haroun's Soumsoum, the Night of the Stars (2026), Souleymane plays Aya, who befriends the teenage protagonist, Kellou (Maïmouna Miawana). The film premiered at the 76th Berlin International Film Festival in February 2026.

== Awards and honors ==
In 2023, Achouackh Abakar Souleymane was awarded the Chevalier des Arts et des Lettres by the French government.

== Filmography ==
- 2013: GriGris (dir. Mahamat Saleh Haroun)
- 202 : Lingui, les liens sacrés (dir. Mahamat Saleh Haroun)
- 202 : Soumsoum, la nuit des astres (dir. Mahamat Saleh Haroun)
