= Goran Nerić =

Handball player and filmmaker

Goran Nerić (born in Goražde, Yugoslavia) is an international (Canada, France, USA) filmmaker and cinematographer.

His documentary film "Zona Arizona" was awarded at the festival "Traces de vies" (Rencontres du film documentaire) at Clermont-Ferrand, France. For this film, he draws inspiration from culturally diverse sources of former Yugoslavia and tries to show that the common life between belligerents is still possible on this soil, destroyed by civil war tragedy.

In 2005, his film "Champion’s Zone" (La Zone des Champions) for which he was credited as the writer and directing consultant, was nominated by the Academy of Canadian Cinema and Television for a Gémeaux award in the Best Sports Program.

He graduated in Film Directing from the ESRA Paris - Côte d'Azur (Ecole Supérieure de Realisation Audiovisuelle) and holds a master's degree (M.A.) in Film Studies from the University of Montreal and a bachelor's degree in Economic Sciences.

In his youth, Nerić participated in international sport competitions. He is a former Yugoslavian handball player and Olympian.
