= Marc Miance =

French film and television producer

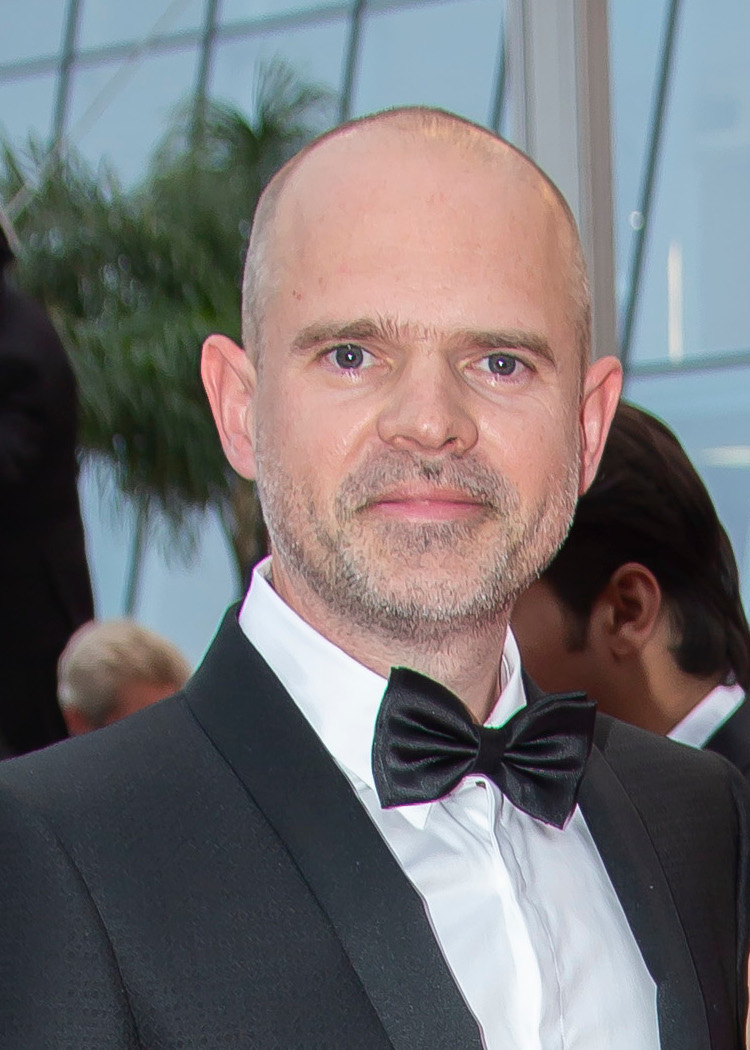
- Marc Miance in 2019.
- Born: 6 September 1976 (age 49); Meulan, France
- Education: ESRA
- Occupation: Film producer
- Years active: 1997–present
- Spouse: Isabelle Miance

Marc Miance (born 6 September 1976 in Meulan, France) is a film and television producer. He is the founder and CEO of Alkymia since 2010. He produced animated feature films such as Renaissance (2006) and Animal Kingdom: Let's Go Ape (2015).

== Biography ==
Marc Miance was born in Meulan, in the suburbs of Paris. He developed an interest in computer-generated imagery (CGI) and video games at an early age. He studied at the ESRA school of cinema where he specialized in computer graphics, but dropped out after 2 years. He started to develop new techniques to create black and white CGI movies (Project BW).

In 2000, Miance co-founded Attitude Studio, a production company specialized in film animations. Attitude Studio created Eve Solal, an entirely computer-generated realistic character who was intended to star in films, TV shows, and video-games. Attitude Studio innovated by developing an "emotion mapper" for the Eve Solal character, i.e. sets of body movements for each emotion triggered to make the animation less stiff, more human-like. He sold Eve Solal to the telecom company Orange for 1 billion francs the same year that it launched, in 2000. The following year, he showcased Eve Solal to ACM's Siggraph.

From 2003 to 2005, he worked on several video game animations including Eidos' Tomb Raider: The Angel of Darkness and Atari's Terminator 3: Rise of the Machines. In 2004, inspired by Frank Miller's Sin City, he created the visual concept of the black-and-white sci-fi animation film Renaissance, directed by Christian Volckman, and was in charge of the animation. Still in 2005, he co-founded the production company Let'So Ya with Isabelle Miance (spouse) and Sandrine de Sacy. Attitude Studio, now equipped with a 3,500m² motion capture studio near Paris, led a 4-million euro round of investment in 2008, and closed its operations in April 2009.

In 2010, Miance became the executive producer of Animal Kingdom: Let's Go Ape released in 2015 and starring Jamel Debbouze, the first European picture to be entirely filmed using motion capture. In 2010, Miance also created the company Alkymia specialized in computer graphics and motion-animated technologies, a company which was instrumental to develop the technology for the movie Animal Kingdom: Let's Go Ape, including a 500-gram headset to capture the facial expressions of the actors.

In 2019, Miance and Indian producer Anish Mulani launched the mobile browser Popshot. In 2020, they focused the application on user privacy and renamed it Wave.

== Filmography ==
Films
1998	BW
2006	Renaissance
2015	Animal Kingdom: Let's Go Ape

Television
2003	A Species Odyssey (documentary)
2006	Skyland
2006	Galactik Football (season 1)
2009	Galactik Football (season 2)

Video games (cinematics)
2003	Tomb Raider: The Angel of Darkness	Eidos Interactive
2003	Terminator 3: Rise of the Machines	Atari
2003	Spawn: Armageddon	Namco
2005	50 Cent: Bulletproof	Vivendi Games
2005	Marc Ecko's Getting Up: Contents Under Pressure	Atari Inc
2005	Dungeons & Dragons: Dragonshard	Atari Inc
2008	Robert Ludlum's The Bourne Conspiracy	ivendi Games
2009	Wheelman	Midway Games, Ubisoft
2009	Grey's Anatomy	Ubisoft
