= Un taxi pour Aouzou =

1994 Chadian short drama film

- Directed by: Issa Serge Coelo
- Written by: Issa Serge Coelo
- Produced by: Dominique Andreani
- Starring: Abdoulaye Ahmat; Ali Baba Nour
- Cinematography: Pascal Poucet
- Edited by: Stéphanie Mahé; Agnès Bruckert
- Music by: Safy Boutella
- Production company: Movimento Production
- Release date: 1994
- Running time: 22 minutes
- Countries: France; Chad
- Language: French

Un taxi pour Aouzou (A Taxi for Aouzou), is a 1994 Chadian short drama film directed by Issa Serge Coelo and produced by Dominique Andreani for Movimento Production. The film stars Abdoulaye Ahmat and Ali Baba Nour. The film revolves around Abdoulaye Ahmat, a Libyan woman falls in love with Ali Baba Nour, a Chadian man at the time of the Libyan-Chadian conflict.

The film has been shot in and around N'Djaména, Chad. The film made its premier on 20 August 2021. The film received mixed reviews from critics.

== Cast ==
- Abdoulaye Ahmat
- Ali Baba Nour
