= Xavier Ruiz =

Swiss film director and producer (born 1970)

Xavier Ruiz (born 1970 in Geneva, Switzerland) is a Swiss film director and producer.

== Education ==
From 1992 to 1994, he studied at ESRA (Ecole supérieure de réalisation audiovisuelle) in Paris and obtained a BTS in production. Then, he took classes from the workshop AVID, Video and Arts - New York in 1995.

== Career ==
From 1992 to 1999, he produced and line-produced a dozen short films, such as Perfect Day by Reza Rezaï and Talon d’Achille by Nicholas Cuthbert. In 1994, he became unit manager for a Canal + TV series and in 1995-96, he worked as international sales manager at Fox Lorber in New York. He continues to work in the marketing department at New Concorde/Horizon in Los Angeles.

He directs in 1997 a TV mini-series titled The Toilette Zone. In 1997, Hamster production hired him as unit manager for a TV series broadcast on France 2. From 1996 until 2001, he worked as freelance editor for television and feature films.

In 2001, he directed and produced his first feature film, Neutre that is released on Swiss cinema screens the same year, then on television in 2003 and on DVD throughout Switzerland. Neutre was screened in many festivals, among others Montréal, Mar del Plata, Hof, Brunswick and Geneva. At the same time, he formed his production company. He then directed a music video for a Swiss rap band Sens Unik.

In 2003, he directed two documentaries for the series PHOTOsuisse for the Télévision Suisse Romande (TSR). In 2004, he produced Elena Hazanov’s first feature film Love Express that was distributed in French-speaking Switzerland as of September 1. The same year, he co-produced with the TSR the documentary Geisha, The Twilight of Flowers, broadcast on TSR2 on December 6, 2004 and sold to numerous TV channels. He produced Ryna, Ruxandra Zenide’s first feature, released in Swiss theaters in 2006 and selected in many festivals, where it won numerous awards, among others at Cinéma Tout Ecran, Mannheim-Heidelberg, Tromso, Annonay and Milan.

In 2005, he also directed the documentary Swiss Made in Hollywood, which relates to the actual experiences of three young Swiss people who try to build their career in Hollywood. The TSR broadcast it twice in May 2005 and TV5 in May and August 2005. The same year, he directed an episode of the series DESIGNsuisse about the designer Yves Béhar. At the same time, he starts writing with Nicholas Cuthbert the screenplay of his second feature film Verso.

His production company Navarro Films joins in March 2006 the group of European producers Tarantula, present in France, Luxembourg, Belgium and Great Britain, and officially became Tarantula Suisse. Xavier Ruiz has finished his second feature film Verso and directed the Swiss version of Spitting Image, named Les Bouffons de la Confédération. He's a full-time director with his co-director Jean-Paul Cardinaux. In 2015, he and his partner co-directed "Sweet Girls", the first swiss feature film that was released on Amazon Prime Video, in 2018.

== Filmography ==
=== Director ===
- Feature Film Sweet Girls, 103 min
- TV Series Les Bouffons de la Confédération, 38x12 min
- Music Video Stress - V, 4 min
- Feature Film Verso, 100 min
- Feature Film Neutre, 92 min
- Documentary DesignSuisse, 12 min
- Documentary Swiss made in Hollywood, 52 min
- Documentary PhotoSuisse, 2x12 min
- Music Video SENS UNIK - Dans le creux de sa main, 5 min
- TV Series The Toilette Zone, 6x2 min

=== Producer ===
- Feature Documentary Cri de l'Ame de Dominique Othenin-Girard, 64 min
- Feature Film Sweet Girls, 103 min
- TV Series Les Bouffons de la Confédération, 38x12 min
- Music Video Stress - V, 4 min
- Feature Film 'Verso', 100 min
- Feature Film Ryna de Ruxandra Zenide, 90 min
- Feature Film Love Express, de Elena Hazanov, 100 min
- Feature Film Neutre, de Xavier Ruiz, 92 min
- Feature Documentary Togo de Pierre Morath et Nioclas Peart, 80 min
- Documentary Geisha, le crépuscule des fleurs de Romain Guélat, 52 min
- Documentary DesignSuisse, 12 min
- Documentary Swiss made in Hollywood, 52 min
- Documentary PhotoSuisse, 2x12 min
- TV Series La Tribu, 10x9 min
- TV Series The Toilette Zone, 6x2 min
- Documentary Series Onoma, Expo 02, 12x6 min
- Music Video SENS UNIK - C'est la vie, 5 min
- Music Video SENS UNIK - Dans le creux de sa main, 5 min
- Short Film Week-end Break, 14 min
- Short Film Perfect Day, 20 min
- Short Film Talon d'Achille 14 min
- Short Film The Barber, 10 min
- Short Film Dieu que pour toi, 10 min
- Short Film Tango Lola, 6 min
