= Bye Bye Africa =

- Screenshot
- Directed by: Mahamat Saleh Haroun
- Written by: Mahamat Saleh Haroun
- Starring: Mahamat Saleh Haroun; Garba Issa; Aïcha Yelena; Abakar Mahamat-Saleh
- Cinematography: Stephane Legoux, Mahamat Saleh Haroun
- Edited by: Sarah Taouss Matton
- Music by: Al-hadj Ahmat dit Pecos; Issa Bongo; Ringo Efoua-Ela
- Distributed by: California Newsreel (USA); Les Histoires Weba (France)
- Release date: September 1999 (Venice)
- Running time: 86 minutes
- Countries: France; Chad
- Languages: Arabic, French
- Budget: ~USD100,000

Bye Bye Africa is a 1999 award-winning Chadian film. It was the first by Chadian director Mahamat Saleh Haroun, who also starred. The docu-drama centers on a fictionalized version of Haroun.

== Plot ==
A Chadian film director who lives and works in France (Haroun) returns home upon the death of his mother. He is shocked at the degraded state of the country and the national cinema. Encountering skepticism from his family members about his chosen career, Haroun tries to defend himself by quoting Jean-Luc Godard: "The cinema creates memories." The filmmaker decides to make a film dedicated to his mother entitled Bye Bye Africa but immediately encounters major problems. Cinemas have closed and financing is impossible to secure. The director reunites with an old girlfriend (Yelena), who was shunned by Chadians who could not distinguish between film and reality after appearing in one of his previous films as an HIV victim. Haroun learns about the destruction of the African cinema from directors in neighboring countries, but also finds Issa Serge Coelo shooting his first film, Daresalam. Things go badly and, convinced that it is impossible to make films in Africa, Haroun departs Chad, leaving his film camera to a young boy who had been following him around with a self-made toy camera.

== Cast ==
- Mahamat Saleh Haroun : Haroun (the director)
- Garba Issa : Garba (Haroun's friend)
- Aicha Yelena : Isabelle (Haroun's ex-lover)
- Abakar Mahamat-Saleh : Ali (the young boy)
- Khayar Oumar Defallah : the father
- Abderaman Koulamallah : the producer
- Issa Serge Coelo : Serge

== Awards ==
The film won the following awards:

- 1999 Amiens International Film Festival: Special Mention in the category Best Feature Film
- 2000 Kerala International Film Festival: FIPRESCI Prize (tied with Deveeri (1999))
- 1999 Venice Film Festival:'CinemAvvenire' Award in the category Best First Film, Luigi De Laurentiis Award - Special Mention
