= Gaoui =

Gaoui خاوي
- Village
- Location in Chad
- Coordinates: 12°10′44″N 15°08′54″E
- Country: Chad
- Region: Chari-Baguirmi Region
- Elevation: 296 m (971 ft)
- Time zone: UTC+01:00 (WAT)

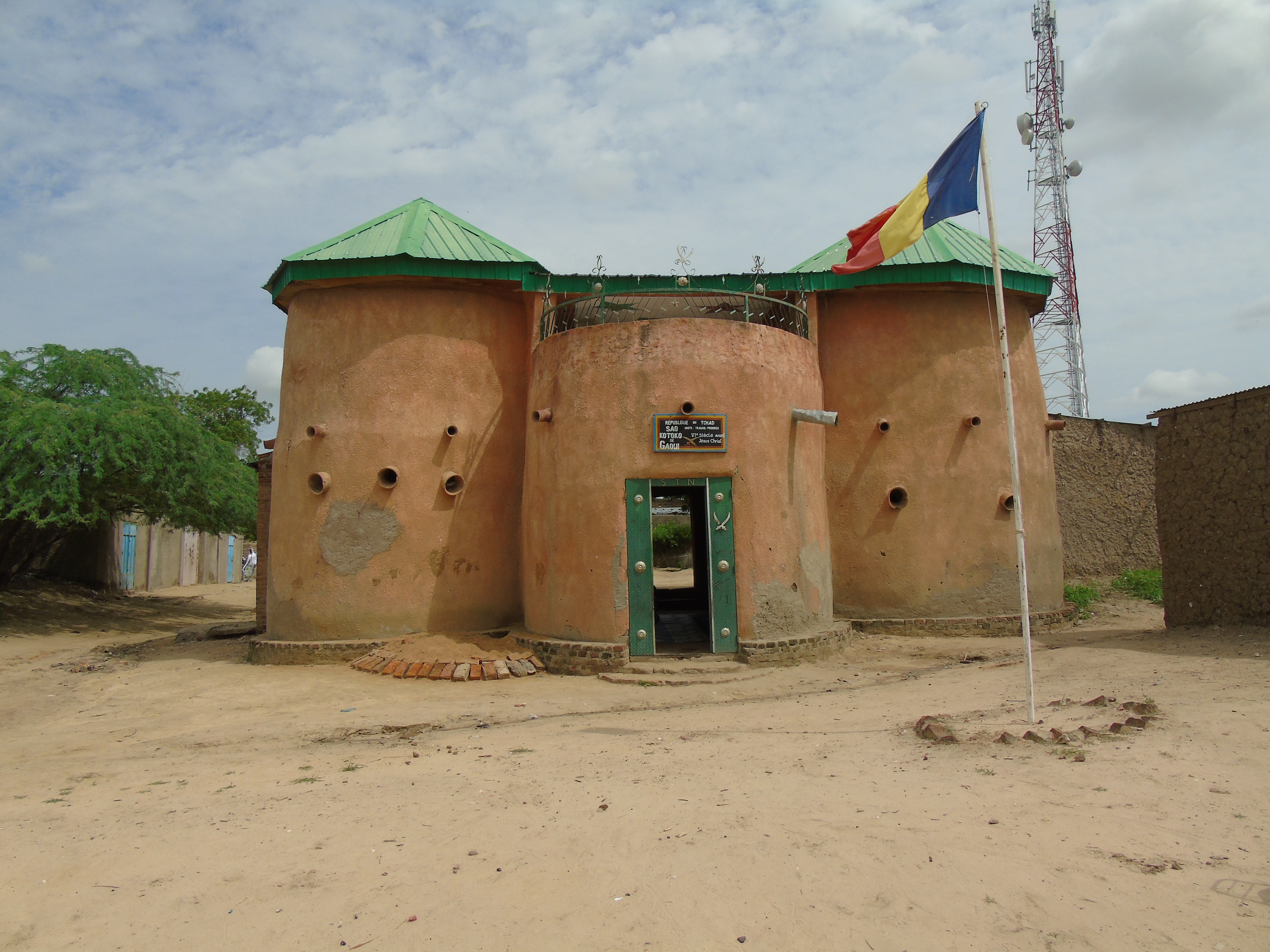
An image of a building in Gaoui.

Gaoui (Arabic: خاوي) is a village in Chad, lying 10km north east of N'Djamena. It is said to have been the capital of the Sao civilisation (a race of giants in local folklore) and is now known for its traditional architecture and pottery manufacture. It is also home to a museum.

The 2003 film Abouna was partly filmed in the village.
