= Skyland =

- Genre: Action-adventure; Drama; Science fiction
- Created by: Emmanuel Gorinstein; Alexandre de La Patellière; Mathieu Delaporte
- Starring: Tim Hamaguchi; Phoebe McAuley
- Composer: Paul Intson
- Countries of origin: France; Canada
- Original languages: French; English
- No. of seasons: 2
- No. of episodes: 26

Production
- Executive producers: Aton Soumache; Alexis Vonarb; Vince Commisso; Steve Jarosz; Lilan Eche; Tapaas Chakravarti
- Producers: Marilyn McAuley; Cedric Pilot
- Running time: 22 minutes
- Production companies: Method Films; 9 Story Entertainment

Original release
- Network: France 2 (France); Teletoon (Canada)
- Release: November 26, 2005 – May 25, 2007

Skyland (full French title: "Skyland, Le Nouveau Monde", or "Skyland, The New World"), is an animated television series developed in France in partnership with Canada and Luxembourg for television channels France 2 in France, Teletoon in Canada, Nicktoons in the United States, ABC in Australia and CITV in the United Kingdom. The show is a co-production between Paris's Method Films and Toronto's 9 Story Entertainment.

A 60-minute, worldwide preview was aired on November 26, 2005, at multiple times during the day and the following day. The program was hosted by Chase Francisco. It was launched on April 22, 2006, at 7:30 p.m. on Teletoon. On July 2, 2006, an encore of the one-hour pilot aired on Nicktoons Network, with the full series commencing on Saturday, November 18, 2006.

== Plot ==
Prior to the beginning of the story, in the 23rd century, the Earth has shattered into billions of pieces which orbit around a central core. In this new world, named Skyland, an evolved form of human has appeared: Seijins, who absorb energy from sunlight and use it to fuel special abilities such as telekinesis, telepathy, mental control, astral projection, energy balls or blasts, and electric rays.

The Skyland is ruled by the Sphere: an organization which controls the water supplies, and maintains its power by Guardians, Seijins indoctrinated and trained from childhood. This dictatorship is fought by pirates. After the capture of their mother by the Sphere, protagonists Mahad and Lena, a young Seijin still learning to control her powers, are rescued by a group of pirates, and join the pirate rebellion.

== Characters ==
=== Main ===
(Left to right) Mahad, The Vector, Aran Cortes, Lena

- Mahad (voice: Tim Hamaguchi, performer: Julien Girbig) – Age 17. Mahad is full of life, a show off, likable, charming, full of himself and adventurous. When he was younger, he was always unhappy because he did not have a father and his mother was a lot like Lena. In pilot school, he was always in detention due to making extreme moves on the simulator. Though not a Seijin, his goal is to free his mother. Until that time, he will slug it out with the Sphere. Though young, Mahad is unequalled as a pilot of his father's ship the Hyperion and after him, he is the best pilot in all of Skyland. Though his younger sister, Lena, always insists Dahlia is "too old for him", Mahad keeps trying to convince Dahlia he's the guy for her. He has enormous, often misplaced, self-confidence. His weapon of choice is his boomerang.
- Lena (voice: Phoebe McAuley, performer: Christelle Ouvrard) – Age 12. Intelligent, reasonable, calm but determined, impetuous. When someone she loves is in danger, Lena is a very mature, and formidable, 12-year-old girl. She alternates between carefree playing and grim determination. Adventure is not an end in itself, only a necessary step along the way. Lena is a powerful Seijin, believed by Oslo to be the 'Lady of Light' from the prophecy. She has the powers of telekinesis and telepathy, as well as other abilities such as powering energy and creating energy bolts and balls, projecting memories, and remotely sensing the presence of things and people. She can even levitate herself to great heights, as seen during an aerial battle with Diwan in the episode Heart of the Arena. She is beginning to control her telekinesis, but it tires her quickly. She has still very little control over her telepathy.
- Aran Cortes (voice: Jack Langedijk, performer: Dominic Gould) – Age 37. Gruff, moody, severe and just, with a tendency to be blasé (but still a rebel deep down). He's aware of his responsibilities as "father figure" and protector of Puerto Angel. Often complains that he has no idea why he listens to "kids" (particularly Mahad and Lena). He tends to show his anger physically, often punching a wall or banging his fist on a console when frustrated. Cortes was part of the original Pirate Rebellion and knew Marcus Farrell "by reputation." His weapon of choice is a shotgun. In the English dub, he has a dubious Scottish accent. Despite wearing his uniform with the Pirate crest even when "off duty" in Puerto Angel, Cortes "personalizes" it with a Tartan instead of a belt. He knew Cheng's mother before she was supposedly killed, and seemed to have had a soft spot for her.
- Cheng (voice: Cameron Ansell, performer: Max Gruber and Emile Kaczorowski) – Age 12. Cheng, despite his incredible intellect, is really still a child. He loves to fool around: missions are like video games in the great outdoors and he loves to play practical jokes on people. He is a very good hacker. He'll do anything for attention, like speaking in rhymes. He also has a crush on Celia. Cortes is his foster father. His parents were Pirate scientists that he believes are deceased. He thinks his only living relative is his grandfather, Tybald Ye, a scientist who is truly on the Pirates' side but pretends to be a Sphere supporter. His weapon of choice is a laser bazooka.
- Dahlia (voice: Alyson Court, performer: Tadrina Hocking) – Age 20. She has moved into the world of adults but is nevertheless attracted to Mahad's rebellious and youthful spirit, as well as his love for freedom. She finds Mahad's arrogance both irritating and appealing, which sets an interesting tension between them. She seems to enjoy giving Mahad grief. In "Eye of the storm", she nearly kissed Mahad had Lena not saved them. She often acts "serious" in order to distinguish herself from the "kids" but she breaks down from time to time and shows her mischievous side. She is proud to fight alongside Cortes and protect the people of Puerto Angel. She is a valued member of the pirates. Her weapon of choice is an energy bow and arrow. Mahad and others who disobey her are often quick to see the sharp side of her tongue.
- Diwan (voice: Athena Karkanis, performer: Lena Kowksi) – Age 25. Female master of highly developed Seijin powers, but not at Oslo's level. Appointed by Oslo to personally capture Lena. She's bald and has a red tattoo above her left eye and eyeshadow on both. Currently, Diwan would do anything to show her devotion to Oslo, who treats her like garbage in return. She controls the Brigadiers. While she was a captive of the Pirates, Diwan tried to escape but was cast off in the groundless Skyland, despite Dahlia's attempts to save her.
- Marcus Farrell – Former leader of the Pirate Rebellion. He is the father of Mahad and Lena, partner to Mila. Back when he was Mahad's age, he stole water from the Sphere in broad daylight. Mila and Oslo were sent to capture him and Mila got to him first. He helped Mila to see what the Sphere truly is, and they ran away together. Through their combined efforts, they built up the rebellion in six years, posing a real threat to the Sphere. He mysteriously disappeared during an attack on the Sphere leaving the Pirate Rebellion in disarray. Mahad and Lena discover in episode 10 that he may have survived, and might be hiding on one of the last free blocks.
- Mila (voice: Alex Belcourt, performer: Julie Delaurenti) – Age 35. Mahad and Lena's mother. Kept in hiding on the Sphere Block, Babylonia, she appears rarely and always in a very symbolic way. Her children only discover her heroic past (from the Vector and Hailong Zalo) after she is abducted. She used to hide in ships like a little stowaway. She was taken to the Sphere Academy of her own free will. She was a highly gifted former student in the Guardian School, where she spent time with Oslo. On her first mission with Oslo, they were sent to capture Marcus Farrell. She got to him first. She chose to renounce her exceptionally strong paranormal powers, as well as many privileges, when she decided not to help the Sphere after seeing how terrible it was. After leaving, she met up with Marcus Farrell and they married. She gave birth to her son Mahad and was about to give birth to Lena when Marcus vanished, crippling the Pirate Rebellion. She knew Oslo would find her again, so Mila decided to go into hiding and raise her children as a Mansa farmer without using her powers. She is a complex mix of Mahad's indomitable personality and Lena's exceptional powers. She was saved by Mahad and Lena in Kharzem Fortress.
- Oslo (voice: Juan Chioran, performer: Simon Flossaut Masnay) – Age 35. Brother of Darius, Comes from Vandegaard, a Scandinavian block. Leader of the Guardians and Commander of the Sphere. He knew Mila back in the Sphere Academy. They were best friends, inseparable. On their first mission together, they were sent to capture Marcus Farrell. When he found Mila, he attempted to turn her to fulfill the Prophecy, rule all of Skyland and take control of the Sphere. After hearing that her daughter was far more powerful, he decided to capture Lena. Absolute master of his highly developed Seijin powers. Oslo is able to use his powers in the dark and light by keeping himself exposed to sunlight night and day. Mila said that being able to use his powers in the dark would destroy him from the inside. He is a rival to Marcus, in that Marcus "stole" Mila from him. He told Lena Marcus was alive but she found it hard to believe. It is slightly obvious that Oslo has strong feelings for Mila, though she does not for him.
- The Vector (voice: William Colgate, performer: Olivier Breuils) – Age 60. A very intelligent smart man. The Vector has always lived as a recluse and was almost never interested in the "practical" aspects of life. He is eccentric and often unaware of danger. He is often pensive, daydreaming and lost in his thoughts. He rarely leaves his lighthouse on Puerto Angel. He taught Lena how to use her powers. The Vector has mapped Skyland, though it is incomplete. He helped Mila escape the Sphere Academy.
- Wayan (voice: Milton Barnes, performer Pete Thias) – Age 30. Wayan is Cortes' First Lieutenant. He is an excellent marksman, capable of total concentration and self-mastery during a battle. Conversely, he is much less organized in real life. Although he is talkative, a joker and a great storyteller, his perpetual optimism does not detract from his mastery of weapons and inborn sense of adventure which he satisfies with his mountain climbing exploits. Sometimes it seems he's Cortes' kid brother that he never had. His weapon of choice is a Shock Blaster.

=== Supporting ===
- Alice is a recently graduated Guardian who crash-landed on Puerto Angel and was captured. She believed that the Sphere were the "good guys" and the pirates the "bad guys." She managed to escape by tricking Mahad — who was on guard duty — and hid in the Mosquito bay. When Mahad captured her, she promised not to tell the Sphere about their location but he did not trust her. Alice threw Mahad out an open door but used her powers to save him. Out of pity, he hid her in his closet. However, Lena discovered her during a block-wide search and, through a telepathic communion, Alice learned from Lena that she was wrong about the Sphere. With the help of Cheng who fixed her Patroller, they planned to have Alice find their mother. Suddenly, they were intercepted by Diwan, whom Alice tricked into allowing them to escape. Now a supporter of the pirates, Alice plans to tell the other Guardians the truth, wherever she is reassigned.
- Astrid – Astrid is the daughter of Max. She seems to be very close to her father, as she always calls him 'Daddy.' She seems to be close in age to Mahad, towards whom she displayed requited interest. When she learned that her Dad was not the famous Sean of Aragon, she went to the Sphere but ended up hostage.
- Celia is a young Seijin girl who was taken in by the Pirates. When the crew was captured, Lena helped Celia discover her powers to defeat Jelola and Artemis. On Puerto Angel, Lena was her teacher in her quest to unlock the full potential of her powers. Celia could not talk while captive. She may have a crush on Cheng, calling him cute.
- Christophe Cortes – Full name "Christophe Mendias Theodore Cortes". Cortes' older brother. He refuses to call him Cortes and calls him by his first name: Aran. He arrives at Puerto Angel in a Mosquito asking a favour from Cortes to help him get his damaged ship that's stuck in ice barriers in a Sphere zone. Christophe's ship is the Callisto, a 'sister' to the Saint Nazaire. After Cortes helps Christophe free the Callisto from the icebarriers, Lena reveals him in possession of exalarium which is only useful to the Sphere in anti-Seijen containment technology. Christophe claims that he was only to going to deliver the supposedly worthless metal to maintain the Sphere's confidence. Unfortunately, when the Sphere left by Diwan assaulted both frigates and the Saint Nazaire being low on power, Christophe pretended to meet with Diwan to discuss their surrender before self-destructing the Callisto. Afterwards, he managed to escape Sphere custody with the promise to reunite with his brother soon.
- Darius is Oslo's twin brother. Was born minutes after his brother and his existence prevented Oslo from gaining his full Seijin potential. Was banished for life on the Vandegaard block.
- Hailong Zalo is an elder Seijin and ruler of Ningxia. He used to know Mila. He was imprisoned in a room where light felt like an intruder. Yet his apprentice Lee rescued him. Unfortunately, while being ambushed by Diwan, Zalo physically transmitted to Lena a message from her mother. Currently, he is weak but he left Lee in charge of Ningxia.
- Jonah is a scientist who was hired by the Sphere to design an Anti-Seijin holding cell on the Monolith for a very special Seijin. However, he heard that he would be executed after the job was done, compelling him to escape. He was intercepted by the pirates who asked for his help to sneak Mahad and Lena onto the Monolith. Instead, he took off in the Hyperion but was captured by Diwan. After a series of fights on the Monoliths, Jonah escaped with Mahad and Lena so the Sphere could never use his genius. Jonah was seen in the episode "Infiltration."
- Lee comes from Ningxia, and apprentice to an old friend of the Vector, Hailong Zalo. He came to Puerto Angel in search of "Little Phoenix" (Lena) for his master had a message from her mother. He was dismayed when the Sphere had turned against Ningxia with the aid of fellow apprentice, Feng. He helped Mahad and Lena escape from the guards and enlists their aid to save his master. He made it look like he was following Feng's orders to capture them. Once he distracted the guards, he freed Mahad, Lena and Zalo. But, they were ambushed by Diwan. Lee went a little offscreen for a while. After Ningxia was freed, Zalo put him in charge to protect Ningxia if the Sphere returns.
- Max is father to Astrid, and was a delivery man to a famous but now dead scientist, Sean of Aragon. He pretended to be that scientist in order to impress his daughter, but was, in reality, little more than a con man. Pretending to be the Sean of Aragon brought nothing but trouble, however, as the Sphere wanted to find the scientist, who had been working on a formula for an endless source of water when his lab 'mysteriously' blew up.
- Patrucci is an extremely paranoid citizen of Puerto Angel, Patrucci lives in constant fear of the Sphere, and of betrayal from his fellow rebels. He does not trust Mahad and Lena, nor seemingly Cortes, although he displayed concern for Dahlia in 'Manipulations'. His character model is often recycled, but most fans agree that the 'true' Patrucci only appeared in 'Manipulations'. Though he wanted to leave, he reappeared in "Alice" who ratted to Cortes that Mahad, Cheng and Lena were helping a Guardian escape.
- Shinseiki is a Guardian student who was banished to the Fringes for her attempts to fulfill the Prophecy on her own. Even in exile, Shinseiki brooded from revenge. Using dark powers, she kidnapped several Seijins in order to absorb their powers to unify the blocks of Skyland and recreate Earth, no matter how many suffered. To this end, she telepathically reached out to Lena to bring her to the Great Wall and then to her tower. However, Lena tricked Shinseiki, overloading her with power and destroying her tower, but the mad Seijin had survived the blast. Shinseiki moves like a circus performer and has a small brigade of Brigadiers as escorts
- Tibald Yee is Cheng's grandfather. He lived in the time before Earth broke up. When it did, he joined the Sphere when it brought order to the chaos. His daughter and her husband were Pirate scientists. Tibald made every last scrap of the Sphere's technology, from the Brigadiers to the S-22 Patrollers to the Monolith. While delaying development on his missile defense system, Tibald dispatched Patrollers all over Skyland to find Cheng. When he succeeded, Diwan found out and arrested him as well as Mahad and Lena who came to rescue Cheng. When the Pirates arrived, he fought with Cortes, passing him the plans to his missile defense system, and they settled on a trade for him, for Cheng. He is now a supporter of the Pirates secretly.

== Production ==
Emmanuel Gorinstein conceived the series in 2000, initially as an adult animation project.

The show was announced in September 2002 when French animation studio Method Films commissioned a hybrid animated series that combines CGI and traditional animation with stop-motion techniques. Method Films' partner Millimages would handling worldwide distribution for the hybrid series. By then, the series was repositioned to cater to a 9-14 demographic.

Two years later in May 2004, Canadian animation studio 9 Story Entertainment which was launched two years prior in September 2002 joined the upcoming hybrid animated series as a co-producer turning the series as a French/Canadian co-production as Method Films and the Canadian animation studio signed a deal with Nickelodeon's digital channel Nicktoons to broadcast the series in the US.

=== Animation ===
The first part of the animation was produced by Attitude Studios of Paris, France, with large amounts of facial animation work and rendering outsourced to DQ Entertainment in India. Subsequently, the later part of the season has been completely animated and finalized in DQ Entertainment of Hyderabad, India, using a completed motion capture shot in Attitude Studios. It appears to make extensive use of motion capture technology (i.e. animation modeled upon data from live actors) for a next-generation animation look.

=== Soundtrack ===
The music was composed by Paul Intson, of Canada. The extensive sound design and 5.1 surround mix was done by Jim Longo of Rhythm Division in Toronto, Canada. Music editing was performed at Rhythm Division by Rob Kirkpatrick on season 1 and Kevan Staples for season 2. Additional editing by Bojan Risojevic.

== Episodes ==
=== Series overview ===
Season	Episodes	Originally released	
Season	Episodes	First released	Last released
1	13	November 26, 2005	November 5, 2006
2	13	November 12, 2006	May 25, 2007

=== Season 1 (2005–06) ===
No. overall	No. in season	Title	Original release date
1–2	1–2	"Dawn of a New Day"	26 November 2005 (special); 22 April 2006; 23 April 2006
Welcome to Babylonia, home of Lena, Mahad and their mother Mila. A peaceful haven in the tyranny of the Sphere, the family lives happily, but with a secret. Seijins (humans with telekinetic powers) are the most wanted people in Skyland, something Mila knows only too well, as both she and her daughter belong to this select group. The children are unaware of their Mother's secret until an incident at their home exposes both Mila and Lena and they are forced to flee. Knowing the Sphere will hunt them down; Mila sends her children away and stays behind to be captured by the Sphere. Lena and Mahad are sent away in a stolen enemy ship when suddenly they find themselves confronted by the Pirates. The children are taken in by the band of pirates and learn even more of their parents past. They are escorted to their father's last known secret headquarters only to find his famous Hyperion ship—seemingly waiting for Mahad to inherit. Unfortunately, they are intercepted by the evil Diwan, minion to Sphere leader Oslo and they are forced to battle their way out. They rejoin the pirates who invite the children to live in Puerto Angel where they will continue the fight to find their mother and defeat the evil Sphere. And so, the adventure begins.
3	3	"The Great Wall"	30 April 2006
An old friend of the Vector's sends news to Puerto Angel — he may have a lead on Lena and Mahad's mother. They travel to Ningxia, a Chinese block, where they find a Sphere invasion in progress and are captured. In jail, they are introduced to the Vector's friend, Master Hailong Zalo, also a powerful Seijin. In a daring escape, Zalo psychically bonds with Lena to give her a telepathic message from her mother, in turn giving her enough power to defeat the invasion and escape with Mahad.
4	4	"Mogura"	7 May 2006
Puerto Angel suffers through a severe drought that ends up dangerously dehydrating Lena. The pirates investigate a remote block of ice that the Vector believes will supply them with much needed water. Upon arriving, they find that the Sphere has struck first, the pirates board the deserted drilling station in hopes of finding some water the Sphere may have left behind. There, they battle the Mogura, a huge spider-like robot that has turned from a simple tool into a deadly threat to any human that confronts it. Thankfully, the pirates (including a weak Lena) manage to fight the creature off, collect the vast water supply left behind and save the people of Puerto Angel.
5	5	"Raging Archipelago"	14 May 2006
The pirates of Puerto Angel rescue a mysterious stranger named Sansken who is looking to contact the pirates with important information about Kharzem Prison (where Mahad and Lena's mother Mila is being held). The kids follow him to the Raging Archipelago — formerly the city of Paris, hidden in a large atmospheric storm. It is there that they find themselves in a double-cross when it is revealed that Sansken lured them there to hand them over to the Sphere. After a huge battle with Diwan and Oslo, the children are rescued by Sansken who explains that he was blackmailed by the Sphere in order to save his own children.
6	6	"Eye of the Storm"	21 May 2006
An impending hurricane threatens a sector of Skyland and it's up to Cortes and the Saint Nazaire to rescue refugees left stranded. While investigating a deserted ice block, the storm overpowers the Hyperion leaving Mahad and Dahlia stranded. Back on Puerto Angel, Lena becomes concerned with Mahad's absence. Mahad and Dahlia realize that the heavy wind is pushing their ice block towards Puerto Angel. The only way to stop it is by detonating the reactor core of their ship and breaking up the deadly collision. Mahad tells Wayan of his plan and Lena, overhearing, fears for her brother's life. With all of her strength, she harnesses the power of the lightning to melt the ice block allowing Mahad and Dahlia to escape safely in the Hyperion.
7	7	"Mutiny"	28 May 2006
While out on patrol, the Saint Nazaire shoots down a wayward Sphere patroller and rescues a small family of Seijin escapees. Bringing them on-board, Cortes and the pirates realize too late that the "parents" are actually Sphere agents transporting a young girl, Celia, as their prisoner. The rebels find themselves imprisoned on their own ship and must act quickly to free themselves before Oslo and Diwan reach them. With the help of Lena, Celia's powers awaken and together they overcome the two agents in time.
8	8	"Manipulations"	2 July 2006
A solar phenomenon has unusual effects on Seijin powers which allows Oslo to take control of Dahlia in an effort learn the coordinates of the pirate hideout. He uses Dahlia to attack Puerto Angel's water storage tank, and pin the blame on Lena. Mahad is bewildered and more than a little angry at the change in Dahlia, who is really trying to fight her way free of Oslo's control. Lena is also feeling the effects of the solar phenomenon, and is uncertain of her own innocence. She turns to the Vector for help, and together they discover that Oslo is responsible. Lena uses her powers to get into Dahlia's head, and although she isn't strong enough to fight against Oslo, she convinces Dahlia that no one should be able to boss her around in her own body.
9	9	"King for a Day"	9 July 2006
Deciding that Mahad needs a lesson in responsibility, Cortes leaves him in charge of Puerto Angel while the Saint Nazaire goes to retrieve some unguarded water. Mahad makes the most of the opportunity and decides to declare a 'Mahad Day', complete with celebrations. But the fun is soon over when the threat of a fleet of Sphere ships reaches the pirate block. Mahad is certain something's fishy, and sure enough it turns out to be a hoax played by Cortes. Mahad calls him on it, and then refuses to listen when Cortes warns him that there really is a Sphere patroller on the way.
10	10	"Red Rock People"	16 July 2006
Mahad and Lena receive a distress call from their father and go off in search of him. Unknowingly, Oslo follows them, and they all end up stranded on a block that contains an indestructible monster.
11	11	"Babylonia"	23 July 2006
A telepathic message from their mother sends Lena and Mahad home to Babylonia looking for more information. The message turns out to be Lena's memories of her mother, but they prove to be powerful enough to save their lives.
12	12	"Blood Ties"	30 July 2006
Cheng is contacted by his grandfather, who he had been told was no longer alive. Desperate to know about his family he leaves Puerto Angel on a journey that proves to him family comes in many different packages.
13	13	"Life in Puerto Angel"	5 November 2006
During an expedition on the block of Brooklyn, Mahad, Lena and Cheng meet a strange character and his daughter, pursued by the Sphere. Once in Puerto Angel, the Vector identifies the man as being a great scientist whose research on water poses a threat to the Sphere. Mahad is more interested in his daughter, Astrid. She reveals a true surprise to him; Max is absolutely not the scientist who he claims to be.

=== Season 2 (2006–07) ===
No. overall	No. in season	Title	Original release date
14	1	"Shadows of the Past"	12 November 2006
Mahad and Lena stumble upon a water tanker on a very strange course. Inside, they find Oslo, near-death and with the tanker set on an unchangeable course for Oslo's home block, where his brother awaits.
15	2	"Heart of the Arena"	19 November 2006
Mahad is kidnapped and brought to Tak, a ringmaster who operates a popular fighting arena that provides entertainment for the Sphere and Skyland. It's up to Cortes, Lena and Dahlia to get Mahad back, but could they be walking into a trap?
16	3	"Wind Devils"	26 November 2006
Mahad runs into his old friend, Lucretia, but clashes with her ideals. Meanwhile, the Saint Nazaire is caught up in a wind storm with time becoming a very big factor.
17	4	"Cortes' Secret"	4 February 2007
Cortes is visibly irritated by the presence of his brother, Christophe, whom he considers a traitor. Things change when Christophe reveals that a rescue operation is needed to retrieve his ship, a sister ship to the St. Nazaire. But is Christophe really telling the whole story?
18	5	"Island of the Child King"	11 February 2007
Mahad and Lena travel to an old hotel in a faraway block, where a makeshift orphanage has been made. The leader of the block, an older child himself, refuses to believe Mahad and Lena's warnings that the Sphere is on their way, until things get serious.
19	6	"Alice"	18 February 2007
A sphere agent named Alice arrives in Puerto Angel and is imprisoned. Alice breaks out and is later kept hidden by Mahad after she saves his life, but is it possible she will never believe the truth about the Sphere that Mahad so desperately wants her to?
20	7	"Secret Power"	18 March 2007
Lena and other Seijins are abducted by a woman named Shinseiki, who claims she alone can fulfill the Prophecy and reunite Skyland. The trouble is, she needs to make use of other Seijins' powers to do so, and the process could end up destroying entire blocks and killing thousands.
21	8	"Book of Worlds"	25 March 2007
After finding a navigation device in a ghost ship, the pirates go off in search of the Book of Worlds, one of the few keys needed to unifying Skyland. However, the Sphere plans to gain an advantage from the book to rule all the known blocks. With the help of the ghostly Countess Kondratti, Mahada and Lena must find the book before the Sphere arrives if they will have any hope of finding Kharzem.
22	9	"Blue Sky"	1 April 2007
Thanks to the new defense grid, Blue Sky, installed by the Vector, Puerto Angel can remain hidden indefinitely, allowing the pirates to conduct their raids without fear of invasion. On one such raid, they discover a device that contains all of Mila's memories. However, in order to access those memories, the device must be connected to Blue Sky, rendering Puerto Angel defenseless. Lena, with the help of Cheng, go against Cortes' orders and connect the device, until they realize it is a trap set by Oslo, who plans to destroy the resistance once and for all.
23	10	"Infiltration"	8 April 2007
Taking a joyride in the Hyperion, Mahad and Lena nearly crash into Jonah, a security specialist fleeing the Sphere. Jonah explains he was hired to create a particular temporary holding cell on the Monolith for a "very important Seijin". Mahad and Lena are overjoyed—it has to be their mother and now they know exactly where to find her! Mahad comes up with a plan that gets him and Lena onto the Monolith. After some careful maneuvering, the children are blissfully reunited with their mother, but only briefly as Oslo and Diwan discover their whereabouts. Sadly, Mila realizes once again she must sacrifice herself for her children to escape. As Lena and Mahad speed away, Lena has a vision of the hangar where the Hyperion was found. Telling Mahad this is where they need to go next, the episode ends.
24	11	"The Secret of Temuera"	15 April 2007
Lena receives a vision of trouble in the Temuera block. Oslo's troops are occupying the area, looking for a legendary relic, "the Origin", which can magnify a Seijin's powers hundredfold. Mahad and Lena must cooperate with Faro, the village elder of the Temuera block, in order to retrieve the Origin before Oslo can get to it.
25	12	"Kharzem Fortress — Part One"	25 May 2007
Diwan seemingly dies whilst Lena and Mahad attempt to retrieve their mother but end up finding out that entering Kharzem was a trap. Oslo tells Lena that her father is alive and he knows where he is, she doesn't believe him. Is Oslo really telling the truth?
26	13	"Kharzem Fortress — Part Two"	25 May 2007
It is the final showdown between Lena and Oslo but is Lena strong enough to take down Oslo? Meanwhile, Mahad and Mila escape from Kharzem Fortress before it is severely damaged. Oslo manages to survive but is it too late for Lena to escape and will she survive? The Seijin Powers are finally introduced.

== Home releases ==
The full first season has been released on two DVD volumes by Madman Entertainment in Australia.

== Awards and nominations ==
Year	Association	Category	Nominee	Result	Ref.
2007	Gemini Awards	Best Animated Program or Series	Marilyn McAuley, Steve Jarosz, Vince Commisso	Won	
2007	Gemini Awards	Best Original Music Score for an Animated Program or Series	Paul Intson	Won	

== Novel adaptations ==
Between 2010 and 2011 three books inspired by the show have been published by Italian writer Davide Morosinotto under the pseudonym David Carlyle. They were originally solely published in Spain as a trilogy with the name "Skyland" followed by their novel names. Atlantyca sold the rights in Brazilian, Catalan, Spanish, Polish, Turkish, Macedonian, Russian, Hungarian and Chinese. Book three was never released in the Netherlands due to criticism on the two previous released book's grammatical mistakes and lack of interest. "Skyland: Islas en el cielo" was translated to "Skyland: islands in the wind", "Skyland: La Nave de las Tempestades" was translated to "Skyland: The Storm Ship" and "Skyland: La guerra dell'acqua" was translated to "Skyland: The Water War".
