= Soumsoum, the Night of the Stars =

2026 drama film by Mahamat-Saleh Haroun

- French theatrical release poster
- French: Soumsoum, la nuit des astres
- Directed by: Mahamat-Saleh Haroun
- Written by: Mahamat-Saleh Haroun; Laurent Gaudé
- Produced by: Florence Stern
- Starring: Maïmouna Miawama; Ériq Ebouaney; Achouackh Abakar Souleymane
- Cinematography: Mathieu Giombini
- Edited by: Svetlana Vaynblat
- Music by: Bibi Tanga
- Production companies: Pili Films; Goï-Goï Productions
- Distributed by: KMBO (France)
- Release dates: 19 February 2026 (Berlinale); 22 April 2026 (France)
- Running time: 101 minutes
- Countries: France; Chad
- Languages: French; Chadian Arabic

Soumsoum, the Night of the Stars (French: Soumsoum, la nuit des astres, Arabic: سومسوم ليلة النجوم, romanized: Sumisum Laylah al-Nujūm) is a 2026 drama film directed by Mahamat-Saleh Haroun, co-written with Laurent Gaudé. A co-production of Chad and France, set in the Ennedi mountains, it follows Kellou (Maïmouna Miawama), a teenager girl haunted by visions she does not understand.

The film had its world premiere at the main competition of the 76th Berlin International Film Festival on 19 February 2026, where it won the FIPRESCI Prize for Best Film. It was theatrically released in France by KMBO on 22 April.

It was also selected as the Chadian entry for the Best International Feature Film at the 99th Academy Awards.

== Premise ==
A young woman troubled by visions befriends a village outcast, and together they face hostility from their community while fighting for freedom and belonging.

== Cast ==
- Maïmouna Miawama as Kellou
- Ériq Ebouaney as Garba
- Achouackh Abakar Souleymane as Aya

== Production ==
The film was written by Mahamat-Saleh Haroun in collaboration with Laurent Gaudé. It is produced by Florence Stern for Pili Films in co-production with Haroun's Chad-based banner Goï-Goï Productions.

The project received support from the Centre national du cinéma et de l'image animée (CNC) through its advance on revenues scheme and backing from the Red Sea Fund. It was pre-purchased by Ciné+ OCS and TV5 Monde.

Cinematography is by Mathieu Giombini, with an original score composed by Central African musician Bibi Tanga. World sales are handled by Films Boutique and French distribution is handled by KMBO.

== Release ==
The film had its world premiere at the main competition of the 76th Berlin International Film Festival on 19 February 2026, where it was nominated for the Golden Bear. The film will have its North American Premiere in Centrepiece at the 2026 Toronto International Film Festival on 17 September 2026.

It was also selected as the Chadian entry for the Best International Feature Film at the 99th Academy Awards. This marked Haroun’s fourth film submitted for the country in the category.

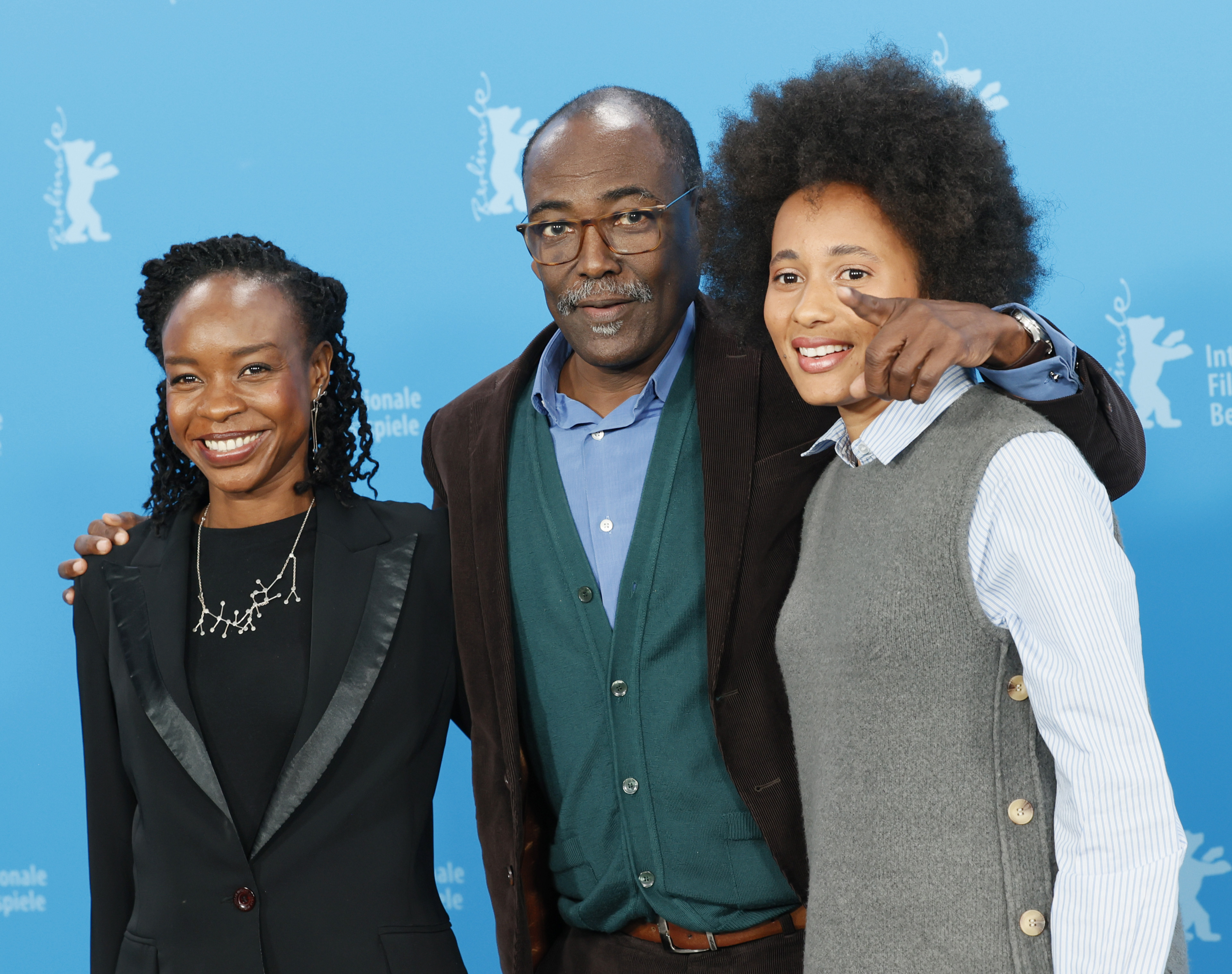
Achouackh Abakar Souleymane, Mahamat-Saleh Haroun and Maïmouna Miawama at the 76th Berlin International Film Festival

== Accolades ==
Award	Date of ceremony	Category	Nominee(s)	Result	Ref.
Berlin International Film Festival	February 22, 2026	Golden Bear	Soumsoum, the Night of the Stars	Nominated	

== See also ==
- List of submissions to the 99th Academy Awards for Best International Feature Film
- List of Chadian submissions for the Academy Award for Best International Feature Film
