= A Season in France =

2017 film

- Film poster
- Directed by: Mahamat Saleh Haroun
- Starring: Sandrine Bonnaire
- Release dates: 8 September 2017 (TIFF); 7 February 2018 (France)
- Running time: 100 minutes
- Country: France
- Language: French

A Season in France (French: Une Saison en France) is a 2017 French drama film directed by Mahamat Saleh Haroun. It was screened in the Special Presentations section at the 2017 Toronto International Film Festival. The film opened the Afrika Filmfestival in Louvain, Belgium in April 2018 and is distributed in the Benelux by Imagine.

== Cast ==
- Sandrine Bonnaire as Carole Blaszak
- Eriq Ebouaney as Abbas Mahadjir

== Plot ==
The film is set in 2016. Abbas Mahadjir was a French teacher in the Central African Republic. He fled with his family, including his brother, from one of the civil wars that struck his country. He is haunted by the memory of his wife, killed during their flight. He now lives in France [the film is set in the Paris suburbs] with his two young children, Asma and Yacine, who go to school. He works in a fruit and flower market, and skips between borrowed and rented apartments. He meets Carole at the market, a florist of Polish origin with whom he establishes a relationship.

When his asylum application is rejected by OFPRA (Office français de protection des réfugiés et apatrides), Abbas initiates an appeal. When this in turn is rejected, he is served with an 'obligation to leave' notice, within 30 days. Now without work and housing, and "sans papiers", Abbas and his children find refuge with Carole. His brother, who had been a philosophy lecturer in the CAR, also has his asylum application rejected, and he self-immolates in the immigration office, later dying from his injuries.

At the end of the statutory 30 days, suffering extreme distress, Abbas does not file an appeal with his last hope, the chairman of the administrative tribunal. When the police summon Carole to the police station and inform her of the penalties incurred for helping foreign over-stayers, he prefers to flee with his children without leaving an address or contact. Carole tries in vain to find any trace of them in the Calais Jungle migrant camp, which had been cleared and dismantled a few hours earlier.

== Reception ==
On review aggregator website Rotten Tomatoes, the film holds an approval rating of 92% based on 12 reviews, with an average rating of 6.8/10.
