= Lingui, The Sacred Bonds =

2021 film

- International release poster
- Directed by: Mahamat Saleh Haroun
- Written by: Mahamat Saleh Haroun
- Produced by: Florence Stern
- Starring: Achouackh Abakar Souleymane; Rihane Khalil Alio
- Cinematography: Mathieu Giombini
- Edited by: Marie-Hélène Dozo
- Music by: Wasis Diop
- Production companies: Pili Films; Goï Goï Productions; Made In Germany Filmproduktion; Beluga Tree; Canal+ International; Proximus
- Release date: 8 July 2021 (Cannes)
- Running time: 87 minutes
- Countries: France; Chad; Germany; Belgium
- Languages: French; Chadian Arabic
- Box office: $37,393

Lingui, The Sacred Bonds (French: Lingui, les liens sacrés) is a 2021 internationally co-produced drama film written and directed by Mahamat Saleh Haroun. In June 2021, the film was selected to compete for the Palme d'Or at the 2021 Cannes Film Festival. It was selected as the Chadian entry for the Best International Feature Film at the 94th Academy Awards. It also won IFFI ICFT UNESCO Gandhi Medal at the 52nd International Film Festival of India

== Plot ==
On the outskirts of N'Djamena in Chad, Amina lives alone with her 15-year-old daughter Maria. Her already fragile world collapses the day she discovers that her daughter is pregnant. The teenager does not want this pregnancy. In a country where abortion is not only condemned by religion, but also by law, Amina finds herself facing a battle that seems lost in advance.

== Cast ==
- Achouackh Abakar Souleymane as Amina
- Rihane Khalil Alio as Maria
- Youssouf Djaoro as Brahim

== Release ==
Following its premiere at the Cannes Film Festival, the film's distribution rights for the US, UK, Turkey, Latin America and Ireland were acquired by MUBI.

== See also ==
- List of submissions to the 94th Academy Awards for Best International Feature Film
- List of Chadian submissions for the Academy Award for Best International Feature Film
