= Kalala (film) =

2006 Chadian documentary film

- Directed by: Mahamat-Saleh Haroun
- Written by: Mahamat-Saleh Haroun
- Based on: Hissein Djibrine
- Produced by: Mahamat-Saleh Haroun
- Release date: 2006
- Running time: 50 minutes
- Country: South Africa
- Language: French

Kalala is a 2006 Chadian documentary film directed and produced by Mahamat-Saleh Haroun. The film is a tribute to a friend of Haroun, Kalala alias Hissein Djibrine, who died of Aids in 2003.

The film made its premier on 20 August 2021. The film received mixed reviews from critics and screened in many film festivals.
