= Abouna (film) =

2002 film by Mahamat Saleh Haroun

Abouna (Our Father)
- DVD cover
- Directed by: Mahamat Saleh Haroun
- Written by: Mahamat Saleh Haroun
- Produced by: Guillaume de Seille; Abderrahmane Sissako
- Starring: Ahidjo Mahamet Moussa; Hamza Moctar Aguid; Zara Haroun; Mounira Khalil; Diego Moustapha Ngarade
- Cinematography: Abraham Haile Biru
- Edited by: Sarah Taouss Matton
- Music by: Ali Farka Touré
- Distributed by: Filmmuseum Distributie (Netherlands); Kairos Filmverleih (Germany); Leisure Time Features (USA); MK2 Diffusion (France)
- Release date: 20 May 2002 (Cannes)
- Running time: 84 minutes
- Countries: France; Chad; Netherlands
- Languages: Chadian Arabic; French

Abouna (Arabic: أبونا, romanized: ‘Abūna, English: "Our Father") is a 2002 film by Chadian director Mahamat Saleh Haroun and is the story of two young brothers' search for their father. It was filmed on location in Gaoui and N'Djamena, Chad. It was the Chadian submission for the Academy Award for Best Foreign Language Film at the 75th Academy Awards but was not nominated.

== Plot ==
Two boys (Tahir and Amine) awake one morning to find that their father has abandoned their family. Shocked, they begin to misbehave. While surreptitiously watching a movie, they think they see their father speaking to them and steal the film to examine the frames. Their mother (Achta) eventually despairs and sends them to Koranic school. Unhappy, they plan their escape until the eldest boy falls in love with a deaf girl (Khalil)

== Casting and production ==
Ahidjo Mahamat Moussa, who played the 15-year-old Tahir, was offered a choice of boys to play his younger brother Amine. He eventually chose eight-year-old Hamza Moctar Aguid because he felt that Aguid could really be his brother.

After each day for shooting, film was sent 2600 miles to Paris for processing. Only after waiting several days, when word came back that there were no problems, would shooting resume.

== Cast ==
- Ahidjo Mahamat Moussa as Tahir
- Hamza Moctar Aguid as Amine
- Zara Haroun as Achta (the mother)
- Mounira Khalil as Mute girl
- Diego Moustapha Ngarade as Uncle Adoum

== Awards ==
The film won the following awards:

- 2002 Hong Kong International Film Festival: Firebird Award – Special Mention
- 2002 Kerala International Film Festival: FIPRESCI Prize and Golden Crow Pheasant
- 2003 Ouagadougou Panafrican Film and Television Festival: Baobab Seed Award, Best Cinematography, INALCO Award and UNICEF Award for Childhood

== See also ==
- List of Chadian submissions for the Academy Award for Best Foreign Language Film
