= Edouard Sailly =

Chadian film director

- Born: April 20, 1941; Abéché Chad
- Died: September 8, 2010 (aged 69); N'Djamena Chad
- Occupations: Film director Screenwriter
- Years active: 1964-2010
- Notable work: Pêcheurs du Chari [The Fishermen of Chari], 1964; Le Lac Chad [Lake Chad], 1966; Les abattoirs de Forchia [The Slaughterhouses of Forchia], 1966; Salam el Kebir, 1966; Largeau, 1966; Le Troisième Jour [The Third Day, 1967; L'enfant du Tchad [Child of Chad], 1972; A la decouverte du Tchad, 1972

Edouard Sailly was a pioneering Chadian film director, "the first filmmaker in Chad".

== Life ==
Sailly trained in France with Actualités Françaises. In the 1960s and early 1970s he made a series of short, mostly ethnographic, documentary films.

== Filmography ==
- Pêcheurs du Chari [The Fishermen of Chari], 1964
- Le Lac Chad [Lake Chad], 1966
- Les abattoirs de Forchia [The Slaughterhouses of Forchia], 1966
- Salam el Kebir, 1966
- Largeau, 1966
- Le Troisième Jour [The Third Day, 1967
- L'enfant du Tchad [Child of Chad], 1972
- A la decouverte du Tchad, 1972
