= Maxime Musqua =

French comedian and actor (born 1987)

Maxime Musqua (born 27 July 1987) is a French comedian and actor. He was a columnist at the Petit Journal for one season between September 2013 and June 2014.

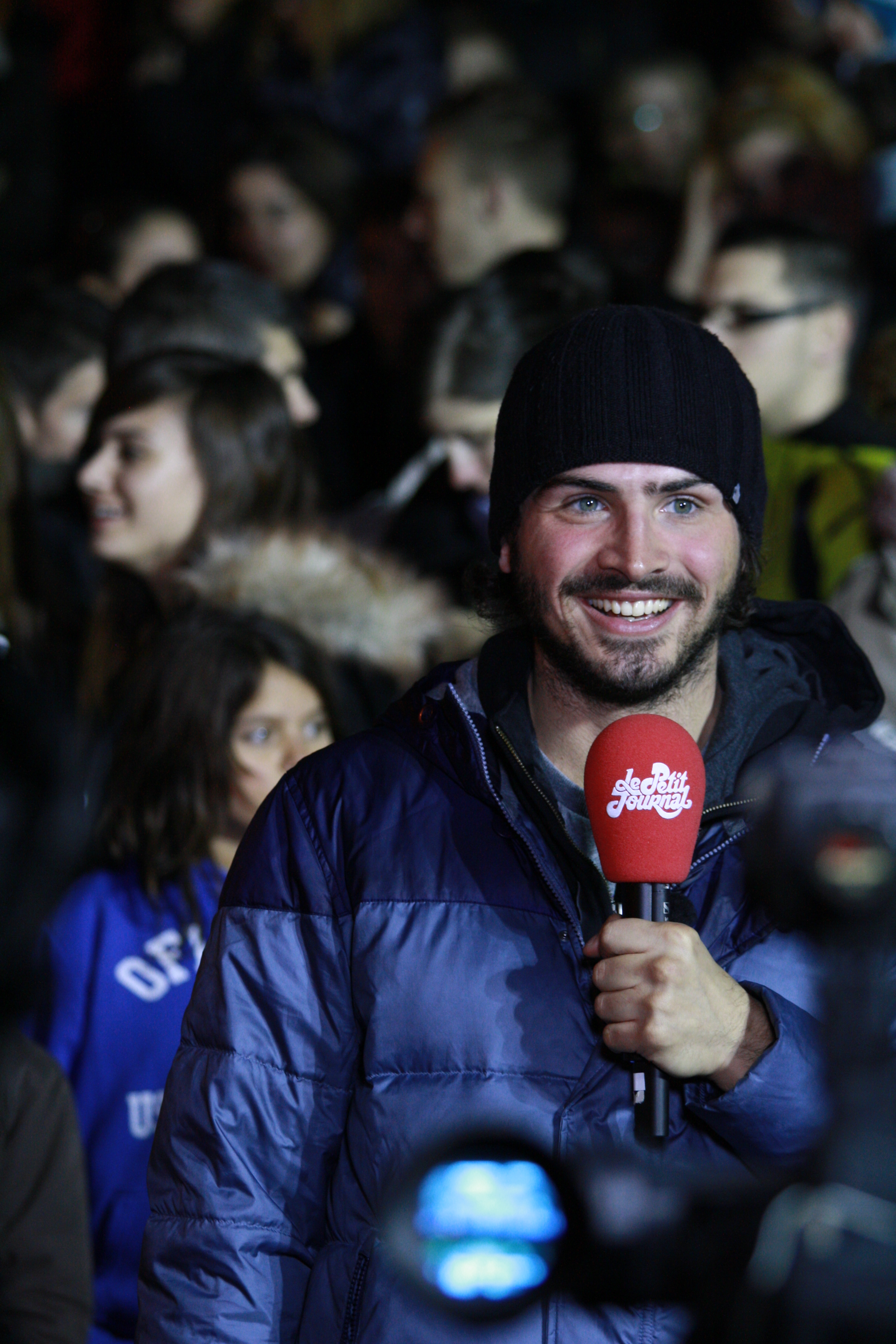
Maxime Musqua in November 2013
