= Zara Mahamat Yacoub =

Chadian filmmaker, director and journalist

- Education: University of Chad
- Occupations: Filmmaker, director, Journalist

Zara Mahamat Yacoub is a Chadian filmmaker, director and journalist.

== Biography ==
=== Early life and education ===
Growing up, Yacoub stated she wanted to be a lawyer. Yacoub studied humanities at the University of Chad. Later, she studied communications, specializing in audiovisual media at Institut national de l'audiovisuel in Bry-sur-Marne, France.

=== Career ===
Back in Chad, Yacoub worked as a presenter and journalist for the radio. After the founding of the first Chadian television station, Télé Tchad, she switched to this and first worked as program head. She was the only woman in the entire station. Later Yacoub rose to head manager of the National Television of Chad. She also worked as a journalist for the South African station Channel Africa.

For several years, Yacoub worked for the Association of Private Radio Stations of Chad (Union des Radios Privées du Tchad, URPT). Moreover, she was head of the private radio station Dja FM. She was the first woman to have launched an independent radio station in Chad. She declared that community radio stations play a vital role in the development of Chad, but do not receive substantial support from the Chadian state.

In addition to her career in Chadian Television, Yacoub has also produced several, mostly documentary, short films with her own production company, Sud Cap Production, which she founded in 2001. Both in her films and off the screen, Yacoub is committed to greater human rights, especially to the equality of women in Chad, which has made her a target for repression. Her short film "Dilemme au féminin" which criticized female genital mutilation was especially controversial. The film led to strong protests in the country and a fatwa was pronounced against her due to nudity and other objectionable material.

=== Arrest ===
In 2015, she was arrested after a brawl broke out between her family and some traders who wanted to buy her house. Yacoub was released after neighborhood involvement. She conducted a training session on election coverage in 2016, focusing mainly on reporting skills, ethics and professional conduct.

== Filmography ==
- 1994: Dilemme au féminin
- 1995: Les Enfants de la rue
- 1996: La Jeunesse et l'emploi
- 1996: Les Enfants de la guerre
- 1999: Enfance confisquée
- 2002: Marad Al Ma Inda Daw
