= Issa Serge Coelo =

Chadian film director (born 1967)

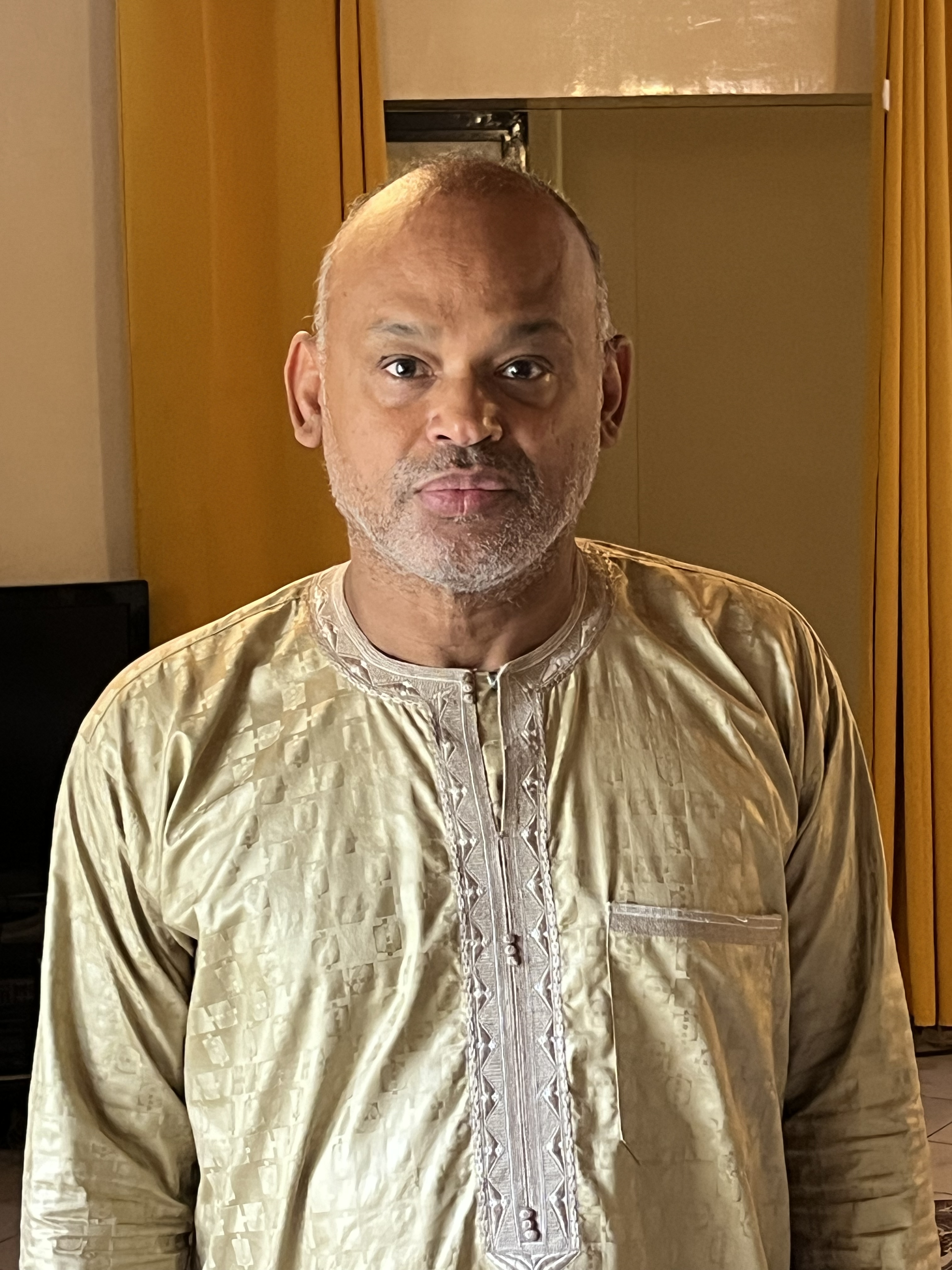
- Born: 1967 (age 58–59); Biltine, Chad
- Education: École supérieure de réalisation audiovisuelle
- Occupation: Film director
- Notable work: Tartina City

Issa Serge Coelo (born 1967) is a Chadian film director. Born in Biltine, Chad, he studied history in Paris and film at the École supérieure de réalisation audiovisuelle (ÉSRA). He then worked as a cameraman at Métropole Télévision, France 3, TV5MONDE and CFI before creating the 1994 short film Un taxi pour Aouzou. The film was well-received, being nominated for a 1997 César Award in the category Best Short Film - Fiction. This was followed by the feature films Daresalam (2000) and Tartina City (2006). He also portrayed himself in the 1999 film Bye Bye Africa, which was directed by Chad's other prominent director Mahamat Saleh Haroun.
