= Le Pèlerin de Camp Nou =

- Directed by: Abakar Chene Massar
- Written by: Abakar Chene Massar
- Produced by: Bentley Brown
- Starring: Abakar Chene Massar; Ousman "Johnny" Adoum; Nadech Ngaryo; Adoudou Ahmat Aziber; Hamza Malloum Ali
- Cinematography: Bentley Brown
- Edited by: Bentley Brown
- Music by: Aaron Brown; Sosal Abakar
- Release date: 4 April 2009
- Running time: 94 minutes
- Countries: Chad; United States
- Languages: Chadian Arabic, French

Le Pèlerin de Camp Nou (English: "Captain Majid") is a 2009 feature film produced in the north-central African country of Chad. A work of "no-budget" digital cinema, it experienced international release at the Festival du Film PanAfricain in Cannes, France, in April 2009, and was featured at festivals in Montreal, Toronto, and London in 2009 before screening at the International Film Festival Rotterdam in 2010.

== Synopsis ==
Majid (Abakar Chene Massar) duels his own coach (Ousman Adoum) for the heart of team president's daughter Faiza (Nadech Ngaryo). Faiza, an avid football fan herself, makes her intentions clear: she will be devoted to one and one only.

Majid is almost sidelined in the town championship game but manages to lead his team to victory. His dream of playing international football is matched in intensity only by a budding relationship with Faiza and the upcoming academic exams that will determine his future. All is at stake, however, when local drugs threaten to throw Majid into a downward spiral.
