= GriGris =

- Film poster
- Directed by: Mahamat Saleh Haroun
- Written by: Mahamat-Saleh Haroun
- Produced by: Florence Stern
- Starring: Soulémane Démé; Mariam Monory; Cyril Guei; Marius Yelolo
- Cinematography: Antoine Héberlé
- Edited by: Marie-Hélène Dozo
- Music by: Wasis Diop
- Production company: Pili Films
- Distributed by: Les Films du Losange
- Release date: 22 May 2013 (Cannes)
- Running time: 100 minutes
- Countries: France; Chad
- Languages: French; Arabic

GriGris is a 2013 French-Chadian drama film directed by Mahamat Saleh Haroun, starring Soulémane Démé, Mariam Monory, Cyril Guei and Marius Yelolo. It is about a 25-year-old man with a paralysed leg who dreams of becoming a dancer, and starts to work for a gang of petrol smugglers. The film was produced through the French Pili Films with co-production support from the Chadian Goï Goï Productions. It also received support from Canal+, Ciné+, TV5Monde, Canal Horizons and the CNC. Filming started 29 October 2012.

The film was nominated for the Palme d'Or at the 2013 Cannes Film Festival and won the Vulcan Award. The film was selected as the Chadian entry for the Best Foreign Language Film at the 86th Academy Awards, but it was not nominated. The film also screened at the 36th Denver Film Festival.

== See also ==
- List of submissions to the 86th Academy Awards for Best Foreign Language Film
- List of Chadian submissions for the Academy Award for Best Foreign Language Film
