= DP75: Tartina City =

- Screenshot
- Directed by: Issa Serge Coelo
- Written by: Issa Serge Coelo; André Dionlar
- Produced by: Issa Serge Coelo
- Starring: Youssouf Djaoro; Billy Joséphine; Felkissam Mahamat
- Cinematography: Pierre Stoeber
- Edited by: Samuel Guelbaye; Catherine Schwartz
- Music by: Abdellah Chafik; Hicham Ayouch
- Release date: February 28, 2007 (FESPACO Film Festival)
- Running time: 88 minutes
- Country: Chad
- Languages: Arabic, French, German

DP75: Tartina City is a 2007 dramatic film by Chadian director Issa Serge Coelo, now at his second feature film. The film has won the Innovation Award at the 31st Montreal World Film Festival. While the country where the action is set remains unnamed, the context is that of Chadian history in the 1980s and 1990s. The name's title is taken from the "tartina", a mixture of bread and sheep's bowels served to the prisoners.

== Synopsis ==
The action is set in an unnamed African country, where a brutal governative death squad commanded by Colonel Koulbou (Felkissam Mahamat) is active. A journalist, Adoum (Youssouf Djaoro), having obtained his passport wants to travel abroad so to be able to report on the situation in his country; but while at the airport, a compromising letter is found on him. Adoum is thrown in one of Koulbou's jails. All hope seems lost, but Adoum finds unexpected help from Koulbou's estranged wife, Hawa.

== Reception ==
The film was reviewed favourably by Variety, which while noting the "rocky story progression and a minimalist tech package" of the feature, judged it overcame these difficulties by placing in the center the figure of Colonel Koulbou, whose interpretation is commended. The reviewer concludes saying that "Coelo displays a commitment to social concerns that flags him as a filmmaker to watch from the region." Jeune Afrique also reviews positively the film, "a very harsh film, without any concessions to aestheticisms ... Its very crude images have at times shocked the spectators, but the authour avoids falling in sensationalism to describe the martyrdom of a freedom of opinion prisoner".
