= Daresalam =

- Directed by: Issa Serge Coelo
- Written by: Issa Serge Coelo; Ismael Ben-Cherrif; Pierre Guillaume
- Produced by: Pierre Javeaux; Issa Serge Coelo; Pierre Chevalier
- Starring: Abdoulaye Ahmat; Haikal Zakaria
- Cinematography: Jean-Jacques Mrejen
- Edited by: Catherine Schwartz
- Music by: Khalil Chahine
- Release date: 2000
- Running time: 105 min.
- Country: Chad
- Languages: Chadian Arabic, French

Daresalam (English: "Let There Be Peace") is a 2000 dramatic film by Chadian director Issa Serge Coelo. It has been considered one of the very few recent African films that has treated the theme of the internecine conflicts that have ravaged the African continent since independence. While set in a fictional African country called Daresalam, it reflects the civil war that ravaged Chad during the 1960s and 1970s.

== Synopsis ==
The film takes place in a fictional central African country (called Daresalam, "the Land of Peace" in Arabic) amidst a civil war. It features as main characters two young friends, Koni (Haikal Zakaria) and Djimi (Abdoulaye Ahmat), whose peaceful existence is interrupted when the central government arrives in their village, harassing them and browbeating the villagers into paying new taxes to help fight the civil war.

A heated discussion ensues, which degenerates, causing the death of a government official, which causes in retaliation the burning of the village and the massacre of its inhabitants. Koni, Djimi, and others join the rebellion, but the rebels eventually split, with Djimi remaining with the hardliners and Koni going instead with a faction that supports compromise with the government. The two friends become estranged. Koni will later be executed in a coup, while Djimi will leave the rebels and return to his home village with a war widow and a sewing machine left to him by a fallen combatant, with which he can attempt to start a new life for himself and his family.

Director Issa Coelo, in speaking of his film, explains he wanted to expose the vicious circle that originates when a despotic government causes the outbreak of a civil war, which ends to feed itself endlessly, as each power maintains itself through despotism, thus generating its own armed opposition. In Coelo's words, "war becomes the only economy of the country. Violence, the only way of speech and communication possible. ... With in mind the myth of Cain and Abel, Daresalam narrates how this war machine finishes to pit one against the other two friends, at the beginning moved by the same ideals. This story is meant to be a speech against war and for humanity's survival."

== Reception and evaluation ==
The LA Weekly judged the film positively, calling it "achingly beautiful and sad", and appreciates the final, which "ends on a note of un-ironic optimism that is more radical than all the calculated nihilism currently being served up on Western movie screens", and compared the film to Barbet Schroeder's Our Lady of the Assassins in their common ambition "to shed light on shadowy existences".

The film is analyzed by Roy Armes, that observes how Coelo avoids any heroics, showing the rebels' limitations and the confusion of the conflict. While judging the work "a sincere and serious study of a key aspect of contemporary Africa", he feels that the film lacks the passion of Med Hondo's works on the Polisario rebels, possibly because of Coelo's belief that "cinema should ask questions rather than give answers", which could explain the distance we are maintained from the two main characters. The film is also mentioned by Françoise Pfaff as an example of a new series of African historical films, which avoid the oversimplification of the past, and in particular Daresalam in its problematic description of post-independence Africa is seen as close to Flora Gomes' Mortu Nega.
