= Mahamat-Saleh Haroun =

Chadian film director

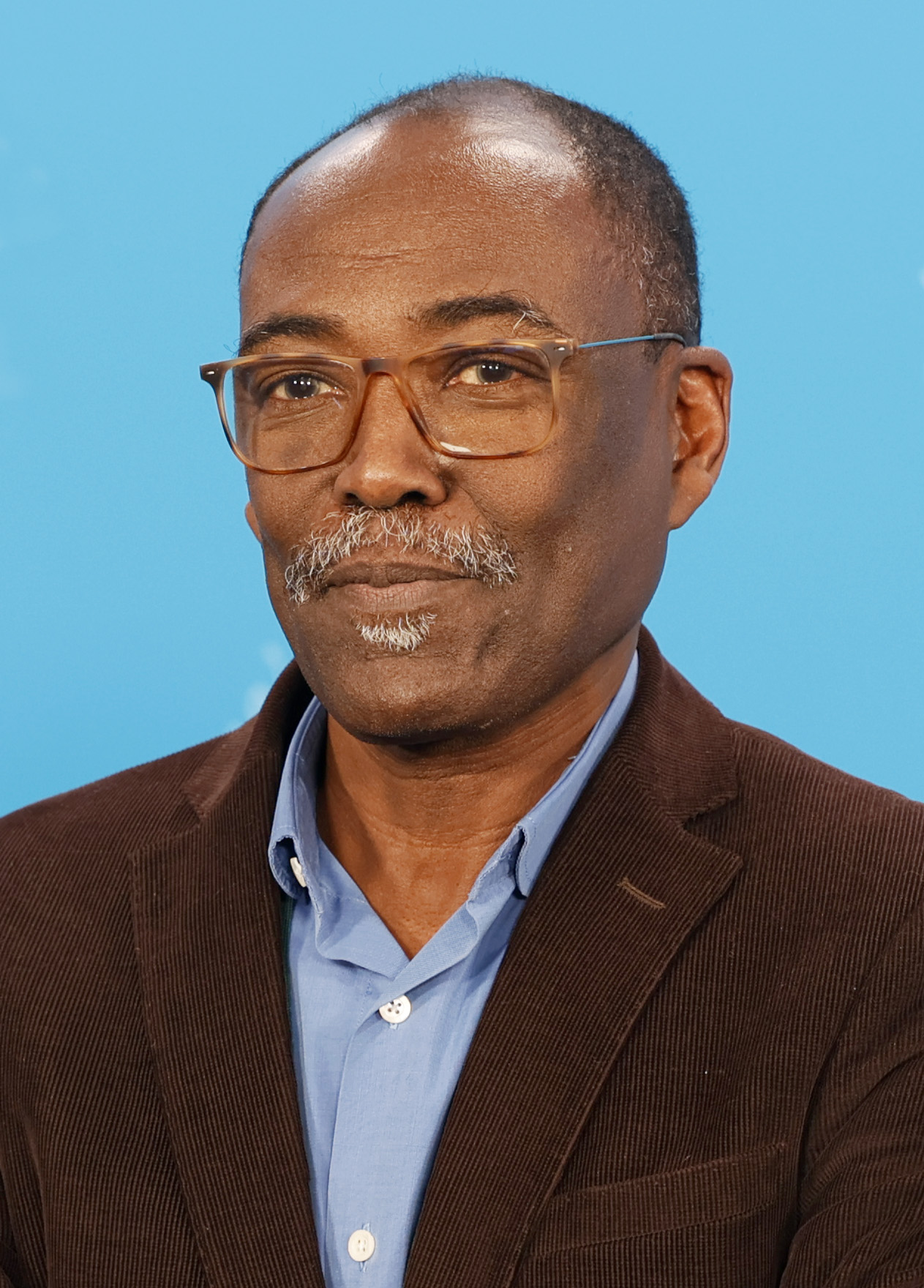
- Haroun in 2026
- Born: Abéché, Chad
- Occupation: Film director
- Awards: FIPRESCI Prize at the 76th Berlin International Film Festival for Soumsoum, The Night of the Stars (2026)

Mahamat-Saleh Haroun (French pronunciation: [ma.ama sale aʁun]; Arabic: محمد الصالح هارون) is a Chadian film director based in France. He is regarded as the first Chadian filmmaker to direct a feature-length film, and he typically serves as both writer and director on his projects. Most of his films are set in and filmed in Chad.

== Early life and education ==
Mahamat-Saleh Haroun was born in Abéché, Chad.

He left the country during the Chad civil war, and has lived in France since 1982.

Haroun studied film at the Conservatoire libre du cinéma français in Paris. He later went to study journalism at Bordeaux I.U.T. (Technical Institute), and then worked for several years as a journalist in France.

== Filmmaking career ==
Haroun directed his first short film, Tan Koul in 1991, and became widely known after his second film, Maral Tanié (25 minutes), directed in 1994. This film tells the story of seventeen-year-old Halimé, whose family forces her to marry a man in his fifties. Halimé refuses to consummate the marriage.

In 1999, Haroun released his first feature film Bye Bye Africa, which he wrote, directed, and starred in. The film, a docudrama, tells the story of a film director from Chad who returns to his home country. It received a jury mention at the Venice Film Festival. Bye Bye Africa is the first feature film from Chad.

In 2001, he directed a short film Letter from New York City, which won the Prize for the best video at the 11th African Film Festival in Milan, Italy.

In 2002, he wrote and directed his second feature film, Abouna, which won the Best Cinematography award at FESPACO in 2003. Set in the capital of Chad, N'Djamena, Abouna is the story of two young brothers who wake up one morning and realise that their father has left the family, and decide to search for their father in the city.

Haroun then shot a documentary, Kalala, the intimate portrait of Hissein Djibrine (nicknamed Kalala), a close friend of Haroun who died in 2003 of AIDS. Hissein Djibrine produced the filmmaker's first two feature films, and Haroun was deeply touched by his death and wanted to honor his memory.

In 2006, Haroun directed Dry Season (Daratt), the story of young Akim, who at the age of 16, left his village in Chad for the capital, N'Djamena, to avenge his father. He quickly finds the murderer, a former war criminal, and gets hired as an apprentice in his bakery. Daratt won the Bronze Stallion of Yennenga, as well as the best cinematography award at FESPACO in 2007.

In 2008, he directed Sex, Okra and Salted Butter> (Sexe, gombo et beurre salé). This comedy follows the lives of a family of Chadian immigrants in Bordeaux, France. Hortense cheats on her much older husband, her husband also strays, and their son goes to great lengths to conceal his sexuality from his parents. Meanwhile, the two younger sons are looking for guidance outside the family.

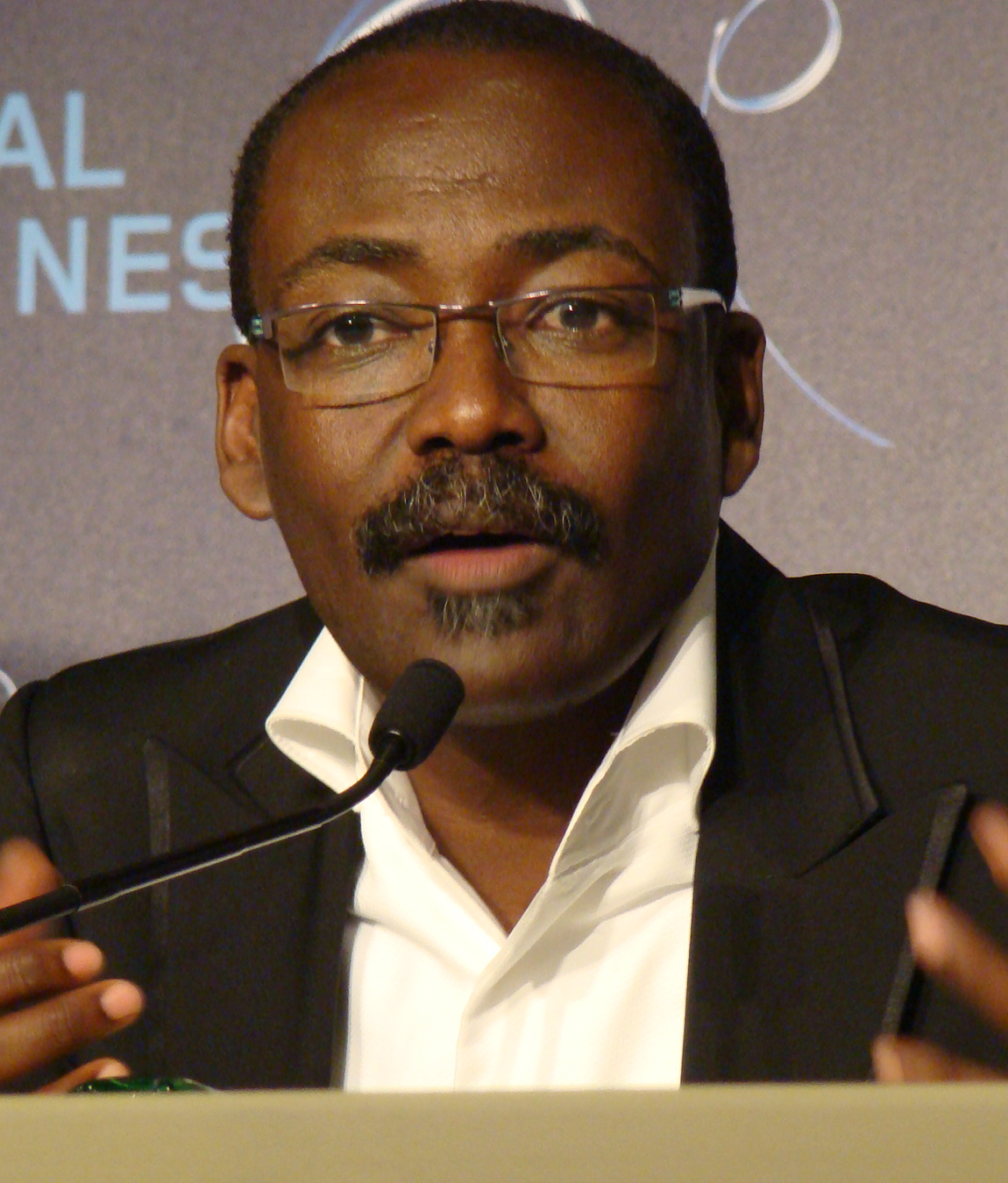
Haroun at the 2010 Cannes Film Festival

In 2010, he directed his fourth feature film A Screaming Man (Un homme qui crie), which won the Jury Prize at the 2010 Cannes Film Festival. This film tells the story of Adam and his son Abdel who are separated by the civil war in Chad. The father's job is in jeopardy because the new management of the hotel wants to give his job to his son. The presence of rebels in N’Djamena pushes Adam to lose any way to contact his son. Haroun received the Robert Bresson Prize for this film at the Venice Film Festival.

In 2013, his film GriGris was nominated for the Palme d'Or at the Cannes Film Festival. Set in Chad, the film tells the story of Grisgris, a young man who is disabled, dreams of becoming a dancer and gets involved in smuggling.

In 2016, Haroun was again at Cannes to present his documentary Hissein Habré, a Chadian Tragedy, about the Chadian dictator from 1982 to 1990, Hissein Habré. The film consists of interviews (mostly conducted by Clément Abaifouta of the Association of the Victims of the Hissein Habré Regime) of victims of Habré about their arrests and tortures by the secret police.

In 2017 Haroun made his second feature film set in France, A Season in France.

In Haroun's 2020 film Lingui, The Sacred Bonds, he returns to Chad, focusing on the problems faced by thirty-year-old Amina and her daughter Maria, who is half her age. When Amina, a practicing Muslim, realises that her daughter is pregnant and that she wants to have an abortion, the mother and daughter are confronted by the fact that abortion is both illegal and considered "immoral" in Chad.

In 2026, Haroun directed Soumsoum, the Night of the Stars, which follows Kellou, a teenage girl haunted by visions she does not understand, set in the Ennedi Mountains of northeastern Chad. The film had its world premiere in the main competition of the 76th Berlin International Film Festival on 19 February 2026, where it won the FIPRESCI Prize for Best Film.

== Recognition and other activities ==
In 2011, Haroun was a member of the jury for the main competition chaired by Robert De Niro at the 2011 Cannes Film Festival. In 2012, he was selected as a president of the 28th International Love Film Festival at Mons.

Haroun's first novel, Djibril ou les Ombres portées, was published in 2017 by Gallimard.

From 5 February 2017 to 8 February 2018, Haroun was Minister of Tourism, Culture and Crafts of Chad.

In December 2023, alongside 50 other filmmakers, Haroun signed an open letter published in Libération demanding a ceasefire and an end to the killing of civilians amid the 2023 Israeli invasion of the Gaza Strip, and for a humanitarian corridor into Gaza to be established for humanitarian aid, and the release of hostages.

== Awards ==
- 1999: Best first film award at the Venice Film Festival for Bye Bye Africa
- 2006: Special Jury Prize at the Venice Film Festival for Daratt
- 2007: Bronze Stallion of Yennenga and Best Photo Award at FESPACO 2007 for Daratt
- 2010: Jury Prize at the Cannes Film Festival 2010 for A Screaming Man
- 2010: Robert-Bresson Prize at the Venice Film Festival (awarded by the Catholic Church) for A Screaming Man.

== Filmography ==
Year	English Title	Original Title	Notes
1999	Bye Bye Africa		Debut feature
2002	Abouna	أبونا	
2006	Dry Season	دارات	Grand Special Jury Prize at the 63rd Venice International Film Festival
2008	Sex, Okra and Salted Butter	Sexe, gombo et beurre salé	TV Movie
2010	A Screaming Man	Un homme qui crie	Jury Prize at the 2010 Cannes Film Festival
2013	GriGris		
2017	A Season in France	Une Saison en France	
2021	Lingui, The Sacred Bonds	Lingui, les liens sacrés	
2026	Soumsoum, The Night of the Stars	Soumsoum, la nuit des astres	FIPRESCI Prize at the 76th Berlin International Film Festival

=== Shorts ===
- Maral Tanie (1994)
- Goi-Goi (1995)
- B 400 (1997)
- Letter from New York City (2001)

=== Documentaries ===
- Bord' Africa (1995)
- Sotigui Kouyate, a modern griot (1997)
- Kalala (2005)
- Hissane Habré: A Chadian Tragedy (2016)
