= Gotham Independent Film Award for Best International Feature =

Annual US film award

- Country: United States
- Presented by: The Gotham Film & Media Institute
- First award: 2020
- Currently held by: It Was Just an Accident (2025)
- Website: awards.thegotham.org

The Gotham Independent Film Award for Best International Feature is one of the annual Gotham Independent Film Awards and was first awarded in 2020, with Mexican-Spanish co-production Identifying Features, directed by Fernanda Valadez, being the first recipient of the award.

== Winners and nominees ==
=== 2020s ===
Year	Film title used in nomination	Original title	Director(s)	Producer(s)	Ref.
2020	Identifying Features	Sin Señas Particulares	Fernanda Valadez	Astrid Rondero	
2020	Bacurau		Kleber Mendonça Filho and Juliano Dornelles	Emilie Lesclaux, Saïd Ben Saïd, and Michel Merkt	
2020	Beanpole	Дылда	Kantemir Balagov	Alexander Rodnyansky and Sergey Melkumov	
2020	Cuties	Mignonnes	Maïmouna Doucouré	Zangro	
2020	Martin Eden		Pietro Marcello	Pietro Marcello, Beppe Caschetto, Thomas Ordonneau, Michael Weber, and Viola Fügen	
2020	Wolfwalkers		Tomm Moore and Ross Stewart	Paul Young, Nora Twomey, Tomm Moore, and Stéphan Roelants	
2021	Drive My Car	ドライブ・マイ・カー	Ryusuke Hamaguchi	Teruhisa Yamamoto	
2021	Azor		Andreas Fontana	Eugenia Mumenthaler and David Epiney	
2021	The Souvenir Part II		Joanna Hogg	Ed Guiney, Emma Norton, Andrew Low, Joanna Hogg, and Luke Schiller	
2021	Titane		Julia Ducournau	Jean-Christophe Reymond	
2021	What Do We See When We Look at the Sky?	რას ვხედავთ როდესაც ცას ვუყურებთ?	Alexandre Koberidze	Mariam Shatberashvili	
2021	The Worst Person in the World	Verdens verste menneske	Joachim Trier	Thomas Robsahm, Andrea Berentsen Ottmar, and Dyveke Bjørkly Graver	
2022	Happening	L'événement	Audrey Diwan	Edouard Weil and Alice Girard	
2022	Athena		Romain Gavras	Romain Gavras, Charles-Marie Anthonioz, Mourad Belkeddar, Jean Duhamel, Nicolas Lhermitte, and Ladj Ly	
2022	The Banshees of Inisherin		Martin McDonagh	Graham Broadbent, Pete Czernin, and Martin McDonagh	
2022	Corsage		Marie Kreutzer	Alexander Glehr, Johanna Scherz, Bernard Michaux, Jonas Dornbach, Janine Jackowski, Maren Ade, and Jean-Christophe Reymond	
2022	Decision to Leave	헤어질 결심	Park Chan-wook		
2022	Saint Omer		Alice Diop	Toufik Ayadi and Christophe Barral	
2023	Anatomy of a Fall	Anatomie d'une chute	Justine Triet	Marie-Ange Luciani and David Thion	
2023	All of Us Strangers		Andrew Haigh	Graham Broadbent, Pete Czernin, and Sarah Harvey	
2023	Poor Things		Yorgos Lanthimos	Ed Guiney, Yorgos Lanthimos, Andrew Lowe, and Emma Stone	
2023	Tótem		Lila Avilés	Lila Avilés, Tatiana Graullera, and Louise Riousse	
2023	The Zone of Interest		Jonathan Glazer	Ewa Puszczynska and James Wilson	
2024	All We Imagine as Light		Payal Kapadia	Julien Graff and Thomas Hakim	
2024	Green Border	Zielona granica	Agnieszka Holland	Fred Bernstein, Agnieszka Holland, and Marcin Wierzchoslawski	
2024	Hard Truths		Mike Leigh	Georgina Lowe	
2024	Inside the Yellow Cocoon Shell	Bên trong vỏ kén vàng	Phạm Thiên Ân	Jeremy Chua and Tran Van Thi	
2024	Vermiglio		Maura Delpero	Francesca Andreoli, Maura Delpero, Santiago Fondevila Sance, and Leonardo Guerra Seràgnoli	
2025	It Was Just an Accident	یک تصادف ساده	Jafar Panahi	Philippe Martin and Jafar Panahi	
2025	No Other Choice	어쩔수가없다	Park Chan-wook	Park Chan-Wook, Alexandre Gavras, Michèle Ray-Gavras, and Back Jisun	
2025	Nouvelle Vague		Richard Linklater	Laurent Pétin and Michèle Pétin	
2025	Resurrection	狂野时代	Bi Gan	Charles Gillibert, Yang Lele, and Shan Zuolong	
2025	Sound of Falling	In die Sonne schauen	Mascha Schilinski	Lucas Schmidt and Maren Schmitt	
2026	All of a Sudden	急に具合が悪くなる	Ryusuke Hamaguchi	Julien Deris, David Gauquié, Kosuke Oshida, and Yuji Sadai	
2026	Ben'Imana		Marie Clémentine Dusabejambo	Samantha Biffot, Pierre-Adrien Ceccaldi, Marie-Clémentine Dusabejambo, and Marie Epiphanie Uwayezu	
2026	Blue Heron		Sophy Romvari	Ryan Bobkin, Sara Wylie, Sophy Romvari, and Gábor Osváth	
2026	Everytime		Sandra Wollner	David Bohun, Lixi Frank, and Viktoria Stolpe	
2026	Fatherland	Ojczyzna	Paweł Pawlikowski	Edward Berger, Lorenzo Gangarossa, Mario Gianani, Lorenzo Mieli, Ewa Puszczynska, Dimitri Rassam, and Jeanne Tremsal	
2026	Filipiñana		Rafael Manuel	Bianca Balbuena, Jeremy Chua, Omar El Kadi, Bradley Liew, Rafael Manuel, Alex Polunin, and Nadia Turincev	
2026	La Gradiva		Marine Atlan	Inès Daïen Dasi	
2026	Minotaur	Минотавр	Andrey Zvyagintsev	Charles Gillibert, Nathanaël Karmitz, Marco Perego, and Andrey Zvyagintsev	
2026	Possible Love	가능한 사랑	Lee Chang-dong	Lee Joon-dong, Lee Chang-dong, David Levine, and Chadwick Prichard	
2026	Tender Loving Care		Mike Leigh	Georgina Lowe	

== See also ==
- Academy Award for Best International Feature Film
- Independent Spirit Award for Best International Film
