= Blue Heron (film) =

2025 Canadian drama film

- Theatrical release poster
- Directed by: Sophy Romvari
- Written by: Sophy Romvari
- Produced by: Ryan Bobkin; Sara Wylie; Sophy Romvari; Gábor Osváth
- Starring: Eylul Guven; Amy Zimmer; Ádám Tompa; Iringó Réti
- Cinematography: Maya Bankovic
- Edited by: Kurt Walker
- Music by: Blitz//Berlin
- Production companies: Nine Behind Productions; Boddah
- Distributed by: Blue Fox Entertainment (Canada)
- Release dates: August 8, 2025 (Locarno); April 2026 (Canada); June 11, 2026 (Hungary)
- Running time: 91 minutes
- Countries: Canada; Hungary
- Languages: English; Hungarian
- Box office: $833,183

Blue Heron is a 2025 drama film written and directed by Sophy Romvari, in her feature-length film directorial debut. The film, a Canadian-Hungarian co-production, is based in part on Romvari's own childhood and her previous short film Still Processing. It stars Eylul Guven as Sasha, the eight-year-old daughter of a Hungarian immigrant family who relocate to Vancouver Island in the late 1990s while their oldest son Jeremy (Edik Beddoes) displays increasingly dangerous behavioural issues in their new environment. The cast also includes Ádám Tompa and Iringó Réti as Sasha's parents, Liam Serg and Preston Drabble as Sasha's brothers, and Amy Zimmer as adult Sasha.

After winning accolades at international film festivals such as TIFF and Locarno, the film was released theatrically in Canada and the United States in April 2026.

== Plot ==
A Hungarian immigrant family relocate to Vancouver Island in the late 1990s. The family consists of the two parents, and four children. Jeremy is the couple's oldest son, but his father is from his mother's previous relationship. The remaining three children are a few years younger than Jeremy. Among them is Sasha, who is the youngest daughter.

Jeremy engages in risky and disruptive behavior such as petty theft, climbing to dangerous heights, disappearing for long lengths of time, bullying the other children, exhibiting bursts of rage, and creating annoying noises. Jeremy is emotionally and verbally closed off, talking infrequently and never discussing his internal feelings. At the same time Jeremy also demonstrates the capacity for occasional kindness towards his siblings and an exceptional talent in drawing maps of cities. The family struggles to understand Jeremy.

The parents have tried a variety of therapeutic and parental strategies to improve Jeremy's behavior, but nothing produces long-lasting improvements. After several more incidents, the parents consult with a social worker who recommends voluntary placement, where Jeremy would be sent to live with a different family. The parents are aghast at the suggestion, but also feel that they have exhausted all other options. They therefore proceed with the voluntary placement.

Years later in 2025, an adult Sasha attempts to process her memories of her late older brother with a video project. The project becomes a personal journey of understanding and reconciliation. Sasha gathers several social workers and hopes that thirty years of advancement in social work will provide an answer to Jeremy's behavior, thereby giving some closure to the family. Sasha is disappointed to hear that voluntary placement is once again the consensus strategy. Sasha despairs in her perceived failure to find the solution that would have worked for Jeremy. Sasha reaches out to everyone who knew Jeremy in the 1990s, including his high school friends and therapist. The film closes with a response from one of Jeremy's friends, who acknowledges the trouble that they often sought out, but also offers a more optimistic account of Jeremy than previously known.

== Cast ==
- Eylul Guven as Sasha
- Iringó Réti as Mother
- Ádám Tompa as Father
- Edik Beddoes as Jeremy
- Amy Zimmer as Adult Sasha
- Liam Serg as Henry
- Preston Drabble as Felix

== Background ==
Described as "semi-autobiographical," the film is based in part on Romvari's own childhood and her previous short film Still Processing.

In an essay for CBC Arts, Romvari described Blue Heron as her "most significant attempt to capture just how fallible memory is."

== Production ==
After winning grants from both Telefilm Canada and the National Film Institute Hungary, the film entered production in 2024 in British Columbia.

Blue Heron serves as Romvari's feature-length film directorial debut.

== Release ==
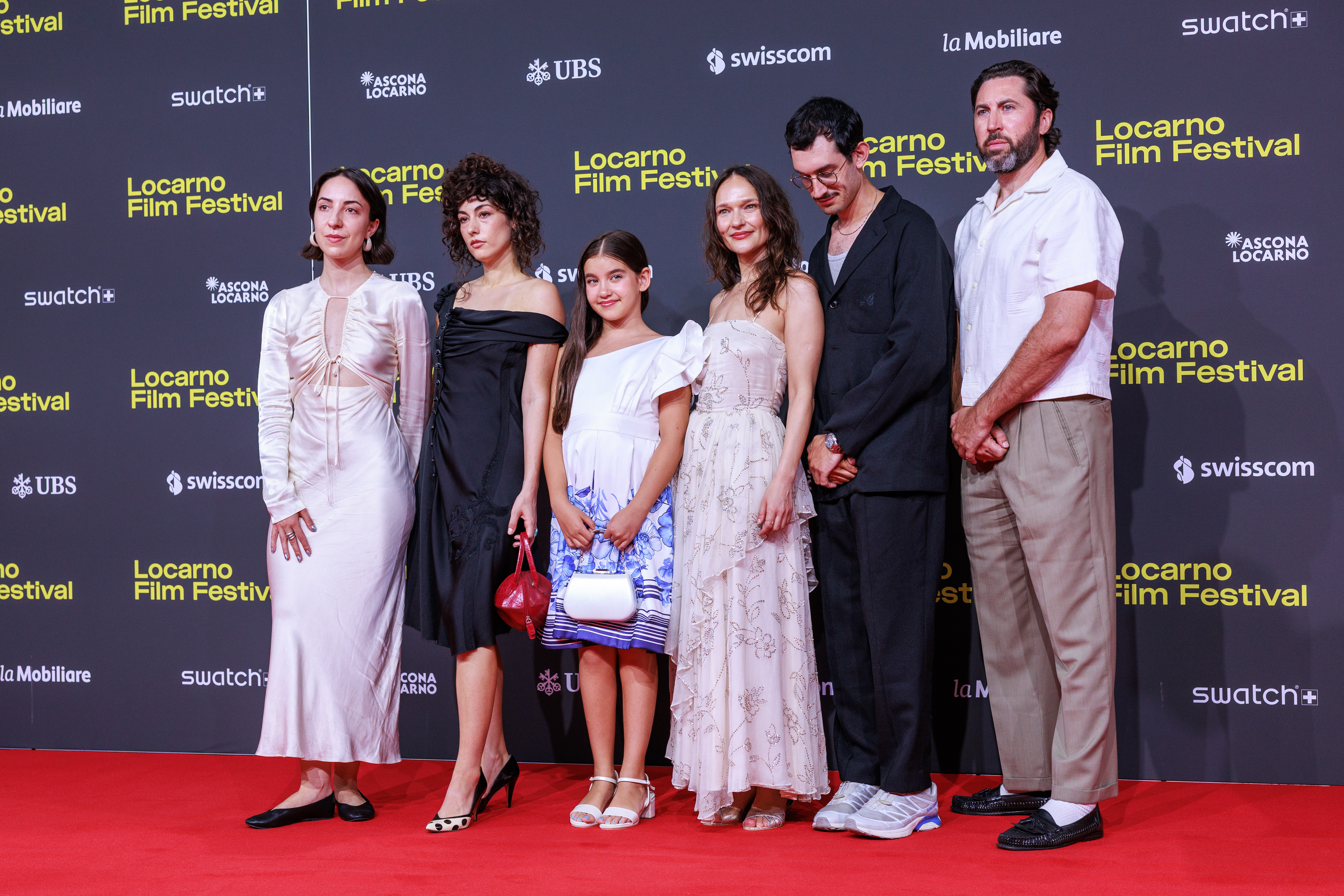
Cast and crew at the Locarno Film Festival premiere of the film in August 2025

Blue Heron had its world premiere at the 78th Locarno Film Festival on August 8, 2025, as part of the Concorso Cineasti del Presente competition. At Locarno, Romvari won the Swatch First Feature Award, which came with a CHF 15,000 prize.

The film had its Canadian premiere in the Centrepiece program at the 2025 Toronto International Film Festival, where Romvari took home the award for Best Canadian Discovery. It has since screened at dozens of film festivals internationally, including the 44th Vancouver International Film Festival, where it won several awards; the Festival du nouveau cinéma, where it won the Grand Prix; the 56th International Film Festival of India; the Bangkok International Film Festival; and San Sebastián, where it won a Special Mention from the jury. It was also screened in the Kinoscope section of the 32nd Sarajevo Film Festival in August 2026.

Blue Heron was acquired for commercial distribution in the United States by Janus Films in January 2026. The following month, Blue Fox Entertainment acquired the Canadian distribution rights to the film. The film was subsequently released in the United States and Canada in April 2026.

== Reception ==
=== Box office ===
Blue Heron has grossed $831,379 in the United States and Canada as of August 2026.

=== Critical response ===
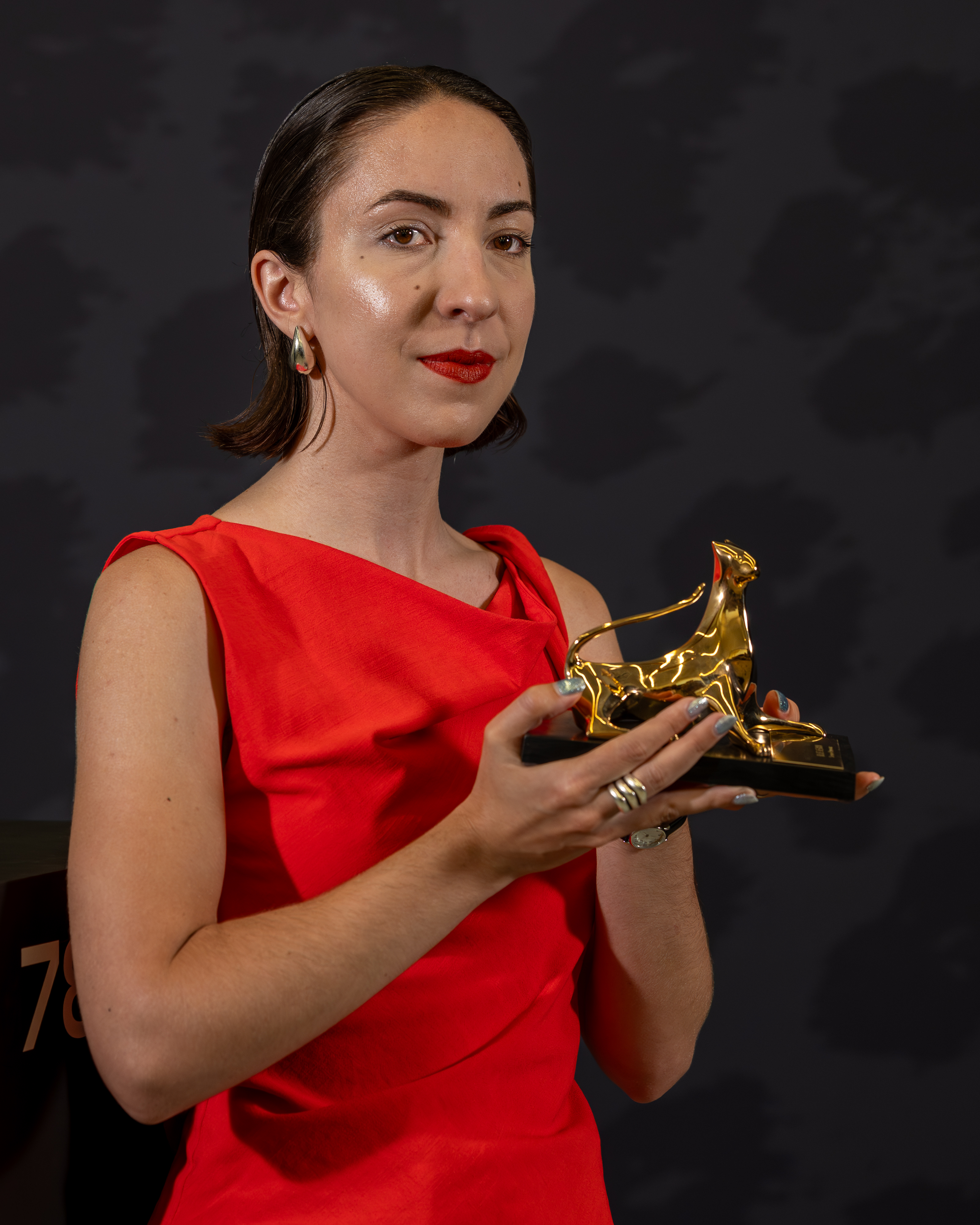
Romvari has earned critical acclaim and numerous awards for writing and directing Blue Heron

On review aggregator Rotten Tomatoes, 97% of 110 critic reviews of the film are positive, with an average rating of 8.8/10. The website's consensus reads: "A masterfully-assembled memory piece that goes a long way towards articulating life-altering grief, Blue Heron is deeply affecting and announces writer-director Sophy Romvari as an artist to watch." On Metacritic, which uses a weighted average, the film holds a score of 92 out of 100 based on 28 critics, indicating "universal acclaim".

Variety film critic Guy Lodge praised the film, calling it a "splintered, shattering memory piece." In a review for The Film Stage, Leonardo Gol wrote: "For a director whose projects have always tested the medium’s capacity to conjure and make peace with the specters of one’s past, it feels like the kind of moment Romvari’s been working towards from the start. For a brief, miraculous instant, Sasha’s catharsis is ours too."

For Screen Daily, Nikki Baughan wrote that "Blue Heron blurs the line between fact and fiction in a woozy, laconic way; this is a drama in which perspectives shift, timelines merge and soft-focus sequences are layered with a documentary-style aesthetic. It’s all part of the journey of recollection and discovery for protagonist Sasha – who we see as both a young girl and an adult – and for Romvari, who is using the narrative to unpick her own memories, to get to better grips with her own formative experiences."

The film was named to the Toronto International Film Festival's annual year-end Canada's Top Ten list for 2025.

During its theatrical release in the United States and Canada, The Hollywood Reporter described the film as "the most acclaimed film of 2026 so far."

=== Accolades ===
Award	Date of ceremony	Category	Recipient	Result	Ref.
Locarno Film Festival	16 August 2025	Golden Leopard – Filmmakers of the Present	Blue Heron	Nominated	
Locarno Film Festival	16 August 2025	Swatch First Feature Award	Blue Heron	Won	
Toronto International Film Festival	14 September 2025	Best Canadian Discovery	Blue Heron	Won	
Director's Guild of Canada	10 November 2025	Jean-Marc Vallée DGC Discovery Award	Blue Heron	Shortlisted	
Vancouver International Film Festival	8 October 2025	Horizon Award for Emerging Canadian Director	Blue Heron	Won	
Vancouver International Film Festival	8 October 2025	Arbutus Award for Best British Columbia Director	Blue Heron	Won	
Festival du nouveau cinéma	19 October 2025	National Competition, Grand Prix for Best Feature Film	Blue Heron	Won	
Toronto Film Critics Association	2 March 2026	Rogers Best Canadian Film	Blue Heron	Won	
Toronto Film Critics Association	2 March 2026	Best First Feature	Blue Heron	Won	
Vancouver Film Critics Circle	23 February 2026	Best Actress in a Canadian Film	Iringó Réti	Nominated	
Vancouver Film Critics Circle	23 February 2026	Best British Columbia Film	Blue Heron	Nominated	
Vancouver Film Critics Circle	23 February 2026	Best British Columbia Director	Sophy Romvari	Nominated	
Vancouver Film Critics Circle	23 February 2026	One to Watch	Sophy Romvari	Won	
Hong Kong International Film Festival	12 April 2026	Firebird Award (World)	Blue Heron	Nominated	
Hong Kong International Film Festival	12 April 2026	Best Actor	Edik Beddoes	Won	
Canadian Screen Awards	31 May 2026	Best Motion Picture	Ryan Bobkin, Sara Wylie, Sophy Romvari	Nominated	
Canadian Screen Awards	31 May 2026	Best Director	Sophy Romvari	Nominated	
Canadian Screen Awards	31 May 2026	Best Supporting Performance in a Drama Film	Edik Beddoes	Nominated	
Canadian Screen Awards	31 May 2026	Best Original Screenplay	Sophy Romvari	Nominated	
Canadian Screen Awards	31 May 2026	John Dunning Best First Feature	Sophy Romvari	Nominated	
Canadian Screen Awards	31 May 2026	Best Editing	Kurt Walker	Nominated	
Canadian Screen Awards	31 May 2026	Best Casting in a Film	Angela Quinn, Katrin Braga	Nominated	
Gotham Independent Film Awards	30 November 2026	Best International Feature	Sophy Romvari, Ryan Bobkin, Sara Wylie, Sophy Romvari, Gábor Osváth	Pending	
Gotham Independent Film Awards	30 November 2026	Breakthrough Director	Sophy Romvari	Pending	
Cinema Eye Honors	11 January 2027	Heterodox Award	Blue Heron	Pending	
