= Iringó Réti =

Romanian-Hungarian actress (born 1977)

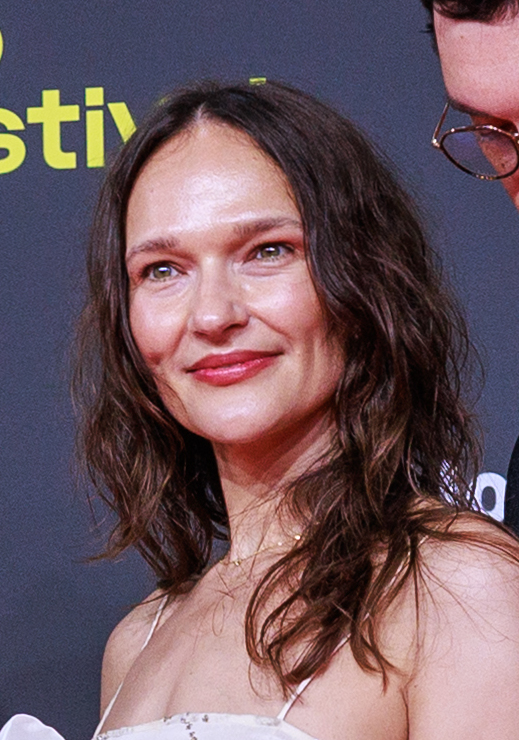
- Réti at the 78th Locarno Film Festival, 2025
- Born: 1977 (age 48–49); Târgu Mureș, Romania
- Occupation: Actress
- Known for: Blue Heron (2025)

Iringó Réti (born 1977) is a Romanian-Hungarian actress. She is most noted for her performance in Sophy Romvari's 2025 Canadian film Blue Heron, for which she received a Vancouver Film Critics Circle nomination for Best Female Actor in a Canadian Film at the Vancouver Film Critics Circle Awards 2025.
