= Lycée Paul Bert =

Lycée Paul Bert may refer to:

- Lycée Paul Bert in Paris
- Lycée Paul Bert in Bayonne
- Lycée Paul Bert in Maisons-Alfort (Paris area)
- Lycée Jacques Prévert in Boulogne-Billancourt, formerly Lycée Paul Bert
