= Marine Atlan =

French cinematographer and director (born 1989 or 1990)

- Atlan in 2026
- Born: 1989 or 1990 (age 36–37)
- Education: La Fémis
- Occupations: Cinematographer; director
- Years active: 2016–present

Marine Atlan (French pronunciation: [ma.ʁin at.lɑ̃]; born 1989 or 1990) is a French cinematographer and film director.

== Early life ==
Atlan was raised in Bagneux, Hauts-de-Seine. Both of her parents are teachers. Her father, who is Jewish, was born in Tunisia and moved to France at the age of seven; her paternal grandfather is Algerian. She has two older brothers.

She studied at Lycée Maurice Genevoix in Montrouge and Lycée Jacques Prévert in Boulogne-Billancourt, the latter from which she received a BTS certificate in audiovisual professions. After attending university for a year, she passed the entrance exam and enrolled at La Fémis. She later taught at Geneva University of Art and Design.

== Career ==
For most of her early career, Atlan worked primarily as a cinematographer. In 2016, she directed the short film Green Romances, and in 2018 she directed the short film Daniel; she also worked as the cinematographer on both films. In 2019, she was named one of 10 Europeans to Watch by Variety. The following year, she served on the jury of the Generation 14Plus section of the 70th Berlin International Film Festival. Her cinematography work on The Girl in the Snow (2025) earned nominations for Best Cinematography at the 51st César Awards and Best Cinematography at the 31st Lumière Awards in 2026.

Her feature-length directorial debut, La Gradiva, premiered in the Critics' Week section of the 2026 Cannes Film Festival, where it won the section's Grand Prize. It was also screened in the Centrepiece section of the 2026 Toronto International Film Festival.

== Filmography ==
| Year | Title | Cinematographer | Director | Writer | Notes | Ref. |
|---|---|---|---|---|---|---|
| 2016 | Green Romances | Yes | Yes | Yes | Short film | |
| 2016 | Blind Sex | Yes | No | No | Short film | |
| 2017 | After School Knife Fight | Yes | No | No | Short film | |
| 2018 | Jessica Forever | Yes | No | No | | |
| 2018 | Daniel | Yes | Yes | Yes | Short film | |
| 2019 | Romance, abscisse et ordonnée | Yes | No | No | Short film | |
| 2020 | Massacre | Yes | No | No | Short film | |
| 2020 | Le départ | Yes | No | No | Short film | |
| 2021 | The Day Today | Yes | No | No | | |
| 2021 | The Demons of Dorothy | Yes | No | No | Short film | |
| 2021 | Le cormoran | Yes | No | No | Short film | |
| 2021 | Fille de la mer Baltique | Yes | No | No | Short film | |
| 2022 | Nos cérémonies | Yes | No | No | | |
| 2022 | Des jeunes filles enterrent leur vie | Yes | No | No | Short film | |
| 2022 | Thunder | Yes | No | No | | |
| 2023 | The Rapture | Yes | No | No | | |
| 2023 | Room 999 | Yes | No | No | | |
| 2024 | Queens of Drama | Yes | No | No | | |
| 2025 | The Girl in the Snow | Yes | No | No | | |
| 2026 | La Gradiva | Yes | Yes | Yes | Co-written with Anne Brouillet | |

== Awards and nominations ==
| Award | Year | Category | Nominated work | Result | Ref. |
|---|---|---|---|---|---|
| Cannes Film Festival | 2026 | Critics' Week Grand Prize | La Gradiva | Won | |
| César Awards | 2026 | Best Cinematography | The Girl in the Snow | Nominated | |
| Chicago International Film Festival | 2026 | Best Director | La Gradiva | Won | |
| Gotham Independent Film Awards | 30 November 2026 | Best International Feature | La Gradiva | Pending | |
| Gotham Independent Film Awards | 30 November 2026 | Breakthrough Director | La Gradiva | Pending | |
| Gotham Independent Film Awards | 30 November 2026 | Best Original Screenplay | La Gradiva | Pending | |
| Lumière Awards | 2026 | Best Cinematography | The Girl in the Snow | Nominated | |
