= Gotham Independent Film Awards 2026 =

36th Annual Gotham Film Awards
- Date: November 30, 2026
- Location: Cipriani Wall Street, New York
- Country: United States
- Presented by: The Gotham Film & Media Institute

Highlights
- Most nominations: All of a Sudden, Clarissa, La Gradiva, The Invite, and Tender Loving Care (4)

The 36th Annual Gotham Film Awards, presented by the Gotham Film & Media Institute, will be held on November 30, 2026, at Cipriani Wall Street in New York City.

The nominees were announced on October 27, 2026. All of a Sudden, Clarissa, La Gradiva, The Invite, and Tender Loving Care all led the nominations with four each. The Audience Award made its return after being discontinued in 2021.

The films La bola negra, Michael, and Elsinore, Danny Boyle, Ellen Burstyn, Inde Navarrette, the stop-motion animation studio Laika, and the cast of Being Heumann will receive tribute awards.

== Nominees ==
Best Feature: Clarissa – Arie Esiri, Chuko Esiri, directors; Arie Esiri, Chuko Esiri, Theresa Park, Nicholas Weinstock, producers; Club Kid – Jordan Firstman, director; Michael Bloom, Alex Coco, Galen Core, Ryan Heller, producers; The Debut – Jesse Eisenberg, director; Jesse Eisenberg, Ali Herting, Dave McCary, Emma Stone, producers; Dreams in Nightmares – Shatara Michelle Ford, director; Naima Abed, Shatara Michelle Ford, Pin-Chun Liu, producers; The Invite – Olivia Wilde, director; Ben Browning, Megan Ellison, David Permut, producers; Josephine – Beth de Araújo, director; Beth de Araújo, Josh Beirne-Golden, Gemma Chan, David Kaplan, Josh Peters, Jordan Rapaport, Mark H. Rapaport, Robina Riccitiello, Marina Stabile, Channing Tatum, Crystine Zhang, producers; Mouse – Kelly O'Sullivan, Alex Thompson, directors; Bonnie Comley, Pierce Cravens, Steven A. Jones, Ian Keiser, Chelsea Krant, Stewart F. Lane, Abigail Rose Solomon, Alex Thompson, Alex Wilson, producers; Paper Tiger – James Gray, director; Andrea Bucko, Leonardo Maria del Vecchio, Gary Farkas, James Gray, Anthony Katagas, Andrea Leone, Raffaella Leone, Marco Perego, Carlo Salem, Rodrigo Teixeira, producers; Primetime – Lance Oppenheim, director; Ari Aster, Fred Berger, William Iannaccone, Brian Kavanaugh-Jones, Lars Knudsen, Brighton McCloskey, Robert Pattinson, producers; Teenage Sex and Death at Camp Miasma – Jane Schoenbrun, director; Dede Gardner, Jeremy Kleiner, producers; Your Mother Your Mother Your Mother – Bassam Tariq, director; Babak Anvari, Bassam Tariq, Lucan Toh, producers
Best Director: Ryusuke Hamaguchi – All of a Sudden; Sandra Wollner – Everytime; Andrey Zvyagintsev – Minotaur; Jane Schoenbrun – Teenage Sex and Death at Camp Miasma; Mike Leigh – Tender Loving Care	Breakthrough Director: Sophy Romvari – Blue Heron; Jordan Firstman – Club Kid; Aleshea Harris – Is God Is; Marine Atlan – La Gradiva; Joel Alfonso Vargas – Mad Bills to Pay (or Destiny, dile que no soy malo); John Early – Maddie's Secret
Best Original Screenplay: Everytime – Sandra Wollner; La Gradiva – Marine Atlan and Anne Brouillet; Possible Love – Lee Chang-dong and Oh Jung-mi; Tender Loving Care – Mike Leigh; Wild Horse Nine – Martin McDonagh	Best Adapted Screenplay: All of a Sudden – Ryusuke Hamaguchi; Clarissa – Chuko Esiri; The Invite – Will McCormack and Rashida Jones; Minotaur – Simon Lyashenko and Andrey Zvyagintsev; Primetime – Ajon Singh
Best Documentary Feature: Closure – Michal Marczak, director; Monika Braid, Rémi Grellety, Karolina Marczak, Michal Marczak, Katarzyna Szczerba, producers; A Fox Under a Pink Moon – Soraya Akhlaghi, Mehrdad Oskouei, directors; Siavash Jamali, Mehrdad Oskouei, producers; NAZA – Yuval Abraham, Rachel Szor, directors; Harry Davies, Lindsay Poulton, James Wilson, producers; Once Upon a Time in Harlem – David Greaves, director; Anne de Mare, Liani Greaves, producers; You Can See Everything – Nathan Fielder, Lance Oppenheim, directors; Maggie Ambrose, Tatiana Bears, Jack Davis, Nathan Fielder, Lance Oppenheim, producers	Best International Feature: All of a Sudden – Ryusuke Hamaguchi, director; Julien Deris, David Gauquié, Kosuke Oshida, Yuji Sadai, producers; Ben'Imana – Marie Clémentine Dusabejambo, director; Samantha Biffot, Pierre-Adrien Ceccaldi, Marie Clémentine Dusabejambo, Marie Epiphanie Uwayezu, producers; Blue Heron – Sophy Romvari, director; Ryan Bobkin, Sara Wylie, Sophy Romvari, Gábor Osváth, producers; Everytime – Sandra Wollner, director; David Bohun, Lixi Frank, Viktoria Stolpe, producers; Fatherland – Pawel Pawlikowski, director; Edward Berger, Lorenzo Gangarossa, Mario Gianani, Lorenzo Mieli, Ewa Puszczyńska, Dimitri Rassam, Jeanne Tremsal, producers; Filipiñana – Rafael Manuel, director; Bianca Balbuena, Jeremy Chua, Omar El Kadi, Bradley Liew, Rafael Manuel, Alex Polunin, Nadia Turincev, producers; La Gradiva – Marine Atlan, director; Inès Daïen Dasi, producer; Minotaur – Andrey Zvyagintsev, director; Charles Gillibert, Nathanaël Karmitz, Marco Perego, Andrey Zvyagintsev, producers; Possible Love – Lee Chang-dong, director; Lee Joon-dong, Lee Chang-dong, David Levine, Chadwick Prichard, producers; Tender Loving Care – Mike Leigh, director; Georgina Lowe, producer
Outstanding Lead Performance: Mahershala Ali – Your Mother Your Mother Your Mother as Latif; Gillian Anderson – Teenage Sex and Death at Camp Miasma as Billy Presley; Jeon Do-yeon – Possible Love as Mi-ok; John Early – Maddie's Secret as Madison "Maddie" Ralph; John Malkovich – Wild Horse Nine as Chris Carlisle; Ian McKellen – The Christophers as Julian Sklar; Julianne Moore – The Debut as Mona Friedman; Sophie Okonedo – Clarissa as Clarissa; Andrew Scott – Elsinore as Ian Charleson; John Turturro – The Only Living Pickpocket in New York as Harry Lehman	Outstanding Supporting Performance: Tom Courtenay – Queen at Sea as Martin; Esmé Creed-Miles – Sense and Sensibility as Marianne Dashwood; Penélope Cruz – The Invite as Pina; Adam Driver – Paper Tiger as Gary Pearl; Andrew Garfield – Artificial as Sam Altman; Skyler Gisondo – Primetime as Daniel "Dan" Plum; Sandra Hüller – Fatherland as Erika Mann; Kate O'Flynn – Tender Loving Care as Amy; Tao Okamoto – All of a Sudden as Mari Morisaki; Channing Tatum – Josephine as Damien
Breakthrough Performer: Adia – Your Mother Your Mother Your Mother as Fatiha; India Amarteifio – Clarissa as Young Clarissa; Guitarricadelafuente – La bola negra as Sebastián; Colas Quignard – La Gradiva as Toni; Mason Reeves – Josephine as Josephine	Audience Award: Backrooms; La bola negra; The Drama; The Invite; Michael; Obsession; Project Hail Mary; You Can See Everything

=== Films with multiple nominations ===
Films that received multiple nominations
Nominations	Film
4	All of a Sudden
4	Clarissa
4	La Gradiva
4	The Invite
4	Tender Loving Care
3	Everytime
3	Josephine
3	Minotaur
3	Possible Love
3	Primetime
3	Teenage Sex and Death at Camp Miasma
3	Your Mother Your Mother Your Mother
2	Blue Heron
2	La bola negra
2	Club Kid
2	The Debut
2	Fatherland
2	Maddie's Secret
2	Paper Tiger
2	Wild Horse Nine
2	You Can See Everything

== Special awards ==
=== Anniversary Tribute ===
- Laika

=== Director Tribute ===
- Danny Boyle – Ink

=== Ensemble Tribute ===
- Being Heumann – Ruth Madeley, Mark Ruffalo, Madeline Delp, Roberta Colindrez, Jon Beavers, Antwan Tolliver, Ray Fisher, Andrew Pilkington, Michael Patrick Thornton, Russell Harvard, Daniel Durant, Charlie Rush-Reese, Rio Finnegan, D'Arcee Charington Neal, Will Brill, Rob Delaney, Matthew August Jeffers, Siena Rafter, Rein Barcel, Stephen Adly Guirgis, Dylan O'Brien, Bernard Telsey, and Adam Caldwell

=== Legacy Tribute ===
- Elsinore

=== Musical Tribute ===
- Antoine Fuqua, Graham King, Colman Domingo, Jaafar Jackson, and Nia Long – Michael

=== Performer Tribute ===
- Ellen Burstyn

=== Spotlight Tribute ===
- Inde Navarrette – Obsession

=== Vanguard Tribute ===
- La bola negra – Javier Calvo, Javier Ambrossi, Guitarricadelafuente, Miguel Bernardeau, Carlos González, Milo Quifes, Lola Dueñas, Penélope Cruz, and Glenn Close
