= La Gradiva =

2026 film by Marine Atlan

- French theatrical release poster
- Directed by: Marine Atlan
- Screenplay by: Marine Atlan; Anne Brouillet
- Produced by: Inès Daïen Dasi
- Starring: Colas Quignard; Antonia Buresi; Mitia Capellier-Audat; Suzanne Gerin
- Cinematography: Pierre Mazoyer; Marine Atlan
- Edited by: Guillaume Lillo
- Production companies: Les Films du Poisson; Bibi Film; Arte France Cinéma
- Distributed by: Tandem (France); Fandango (Italy)
- Release dates: 16 May 2026 (Cannes); 21 October 2026 (France); 12 November 2026 (Italy)
- Running time: 144 minutes
- Countries: France; Italy
- Languages: French; Italian

La Gradiva is a 2026 coming-of-age drama film directed by Marine Atlan in her feature-length film directorial debut, co-written with Anne Brouillet. A co-production of France and Italy, it stars Antonia Buresi alongside newcomers Colas Quignard, Mitia Capellier-Audat, and Suzanne Gerin, and follows a French high school class as they travel to Pompeii shortly before their graduation.

The film had its world premiere in the Critics' Week section of the 79th Cannes Film Festival on 16 May 2026, where it won the section's Grand Prize and was nominated for the Caméra d'Or and Queer Palm. It received widespread critical acclaim, with praise towards the direction, screenplay, and cinematography. It was theatrically released in France by Tandem on 21 October 2026 and in Italy by Fandango on 12 November 2026.

== Plot ==
During a school trip to Pompeii, James and Angela have sex in the train cabin, while Toni and Suzanne take a quick look from the outside. Shortly after, Toni shares with some of his classmates his Italian heritage through his maternal grandmother, a former maid of an aristocratic family in Naples, who had fled the country pregnant after the death of her boss and lover during the 1980 Irpinia earthquake. Suzanne, a seemingly introverted teenager, fails to convince Toni to work with her on the trip's assignment.

In Naples, Toni ignites an affair with a local over Grindr, but lies about his age and pretends to be traveling with his college classmates. Madame Mercier, a Latin teacher, had organized the week-long trip with her class during the final weeks of the school year, since most of the students came from a diverse working class background and had never left France. Meanwhile, Toni is motivated to search for his maternal grandmother's family.

Suzanne and many other classmates are visibly annoyed by Toni's troublemaking behavior during the class's visit to one of the city's archeological sites, mostly Madame Mercier, who calls him "dumb" in front of the class. In a restaurant, Mercier also refuses to discuss politics with the students, and watches some of the classmates in a heated discussion about the supposed recurrent strikes in the country, where Amaury admits supporting the French far-right, outraging James and Jean-Eudes.

Angela shares, in the girls' room, her disappointment with James's ghosting after they had sex in the train cab, while Suzanne admits being insecure about her own image, feeling she is not sexually desired by her classmates. After a small party, an apparently drunk Toni tries to kiss James, who rebuffs him. He later writes an emotional essay about his feelings towards his family and Naples before leaving for his affair's apartment. In a dream, Suzanne wanders through Pompeii and has sex with James, and later Angela, both in the train cabin.

The following morning, on their way to the National Archaeological Museum, Madame Mercier confesses to being exhausted and overwhelmed during a quick conversation with the bus driver. During the museum visit, Madame Mercier refuses to accept Toni's late essay. Toni calls his mother, who appears to be dependent on him and uninterested in her son's trip. Afterwards, Suzanne pranks James with red paint in his jacket, which causes a small argument between him and Toni. Madame Mercier and James walk back to the hotel, where she invites him to her room, but decides not to kiss him at the last moment. James tries to make amends with Toni, but is rebuffed.

Suzanne observes friction between Toni and James when Mercier returns the essays with constructive criticism for James. An upset Toni is surprised when Suzanne asks to accompany him on his planned trip to his grandfather's former mansion using a borrowed motorcycle. Toni realizes the mansion was never destroyed by the earthquake, while Suzanne helps him to reflect how the relationship between his maternal grandparents could not be consensual. After visiting the mansion, they find the motorcycle had been stolen, as Toni had left its keys in it. At the hotel, the class shares their college admission results. James fears living the same life of his mother, and Toni shares a passionate hug with him and refuses to further explain about his trip with Suzanne.

As Madame Mercier celebrates with her class, Toni leaves his phone and wallet behind in the room and departs to the city's harbor. On the way, he hears a voicemail being left by the motorcycle owner asking him to return his bike. James and Suzanne notify Madame Mercier about Toni's strange behavior and the belongings he left behind, and as she calls the police, she decides to finally read his essay, realizing the degree of his emotional pain. Toni rows a small boat into the harbor.

The next morning, the police confirm that Toni was found dead on the beach, leaving James emotionally overwhelmed. In a voice-over, Suzanne shares that Toni was framed by others as emotionally unstable, a liar, and a drug addict, and how James never recovered from his death, quitting the last week of class and his college application altogether. Suzanne mentions that Madame Mercier discusses Toni in all her classes, in presumably positive tones, she imagines.

== Cast ==
- Colas Quignard as Toni
- Antonia Buresi as Madame Mercier
- Suzanne Gerin as Suzanne
- Mitia Capellier-Audat as James
- Rouge Isaac as Amaury
- Hadya Fofana as Angela
- Lou-Ann Le Glorennec as Constance
- Chamathka Warahena as Chamathka
- Cherazade Hammedi as Cherazade
- Camille Ménard-Harnish as Étienne
- Gustave Tersiguel as Hugo
- Mathéo De Carlo as Jean-Eudes
- Alma Polgar as Juliette
- Mariam Bouras as Mariam
- Léonilde Moucheroud as Pauline
- Emmanuelle Lafon as Madame Paquin
- Lila Latronche as Rose
- Anna Heckel as Rebecca
- Romaïssa Taleb as Safia
- Djimo Salim Nassokho as Salim
- Kessy Mendy as Sarah
- Youssef Ben Hadj Amor as Younes

== Production ==
The film was shot on location in Naples (top), with filming locations including the National Archaeological Museum (bottom).

=== Development ===
La Gradiva marks director Marine Atlan's debut feature film, which she co-wrote with Anne Brouillet. The film was inspired by the television film collection Tous les garçons et les filles de leur âge (1994). Atlan was also inspired to create the film after reading Wilhelm Jensen's 1903 novella, Gradiva, to which the film's title refers. She stated, "I wanted to create a kind of clash between the group of youngsters, their present reality, and the eternal nature of the [Pompeiian] ruins".

The film was produced by Inès Daïen Dasi for Les Films du Poisson, in co-production with Arte France Cinéma and Angelo Barbagallo's Bibi Film.

=== Casting ===
The casting process took place over two years, and consisted mainly of street castings at high schools, political demonstrations, and non-professional acting classes. Mitia Capellier-Audat, who plays James, was cast at the annual anarchist demonstration of 1 May in Paris. The majority of the cast comprises newcomers, however, Atlan personally approached actress Antonia Buresi to play the role of Madame Mercier.

=== Filming ===
Principal photography began on 7 April 2025. The film was shot on location in and around Naples, specifically at the National Archaeological Museum; Torre del Greco; and Pompeii; until 21 May. Later that year, the students' train journey was shot in Clermont-Ferrand over five days, from 27 to 31 October 2025. The two trains used in filming were provided by Train à Vapeur d'Auvergne. The first cut of the film was four hours long, but was later trimmed to 145 minutes.

== Release ==
Atlan attending the presentation of the film at the 71st Valladolid International Film Festival.

The film had its world premiere in the Critics' Week section of the 79th Cannes Film Festival on 16 May 2026. It was also selected for the Centrepiece section of the 2026 Toronto International Film Festival, the Main Slate of the 2026 New York Film Festival, the official section of the 71st Valladolid International Film Festival (for its Spain premiere), and the EFA Selection section of the 23rd Seville European Film Festival. It will compete for the Bronze Horse at the 2026 Stockholm International Film Festival.

A trailer was released on 22 September 2026. The film was theatrically released in France by Tandem on 21 October 2026. It was theatrically released in Italy by Fandango on 12 November 2026. Following its Cannes premiere, the North American distribution rights were acquired by 1-2 Special, and it is scheduled to be theatrically released in the United States on 18 December 2026. Metis Films acquired United Kingdom and Ireland rights to the film.

== Reception ==
=== Critical response ===
On the review aggregator website Rotten Tomatoes, 93% of 30 critics' reviews are positive, with an average rating of 9.2/10. Metacritic, which uses a weighted average, assigned the film a score of 98 out of 100, based on 10 critics, indicating "universal acclaim".

In his five-star review, Peter Bradshaw of The Guardian called the film "stunning" and "superbly acted and directed". Cédric Succivalli of the International Cinephile Society also gave the film a five-star rating, finding that it "stay[s] lodged in the body like ash, like the imprint of a life cut short at the precise moment it was becoming itself". Amber Wilkinson of Screen Daily called the film "an ambitious, layered work", specifically noting the film's realistic teenage dialogue and "avoidance of coming-of-age cliches". Giving the film an A rating for IndieWire, Marya E. Gates called it a "wholly transporting story of youth". She gave special praise to cinematography as well as the actors' performances, specifically that of Colas Quignard. Fabien Lemercier of Cineuropa commended La Gradiva as a "multi-faceted and particularly accomplished first feature film".

=== Accolades ===
Award	Date of ceremony	Category	Recipient(s)	Result	Ref.
Cannes Film Festival	23 May 2026	Critics' Week Grand Prize	La Gradiva	Won	
Cannes Film Festival	23 May 2026	Queer Palm	La Gradiva	Nominated	
Cannes Film Festival	23 May 2026	Caméra d'Or	La Gradiva	Nominated	
New Horizons Film Festival	2 August 2026	Grand Prix	La Gradiva	Nominated	
New Horizons Film Festival	2 August 2026	Audience Award	La Gradiva	Won	
Melbourne International Film Festival	23 August 2026	Bright Horizons Award	La Gradiva	Won	
Queer Lisboa International Queer Film Festival	26 September 2026	Best Feature Film	La Gradiva	Won	
Queer Lisboa International Queer Film Festival	26 September 2026	Audience Award	La Gradiva	Won	
Reykjavík International Film Festival	6 October 2026	Golden Puffin	La Gradiva	Won	
Film Fest Gent	17 October 2026	Grand Prix	La Gradiva	Won	
Chicago International Film Festival	23 October 2026	Best Director	Marine Atlan	Won	
Chicago International Film Festival	23 October 2026	Best Ensemble Performance	Cast of La Gradiva	Won	
Valladolid International Film Festival	31 October 2026	Silver Spike for Best Film	La Gradiva	Won	
Valladolid International Film Festival	31 October 2026	'José Salcedo' Award for Best Editing	Guillaume Lillo	Won	
Valladolid International Film Festival	31 October 2026	Rainbow Spike	La Gradiva	Won	
Gotham Independent Film Awards	30 November 2026	Best International Feature	Marine Atlan, Inès Daïen Dasi	Pending	
Gotham Independent Film Awards	30 November 2026	Breakthrough Director	Marine Atlan	Pending	
Gotham Independent Film Awards	30 November 2026	Best Original Screenplay	Marine Atlan, Anne Brouillet	Pending	
Gotham Independent Film Awards	30 November 2026	Breakthrough Performer	Colas Quignard	Pending	
British Independent Film Awards	6 December 2026	Best International Independent Film	Marine Atlan, Anne Brouilet, Inès Daïen Dasi	Pending	
European Film Awards	16 January 2027	Best European Film	La Gradiva	Pending	
