= Edik Beddoes =

Canadian actor

Edik Beddoes is a Canadian actor from Vancouver, British Columbia. He is most noted for his performance in the 2025 film Blue Heron, for which he received a Canadian Screen Award nomination for Best Supporting Performance in a Drama Film at the 14th Canadian Screen Awards in 2026.
