= Gotham Independent Film Award for Outstanding Supporting Performance =

Annual US film award

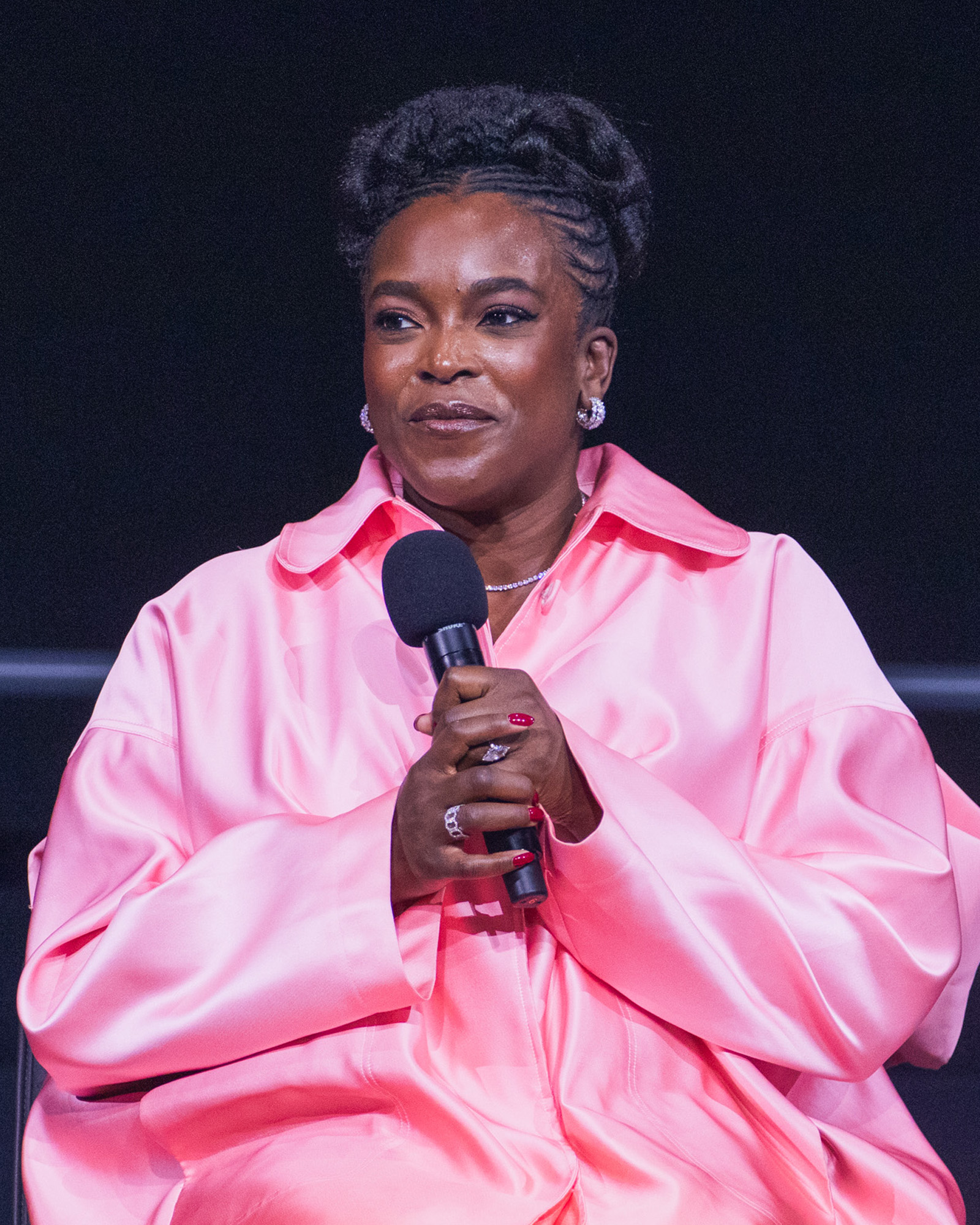
- The 2025 recipient: Wunmi Mosaku
- Country: United States
- Presented by: The Gotham Film & Media Institute
- First award: 2021
- Currently held by: Wunmi Mosaku for Sinners (2025)
- Website: awards.thegotham.org

The Gotham Independent Film Award for Outstanding Supporting Performance is one of the annual Gotham Independent Film Awards and was first awarded in 2021.

It is a gender neutral award and was introduced for the Gotham Independent Film Awards 2021 to replace the awards for Best Actor and Best Actress given out in previous years.

== Winners and nominees ==
=== 2020s ===
Year	Winner and nominees	Film	Role	Ref.
2021	Troy Kotsur	CODA	Frank Rossi	
2021	Reed Birney	Mass	Richard	
2021	Jessie Buckley	The Lost Daughter	Young Leda Caruso	
2021	Colman Domingo	Zola	Abegunde "X" Olawale	
2021	Gaby Hoffmann	C'mon C'mon	Viv	
2021	Marlee Matlin	CODA	Jackie Rossi	
2021	Ruth Negga	Passing	Clare Bellew	
2022	Ke Huy Quan	Everything Everywhere All at Once	Waymond Wang	
2022	Jessie Buckley	Women Talking	Mariche	
2022	Raúl Castillo	The Inspection	Rosales	
2022	Hong Chau	The Whale	Liz	
2022	Brian Tyree Henry	Causeway	James	
2022	Nina Hoss	Tár	Sharon Goodnow	
2022	Noémie Merlant	Tár	Francesca Lentini	
2022	Mark Rylance	Bones and All	Sully	
2022	Gabrielle Union	The Inspection	Inez French	
2022	Ben Whishaw	Women Talking	August	
2023	Charles Melton	May December	Joe Yoo	
2023	Juliette Binoche	The Taste of Things	Eugénie	
2023	Penélope Cruz	Ferrari	Laura Ferrari	
2023	Jamie Foxx	They Cloned Tyrone	Slick Charles	
2023	Claire Foy	All of Us Strangers	Mum	
2023	Ryan Gosling	Barbie	Ken	
2023	Glenn Howerton	BlackBerry	Jim Balsillie	
2023	Sandra Hüller	The Zone of Interest	Hedwig Höss	
2023	Rachel McAdams	Are You There God? It's Me, Margaret.	Barbara Simon	
2023	Da’Vine Joy Randolph	The Holdovers	Mary Lamb	
2024	Clarence Maclin	Sing Sing	Himself	
2024	Yura Borisov	Anora	Igor	
2024	Kieran Culkin	A Real Pain	Benji Kaplan	
2024	Danielle Deadwyler	The Piano Lesson	Berniece Charles	
2024	Brian Tyree Henry	The Fire Inside	Jason Crutchfield	
2024	Jack Haven	I Saw the TV Glow	Maddy Wilson	
2024	Natasha Lyonne	His Three Daughters	Rachel	
2024	Katy O'Brian	Love Lies Bleeding	Jackie Cleaver	
2024	Guy Pearce	The Brutalist	Harrison Lee Van Buren	
2024	Adam Pearson	A Different Man	Oswald	
2025	Wunmi Mosaku	Sinners	Annie	
2025	Benicio del Toro	One Battle After Another	Sergio St. Carlos	
2025	Jacob Elordi	Frankenstein	The Creature	
2025	Inga Ibsdotter Lilleaas	Sentimental Value	Agnes Borg Pettersen	
2025	Indya Moore	Father Mother Sister Brother	Skye	
2025	Adam Sandler	Jay Kelly	Ron Sukenick	
2025	Andrew Scott	Blue Moon	Richard Rodgers	
2025	Alexander Skarsgård	Pillion	Ray	
2025	Stellan Skarsgård	Sentimental Value	Gustav Borg	
2025	Teyana Taylor	One Battle After Another	Perfidia Beverly Hills	
2026	Tom Courtenay	Queen at Sea	Martin	
2026	Esmé Creed-Miles	Sense and Sensibility	Marianne Dashwood	
2026	Penélope Cruz	The Invite	Pina	
2026	Adam Driver	Paper Tiger	Gary Pearl	
2026	Andrew Garfield	Artificial	Sam Altman	
2026	Skyler Gisondo	Primetime	Dan Plum	
2026	Sandra Hüller	Fatherland	Erika Mann	
2026	Kate O'Flynn	Tender Loving Care	Amy	
2026	Tao Okamoto	All of a Sudden	Mari Morisaki	
2026	Channing Tatum	Josephine	Damien	

== Multiple wins and nominations ==
Individuals receiving multiple nominations:

Nominations	Performer
2	Jessie Buckley
2	Penélope Cruz
2	Brian Tyree Henry
2	Sandra Hüller

== See also ==
- Independent Spirit Award for Best Supporting Male
- Independent Spirit Award for Best Supporting Female
