= Tao Okamoto =

Japanese actress (born 1985)

- 岡本 多緒
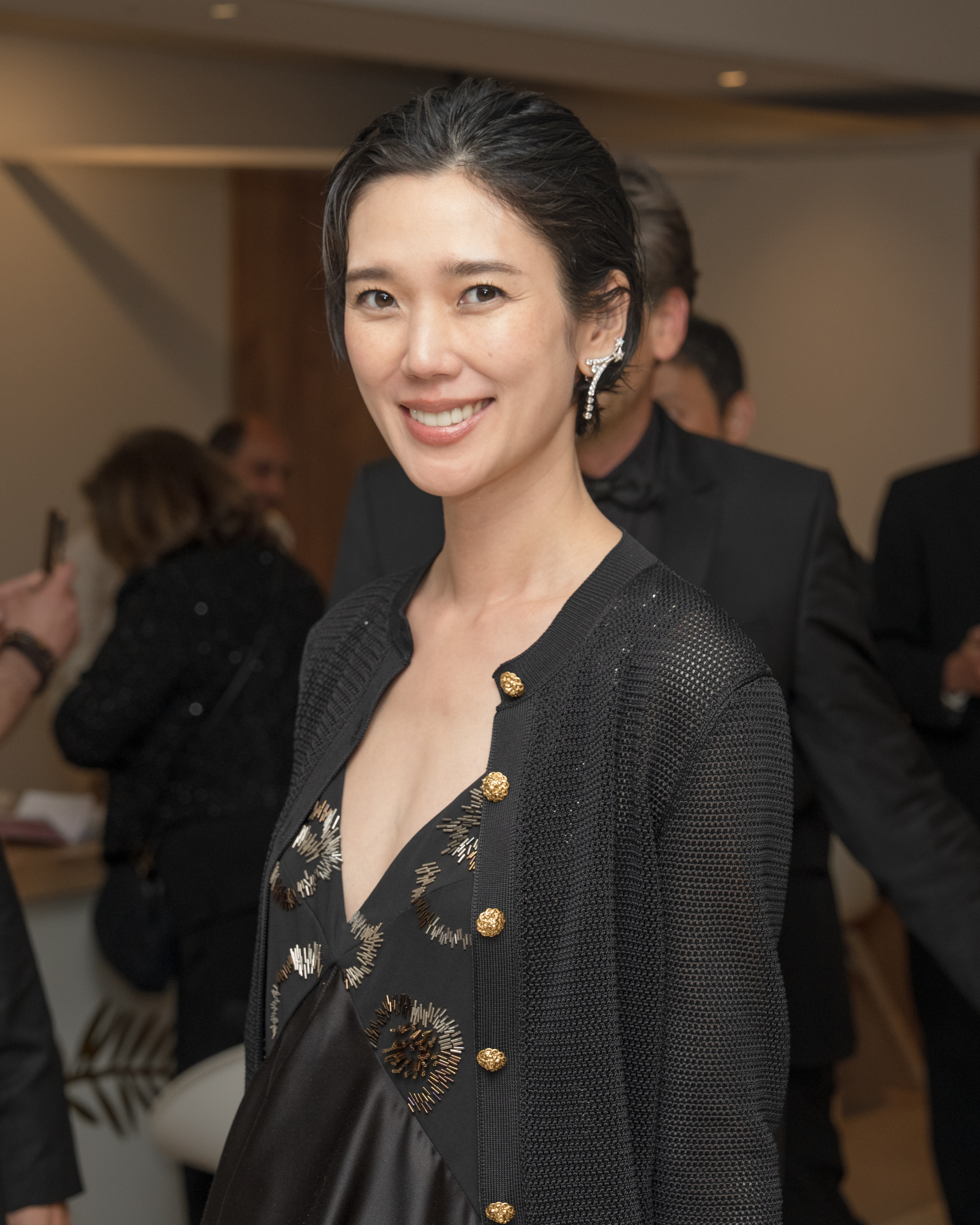
- Okamoto in 2026
- Born: May 22, 1985 (age 41); Ichikawa, Chiba, Japan
- Occupations: Model, actress
- Years active: 1999–present
- Spouse: Tenzin Wild (m. 2015)
- Modeling information
- Height: 1.77 m (5 ft 9 1/2 in)
- Hair color: Black
- Eye color: Brown

Tao Okamoto (岡本 多緒, Okamoto Tao; born May 22, 1985), also known professionally by the mononym Tao, is a Japanese actress and model. In 2009, she was one of the faces of Ralph Lauren.

She made her film debut as the female lead Mariko Yashida in the 2013 film The Wolverine; and played Mercy Graves in the 2016 film Batman v Superman: Dawn of Justice. She has had recurring roles in the television series Hannibal, The Man in the High Castle, and Westworld. In 2026, she was awarded the Cannes Film Festival Award for Best Actress for her performance in the drama All of a Sudden.

== Early life ==
Tao was born in Ichikawa, Chiba. She started modeling as a teenager in Japan, when she was 14 years old.

== Career ==
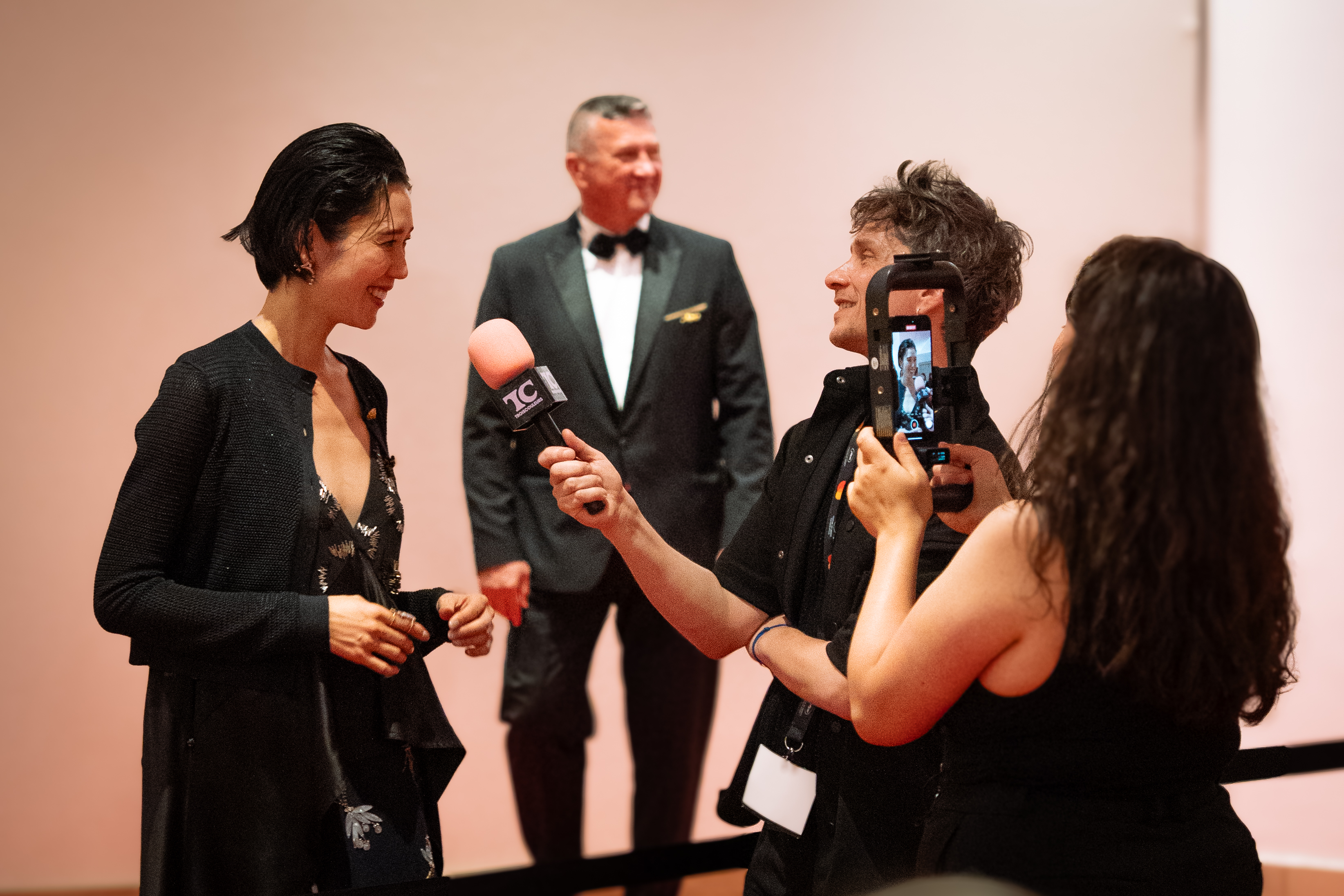
Tao Okamoto, winner of the Best Performance by an Actress Award for “All Of A Sudden” speaks during the Palme d'Or winners press conference at the 79th annual Cannes Film Festival at Palais des Festivals on May 23, 2026 in Cannes, France.

=== Modeling ===
In 2006, she made a decision to move to Paris and develop her career on an international level. Soon after that, Tao made her debut on the European runways, one of the few prominent East Asian models of that era.

In 2009, Tao moved to New York City.

Tao has worked in advertising and editorial projects. She has fronted campaigns such as Dolce & Gabbana with Mario Testino, Emporio Armani by Alasdair McLellan, Kenzo with Mario Sorrenti, and Tommy Hilfiger with Craig McDean. Editorially, she has shot for i-D Magazine, V Magazine, W Magazine, and various international editions of Harper's Bazaar and Vogue.

The November 2009 issue of Vogue Nippon (Japanese Vogue) is dedicated to Tao. She was the Japan Fashion Editor's Club "Model of the Year" and was one of Vogue Nippon's "Women of the Year" in 2010.

Okamoto has modeled for Alexander McQueen, Alexander Wang, Burberry Prorsum, Bottega Veneta, Chanel, Dolce & Gabbana, Donna Karan, Emanuel Ungaro, Fendi, Giorgio Armani, Givenchy, Hermès, Jean-Paul Gaultier, Kenzo, Louis Vuitton, Marc Jacobs, Maison Martin Margiela, Max Mara, Miu Miu, Moschino, Paul Smith, Phillip Lim, Ralph Lauren, Salvatore Ferragamo, Tommy Hilfiger, Vivienne Westwood, Yves Saint Laurent and more.

=== Acting ===
In 2013, Tao made her film debut as Mariko Yashida, opposite Hugh Jackman, in The Wolverine. In October 2014, it was announced that she had joined the cast of Hannibal as Chiyoh, Hannibal Lecter's family servant. In January 2015, it was announced that Tao would star in the film Crossroads with Alodia Gosiengfiao. In 2015, Tao appeared in The Man in the High Castle as Betty Kasoura, wife of lawyer Paul Kasoura and a customer at Robert Childan's American Artistic Handcrafts. In 2016, Tao played Mercy Graves in the film Batman v Superman: Dawn of Justice.

== Personal life ==
In 2015, Okamoto married Tenzin Wild, the Swiss co-editor-in-chief of The Last Magazine.

== Filmography ==
=== Film ===
Year	Title	Role	Notes	Ref.
2013	The Wolverine	Mariko Yashida	Feature film debut	
2015	Crossroads	Shiho Nomura		
2016	Batman v Superman: Dawn of Justice	Mercy Graves		
2017	Manhunt	Kiko Tanaka		
2018	Laplace's Witch	Rei Kirimiya		
2019	Lost Transmissions	Wendi		
2019	She's Just a Shadow	Irene		
2023	The Silent Service	Ryoko Funao		
2023	Sun & Moon		Short film; Also director, writer and producer	
2025	The Silent Service: The Battle of the Arctic Ocean	Ryoko Funao		
2025	Out of Order	Lisa		
2025	My Sweet Pala	—N/a	Short film; Director	
2026	All of a Sudden	Mari Morisaki	Lead role	

=== Television ===
Year	Title	Role	Notes	Ref.
2014	Chi no Wadachi	Toko Sakagami	Mini-series on Japanese TV	
2015	Hannibal	Chiyoh	4 episodes	
2015	The Man in the High Castle	Betty	4 episodes	
2018–2020	Westworld	Hanaryo	5 episodes	
2024	The Silent Service	Ryoko Funao		

== Accolades ==
=== Awards and nominations ===
Name of the award ceremony, year presented, category, nominee of the award, and the result of the nomination
Award	Year	Category	Nominated work	Result	Ref.
Asia Pacific Screen Awards	2026	Best Performance	All of a Sudden	Nominated	
Cannes Film Festival	2026	Best Actress	All of a Sudden	Won	
Gotham Independent Film Awards	2026	Outstanding Supporting Performance	All of a Sudden	Pending	
Nikkan Sports Film Awards	2026	Best Actress	All of a Sudden	Pending	
