= All of a Sudden (2026 film) =

Film by Ryusuke Hamaguchi

- Japanese theatrical release poster
- French: Soudain
- Literally: Suddenly
- Japanese: 急に具合が悪くなる
- Literally: Suddenly Feeling Unwell
- Directed by: Ryusuke Hamaguchi
- Screenplay by: Ryusuke Hamaguchi; Léa Le Dimna
- Based on: When Life Suddenly Takes a Turn: Twenty Letters Between a Philosopher with Terminal Cancer and Medical Anthropologist by Makiko Miyano and Maho Isono
- Produced by: Renan Artukmaç; Bettina Brokemper; Charlotte Dauphin; Julien Deris; David Gauquié; Charles-Henri de La Rochefoucauld; Hiroko Matsuda; Jean-Luc Ormières; Kôsuke Oshida; Joseph Rouschop; Yûji Sadai
- Starring: Virginie Efira; Tao Okamoto; Kyōzō Nagatsuka; Kodai Kurosaki; Jean-Charles Clichet; Marie Bunel; Romain Cottard; Marie Denarnaud
- Cinematography: Alan Guichaoua
- Edited by: Azusa Yamazaki
- Music by: Samuel Andreyev
- Production companies: Cinefrance Studios; Office Shirous; Bitters End; Heimatfilm; Tarantula; Gapbusters; Arte France Cinéma; Same Player; Marignan Films; Soudain JPN Partners; Shelter Prod
- Distributed by: Diaphana Distribution (France); Bitters End (Japan)
- Release dates: 15 May 2026 (Cannes); 19 June 2026 (Japan); 12 August 2026 (France)
- Running time: 197 minutes
- Countries: France; Japan; Germany; Belgium
- Languages: French; Japanese

All of a Sudden (French: Soudain, lit. 'Suddenly'; Japanese: 急に具合が悪くなる, romanized: Kyū ni Guai ga Waruku Naru, lit. 'Suddenly Feeling Unwell') is a 2026 drama film directed by Ryusuke Hamaguchi, in his French-language debut. Co-written by Hamaguchi and Léa Le Dimna, it is loosely based on the 2019 non-fiction book Kyū ni Guai ga Waruku Naru (急に具合が悪くなる, When Life Suddenly Takes a Turn: Twenty Letters Between a Philosopher with Terminal Cancer and Medical Anthropologist) by Makiko Miyano and Maho Isono.

A co-production between France, Japan, Germany and Belgium, it stars Virginie Efira as Marie-Lou, the director of a nursing home in the Parisian suburbs who attempts to introduce a humane care technique known as Humanitude, in spite of resistance of her own crew. Her life is changed when she meets a terminally ill Japanese playwright Mari Morisaki (Tao Okamoto). The supporting cast includes Kyōzō Nagatsuka, Kodai Kurosaki, Jean-Charles Clichet, Marie Bunel, Romain Cottard, and Marie Denarnaud.

All of a Sudden had its world premiere in the main competition of the 79th Cannes Film Festival on 15 May 2026, where Efira and Okamoto shared the prize for Best Actress. It received widespread critical acclaim, with special praise for its direction, screenplay and acting. It was theatrically released in Japan by Bitters End on 19 June, and in France by Diaphana Distribution on 12 August.

It was selected as the Japanese entry for Best International Feature Film at the 99th Academy Awards.

== Plot ==
Marie-Lou Fontaine is the director of a for-profit nursing home for patients with dementia in the Parisian suburbs. Along with her administrative partner, Olivier, she attempts to train the staff in a humane caregiving technique named "Humanitude", which reminds patients of the presence of the caregiver and seeks to have them standing up and walking. She comes into frequent conflict with senior nurse Sophie, who worked at the home when it was formerly a mental hospital, who refuses to train herself in the technique due to the overworking of the nurses. When a nurse quits and Sophie threatens to quit over an altercation, Marie-Lou, unable to sleep and close to burnout, starts looking for answers.

One day, Marie-Lou leaves her workplace and comes across a developmentally disabled Japanese man running next to her tram. She follows him to a park, where she spends time with him and waits for his caregivers to come. The man is revealed to be Tomoki, the grandson of actor Gorō Kiyomiya, who comes to pick him up through GPS tracking along with the director of his play, Mari Morisaki. Mari hands Marie-Lou a pamphlet to her play.

Marie-Lou attends Mari and Gorō's play, where Gorō plays Italian psychiatrist Franco Basaglia, responsible for abolishing mental hospitals in Italy. Tomoki walks on stage and is incorporated into the performance. At the question and answer session after the play, Marie-Lou speaks in Japanese to Mari, to the chagrin of the French audience, about how the play resonated with her as a mental health professional. Mari reveals to her in her response that she is terminally ill and has been diagnosed with cancer. Mari and Marie-Lou meet after the session and walk to the banks of the Seine, chatting about their histories with Japan and France.

Marie-Lou invites Mari to stay with her at the nursing home, where she demonstrates Humanitude techniques to her. They discuss, from Mari's background as a philosopher, the way in which capitalism creates an "inside" and an "outside", where the "outside" is constantly expanding as its resources are consumed and the "inside" contracts.

Suddenly, Mari's health deteriorates, and she is forced to return to Kyoto, Japan. Marie-Lou follows with her, and they have heartfelt conversations at Mari's old house. At the doctor in Japan, it is revealed that Mari's cancer has returned and metastasized, and she has three months to live. Marie-Lou convinces Mari to return to Paris instead of entering hospice care in Japan.

Marie-Lou allows Mari to stay with her at the nursing home as an artist-in-residence as it is close to a large hospital. As Marie-Lou apologizes to Sophie and accepts staff requests to reduce Humanitude training sessions, Mari creates conceptual workshops for the patients using theatrical techniques. One day, shareholders arrive at the nursing home to see how the progress with Humanitude is going, seeing the patients walking and patients' families interacting with the nurses.

During a production of Mari's play at the home, Tomoki accidentally knocks over the screens that are providing French-language subtitles to the Japanese-language play. While Gorō decides to switch to French, Tomoki's actions cause a ripple effect wherein multiple patients spontaneously begin engaging in activities from Mari's workshops. Mari is overcome with emotion, and Marie-Lou hugs her. Mari expresses for the first time that she wants to live.

Some time later, Gorō and Tomoki return to Japan. On a mountain overlooking Mari's house where Marie-Lou and Mari spoke, they spread Mari's ashes into the wind. At the nursing home, Mari's workshops continue under the guidance of Marie-Lou, who is finally able to rest.

== Cast ==
- Virginie Efira as Marie-Lou Fontaine
- Tao Okamoto as Mari Morisaki
- Kyōzō Nagatsuka as Gorô Kiyomiya
- Kodai Kurosaki as Tomoki Kubodera
- Jean-Charles Clichet as Olivier Maritania
- Marie Bunel as Sophie Lefebvre
- Romain Cottard as Damien
- Marie Denarnaud as Laurence
- Gabriel Dahmani as Djibril Sami
- Séphora Pondi as Adidja
- Héloïse Janjaud as Vanessa
- Heidi Becker-Babel as Marion
- Lazare Gousseau as Claude
- Jérôme Chappatte as Philippe Murano
- Geneviève Emanuelli as Micheline

== Production ==
=== Development ===
In May 2025, it was announced that Ryusuke Hamaguchi would shoot his next film, All of a Sudden, in Paris with Virginie Efira and Tao Okamoto starring as its two female leads.

The film was loosely inspired by a collection of letters written between philosopher Makiko Miyano and medical anthropologist Maho Isono which were published in the book When Life Suddenly Takes a Turn: Twenty Letters Between a Philosopher with Terminal Cancer and Medical Anthropologist. The letters cover Miyano and Isono's thoughts on life, illness and death as Miyano fought metastatic breast cancer; Miyano lost consciousness shortly after writing the preface to the book and died after 15 days. Hamaguchi received several offers after the release of his film Drive My Car and only took notice of the project due to being "deeply moved" by the correspondence between the two women. He developed the project over two years, traveling to France in order to do so, including hosting a workshop with French actors to observe their work. In preparation for her role, Efira learned Japanese. As Hamaguchi had decided to transpose the setting to France, he contemplated how he could create a bridge between France and Japan, and settled on a treatment approach called Humanitude: "It's French method that was imported in Japan and is now practiced in several venues there, and puts the human dimension at the heart of the treatment care, for the integrity of each human being."

=== Filming ===
Principal photography began on 30 June 2025, with filming taking place in Paris and Kyoto and wrapping on 6 September 2025. Paris was the primary location of filming, with Hamaguchi wanting to show "a Paris that's a little different from the clichés we might have about the city", inspired by his time in "places that aren't touristy". Frenchman Alan Guichaoua served as director of photography.

=== Post-production ===
A co-production between France, Japan, Germany and Belgium, the film was produced by the Paris-based company Cinefrance Studios with the Japanese studios Office Shirous and Bitters End, Germany's Heimatfilm and Belgium's Tarantula. Hamaguchi first met producer David Gauquié of Cinefrance when the two sat at a café in Shibuya in 2022 and discussed French cinema. Hamaguchi considers French cinema an inspiration for him and central to his "vision as a filmmaker"; he also said that he has been "trying desperately to learn French".

Canadian-French composer Samuel Andreyev composed the film's original score.

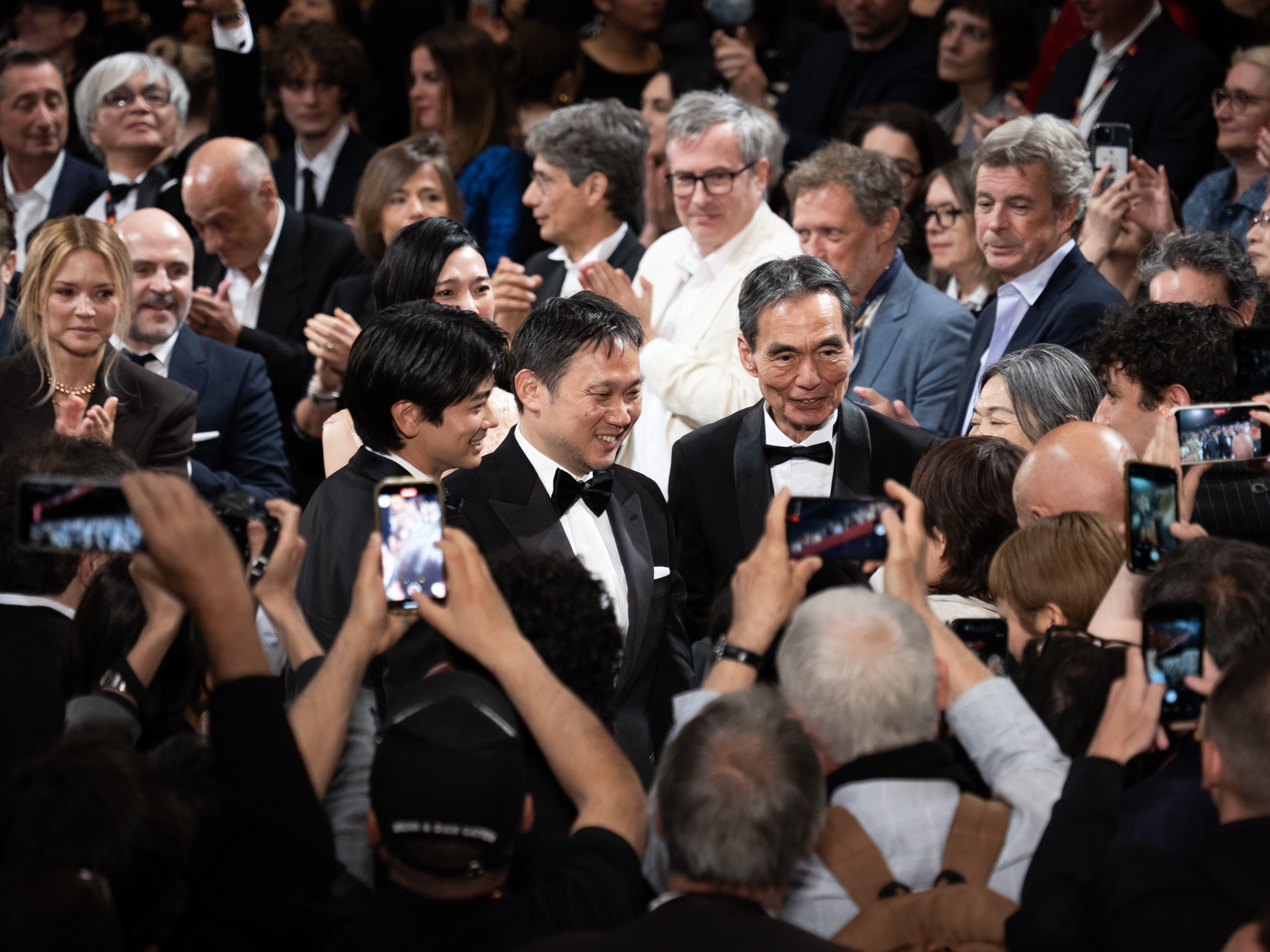
Japanese director Ryusuke Hamaguchi alongside actors Kyōzō Nagatsuka, Kodai Kurosaki and Virginie Efira during the standing ovation at the 2026 Cannes Film Festival

== Release ==
All of a Sudden was selected to compete for the Palme d'Or at the 2026 Cannes Film Festival, where it had its world premiere on 15 May, receiving a 7-minute standing ovation. It was theatrically released in Japan by Bitters End on 19 June 2026, and in France by Diaphana Distribution on 12 August.

It was screened in the Summer Screen Programme section of the 32nd Sarajevo Film Festival on 20 August 2026. It was also selected for the Main Slate of the 2026 New York Film Festival, and the 'Perlak' section of the 74th San Sebastián International Film Festival.

Cinefrance launched world sales at the European Film Market in Berlin alongside Bitters End, which handled sales in Asia. In February 2026, Neon acquired North American distribution rights to the film at the European Film Market; it will release the film on 25 November 2026 in the United States.

== Reception ==
=== Critical response ===
On the review aggregator website Rotten Tomatoes, 93% of 67 critics' reviews are positive, with an average rating of 8.5/10. The website's consensus reads: "Touching on subjects like dignity, mortality, and systemic inequality, All of a Sudden is as much a socratic dialogue as it is a film, with Virginie Efira and Tao Okamoto's wonderful turns ensuring the conversation always remains riveting." Metacritic, which uses a weighted average, assigned the film a score of 87 out of 100, based on 16 critics, indicating "universal acclaim".

Peter Bradshaw of The Guardian rated the film 3 out of 5 stars, observing that it "works best entirely outside the exotically overwritten, overthought bond between Mari and Marie-Lou". Stephanie Zacharek of Time praised how "the film is so beautifully lit that it's practically an act of wonder" otherwise also warning about the "slow-going" nature of the film and the "repetition of certain ideas and themes, much of it perhaps unnecessary". Jessica Kiang of Variety deemed All of a Sudden to be "the rarest type of film, not merely good enough to remind you what cinema can be, but great enough to remind you what life can be". Fabien Lemercier of Cineuropa wrote that Hamaguchi "crafts a multi-layered film of great purity, where benevolence stubbornly fights back against inevitability".

=== Accolades ===
Award	Date of ceremony	Category	Recipient(s)	Result	Ref.
Asia Pacific Screen Awards	30 October 2026	Best Film	All of a Sudden	Nominated	
Asia Pacific Screen Awards	30 October 2026	Best Director	Ryusuke Hamaguchi	Nominated	
Asia Pacific Screen Awards	30 October 2026	Best Performance	Virginie Efira and Tao Okamoto	Nominated	
British Independent Film Awards	6 December 2026	Best International Independent Film	Ryusuke Hamaguchi, Léa Le Dimna, David Gauquié, Julien Deris, Kôsuke Oshida, Yûji Sadai, Jean-Luc Ormières, Renan Artukmaç, and Hiroko Matsuda	Pending	
Cannes Film Festival	23 May 2026	Palme d'Or	Ryusuke Hamaguchi	Nominated	
Cannes Film Festival	23 May 2026	Best Actress	Virginie Efira and Tao Okamoto	Won	
Chicago International Film Festival	23 October 2026	Best Screenplay	Ryusuke Hamaguchi and Léa Le Dimna	Won	
Denver Film Festival	1 November 2026	Krzysztof Kieslowski Award for Best Feature Film	All of a Sudden	Nominated	
Gotham Independent Film Awards	30 November 2026	Best International Feature	Ryusuke Hamaguchi, Julien Deris, David Gauquié, Kosuke Oshida, and Yuji Sadai	Pending	
Gotham Independent Film Awards	30 November 2026	Best Director	Ryusuke Hamaguchi	Pending	
Gotham Independent Film Awards	30 November 2026	Best Adapted Screenplay	Ryusuke Hamaguchi	Pending	
Gotham Independent Film Awards	30 November 2026	Outstanding Supporting Performance	Tao Okamoto	Pending	
Hochi Film Awards	December 2026	Best Picture	All of a Sudden	Pending	
Hochi Film Awards	December 2026	Best Director	Ryusuke Hamaguchi	Pending	
Hochi Film Awards	December 2026	Best Actress	Tao Okamoto	Pending	
Mill Valley Film Festival	11 October 2026	Screen Artistry Award	Virginie Efira	Honored	
Montclair Film Festival	26 October 2026	Best of World Cinema	All of a Sudden	Won	
Nikkan Sports Film Awards	27 December 2026	Best Film	All of a Sudden	Pending	
Nikkan Sports Film Awards	27 December 2026	Best Director	Ryusuke Hamaguchi	Pending	
Nikkan Sports Film Awards	27 December 2026	Best Actress	Tao Okamoto	Pending	
Nikkan Sports Film Awards	27 December 2026	Best Supporting Actor	Kyozo Nagatsuka	Pending	
San Sebastián International Film Festival	26 September 2026	RTVE Another Look Award	Ryusuke Hamaguchi	Won	
Sydney Film Festival	14 June 2026	GIO Audience Award for Best International Feature	All of a Sudden	Runner-up	

== See also ==
- List of Japanese submissions for the Academy Award for Best International Feature Film
- List of submissions to the 99th Academy Awards for Best International Feature Film
