= Identifying Features =

- Film poster
- Spanish: Sin Señas Particulares
- Directed by: Fernanda Veladez
- Written by: Fernanda Valadez; Astrid Rondero
- Produced by: Astrid Rondero; Fernanda Valadez; Jack Zagha; Yossy Zagha
- Starring: Mercedes Hernández; David Illescas; Juan Jesús Varela; Ana Laura Rodríguez; Laura Elena Ibarra; Xicoténcatl Ulloa
- Cinematography: Claudia Becerril Bulos
- Edited by: Fernanda Valadez; Astrid Rondero; Susan Korda
- Music by: Clarice Jensen
- Production company: Corpulenta
- Release dates: January 2020 (Sundance); August 2021 (Mexico)
- Running time: 95 minutes
- Countries: Mexico; Spain
- Languages: Spanish; Zapotec

Identifying Features (Spanish: Sin Señas Particulares) is a 2020 Mexican-Spanish drama film directed by Fernanda Veladez who co-wrote with Astrid Rondero. It premiered at the Sundance Film Festival and won the Audience Award: World Cinema Dramatic and the World Cinema Dramatic Special Jury Award for Best Screenplay. It is about the many immigrants who often go missing or die on their journeys. Most of the main characters are mothers trying to find their children.

== Plot ==
Jesus, a teenager from an impoverished region in Guanajuato, is convinced by his friend Rigo to leave their rural town and try their luck crossing the border to the United States. His mother, Magdalena, is left alone in their hometown. After a few months, Magdalena, alongside Rigo's mother Chuya, go to the police, fearful that they haven't heard from their sons. The police show them pictures of recently murdered immigrants that have yet to be identified. Chuya recognizes Rigo as one of the victims, however Magdalena doesn't see Jesus in any of the pictures. Hopeful that Jesus might still be alive, and inspired by Chuya's words of encouragement during Rigo's funeral, Magdalena sets up north in search for her son.

She arrives at a government facility where the bodies of victims murdered by drug cartels and other criminal organizations are held. They take a sample of her blood to cross-check with the bodies they have in storage. Although none of the bodies match with her blood sample, she recognizes Jesus's bag-pack in one of the pictures of the victims' belongings. A government official tells her that may of the bodies recovered were badly burnt therefore they can't be recognized through the blood test, but using the bag-pack she identified as evidence he tries to convince her that her son is dead. He hands her documents for her to fill out as acknowledgment of her son's death.

Before she can sign them she meets Olivia, a woman who was also at the facility to see if she recognized her son, Diego, among the victims. Olivia tells her that Diego had been missing for four years and that, after a while, she had lost hope that he was still alive so she stopped searching for him. However, when recognizing the body, Olivia is told that her son had died a few weeks prior, meaning that he was still alive during most of the time he had disappeared. Olivia encourages Magdalena to keep looking for Jesus. Magdalena refuses to sign the papers and continues with her search.

At a migrant shelter she meets La Regis, a woman that tells her that a bus was stopped a few months back and that most of the passengers were assaulted and murdered. One of the only survivors is an old man named Alberto Mateo, who stayed at the shelter after the attack. Wanting to hear the story from Alberto himself, Magdalena asks La Regis where she can find him. She tells her that Alberto lives in a rural community near Ocampo, a small town right next to the U.S. border. Magdalena heads to Ocampo.

Magdalena arrives to find Ocampo has been taken over by armed drug dealers and most of its inhabitants have either fled or been murdered. At Ocampo she meets Miguel, a teenage boy that had been working in the United States the past few years but who was recently deported back to Mexico. Miguel returned to Ocampo, his hometown, to look for his mom. He finds their old house but no traces of her. Magdalena tries to encourage Miguel, telling him that he reminds her of her own son. They visit Miguel's god-father, however he tells them that the town has been completely ransacked and that "there's no one left and he should leave". Defeated by the idea that his mom might be dead, Miguel is unable to accompany Magdalena in her search. She continues alone and is taken by a canoe to a small community where Alberto lives.

Alberto narrates the events the night the bus was attacked. All of the passengers were taken to a bonfire on a field where "the devil" killed them all, including Rigo and her son Jesus. Only Alberto was spared. Though devastated, she returns that night to Ocampo where she tries to convince Miguel to leave with her. Before he can decide, a truck filled with armed men pulls up to the house. Magdalena and Miguel try to escape through the field behind the house but Miguel is found and shot dead. Magdalena is also found but before being shot she realizes the armed man is her son, Jesus. Jesus recognizes her and tells her that, at the bonfire after the assault on the bus, he was forced to kill Rigo with a machete. He tells her that "they caught him and now he can't leave". He asks her to lay low while he and the other armed men leave.

The next day, a distraught Magdalena takes Miguel's body to the authorities. The final shot shows a devil-like figure emerging from a bonfire.

== Reception ==
It has a 99% approval rating on Rotten Tomatoes, based on 72 reviews, with an average rating of 8.2/10. The website's critics consensus reads: "A slow-burning descent into desperation, Identifying Features uses one shattered family's ordeal to offer a harrowing look at the immigrant experience." According to Metacritic, which sampled 15 critics and calculated a weighted average score of 85 out of 100, the film received "universal acclaim".

=== Accolades ===
Award	Category	Nominee(s)	Result	Ref.
63rd Ariel Awards	Best Picture	Corpulenta Producciones, FOPROCINE, Avanti Pictures, EnAguas Cine, Nephilim Producciones. Dir. Fernanda Valadez	Won	
63rd Ariel Awards	Best Director	Fernanda Valadez	Won	
63rd Ariel Awards	Best Actress	Mercedes Hernández	Won	
63rd Ariel Awards	Best Supporting Actor	David Illescas	Won	
63rd Ariel Awards	Best Breakthrough Performance	Ana Laura Rodríguez	Nominated	
63rd Ariel Awards	Best Breakthrough Performance	Juan Jesús Varela	Nominated	
63rd Ariel Awards	Best Original Screenplay	Fernanda Valadez, Astrid Rondero	Won	
63rd Ariel Awards	Best Sound	Omar Juárez, Milton Aceves, Alejandro Mayorquín, Misael Hernández "Topillo"	Nominated	
63rd Ariel Awards	Best Original Score	Clarice Jensen	Nominated	
63rd Ariel Awards	Best Makeup	Neftalí Zamora, Tanía Larizza	Nominated	
63rd Ariel Awards	Best Art Design	Dalia Reyes	Nominated	
63rd Ariel Awards	Best Visual Effects	Darío Basile, Curro Muñoz, Lara Gómez del Pulgar, Mario Lucero Recio, Carlos Claramunt Terol, Jaime Rafael Fuente, Pablo Lamosa Barros, Ricardo G. Elipe, Antonio Ramos Ramos	Won	
63rd Ariel Awards	Best Special Effects	José Ángel Cordero, Mahonrri Laurencio Cordero Ortiz, José Martínez «Josh» (Note: When the nominees were announced on August 18 2021, the information only mentioned the names of José Ángel Cordero and José Martínez «Josh». On September 25 2021, the name of Mahonrri Laurencio Cordero Ortiz was already included during the ceremony transmission. The causes of this incident are unknown.)	Nominated	
63rd Ariel Awards	Best Editing	Fernanda Valadez, Astrid Rondero, Susan Korda	Won	
63rd Ariel Awards	Best Cinematography	Claudia Becerril Bulos	Won	
63rd Ariel Awards	Best First Feature	Fernanda Valadez	Won	
Sundance Film Festival	Grand Jury Prize for the World Cinema Dramatic Competition	Identifying Features	Nominated	
Sundance Film Festival	World Cinema Dramatic Audience Award	Identifying Features	Won	
Sundance Film Festival	World Cinema Dramatic Special Jury Award for Best Screenplay	Astrid Rondero and Fernanda Valadez for Identifying Features	Won	
Gotham Awards	Best International Feature	Identifying Features	Won	
68th San Sebastián International Film Festival	Horizontes Award	Identifying Features	Won	
68th San Sebastián International Film Festival	Spanish Cooperation Award	Identifying Features	Won	
Zurich Film Festival	Golden Eye	Identifying Features	Won	
Thessaloniki International Film Festival	Golden Alexander	Identifying Features	Won	
Morelia International Film Festival	OJO for Mexican Feature Film	Identifying Features	Won	
Morelia International Film Festival	Audience Award for Mexican Feature Film	Identifying Features	Won	
Morelia International Film Festival	Award for Best Actress in a Mexican Feature Film	Mercedes Hernández	Won	
