= Toronto Film Critics Association Award for Best First Feature =

Canadian film award

The Toronto Film Critics Association Award for Best First Feature is one of the annual awards given by the Toronto Film Critics Association.

== Winners ==
=== 2000s ===
| Year | Winner | Director(s) | Ref |
|---|---|---|---|
| 2001 | Sexy Beast | Jonathan Glazer | |
| 2001 | Amores perros | Alejandro González Iñárritu | |
| 2001 | In the Bedroom | Todd Field | |
| 2002 | Atanarjuat: The Fast Runner | Zacharias Kunuk | |
| 2002 | Confessions of a Dangerous Mind | George Clooney | |
| 2002 | Igby Goes Down | Burr Steers | |
| 2003 | American Splendor | Shari Springer Berman, Robert Pulcini | |
| 2004 | Maria Full of Grace | Joshua Marston | |
| 2005 | Capote | Bennett Miller | |
| 2006 | Thank You for Smoking | Jason Reitman | |
| 2006 | Brick | Rian Johnson | |
| 2006 | Little Miss Sunshine | Jonathan Dayton, Valerie Faris | |
| 2007 | Away from Her | Sarah Polley | |
| 2007 | Gone Baby Gone | Ben Affleck | |
| 2007 | Michael Clayton | Tony Gilroy | |
| 2008 | Ballast | Lance Hammer | |
| 2008 | The Band's Visit | Eran Kolirin | |
| 2008 | Frozen River | Courtney Hunt | |
| 2009 | Hunger | Steve McQueen | |
| 2009 | 500 Days of Summer | Marc Webb | |
| 2009 | District 9 | Neill Blomkamp | |

=== 2010s ===
| Year | Winner | Director(s) | Ref |
|---|---|---|---|
| 2010 | Exit Through the Gift Shop | Banksy | |
| 2010 | Get Low | Aaron Schneider | |
| 2010 | Monsters | Gareth Edwards | |
| 2011 | Attack the Block | Joe Cornish | |
| 2011 | Margin Call | J. C. Chandor | |
| 2011 | Martha Marcy May Marlene | Sean Durkin | |
| 2012 | Beasts of the Southern Wild | Benh Zeitlin | |
| 2012 | Beyond the Black Rainbow | Panos Cosmatos | |
| 2012 | The Cabin in the Woods | Drew Goddard | |
| 2013 | Neighboring Sounds | Kleber Mendonça Filho | |
| 2013 | Fruitvale Station | Ryan Coogler | |
| 2013 | In a World... | Lake Bell | |
| 2014 | The Lunchbox | Ritesh Batra | |
| 2014 | John Wick | Chad Stahelski | |
| 2014 | Nightcrawler | Dan Gilroy | |
| 2015 | Ex Machina | Alex Garland | |
| 2015 | Sleeping Giant | Andrew Cividino | |
| 2015 | Son of Saul | László Nemes | |
| 2016 | The Witch | Robert Eggers | |
| 2016 | The Edge of Seventeen | Kelly Fremon Craig | |
| 2016 | Swiss Army Man | Daniel Scheinert, Daniel Kwan | |
| 2017 | Get Out | Jordan Peele | |
| 2017 | Lady Macbeth | William Oldroyd | |
| 2017 | Werewolf | Ashley McKenzie | |
| 2018 | Sorry to Bother You | Boots Riley | |
| 2018 | Eighth Grade | Bo Burnham | |
| 2018 | Hereditary | Ari Aster | |
| 2019 | Booksmart | Olivia Wilde | |
| 2019 | Atlantics | Mati Diop | |
| 2019 | Queen & Slim | Melina Matsoukas | |

=== 2020s ===
| Year | Winner | Director(s) | Ref |
|---|---|---|---|
| 2020 | The Forty-Year-Old Version | Radha Blank | |
| 2020 | The Father | Florian Zeller | |
| 2020 | Promising Young Woman | Emerald Fennell | |
| 2021 | The Lost Daughter | Maggie Gyllenhall | |
| 2021 | Passing | Rebecca Hall | |
| 2021 | Pig | Michael Sarnoski | |
| 2021 | Shiva Baby | Emma Seligman | |
| 2022 | Aftersun | Charlotte Wells | |
| 2022 | Marcel the Shell with Shoes On | Dean Fleischer Camp | |
| 2022 | Turning Red | Domee Shi | |
| 2023 | Rye Lane | Raine Allen-Miller | |
| 2023 | American Fiction | Cord Jefferson | |
| 2023 | Past Lives | Celine Song | |
| 2024 | Woman of the Hour | Anna Kendrick | |
| 2024 | 40 Acres | R. T. Thorne | |
| 2024 | Janet Planet | Annie Baker | |
| 2024 | The People's Joker | Vera Drew | |
| 2025 | Blue Heron | Sophy Romvari | |
| 2025 | Eephus | Carson Lund | |
| 2025 | Sorry, Baby | Eva Victor | |
