= Gotham Independent Film Award for Best Original Screenplay =

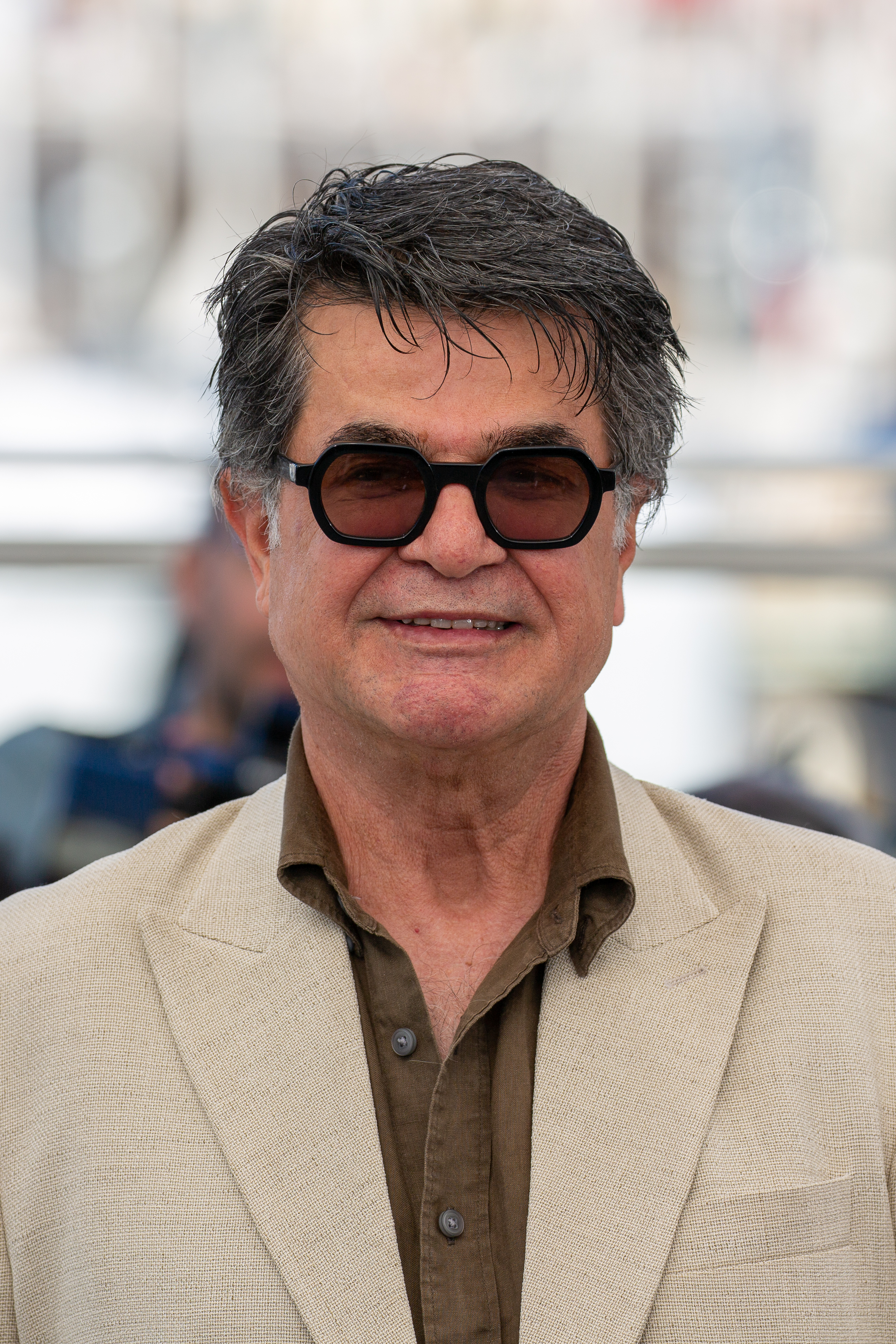
- 2025 recipient: Jafar Panahi
- Country: United States
- Presented by: The Gotham Film & Media Institute
- First award: 2025
- Currently held by: Jafar Panahi for It Was Just an Accident
- Website: awards.thegotham.org

The Gotham Independent Film Award for Best Original Screenplay, first awarded in 2025 as part of the Gotham Independent Film Awards, is an annual award for independent films. It replaced the Gotham Independent Film Award for Best Screenplay category.

Iranian filmmaker Jafar Panahi was the category's first winner for the thriller film It Was Just an Accident.

== Winners and nominees ==
=== 2020s ===
| Year | Screenwriter(s) | Film | Ref. |
|---|---|---|---|
| 2025 | Jafar Panahi | It Was Just an Accident | |
| 2025 | Mary Bronstein | If I Had Legs I’d Kick You | |
| 2025 | Kleber Mendonça Filho | The Secret Agent | |
| 2025 | Eva Victor | Sorry, Baby | |
| 2025 | Louise Peter & Mascha Schilinski | Sound of Falling | |
| 2026 | Sandra Wollner | Everytime | |
| 2026 | Marine Atlan & Anne Brouillet | La Gradiva | |
| 2026 | Lee Chang-dong & Oh Jung-mi | Possible Love | |
| 2026 | Mike Leigh | Tender Loving Care | |
| 2026 | Martin McDonagh | Wild Horse Nine | |

== See also ==
- Academy Award for Best Original Screenplay
- BAFTA Award for Best Original Screenplay
- Critics' Choice Movie Award for Best Screenplay
- Golden Globe Award for Best Screenplay
- Independent Spirit Award for Best Screenplay
- Writers Guild of America Award for Best Original Screenplay
