= Tender Loving Care (2026 film) =

2026 British film by Mike Leigh

- Theatrical release poster
- Directed by: Mike Leigh
- Written by: Mike Leigh
- Produced by: Georgina Lowe
- Starring: Marion Bailey; Paul Jesson; Kate O'Flynn; Alice Bailey Johnson; Tilly Vosburgh
- Cinematography: Lucy Bristow
- Edited by: Tania Reddin
- Production companies: Creativity Media; DesMar Productions; Film4; Merino Films; Thin Man Films; Ventureland
- Distributed by: StudioCanal
- Release dates: 4 September 2026 (Telluride); 12 February 2027 (United Kingdom)
- Running time: 108 minutes
- Country: United Kingdom
- Language: English

Tender Loving Care is a 2026 British comedy-drama film written and directed by Mike Leigh. The film stars Kate O'Flynn, Marion Bailey, Paul Jesson, and Alice Bailey Johnson.

Tender Loving Care had its world premiere at the 53rd Telluride Film Festival on 4 September 2026, and is scheduled to be released in the United Kingdom by StudioCanal on 12 February 2027. The film received widespread praise from critics.

== Cast ==
- Kate O'Flynn as Amy
- Marion Bailey as Birdie
- Paul Jesson as Geoff
- Alice Bailey Johnson as Rosie
- Bríd Brennan
- Peter Wight
- Alan Williams
- Sandy Foster
- Amanda Lawrence
- Diveen Henry
- Ashna Rabheru
- Eva Holovko
- Kaedon Skerritt
- Tilly Vosburgh

== Production ==
In February 2026, it was reported that Leigh had concluded shooting his next film, along with the announcement of the core cast. Leigh stated that Tender Loving Care was "most likely" his last film, given the physical challenges caused by illness.

== Release ==
The film had its world premiere at the 53rd Telluride Film Festival on 4 September 2026. It was also screened in Special Presentations section of the 2026 Toronto International Film Festival. It entered the main competition of the 74th San Sebastián International Film Festival, where it won three jury prizes (the Golden Shell for Best Film, the Jury Prize for Best Screenplay, and the Silver Shell for Best Leading Performance for Kate O'Flynn). It was also selected for the Main Slate of the 2026 New York Film Festival and in a headline gala of the 70th BFI London Film Festival.

It is scheduled to be theatrically released in the United States by Bleecker Street on 4 December 2026.

== Reception ==
=== Critical response ===
On review aggregator Rotten Tomatoes, the film holds an approval rating of 100% based on 49 reviews, with an average rating of 8.6/10. The website's critical consensus states: "A fabulously well-acted tribute to friendship and the bitter realities of aging, Mike Leigh's purported swan song is a characteristically elegant and wise parting gift from a master filmmaker". On Metacritic, the film has a weighted average score of 85 out of 100, based on 16 critics, indicating "universal acclaim".

Peter Bradshaw of The Guardian gave Tender Loving Care five stars, wrote "Mike's Leigh's new film - perhaps his last - is a poignant, intergenerational drama of happy-sad acceptance that life goes on, until it doesn't go on". Owen Gleiberman of Variety gave it a generally positive review, writing that the film was "an intermittently compelling, mildly affecting, in the end slightly scattershot movie".

=== Accolades ===
Award	Date of ceremony	Category	Recipient(s)	Result	Ref.
San Sebastián International Film Festival	26 September 2026	Golden Shell	Tender Loving Care	Won	
San Sebastián International Film Festival	26 September 2026	Silver Shell for Best Leading Performance	Kate O'Flynn	Won	
San Sebastián International Film Festival	26 September 2026	Jury Prize for Best Screenplay	Mike Leigh	Won	
San Sebastián International Film Festival	26 September 2026	SIGNIS Award	Tender Loving Care	Won	
Gotham Independent Film Awards	30 November 2026	Best International Feature	Mike Leigh, Georgina Lowe	Pending	
Gotham Independent Film Awards	30 November 2026	Best Director	Mike Leigh	Pending	
Gotham Independent Film Awards	30 November 2026	Best Original Screenplay	Mike Leigh	Pending	
Gotham Independent Film Awards	30 November 2026	Outstanding Supporting Performance	Kate O'Flynn	Pending	
British Independent Film Awards	6 December 2026	Best British Independent Film	Mike Leigh, Georgina Lowe	Pending	
British Independent Film Awards	6 December 2026	Best Director	Mike Leigh	Pending	
British Independent Film Awards	6 December 2026	Best Ensemble Performance	Marion Bailey, Paul Jesson, Kate O'Flynn, Alice Bailey Johnson	Pending	
British Independent Film Awards	6 December 2026	Best Screenplay	Mike Leigh	Pending	
