= Possible Love =

2026 film by Lee Chang-dong

- Release poster
- Hangul: 가능한 사랑
- RR: Ganeunghan sarang
- MR: Kanŭnghan sarang
- Directed by: Lee Chang-dong
- Written by: Lee Chang-dong; Oh Jung-mi
- Produced by: Lee Joon-dong; David Levine; Chadwick Prichard
- Starring: Jeon Do-yeon; Sul Kyung-gu; Zo In-sung; Cho Yeo-jeong
- Cinematography: Kim Ji-yong
- Edited by: Kim Da-won
- Music by: Jung Jae-il
- Production companies: Pinehouse Film; Anonymous Content; Nowfilm
- Distributed by: Netflix; Next Entertainment World (Limited cinema release)
- Release dates: September 6, 2026 (Venice); September 23, 2026 (South Korea); October 23, 2026 (United States); November 6, 2026 (Netflix)
- Running time: 164 minutes
- Countries: South Korea; United States
- Language: Korean

Possible Love (Korean: 가능한 사랑) is a 2026 drama film directed by Lee Chang-dong, from a screenplay he co-wrote with Oh Jung-mi. A co-production of South Korea and the United States, starring Jeon Do-yeon, Sul Kyung-gu, Zo In-sung, and Cho Yeo-jeong, it follows the story of two married couples — a laid-off worker and his spouse, and a documentary filmmaker and her spouse — crossing paths to film a documentary and facing their different lives and hidden desires.

Possible Love premiered in the main competition of the 83rd Venice International Film Festival on September 6, 2026, where it won the Grand Jury Prize and the FIPRESCI Prize. It was theatrically released in South Korea on September 23, followed by the United States on October 23, and a worldwide release by Netflix on November 6.

It was also selected as the South Korean entry for the Best International Feature Film category for the 99th Academy Awards.

== Plot ==
The automaker firm SP Heavy Industries, which runs a plant where respected welder Choi Ho-seok works, announces massive layoffs. The metalworkers' union rejects the cuts and barricades themselves on the factory roofs; the strike is broken when police commandos execute a brutal helicopter raid on the roofs, leading to the deaths of several of Ho-seok's friends. In the aftermath, Ho-seok and his fellow survivors are fired, and begin bitterly referring to themselves as "the dead" and to those who kept their jobs as "the living".

Two years later, Ho-seok reluctantly attends a funeral for another of his co-workers who died by suicide. Ho-seok's wife, Ahn Mi-ok, a mask factory worker, and ten-year-old son Cheol also attend, alongside ambitious documentarian Lee Ye-ji and her wealthy husband Sang-woo. When Mi-ok confronts Ho-seok over his drinking, he notices Ye-ji training a camera on their argument. Infuriated by her intrusion, Ho-seok shouts at her. Embarrassed, Mi-ok steps outside and accidentally drops her loose wedding ring; Sang-woo helps her recover it. Observing the tensions between the couple, Ye-ji decides to make Ho-seok and Mi-ok the primary subjects of her next documentary.

Ye-ji meets Mi-ok at an upscale café, hoping to entice Ho-seok to agree to the film. During their conversation, Mi-ok shares a childhood memory of playing with a hose at her mother's manual car wash job to catch a glimpse of a rainbow, only for her mother to angrily snatch the hose away out of fear Mi-ok would end up in such a lowly position. Seeing the power of the story, Ye-ji asks Mi-ok to retell the story on camera. Seeking to overcome Ho-seok's reluctance, Ye-ji invites him, Mi-ok and Cheol for a weekend getaway at Sang-woo’s lavish estate on the west coast of Korea, where they are treated luxuriously.

Ho-seok finally agrees to sit for an interview, but demands that Mi-ok leave the room. On camera, he suffers a panic attack as he vents his bottled-up rage at his former coworkers, who had left him to be badly beaten after he tried to save them. He angrily denounces the slogans his union chanted, including "solidarity, struggle, and workers' rights", as "all bullshit". As the interview continues, Mi-ok and Sang-woo walk along the beach and partake in flirtatious conversation. Meanwhile, Cheol wanders into the groundskeeper's shed and watches the four adults through the house's closed-circuit television cameras, observing in silence. Cheol befriends the groundskeeper and Mi-ok later witnesses the two hosing down a bush. One night at dinner, Mi-ok and Ye-ji both share memories from their youth of staring at the full moon in the night's sky.

Mi-ok's trust in Ye-ji fades after she surreptitiously follows Ho-seok out of the house into the forest to find him screaming and writhing on the ground, only to turn around and discover Ye-ji had followed her with a camera. Mi-ok and Sang-woo's flirtations culminate with the two skinny-dipping on the beach, though she ultimately rejects his repeated advances. The two return to the estate to find Ye-ji conducting another emotionally charged interview with Ho-seok, at which point Mi-ok demands that filming cease and tells her husband that their family must leave.

As they drive home, news breaks that SP Heavy Industries has been acquired by an American private equity firm, limiting Ho-seok's hopes of ever regaining his job. When Mi-ok and Ho-seok arrive at their house, Mi-ok discovers that Ye-ji has texted her asking if they safely arrived home. She considers replying with a picture of the full moon in the sky but ultimately leaves it unsent.

== Cast ==
- Jeon Do-yeon as Ahn Mi-ok
  - Jo Yu-ri as young Mi-ok
- Sul Kyung-gu as Choi Ho-seok
  - Choi Min as young Ho-seok
- Zo In-sung as Han Sang-woo
- Cho Yeo-jeong as Lee Ye-ji
- Jeong Seop as Choi Cheol

== Production ==
A co-production by South Korea and United States, the film is produced by Pinehouse Film, Anonymous Content and NOWFILM.

The film was originally part of Maciej Musiał's project to remake all ten episodes of Krzysztof Kieślowski's Dekalog as feature films, alongside Asghar Farhadi's Parallel Tales. According to Lee, once Netflix joined the project, the "project fell into an ambiguous state. Although this film originated from there, it does not adapt an episode of Dekalog and is a completely different story. However, it is related to one of the commandments." Lee's first draft of what became Possible Love had been written over a decade prior. Upon reading the finished script, Netflix immediately signed on and "guaranteed [Lee] artistic autonomy."

Jung Jae-il was hired to compose the score.

== Release ==
The film had its world premiere in the main competition of the 83rd Venice International Film Festival on September 6, 2026, where it won the FIPRESCI Prize. It also screened at the 2026 Toronto International Film Festival, and in the Main Slate of the 2026 New York Film Festival.

Possible Love was released first in South Korean cinemas through Next Entertainment World on September 23; followed by select U.S. theaters on October 23, and released worldwide by Netflix on November 6.

Possible Love had its Dutch premiere on October 10 at the Leiden International Film Festival, making it the only theatrical screening in the Benelux.

It was also selected as the South Korean entry for the Best International Feature Film category for the 99th Academy Awards, marking director Lee's fourth film selected, following Oasis (2002), Secret Sunshine (2007), and Burning (2018).

== Reception ==
=== Critical response ===
On the review aggregator website Rotten Tomatoes, 97% of 116 critics' reviews are positive, with an average rating of 8.6/10. The website's critical consensus states: "A perfectly poised drama that's seething with the chaos of modernity beneath its polished surface, Possible Love is a masterful exploration of fidelity and inequality from director Lee Chang-dong". Metacritic, which uses a weighted average, assigned the film a score of 95 out of 100, based on 33 critics, indicating "universal acclaim".

Peter Bradshaw of The Guardian rated the film 4 out of 5 stars, describing it as "a finely judged, beautifully acted and rather novelistic work". Jessica Kiang, in a review for Variety, praised Possible Love, calling it a "shimmering, sonorous work, from one of our greatest living directors." Brian Tallerico of RogerEbert.com gave the film 4 out of 4 stars, writing, "Possible Love is as dense as our best literature, filled with rich character beats that feel of a piece with what came before and where these characters are going next... You won't forget it."

=== Accolades ===
| Award | Date of ceremony | Category | Recipient(s) | Result | Ref. |
|---|---|---|---|---|---|
| Venice Film Festival | September 12, 2026 | Golden Lion | Lee Chang-dong | Nominated | |
| Venice Film Festival | September 12, 2026 | Grand Jury Prize | Lee Chang-dong | Won | |
| Venice Film Festival | September 12, 2026 | FIPRESCI Prize | Lee Chang-dong | Won | |
| Venice Film Festival | September 12, 2026 | ARCA CinemaGiovani Award for Best Film of Venezia 83 | Lee Chang-dong | Won | |
| TIFF Tribute Awards | September 13, 2026 | Ebert Director Award | Lee Chang-dong | Honored | |
| Toronto International Film Festival | September 20, 2026 | International People's Choice Award | Possible Love | Runner-up | |
| Mill Valley Film Festival | October 3, 2026 | Auteur Award | Lee Chang-dong | Honored | |
| Marie Claire Asia Star Awards | October 7, 2026 | Actor of the Year Award | Zo In-sung | Won | |
| Montclair Film Festival | October 18, 2026 | Fiction Feature Competition | Possible Love | Won | |
| Korean Association of Film Critics Awards | November 4, 2026 | Top 10 Films of the Year | Possible Love | Won | |
| Korean Association of Film Critics Awards | November 4, 2026 | Best Film | Possible Love | Won | |
| Korean Association of Film Critics Awards | November 4, 2026 | Best Actress | Jeon Do-yeon | Won | |
| Blue Dragon Film Awards | November 25, 2026 | Best Actress | Jeon Do-yeon | Pending | |
| Blue Dragon Film Awards | November 25, 2026 | Best Actor | Sul Kyung-gu | Pending | |
| Blue Dragon Film Awards | November 25, 2026 | Best Supporting Actor | Zo In-sung | Pending | |
| Blue Dragon Film Awards | November 25, 2026 | Best Supporting Actress | Cho Yeo-jeong | Pending | |
| Blue Dragon Film Awards | November 25, 2026 | Best Screenplay | Lee Chang-dong, Oh Jung-mi | Pending | |
| Blue Dragon Film Awards | November 25, 2026 | Best Editing | Kim Da-won | Pending | |
| Blue Dragon Film Awards | November 25, 2026 | Best Cinematography and Lighting | Kim Ji-yong, Jo Gwon-su | Pending | |
| Blue Dragon Film Awards | November 25, 2026 | Best Music | Jung Jae-il | Pending | |
| Gotham Independent Film Awards | November 30, 2026 | Best International Feature | Lee Chang-dong, Lee Joon-dong, David Levine, Chadwick Prichard | Pending | |
| Gotham Independent Film Awards | November 30, 2026 | Best Original Screenplay | Lee Chang-dong and Oh Jung-mi | Pending | |
| Gotham Independent Film Awards | November 30, 2026 | Outstanding Lead Performance | Jeon Do-yeon | Pending | |
| British Independent Film Awards | December 6, 2026 | Best International Independent Film | Lee Chang-dong, Oh Jung-mi | Pending | |

== See also ==
- List of submissions to the 99th Academy Awards for Best International Feature Film
- List of South Korean submissions for the Academy Award for Best International Feature Film
