= Still Processing (film) =

2020 Canadian film

- Film poster
- Directed by: Sophy Romvari
- Written by: Sophy Romvari
- Produced by: Sophy Romvari
- Cinematography: Devan Scott
- Edited by: Kalil Haddad; Sophy Romvari; Will Ross
- Music by: Benjamin Romvari
- Release date: September 11, 2020 (TIFF)
- Running time: 14 minutes
- Country: Canada

Still Processing is a 2020 Canadian short documentary film, directed by Sophy Romvari.

Made as her thesis project while she was pursuing her MFA in film at York University, the film explores her family's unresolved grief over the deaths of her two older brothers through the process of digitizing a box of old films, photographs and undeveloped photographic negatives of them throughout their lives.

The film premiered at the 2020 Toronto International Film Festival, and was then screened at numerous film festivals around the world. The film was later released on streaming services such as Mubi and The Criterion Channel.

== Background ==
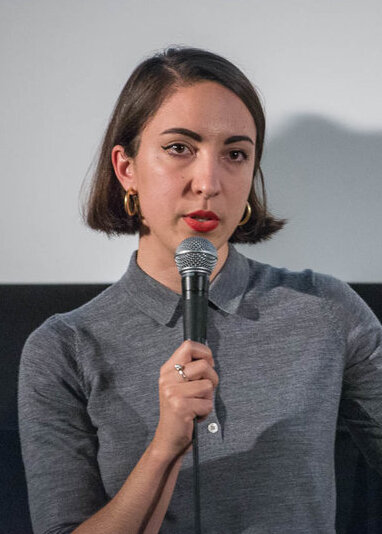
Romvari created the film as the thesis for her MFA at York University

The film focuses primarily on scenes of the filmmaker, Sophy Romvari, discovering never-before-seen photographs of her deceased brothers, which were taken and hidden by her father after their deaths. The film does not explicitly state how her brothers died, but explores the filmmaker's and her family's feelings of grief in the aftermath.

Made as her thesis project while she was pursuing her MFA in film at York University, the film explores her family's unresolved grief over the deaths of her two older brothers through the process of digitizing a box of old films, photographs and undeveloped photographic negatives of them throughout their lives.

== Release ==
After screening on the film festival circuit, Still Processing was released on the streaming service Mubi in 2021, and subsequently on The Criterion Collection's streaming platform in 2022 as part of a collection focusing on Romvari's short film work.

== Critical response ==
The film was positively reviewed by critics. Adam Nayman of Cinema Scope wrote that "Romvari’s instinct (and ability) to compose beautiful frames as containers around her ideas is of a piece with her previous work, but in Still Processing, the recessive, strategically mediated melancholy of the earlier shorts has been replaced with (or perhaps given way to) a more untrammelled emotional affect," while Alina Faulds of Flipscreen wrote that "Sophy Romvari shows brave filmmaking with her willingness to document her grief on screen. She holds nothing back, telling the viewers about the love she has for her lost brothers and even going so far as to capture one of her panic attacks. Still Processing is a tender portrait of empathy; Romvari grieves and forces the audience to grieve along with her. As she visits each photograph and memory she is giving herself permission to heal. Vulnerability is one of the greatest strengths an artist can have and with a film like Still Processing, vulnerability is necessary."

The film is also notable for going viral online through the film-focused social media website Letterboxd.

== Awards ==
Still Processing won awards on the film festival circuit, including the Audience Choice Award for Best Documentary Short at Indie Memphis and the Innovative Voice Award at the Diversions Film Festival in Croatia. The film also received a Canadian Screen Award nomination for Best Short Documentary at the 10th Canadian Screen Awards in 2022.
