= Astrid Rondero =

Mexican film director and producer

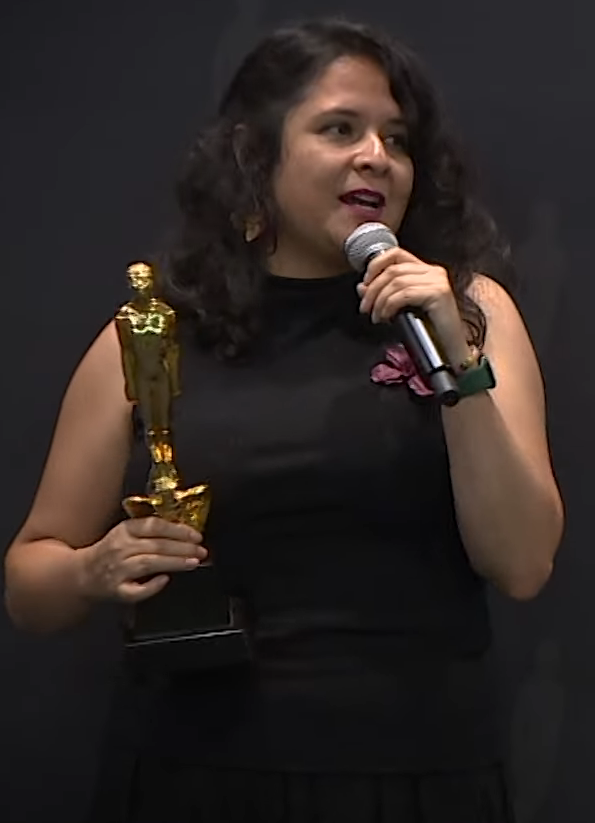
- Known for: Directing films
- Notable work: Sujo (2024)

Astrid Rondero is a Mexican film director, producer and screenwriter. Along with Fernanda Valadez, she is known for co-writing, co-directing, and co-producing films that explore social issues in Mexico.

== Work ==
Rondero and co-writer/director Valadez initially conceived the story of Identifying Features (2020) around 2012.

Rondero's collaboration with Valadez began with short films such as Of This World (2010), In Still Waters (2011) and 400 Bags (2014). Their feature film debut, The Darkest Days of Us (2017), which Rondero directed solo, won two Ariel Awards in Mexico for Best Actress and Best Debut Film.

Their subsequent films got critical acclaim at the 2024 Sundance Film Festival. Identifying Features (2020) won the World Cinema Dramatic Audience Award and the Special Jury Award for Best Screenplay. Their most recent film, Sujo (2024), premiered at Sundance and explores the consequences of cartel violence on the children left behind.

== Filmography ==
As director
Year	Title	Notes
2006	Julieta	Short film
2011	En Aguas Quietas	Short film
2017	The Darkest Days of Us	Two Ariel Awards
2024	Sujo	World Cinema Dramatic Grand Jury Award at 2024 Sundance Film Festival

== Awards and recognition ==
- Sujo - World Cinema Dramatic Grand Jury Award at 2024 Sundance Film Festival
