= Ryan Bobkin =

Canadian film producer

Ryan Bobkin is a Canadian film producer based in Toronto, Ontario. He is most noted as a producer of the 2025 film Blue Heron, which was a Canadian Screen Award nominee for Best Picture at the 14th Canadian Screen Awards in 2026.

Bobkin was nominated for Best International Feature at the 2026 Gotham Film Awards as one of the producers of Blue Heron.

He began his career as a child actor, with small parts in the television series Life with Boys and the film Stage Fright. His early credits as an associate producer included the films Stanleyville, Quickening, Infinity Pool and Shook.
