= Sara Wylie =

Canadian film producer

Sara Wylie is a Canadian film producer based in Vancouver, British Columbia. She is most noted as a producer of the 2025 film Blue Heron, which was a Canadian Screen Award nominee for Best Picture at the 14th Canadian Screen Awards in 2026. Wylie was nominated for Best International Feature at the 2026 Gotham Film Awards as one of the producers of Blue Heron.
