= Lycée Jacques Prévert (Boulogne-Billancourt) =

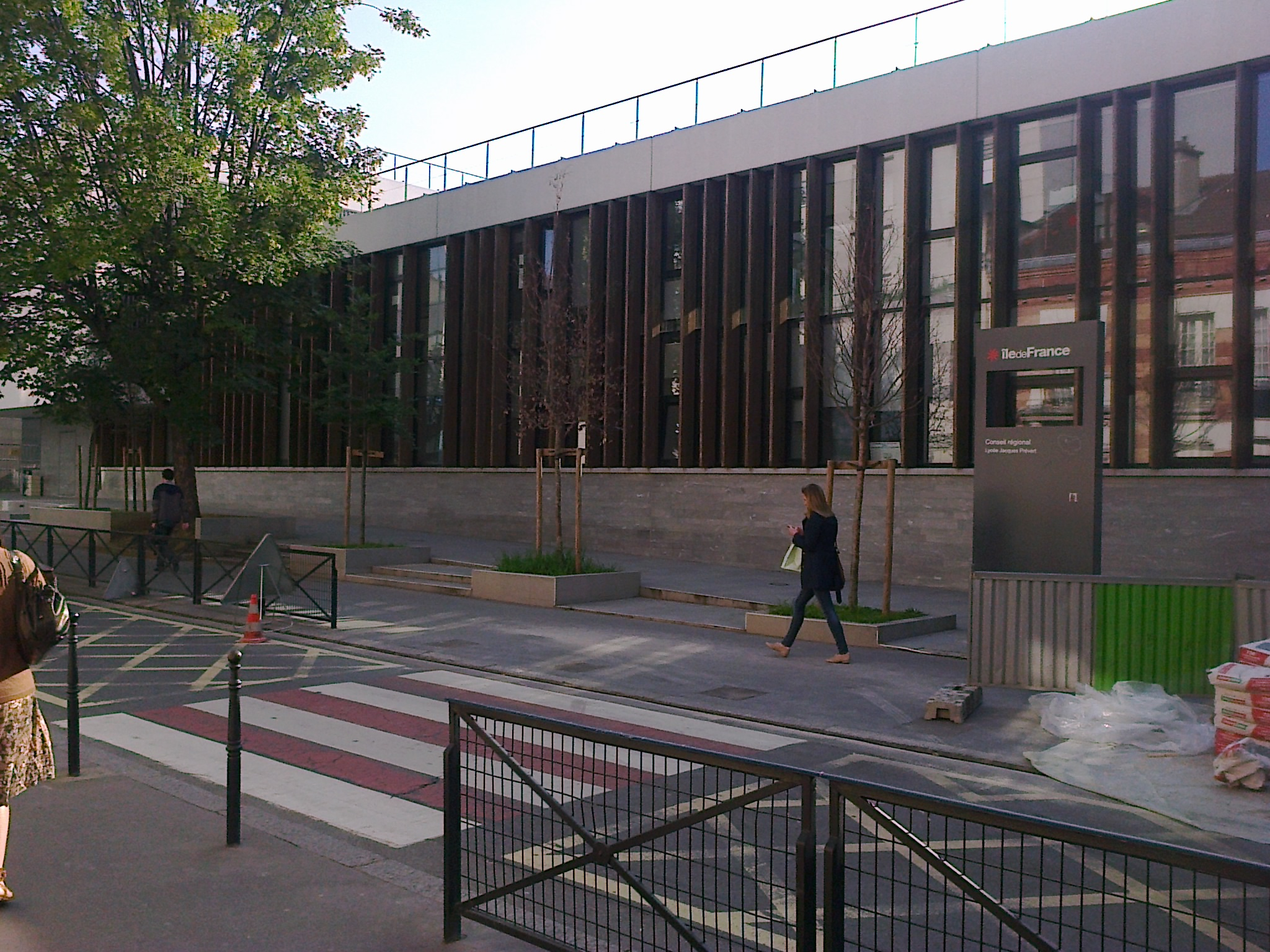

Location
- 163 Rue de Billancourt; 92100 Boulogne-Billancourt; France
- Coordinates: 48°50′0.103″N 2°14′15.922″E

Information
- Type: Lycée
- Established: September 1968
- School district: Académie de Versailles
- Principal: Pierre Carbajo
- Enrollment: 1400
- Website: www.lyc-prevert-boulogne.ac-versailles.fr

Lycée Jacques Prévert is a senior high school/sixth-form college in Boulogne-Billancourt, Hauts-de-Seine, France, in the Paris metropolitan area.

The school, the first senior high/sixth-form in Boulogne-Billancourt, opened in September 1968. Prior to formally adopting the name Lycée Jacques Prévert it had been called by several other names such as Lycée de Boulogne and Lycée Paul Bert. Its current building opened in 1989 and was extensively renovated around 2010.

Its audiovisual post-bac section, the STS Métiers de l'Audiovisuel, is well recognized in the French audiovisual sector.
