= Sophy Romvari =

Canadian actress and director

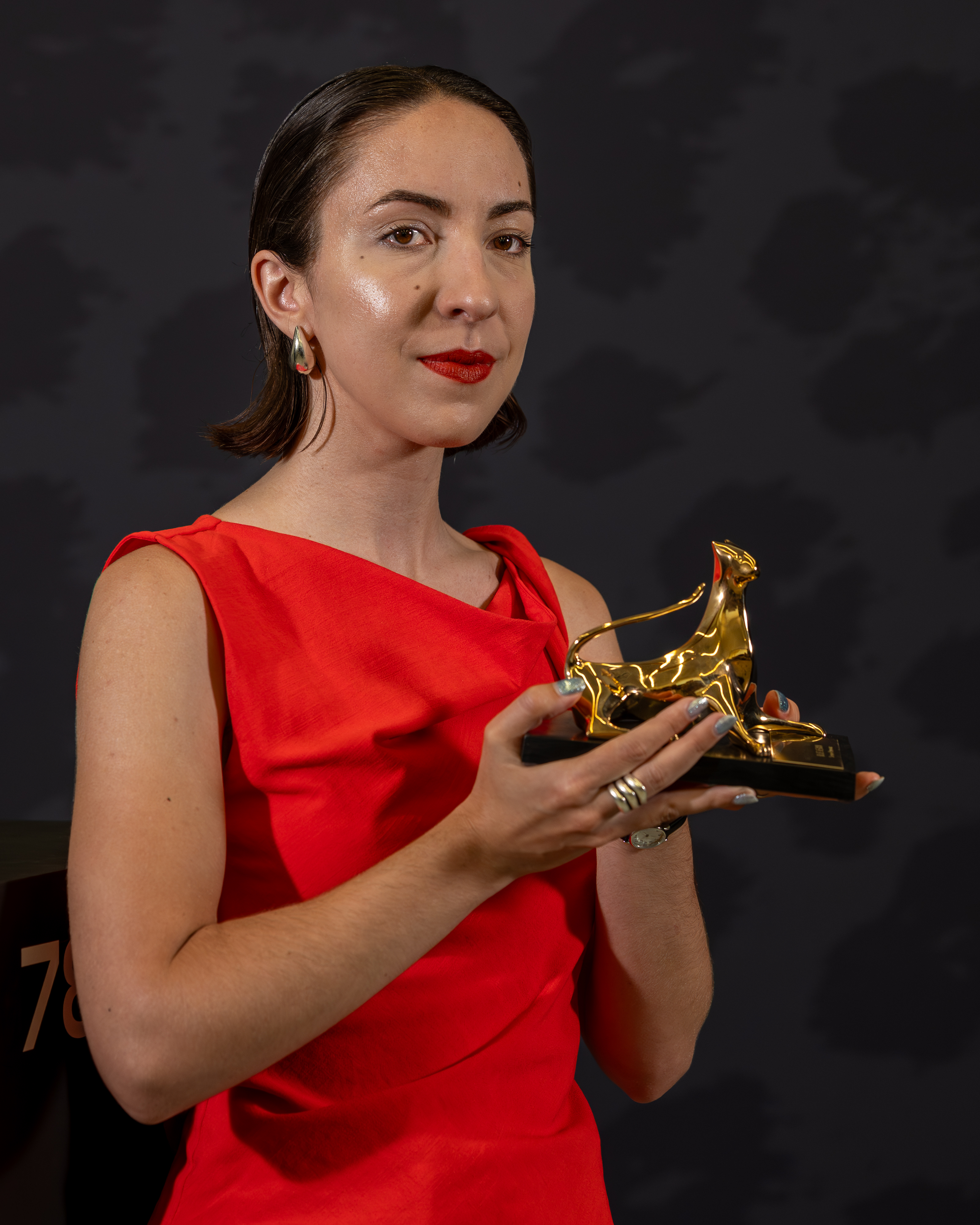
- Romvari at the 78th Locarno Film Festival
- Born: October 20, 1990 (age 35); Victoria, British Columbia, Canada
- Occupations: Director; writer; actress
- Years active: 2011–present
- Notable work: Blue Heron, Still Processing

Sophy Romvari (born October 20, 1990) (Note: Romvari mentions her age as two years old in 1992 in her short film Still Processing.) is a Canadian film director, writer, and actress. After attracting considerable attention online for her short film work, particularly the award-winning Still Processing (2020), Romvari won widespread critical acclaim and numerous accolades for her feature-length film debut Blue Heron (2025). A collection of Romvari's short films, including Still Processing, was released by The Criterion Collection on their streaming platform in 2022.

== Early life ==
The youngest of four siblings, Romvari was born in Victoria, British Columbia. Her three brothers emigrated from Hungary with her parents in 1989, one year before her birth. Romvari was raised on Vancouver Island.

Romvari studied film at Capilano University before moving to Toronto for her MFA at York University. Romvari also attended McGill University for one year before dropping out.

One of her early short films, Remembrance of József Romvári (2020), features home video footage of her as a child with her grandfather, Hungarian production designer József Romvári. This short film was included as a DVD special feature in the Kino Lorber release of three films by Hungarian director István Szabó (who worked with her grandfather).

== Career ==
=== Early short film work and Still Processing ===
Romvari began making short films in the early 2010s while attending film school. In 2017, Romvari's short film Pumpkin Movie premiered at the True/False Film Festival before screening at the Hot Docs Canadian International Documentary Festival and the Sheffield Doc/Fest. In 2018, her short film Norman Norman, which featured her own aging dog named Norman, premiered at the 2018 Toronto International Film Festival. Around this time, Romvari also directed In Dog Years (2019), a short documentary for CBC.

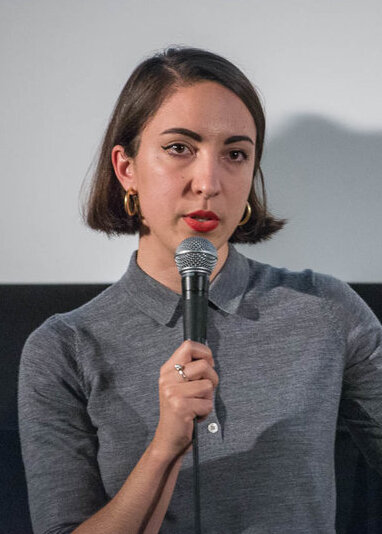
Romvari in early 2020

Still Processing, Romvari's thesis film from York University, attracted considerable attention online, and it had its world premiere at the 2020 Toronto International Film Festival during the COVID-19 pandemic. The film was later released online by Mubi in 2021, and won awards on the film festival circuit. Still Processing won the Audience Choice Award for Best Documentary Short at Indie Memphis and the Innovative Voice Award at the Diversions Film Festival in Croatia. The film received a Canadian Screen Award nomination for Best Short Documentary at the 10th Canadian Screen Awards in 2022. Still Processing is also notable for going viral online on film-focused social media website Letterboxd.

A collection of Romvari's short films, including Still Processing, was released by The Criterion Collection on their streaming platform in 2022.

Romvari's next short film, It's What Each Person Needs, premiered at the 2022 Toronto International Film Festival, marking her third short film to premiere at the festival after Norman Norman in 2018 and Still Processing in 2020. This short film received positive reviews from critics and was called a "stunning analysis on the foundations of identity."

=== Blue Heron ===
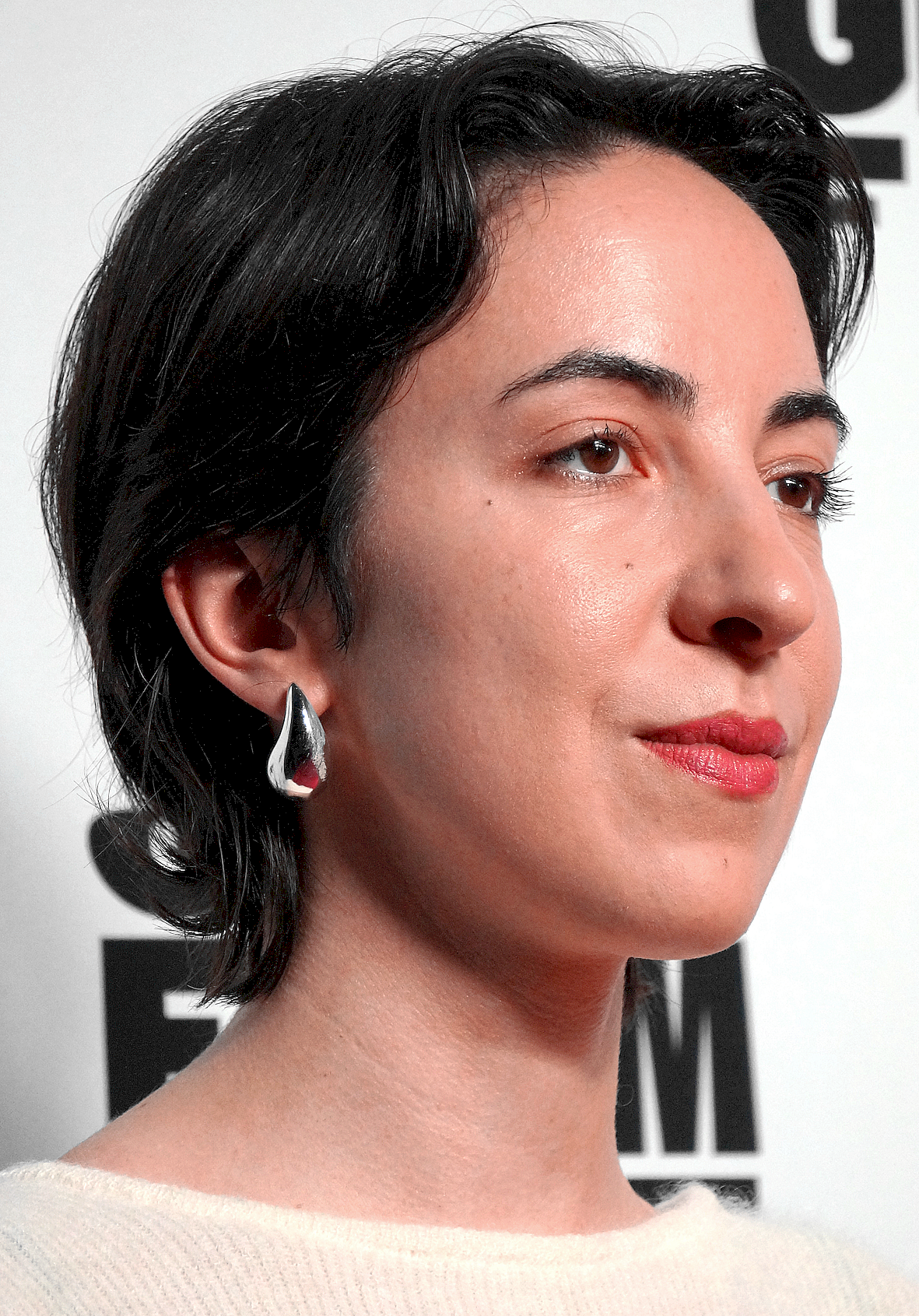
Romvari presenting Blue Heron at Film Fest Gent in 2025

Romvari's feature-length film debut, Blue Heron, entered production in 2024. Blue Heron had its world premiere at the 78th Locarno Film Festival on August 8, 2025, as part of the Concorso Cineasti del Presente competition. At Locarno, Romvari won the Swatch First Feature Award, which came with a CHF 15,000 prize.

Blue Heron subsequently had its Canadian premiere in the Centrepiece program at the 2025 Toronto International Film Festival, where it was the winner of the Best Canadian Discovery award. It has since screened at more than a dozen film festivals internationally, including the 44th Vancouver International Film Festival, where it won several awards; the Festival du nouveau cinéma, where it won the Grand Prix; the 56th International Film Festival of India; the Bangkok International Film Festival, and San Sebastián, where it won a Special Mention from the jury. Romvari won the award for Best First Feature from the Toronto Film Critics Association, and the $50,000 Rogers Best Canadian Film Award.

In an essay for CBC Arts, Romvari described Blue Heron as her "most significant attempt to capture just how fallible memory is."

In October 2025, Blue Heron was acquired for commercial distribution in the United States by Janus Films.

== Filmography ==
=== Short films ===
Year	Title	Director	Writer	Producer	Notes
2016	Nine Behind	Yes	Yes	Yes	
2016	Let Your Heart Be Light	Yes	Yes	No	Co-directed with Deragh Campbell
2017	Pumpkin Movie	Yes	Yes	Yes	
2017	It's Him	Yes	Yes	Yes	
2018	Grandma's House	Yes	Yes	Yes	
2018	Norman Norman	Yes	Yes	Yes	Documentary
2019	In Dog Years	Yes	Yes	Yes	Documentary
2020	Some Kind of Connection	Yes	Yes	No	Co-directed with Mike Thorn
2020	Oh, to Realize	Yes	Yes	Yes	
2020	Remembrance of József Romvári	Yes	Yes	No	Documentary
2020	Still Processing	Yes	Yes	Yes	Documentary
2022	It's What Each Person Needs	Yes	Yes	Yes	Documentary

=== Feature films ===
Year	Title	Director	Writer	Producer	Notes
2025	Blue Heron	Yes	Yes	Yes	Co-produced with Ryan Boykin, Sarah Wylie, and Gábor Osvath

=== Acting roles ===
- Let Your Heart Be Light (2016)
- From Nine to Nine (2016)
- Pumpkin Movie (2017)
- Spice It Up (2018)
- The Sunless Remembered (2018)
- Preface to History (2019)
- Tiger Eats a Baby (2020)

== Accolades ==
Award	Date of ceremony	Category	Nominated work	Result	Ref.
Locarno Film Festival	August 16, 2025	Golden Leopard – Filmmakers of the Present	Blue Heron	Nominated	
Locarno Film Festival	August 16, 2025	Swatch First Feature Award	Blue Heron	Won	
Toronto International Film Festival	September 14, 2025	Best Canadian Discovery	Blue Heron	Won	
Director's Guild of Canada	2025	Jean-Marc Vallée DGC Discovery Award	Blue Heron	Shortlisted	
Vancouver International Film Festival	8 October 2025	Horizon Award for Emerging Canadian Director	Blue Heron	Won	
Vancouver International Film Festival	8 October 2025	Arbutus Award for Best British Columbia Director	Blue Heron	Won	
Festival du nouveau cinéma	2025	National Competition, Grand Prix for Best Feature Film	Blue Heron	Won	
Mannheim-Heidelberg International Film Festival	2025	Rainer Werner Fassbinder Award	Blue Heron	Won	
Toronto Film Critics Association	2025	Rogers Best Canadian Film	Blue Heron	Won	
Toronto Film Critics Association	2025	Best First Feature	Blue Heron	Won	
Canadian Screen Awards	May 31, 2026	Best Motion Picture	Blue Heron	Nominated	
Canadian Screen Awards	May 31, 2026	Best Director	Blue Heron	Nominated	
Canadian Screen Awards	May 31, 2026	Best Original Screenplay	Blue Heron	Nominated	
Canadian Screen Awards	May 31, 2026	John Dunning Best First Feature Award	Blue Heron	Nominated	
