= Gradiva (disambiguation) =

Gradiva is a modern mythic figure created by Wilhelm Jensen. It may also refer to:

== Literature ==
- Gradiva (novel), a 1902 novella by Wilhelm Jensen
- Delusion and Dream in Jensen's Gradiva, a 1907 essay by Sigmund Freud

== Film ==
- Gradiva, a 1970 film by Giorgio Albertazzi
- Gradiva, a 2006 film by Alain Robbe-Grillet
- La Gradiva, a 2026 film by Marine Atlan

== Other uses ==
- Gradiva, a scientific journal published by SUNY Press
- Sasha Gradiva (born 1979), American singer
