= Diana al-Hadid =

American artist

- Born: 1981 (age 44–45); Aleppo, Syria
- Education: Kent State University; Virginia Commonwealth University; Skowhegan School of Painting and Sculpture
- Known for: sculpture, installation
- Spouse: Jon Lott
- Children: 1
- Website: dianaalhadid.com

Fool's Gold, 2014, polymer gypsum, fiberglass, wood, plaster, cement, gold leaf

Diana al-Hadid (born 1981) is a Syrian-born American contemporary artist whose practice encompasses sculpture, installation and drawing across a diversity of media. She resides and maintains her studio in Brooklyn, New York, and is represented by Kasmin Gallery.

== Early life and education ==
Al-Hadid was born in 1981 in Aleppo, Syria. When she was five, her family immigrated to Cleveland, Ohio, though she was raised principally in North Canton, Ohio. She grew up in an Islamic household. Al-Hadid resolved at the age of eleven to become an artist. She drew inspiration from family holidays to the Middle East, during which she visited the Jeita Grotto in Lebanon and encountered Islamic architecture.

In 2003, Al-Hadid received a BA in Art History and a BFA in Sculpture from Kent State University in Ohio. In 2005, she received an MFA in Sculpture from Virginia Commonwealth University in Richmond. In 2007, she attended the Skowhegan School of Painting and Sculpture, the same year in which she held her first solo exhibition.

== Professional career ==
Al-Hadid makes sculptures from a large variety of materials such as steel, fiberglass, wood, aluminum, bronze, cardboard, expanded polystyrene, reinforced polymer gypsum, and wax. She often works large-scale, working up to 4 meters tall, making large dreamlike or ghostly architectural forms out of dripping repetitive forms.

Much of Al-Hadid's sculpture is inspired by architecture, Surrealism, and painting. Al-Hadid notes architectural influences such as: the Sagrada Familia, a house built by Salvador Dali, the architectural theorist Christian Norberg-Schulz, as well as the intricacy and ornamentation found in Islamic and Gothic architecture. Painting influences for Al-Hadid include northern Renaissance painting, Mannerist painting, Pieter Bruegel, Cy Twombly, and the presence of floating figures. Figures have shown up in her later work; she notes: "Islamic belief forbids figuration, and it's something I want to address."

Many of Al-Hadid's sculptures have narrative or mythological references, such as Scheherzade, Ariadne, and Gradiva from Wilhelm Jensen's 1903 novella of the same name, who was also celebrated by the Surrealists. Al-Hadid states: "I was raised [...] in a culture that very much prizes storytelling and the oral tradition. My work is partially inspired by myths and folklore from both Western and Arabic cultures."

Al-Hadid cites Judy Pfaff and David Altmejd as sculptural inspirations.

In 2018, Al-Hadid had her first public art installation, entitled Delirious Matter, in Madison Square Park. The installation featured four sculptures placed around the park made of polymer gypsum and fiberglass. Delirious Matter was supported in part by an award from the National Endowment for the Arts.

In 2019, Al-Hadid was commissioned by MTA Arts & Design to create a permanent installation of two murals in the mezzanine spaces at the 34th Street. The two murals, entitled The Arches of Old Penn Station and The Arc of Gradiva, were recognized by the CODAawards.

== Other activities ==
- Institute for Contemporary Art at VCU, Member of the Advisory Board

== Collections and awards ==
In 2009, she held a USA Rockefeller Fellowship and was a New York Foundation for the Arts Fellow. She was awarded a Pollock-Krasner Foundation Grant in 2007 and a Joan Mitchell Foundation Grant in 2011. In 2020, she received the Academy of Arts and Letters Art Award. In 2021, she received a Smithsonian Artist Research Fellowship to conduct research at the Freer Gallery of Art.

Collections holding her work include the DeCordova Museum and Sculpture Park, the Whitney Museum of American Art and the Virginia Museum of Fine Arts. Al-Hadid has exhibited work at the Secession in Vienna, Austria.
