= Gradiva =

Modern mythic figure created by Wilhelm Jensen

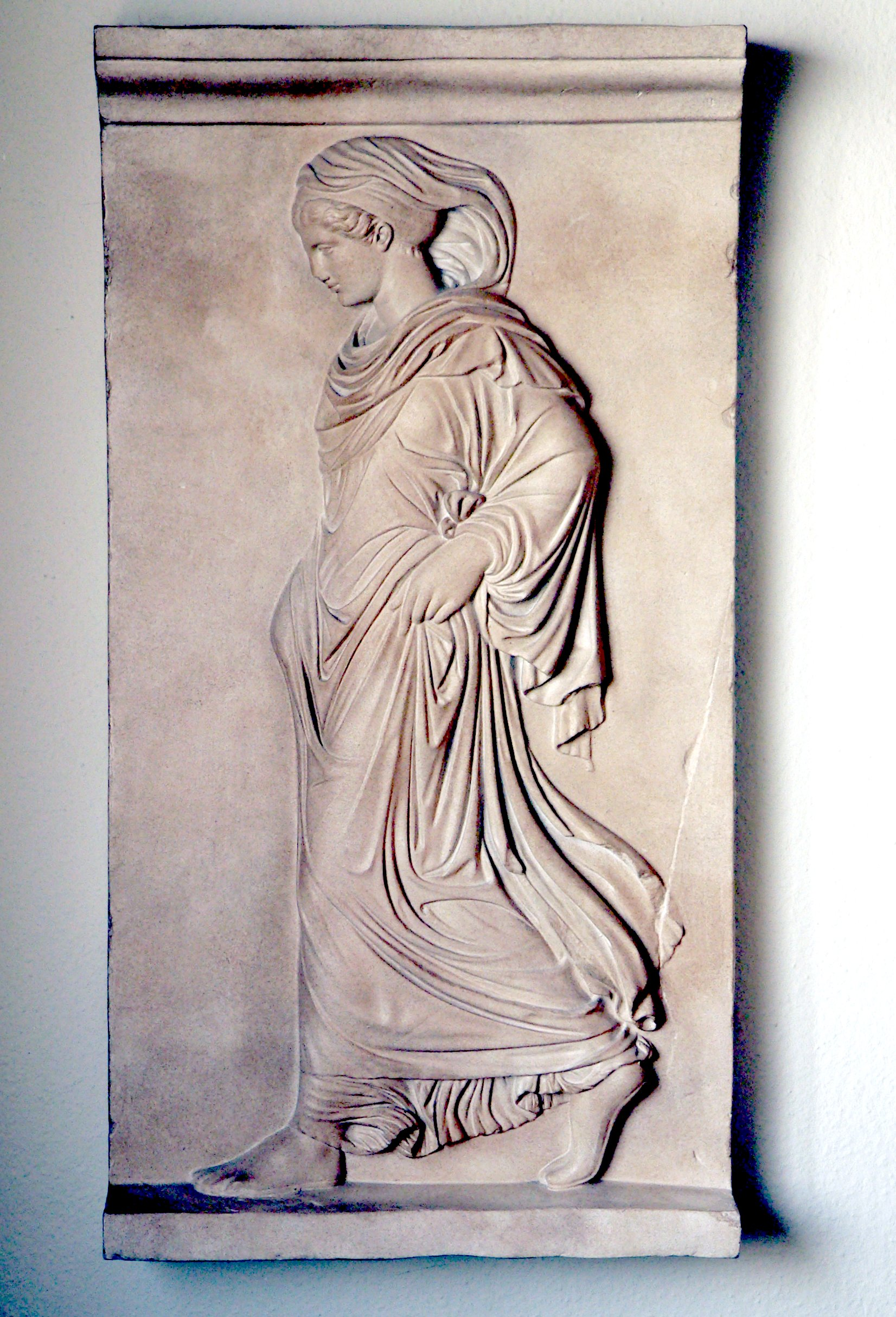
The original Roman relief upon which Gradiva was based (Vatican City).

Gradiva, or "She who steps along", is a mythic figure created by Wilhelm Jensen as a central character in his novella Gradiva (1902). The character was inspired by an existing Roman relief. She later became a prominent subject in Surrealist art after Sigmund Freud published an essay on Jensen's work.

== Origins ==
The character first appeared in Wilhelm Jensen's eponymous novella Gradiva. In the novella, the protagonist is fascinated by a female figure in an ancient relief and names her Gradiva, Latin for "she who steps along". The name is also mentioned by the author to be an homage to Mars Gradivus, the Roman god of war.

Early after Gradiva’s publication, psychoanalyst Wilhelm Stekel recommended the novella to his colleague Sigmund Freud, and later Carl Jung renewed his interest into it. Freud found the narrative compelling, and published his influential essay titled Delusion and Dream in Jensen's Gradiva (German: "Der Wahn und die Träume in W. Jensen's Gradiva") in 1907. Afterwards, he exchanged a few letters with Jensen, who was "flattered by Freud's analysis of his story".

== Description ==
The relief is a neo-Attic Roman relief, which is likely a copy of a Greek original from the 4th century BCE. The full relief has three female figures identified as the so called Horae and Agraulids: Herse, Pandrosus and Aglaulos. The relief was reconstructed by archaeologist Friedrich Hauser from fragments found in multiple separate museum collections.

The Gradiva fragment is held in the collection of the Vatican Museum Chiaramonti, Rome. The rest of the relief is on display in the Uffizi Museum in Florence.

== Posterity ==
Salvador Dalí nicknamed his wife, Gala Dalí, "Gradiva". He used the figure of Gradiva as inspiration in a number of his paintings, for which his wife often served as the model. These paintings included Gradiva (1931), Gradiva finds the ruins of Antropomorphos (1931), William Tell and Gradiva (1931).

Gradiva inspired other Surrealist paintings as well. One such example, Gradiva (1939) by André Masson, explores the sexual iconography of the character.

In 1937 the Surrealist leader André Breton opened an art gallery in Paris called Galerie Gradiva. The façade was designed by Marcel Duchamp, and included a door in the shape of a man and woman in close contact.

In 1966, the Swedish poet Göran Printz-Påhlson published a collection of poems entitled Gradiva och andra dikter. The book consist of four sections, the first of which is a dramatic paraphrase of Jensen’s novella.

In 1970, the actor and filmmaker Giorgio Albertazzi released a film titled Gradiva, based on Jensen's novel and featuring Laura Antonelli as Gradiva. Albertazzi is best known for his portrayal of the male protagonist in Last Year at Marienbad, a film written by Alain Robbe-Grillet, who would himself go on to direct a film based on Jensen's novel.

The short art film Gradiva Sketch 1 (1978, camera: Bruno Nuytten) by the French filmmaker Raymonde Carasco was described as “a poetic construction about the fetishization of desire, one that seems to go against Freud's reading: the gracious movement of the maiden's foot is seen to be the object itself, not a mere referent, of male desire”.

In 1986, the Surrealist writer and ethnographer Michel Leiris, together with Jean Jamin, founded Gradhiva, an academic journal covering topics in anthropology. Since 2005, it has been published by the Musée du quai Branly in Paris.

In 2007, the writer and filmmaker Alain Robbe-Grillet released a film titled C'est Gradiva Qui Vous Appelle ("It's Gradiva Who is Calling You"), which was roughly based on the novel, although updated to more recent times. It begins with an English art historian who is doing research in Morocco on the paintings and drawings that French artist Eugène Delacroix (1798 – 1863) produced over a century before, when he travelled to the country as part of a diplomatic mission. Spotting a beautiful, mysterious blonde woman (Gradiva) in flowing robes, dashing through the back alleys of Marrakesh, he becomes consumed with the need to track her down.
