= Robert Zahn (archaeologist) =

German classical archaeologist

Robert Zahn (9 January 1870, in Bruchsal – 27 November 1945, in Berlin) was a German classical archaeologist, specializing in ceramics and other small objects of Greek antiquity.

He studied classical philology and ancient history at the University of Heidelberg and worked as an assistant in the archaeological institute at the university. In 1896 he received his doctorate at Heidelberg as a student of Friedrich von Duhn, and afterwards participated in excavations at the Acropolis in Athens. In 1901 he became a directorial assistant at the Department of Antiquities in Berlin, where in 1931 he succeeded Theodor Wiegand as director. In 1928 he received an honorary professorship from the University of Berlin.

== Selected works ==
- Die Darstellung der Barbaren in griechischer Litteratur und Kunst der vorhellenistischen Zeit (doctoral thesis, 1896) – Representation of barbarians in Greek literature and art of the pre-Hellenistic period.
- Vasenscherben aus Klazomenai, 1898 – Vase shards from Klazomenai.
- Zur Midasvase aus Eleusis, 1899 – On the Midas vase of Eleusis.
- Hellenistische Reliefgefässe aus Südrussland, 1908 – Hellenistic relief vessels from southern Russia.
- Ktō Chrō : glasierter Tonbecher im Berliner Antiquarium, 1923 – Ktō Chrō: glazed clay cup in the Berlin Antiquarium.
- Die antiken Vasen von der Akropolis zu Athen (with Botho Graef, Ernst Langlotz, Paul Hartwig and Paul Wolters) – The ancient vases from the Acropolis.
- Zur hellenistischen Schmuckkunst, 1930 – On Hellenistic jewelry.
