= Gohar Homayounpour =

Psychoanalyst and author

Gohar Homayounpour (Persian: گهر همایون‌پور; born 1977 in Paris) is a psychoanalyst and Gradiva Award–winning author. She currently lives in Paris, France.

== Career and work ==
Homayounpour is a member of the International Psychoanalytical Association (IPA), the American Psychoanalytic Association (APsaA), the Italian Psychoanalytical Society (SPI), and the National Association for the Advancement of Psychoanalysis (NAAP). She is a Training and Supervising Analyst of the Freudian Group of Tehran, of which she is the founder and past president, and a member of the IPA group Geographies of Psychoanalysis.

She is also a member of the Advisory Board of the Sigmund Freud Museum in Vienna, Austria.

She is an invited international lecturer and is actively involved in teaching, supervision, and publishing across a broad range of institutions and universities worldwide. She serves on the editorial board of The Psychoanalytic Quarterly and on the editorial board of Psychoanalysis, Culture & Society.

Her first book, Doing Psychoanalysis in Tehran, was published by MIT Press in 2012 with a foreword by Abbas Kiarostami. It won the Gradiva Award in 2013 and has been translated into several languages.

Her second book, Persian Blues: Psychoanalysis and Mourning, was published by Routledge in 2022.

== Selected works ==
- Homayounpour, Gohar (2022-06-16). Persian Blues, Psychoanalysis, and Mourning (1 ed.). London: Routledge. doi:10.4324/9781003269113. ISBN 978-1-003-26911-3.
- Homayounpour, Gohar (2012). Doing Psychoanalysis in Tehran. The MIT Press. ISBN 978-0-262-01792-3. JSTOR j.ctt5hhcxh.
