= Carol Jeffrey =

British psychotherapist, writer

- Born: Editha Caroline Cowley; 31 October 1898; White Hall, Worcestershire, England
- Died: 6 November 1998 (aged 100); Charing, Kent, England
- Education: University of London
- Occupations: Psychotherapist, writer
- Spouse: Tom Jeffrey
- Children: Three

Carol Jeffrey (31 October 1898 – 6 November 1998) was an English psychotherapist, known for working with children and being one of the original staff members at Open Way Association, which was a group that performed psychotherapy in a revolutionary way. She published her first book at the age of 98.

== Early life ==
She was born Editha Caroline Cowley in White Hall, Worcestershire on 31 October 1898, the daughter of Robert Cowley, who had worked as a designer with William Morris and later as a manager at Liberty in Regent Street, before taking on his parents' farm in Worcestershire.

== Education ==
Jeffrey was home schooled and went on to receive her bachelor's degree from the University of London in 1919. Since her family could not afford to support her through doctoral training, she instead received a teaching diploma in 1920. Later on, she was able to return to school, and received her postgraduate diploma in individual psychology in 1945.

== Career ==
Jeffrey began her career as a music and English teacher. When she married Tom Jeffrey, she reluctantly left her job, as was the norm at the time. But in her own time she began teaching at home just as she had been taught at home by her mother until she reached the age of 15. In doing so, she showed a particular interest in those students who were exhibiting emotional difficulties.

Once she received her postgraduate diploma in individual psychology, she began working in the field of child guidance. She and a colleague both noticed that the rules set for staff got in the way of effective therapy, so her colleague founded the Open Way Association and Jeffrey joined as a psychotherapist. She also worked closely with a colleague of Carl Jung.

Located in West London, the Open Way was not limited to any one approach or dogma and for that it received criticism from "establishment" institutions. Still its highly qualified staff held the course of treatment intact and the practice continued until the early 1970s with Jeffrey serving as a leading consultant.

Later on, when the clinic closed, Jeffrey established her own private practice where she saw patients until 1994 when she officially retired. Even so, in 1997 she gave her last lecture at the Open Way, the year before she died.

== Legacy ==
She published an award winning semi-autobiography at the age of 98 called That Why Child. In that book, she discussed her perception of the causes of child psychopathology.

Carol Jeffrey died in Charing, Kent on 6 November 1998.

== Honors and awards ==
1997: Jeffrey received the Gradiva Award for best book in the Childhood Related section from the National Association for the Advancement of Psychoanalysis in the United States.
