= Marie Jensen =

German painter (1845–1921)

- Born: 31 August 1845; Würzburg
- Died: 18 December 1921 (aged 76); Prien am Chiemsee
- Occupation: portrait painter
- Spouse: Wilhelm Jensen (m. 1865; died 1911)
- Children: 6

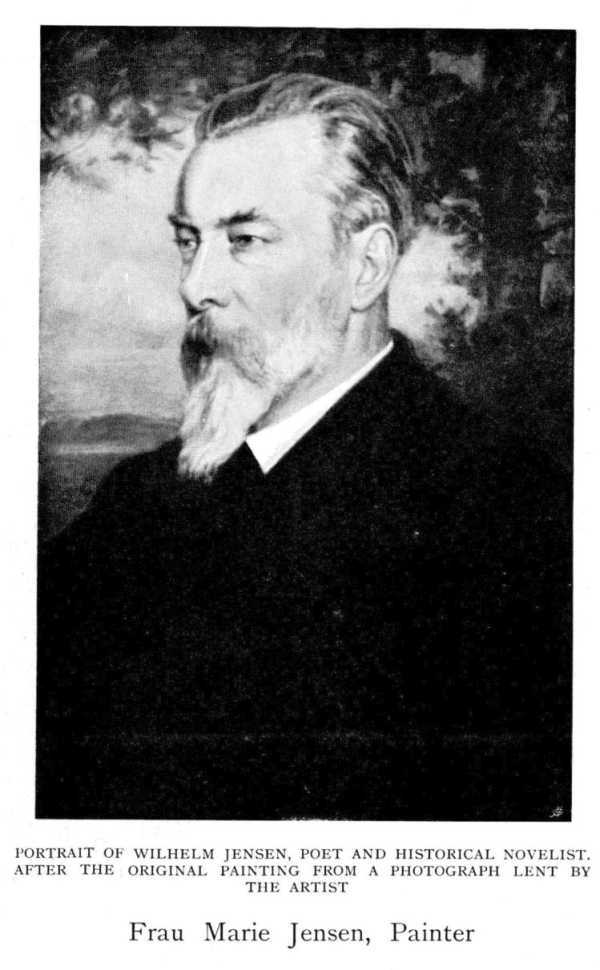
Portrait of Wilhelm Jensen

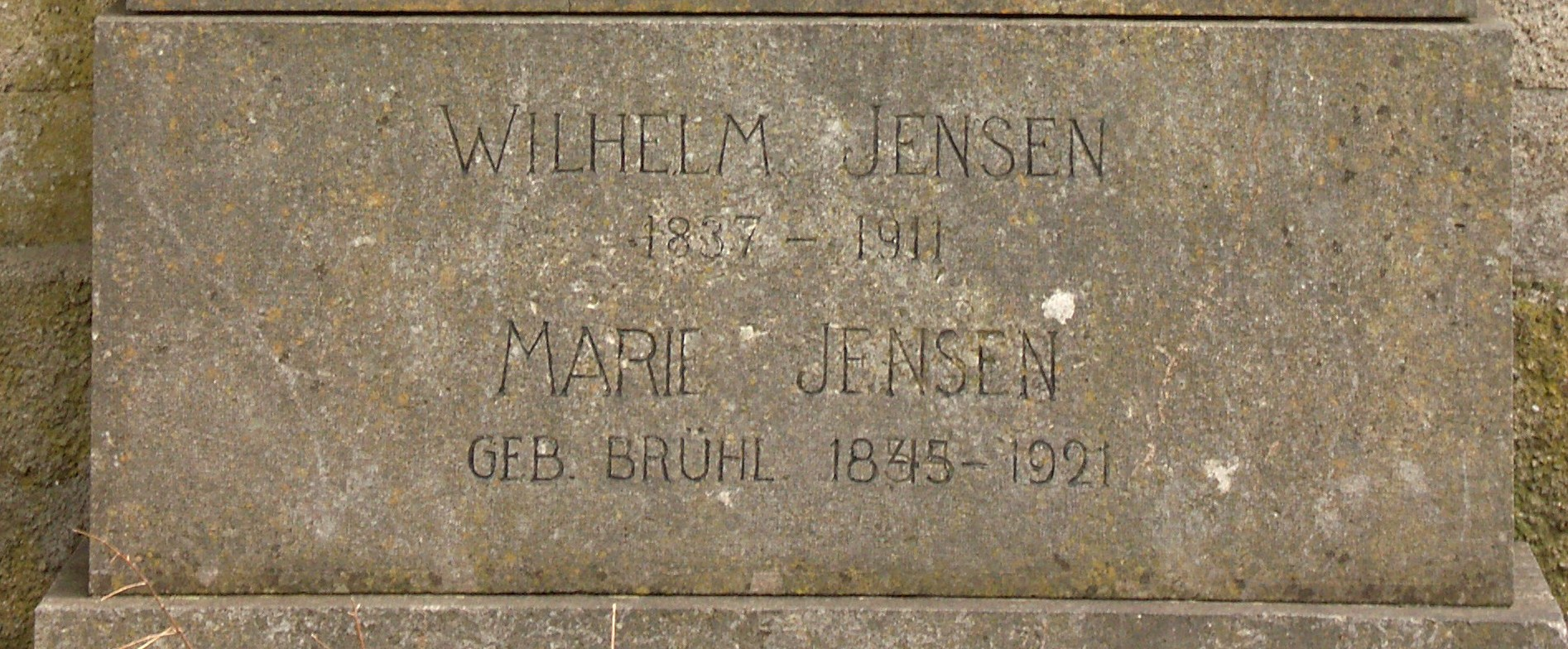
Birth and death dates of the Jensen couple on their grave in Fraueninsel

Marie Jensen (31 August 1845 – 18 December 1921) was a German portrait painter. Jensen was born in Würzburg as the daughter of the German writer Johann August Moritz Bruehl (1819–1877). In 1865 she married the poet and historical novelist Wilhelm Jensen in Vienna, whose portrait she painted. It was included in the book Women Painters of the World. The couple had six children, of which four survived. The couple first lived in Stuttgart, and then moved to Kiel where their youngest daughter Katharina was born (she later married Ernst, Prince of Saxe-Meiningen, and had six children). In 1872 they moved to Freiburg where they met the landscapist Emil Lugo, who made 50 plates for their book on the surroundings of Freiburg and the Black Forest. When the Jensens moved to Munich Lugo accompanied them, and when they spent summers in Fraueninsel, he accompanied them as well. Marie is buried there with her husband under a gravestone by the artist Bernhard Bleeker next to the grave of Emil Lugo.
