= Klazomenai =

Ancient city

- Κλαζομεναί (Ancient Greek)
- Clazomenae
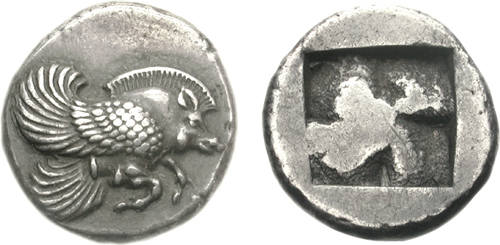
- Coin from Klazomenai depicting a winged boar, 499 BC

- Location within Turkey
- 38°21′29.4″N 26°46′3.3″E
- Type: Settlement
- Location: Urla, İzmir Province, Turkey
- Region: Ionia

Klazomenai (Ancient Greek: Κλαζομεναί) or Clazomenae was one of the 12 cities of ancient Ionia (the others being Chios, Samos, Phocaea, Erythrae, Teos, Lebedus, Colophon, Ephesus, Priene, Myus, and Miletus). It is located at the south coast of Smyrna Gulf, Ionia, and a member of the Ionian League. It was one of the first cities to issue silver coinage. Its ruins are now located in the modern town Urla near İzmir in İzmir Province, Turkey.

== Location ==
Klazomenai is located in modern Urla (Vourla (Βουρλά) in Greek) on the western coast of Anatolia, on the southern coast of the Gulf of İzmir, at about 32 kilometres (20 mi) west of İzmir. The city was originally located on the mainland at Limantepe, but probably during the early fifth-century BC Ionian Revolt from the Persians, it was moved to the Karantina Island just off the coast. Soon after that, the city of Chyton was founded on the mainland the late fifth-century BC. Both cities had conflictual relations but Alexander the Great eventually connected Karantina island to the mainland with a causeway, the remains of which are still visible.

== Mythology ==
A silver coin minted in Klazomenai shows the head of Apollo, the principal god of the city. According to myth, swans drew the chariot in which Apollo every year flew south from his winter home in the land of the Hyperboreans. But Klazomenai was also home to large numbers of swans, and it is thought that the verb klazo was used to describe the call of the wild birds. The swan on the obverse is both an attribute of Apollo and a pun on the name Klazomenai.

== History ==
=== Iron Age ===
Though not in existence before the arrival of the Ionians in Asia, its original founders were largely settlers from Phlius and Cleonae. It stood originally near Limantepe; but the inhabitants, alarmed by the encroachments of the Persians, moved to the Karantina island of the bay, and established their city there.

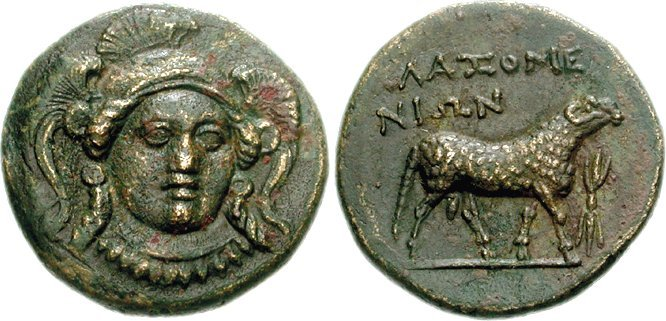
Coinage of Klazomenai, Ionia, circa 386-301 BC

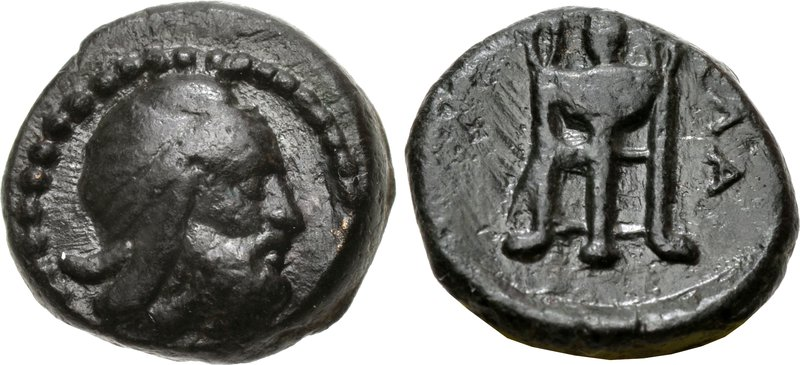
Coinage of Achaemenid satrap Tiribazos, 388-380 BC. Klazomenai mint.

Clazomenae was attacked by the Lydian king Alyattes in the 6th century.

=== Classical Age ===
During the 5th century it was for some time subject to the Athenians, but about the middle of the Peloponnesian War (412 BC) it revolted. After a brief resistance, however, it again acknowledged the Athenian supremacy, and repelled a Lacedaemonian attack. In 387 BC Klazomenai and other cities in Asia were taken over by Persia, but the city continued to issue its own coins.

The philosopher Anaxagoras (c. 510 – 428 BC), often styled "Anaxagoras of Clazomenae", was born in Clazomenae, as was the earlier philosopher Hermotimus of Clazomenae.

Herodotos of Klazomenai was the first Clazomenian Olympic winner, his victory being in the boys foot-race. The Clazomenians dedicated a statue of him at Olympia, Greece.

Scopelian or Skopelianos of Clazomenae (Σκοπελιανός), was an ancient Greek sophist.

==== Roman period ====
Under the Romans, Clazomenae was included in the province of Asia, and enjoyed an immunity from taxation.

Clazomenae became a Christian bishopric early. Its bishop, Eusebius took part in the Council of Ephesus in 431 and the Council of Chalcedon in 451. Another, Macarius, participated in the Council of Constantinople (869), which is seen within the Catholic Church as the eighth ecumenical council. Although still documented at the end of the 14th century, it is no longer a residential bishopric. Accordingly, Clazomenae is today listed by the Catholic Church as a titular see.

== Archaeology ==
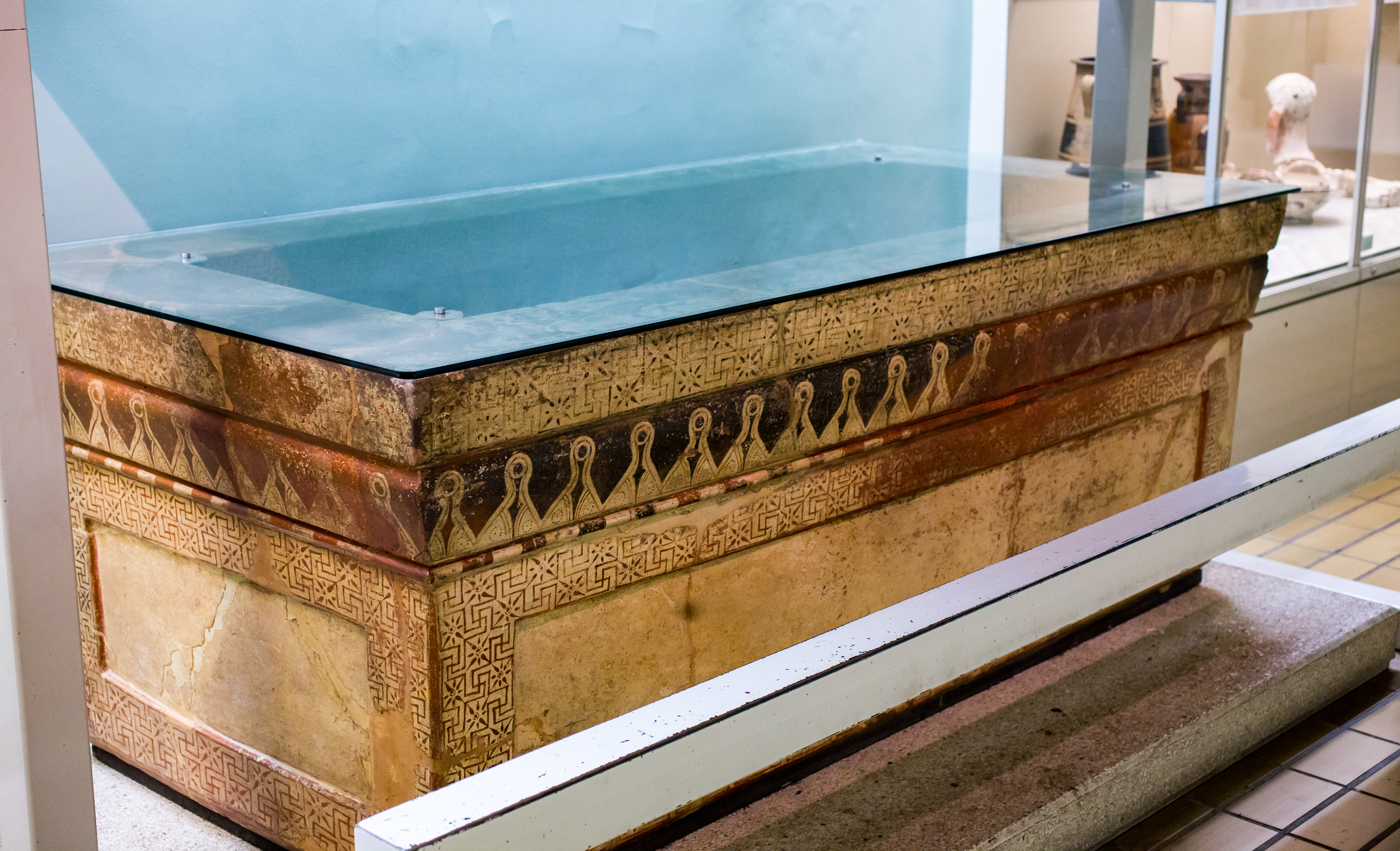
Large terracotta sarcophagus with painted scenes from Klazomenai in the British Museum (510-480 BC)

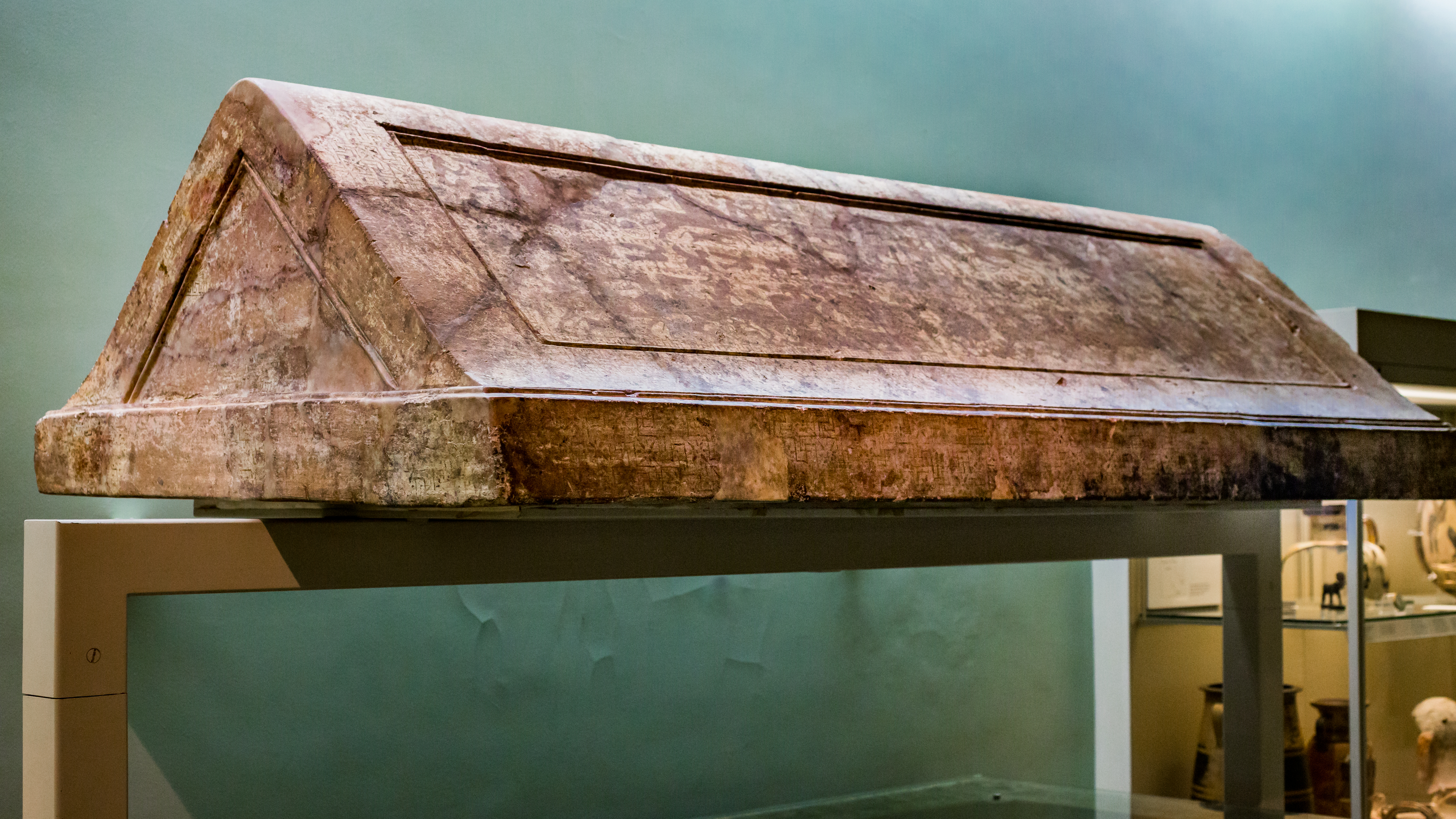
Lid from the same sarcophagus

The site of Liman Tepe, which lies near an old harbour contains very important Bronze Age excavations, the most prominent and remarkable of which is the amount of varying archaic burial sites, as well as evidence of the practises associated with them close by. One possible explanation for this is that these sites were used by different social groups within society.

The city was famous for production and exports of olive oil and its painted terracotta Klazomenian sarcophagi, which are the finest monuments of Ionian painting in the 6th century BC.

A large painted terracotta sarcophagus and lid, together weighing about 2 tonnes, were discovered in the vicinity of Klazomenai in the late nineteenth century. An ancient Greek work dating to about 500 BC, the funerary objects depict war scenes, chariot racing, hunting as well as geometric patterns throughout and is now in the British Museum's collection.

It was also prized for its variety of garum.

== Ancient olive press ==
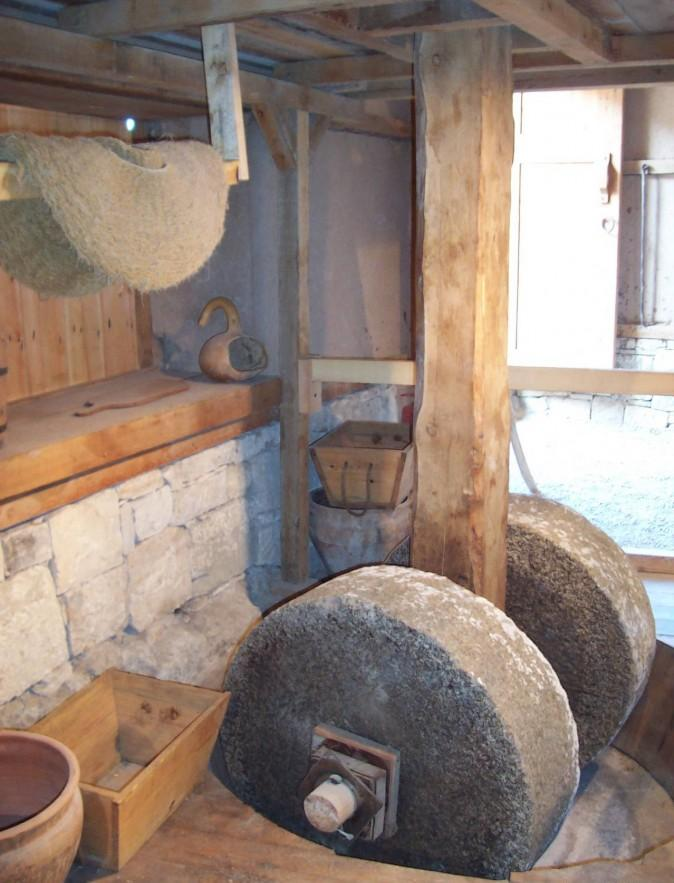
Olive oil extraction workshop at Klazomenai

Olive oil extraction installation (işlik) dating back to the third quarter of the 6th century BC uncovered in Klazomenai is the only surviving example of a level and weights press from an ancient Greek city and precedes by at least two centuries the next securely datable earliest presses found in Greece. It was restored and reconstructed in 2004–2005 through collaboration between Ege University, a Turkish olive-oil exporter and a German natural building components company, as well as by local artisans, on the basis of the clearly visible millstone with a cylindrical roller and three separation pits. The olive oil obtained turned out to be quite a success in business terms as well. The reconstructed olive oil press is located on the original mainland site of Klazomenai, at 38°21′40.4″N 26°46′13.3″E.

== Financial pioneers ==
In an event noted by Aristotle, Klazomenians also appear as financial pioneers in economic history, for having used one commodity (olive oil), in an organized manner and on a city-scale, to purchase another (wheat), with interests refundable on the value of the first. Around 350 B.C., suffering from a shortage of grain and scarcity of funds, the rulers of the city passed a resolution calling on citizens who had stores of olive oil to lend to the city at interest. The loan arranged, they hired vessels and sent them to ports of exportation of grain and bought a consignment on the pledged security of the value of the oil.

== See also ==
- List of ancient Greek cities
- Klazomenian vase painting
- Limantepe; the prehistoric site in Urla
