= Limantepe =

Site of a Bronze Age settlement

Coordinates: 38°21′48″N 26°46′33″E

Limantepe (Liman Tepe; Gr. Larisa), is a town located on Turkey's western coast is the site of a prehistoric (Bronze Age) settlement that includes an ancient port dating from 3300bce located underwater offshore. The area is situated in the urban zone of the coastal town of Urla near İzmir. In pre-classical antiquity and during the Hellenistic and Roman eras, it was a Greek town called Larissa.

== History ==
The harbor settlement was inhabited starting from 3300bce and was equipped with a fortification wall partially submerged in the sea. The settlement changed significantly over time, and is one of the oldest known artificial harbors in the Aegean Sea. The underwater find includes vessels and urns that are believed to have arrived at the port from Greece and maybe Cyprus via the Black Sea. It is argued that this could make Limantepe the oldest, as well as the longest inhabited center of the Aegean coast of Anatolia.

Three important cultural layers apart from those of the classical period have been encountered at Limantepe up to the present, as well as evidence for the presence of Chalcolithic remains.

=== Early Bronze Age ===
The Early Bronze Age was from around 3300/3200-2000 BC in Anatolia.

The lowest layer belongs to the Early Bronze Age and dates from the 3rd millennium B.C. onwards. Three phases of this layer have been excavated so far and the number of phases is expected to increase as the excavations proceed.

==== Anatolian Trade Network ====
Liman Tepe was part of the Anatolian Trade Network, mainly from Cilicia into Izmir region and Troy. Liman Tepe traded into the Aegean with the Kastri culture. This trade network went through the whole of Anatolia, as well as Thrace, and towards the Mesopotamia.

This Kastri settlement, belonging to this period, shows numerous cultural connection with Limantepe. This was an intermediary in the trade that went from Limantepe towards the Cyclades. The ancient settlement of Kastri on Syros island belongs to the Kastri culture from the early Bronze Age in Greece, dating to the period ca. 2500–2200 BC. Kastri has a similar fortification system with horseshoe-shaped bastions as Limantepe.

The pottery assemblage from Kastri is also very similar to that found in Limantepe and elsewhere in Anatolia at the time. The depas vessels, the bell-shaped cups, and incised pyxides "are entirely Anatolian in character". The tin bronzes are also quite similar.

Evidence from this early period in Limantepe also indicates cultural ties with the nearby prehistoric sites of Tepekule, Bayraklı within the city of İzmir (which was later to form the core of "Old Smyrna") and with Panaztepe site at the mouth of the River Gediz (later Hermus during the Classical Age). Also there are clear connections with Cyprus.

=== Middle Bronze Age ===
Some of these cultural ties continued also in the Middle Bronze Age.

The second cultural layer of Limantepe consists of five phases that belong to the Middle Bronze Age and which dates from the first half of the 2nd millennium B.C. onwards. Furter east, the Assyrian Trade Network spread on the Anatolian plateau.

=== Late Bronze ===
==== Hittite period ====
The third layer belongs to the Late Bronze Age and covers the time period from the 14th to the 13th century B.C., roughly contemporary with the Trojan War. Some of the artifacts discovered from this period reflect a cultural proximity with the Mycenean culture. This region would have been part of the Kingdom of Mira, a vassal of the Hittite Empire.

=== Iron Age ===
==== Ionian period ====
One of the most important finds at the site was made in 2007 when a wooden merchant ship anchor dating from the 7th century B.C. and which is likely to be the oldest ever found, was discovered wedged in the sea ground during the underwater explorations of Limantepe.

In the 6th century BC, the area was attacked by king Alyattes of Lydia.

=== Classical Age ===
In the Persian period, fears of Persian attacks saw a reorganization of settlements in this region during the Ionian Revolt, with Klazomenai being moved to an offshore island.

In the Hellenistic and Roman periods, the site was known in Greek as Larisa. Nearby are the remains of Klazomenai,

== Excavations ==
The archaeological site was discovered by Ekrem Akurgal in 1950, and its exploration has been pursued on land and underwater since 1979 by an international team and many of the artifacts discovered are currently on display in İzmir Archaeology Museum. It is very close but separate from the site of Klazomenai, inhabited as of the Iron Age and which itself had changed location several times during its history in the same area between the mainland and Karantina Island across its coastline. Israeli archaeologists and divers including students from Haifa University have helped investigate.

== Resources ==
- Beverly Nicole Goodman (2006). "The Paleography of Limantepe, Turkey: A multi-proxy geoarchaeological study". Department of Maritime Civilizations, University of Haifa. Archived from the original on 2008-09-07.
- Armağan Erkanal - Hayat Erkanal (2007). "Vorbericht ueber die Grabungen 1979 in praehistorischen Klazomenai/Limantepe" (PDF) (in German). Hacettepe University. Archived from the original (PDF) on 2011-07-22.
- Beverly Nicole Goodman (2009). "A geoarchaeological multi-proxy study unveils the ancient paleocoastline and harbors of Liman Tepe Turkey". Terra Nova.

== Sources for introductory information ==
- "Limantepe". Focus Mediterranean Magazine. 2007. Archived from the original on 2008-10-09.
- "Answering Ankara's call for an underwater project". University of Haifa Focus. 2000.
- Peter Tomkins (1997). "Answering Ankara's call for an underwater project". Sheffield Graduate Journal of Archaeology, University of Sheffield.
