= Gradhiva =

- Discipline: anthropology
- Language: French, English

Publication details
- History: 1986–2008
- Publisher: Musée du quai Branly, Paris (France)
- Frequency: Biannual
- Open access: ?From late 2008 Delayed open access journal (3 years)

Standard abbreviations
- ISO 4: Gradhiva

Indexing
- ISSN: 0764-8928

Links
- Journal homepage

Gradhiva is an anthropological and museological journal, founded in 1986 by the poet and social scientist Michel Leiris and by the anthropologist Jean Jamin. Since 2005, it has been published by the Musée du Quai Branly in Paris.

Its title derives from a novel by W. Jensen (Gradiva) which was the basis for a famous investigation by Sigmund Freud, and that strongly inspired the Surrealists. Leiris ans Jamin inserted an "H" in the word to highlight that the journal focused on the History of anthropology, and that the editing was done at the Musée de l'Homme in Paris. The title thus became the acronym "Groupe de Recherches et d'Analyses Documentaires sur l'HIstoire et les Variations de l'Anthropologie" ("Research and Documentary Analysis Group, History and Variations of Anthropology"). It was edited by Jean Jamin between 1986 and 1996, by Françoise Zonabend from 1996 to 2006, and by Erwan Dianteill from 2006 until 2008.

Initially dedicated to the history and the archives of anthropology, it maintained its original mission, yet later opened up to a greater extent to contemporary developments of anthropology and museology. Based on original examinations and the publication of archives, 'Gradhiva was open to a variety of disciplines: ethnology, aesthetics, history, art history, sociology, literature and even music. Finally, it sought to develop an interaction between the text and images through high-quality and original iconography.

In 2007, the anthropologist Sally Price ended her review article on Gradhiva in The Museum Anthropology Review by saying:

For anyone who's interested in anthropology, history, and museums, this journal remains an essential resource, rich in its articles and beautiful in its presentation.

Gradhiva was published by the French publisher Jean Michel Place until 2004.

In 2009, the journal was retitled as Anthropology of Art, with a new direction.
