= Neo-Attic =

Greek and Roman art style

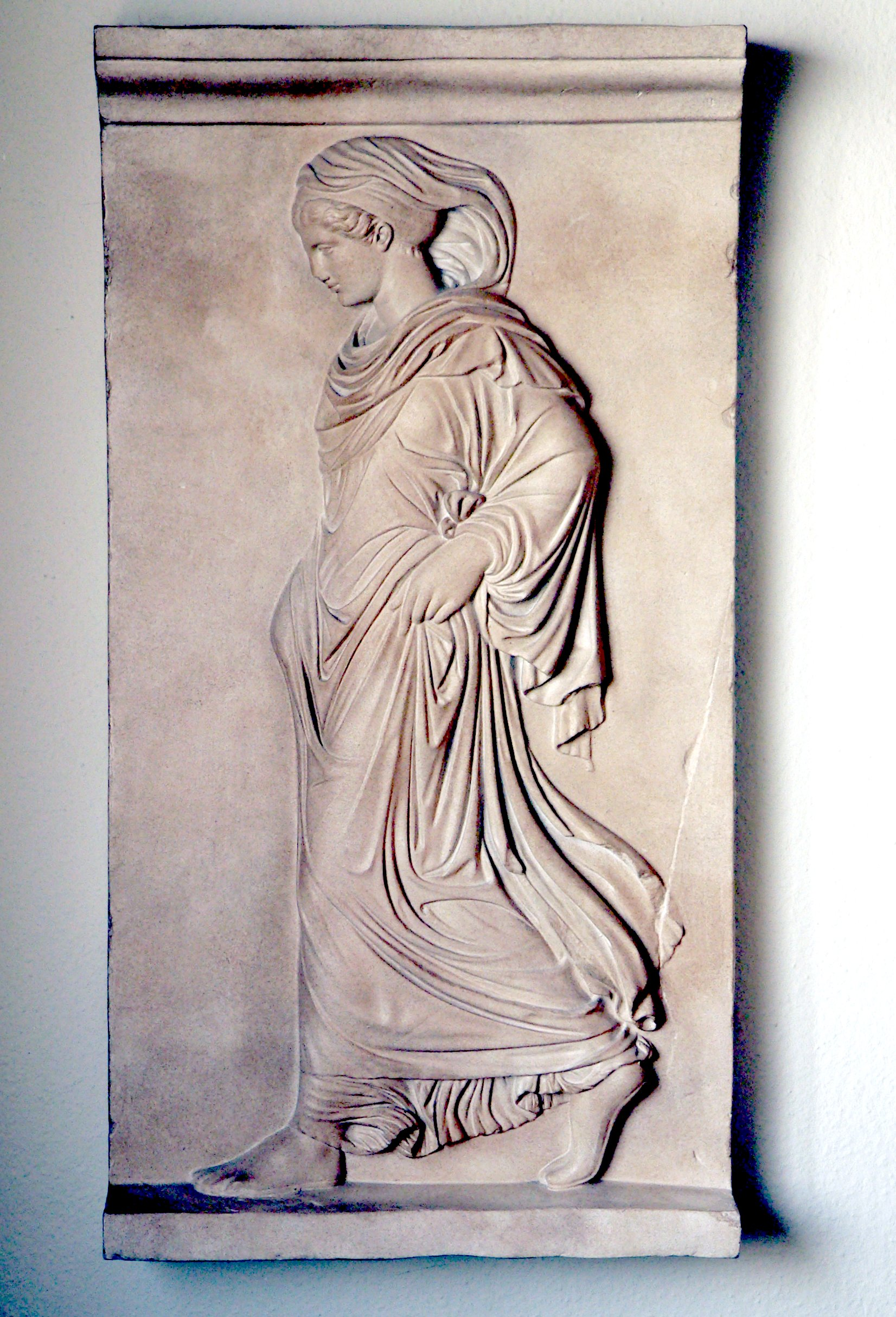
The Gradiva, an example of a Neo-Attic sculpture

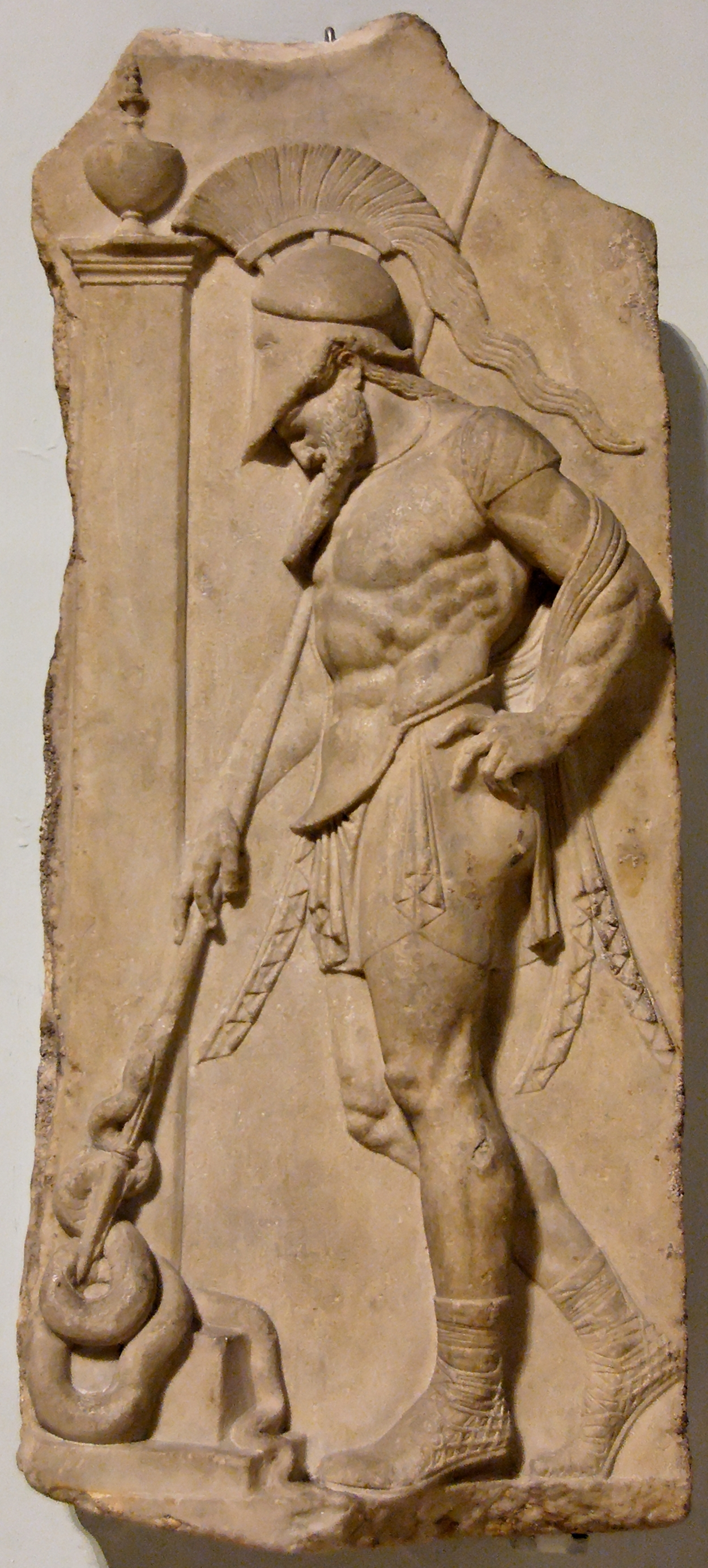
Another Neo-Attic relief (British Museum)

Neo-Attic or Atticizing is a sculptural style, beginning in Hellenistic sculpture and vase-painting of the 2nd century BC and climaxing in Roman art of the 2nd century AD, copying, adapting or closely following the style shown in reliefs and statues of the Classical (5th–4th centuries BC) and Archaic (6th century BC) periods. It was first produced by a number of Neo-Attic workshops at Athens, which began to specialize in it, producing works for purchase by Roman connoisseurs, and was taken up in Rome, probably by Greek artisans.

The Neo-Attic mode, a reaction against the baroque extravagances of Hellenistic art, was an early manifestation of Neoclassicism, which demonstrates how self-conscious the later Hellenistic art world had become. Neo-Attic style emphasises grace and charm, serenity and animation, correctness of taste in adapting a reduced canon of prototypical figures and forms, in crisp and refined execution.

This style designation was introduced by the German classical archaeologist and art historian Friedrich Hauser (1859-1917), in Die Neuattischen Reliefs (Stuttgart: Verlag von Konrad Wittwer, 1889). The corpus that Hauser called "Neo-Attic" consists of bas-reliefs molded on decorative vessels and plaques, employing a figural and drapery style that looked for its canon of "classic" models to late fifth and early fourth-century Athens and Attica.
