= Klazomenian sarcophagi =

Type of ancient Greek sarcophagus

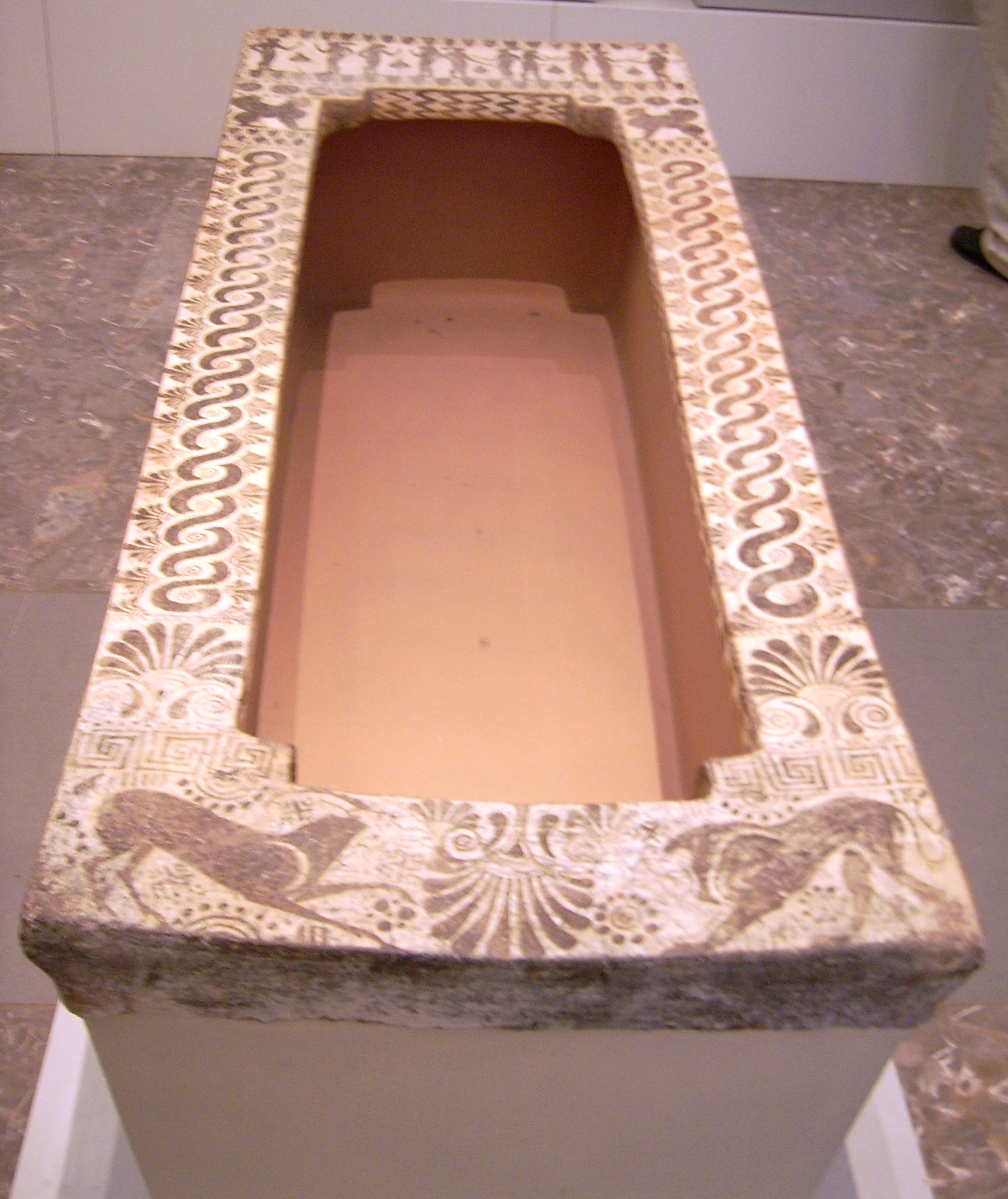
Klazomenai sarcophagus in the Antikensammlung at Berlin.

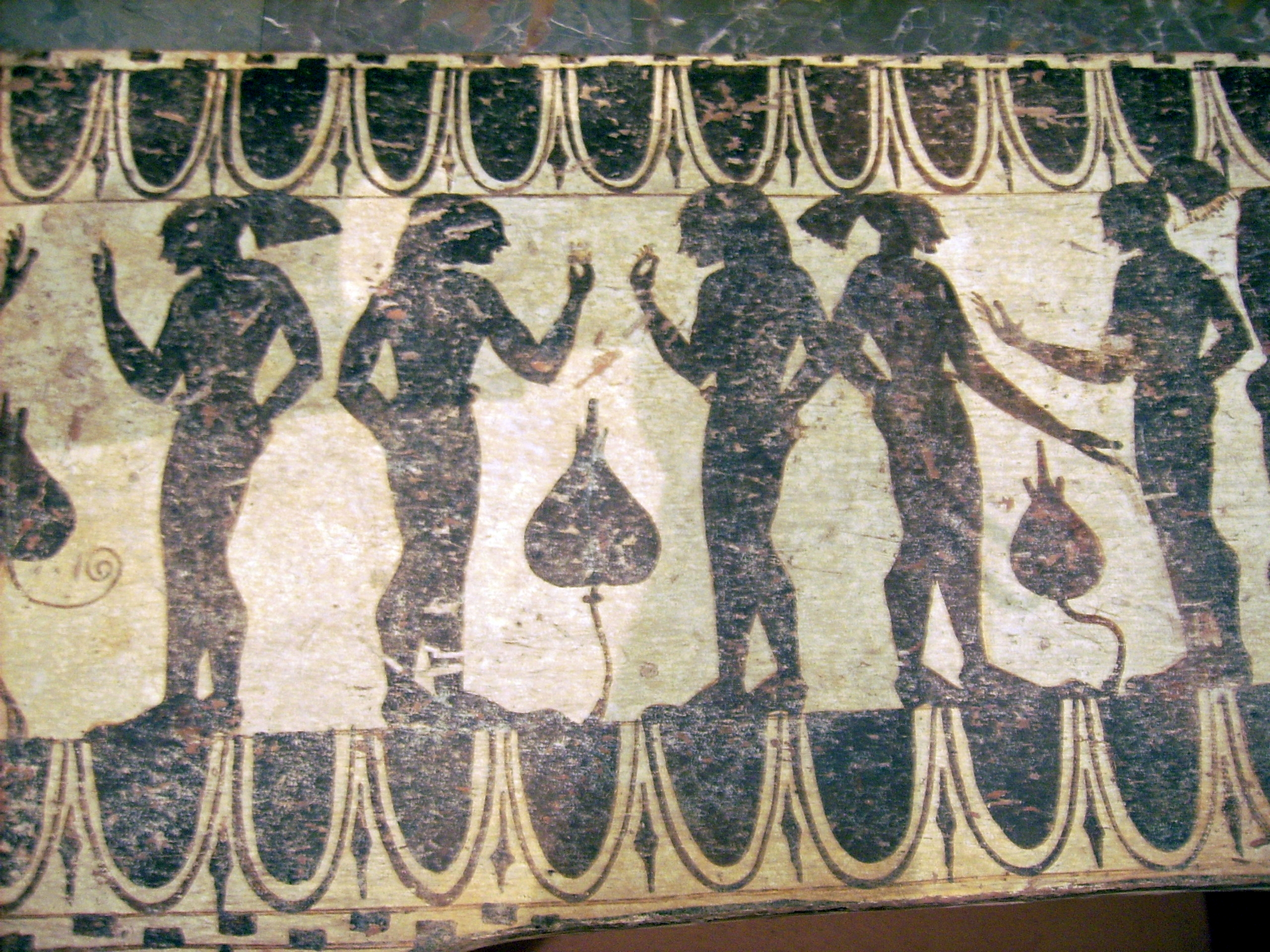
Detail of the headpiece, with a homoerotic scene involving aristocratic youths.

Klazomenian Sarcophagi (also Clazomenian Sarcophagi or Klazomenai Sarcophagi) are a type of ancient Greek sarcophagus named after the Ionian Greek city of Klazomenai, where most examples were found. They are made of coarse clay in shades of brown to pink. Added to the basin-like main sarcophagus is a rectangular broad frame, often covered with a white slip and then painted.

The second major site for these sarcophagi is Smyrna. A few others have been found in Rhodes, Samos, Lesbos and Ephesos. They were probably produced in Klazomenai, between 550 BC (Late Archaic) and 470 BC (Early Classical).

== Manufacture and use ==
The large clay sarcophagi were manufactured and fired as a single piece. The workshops were probably near the cemeteries. It is assumed that the firing kilns were built over the unfired sarcophagi.

Due to the relatively complex and time-consuming method of manufacture, it is unlikely that the sarcophagi were only ordered after the death of their intended occupants. Instead, they were either acquired already during their lifetimes, or simply produced in such amounts as to have stocks available when needed. The sarcophagi, with their weight of about 350 kg, then had to be transported only a short distance to the grave. The deceased was carried to the cemetery in a procession and then placed in his or her sarcophagus, which had already been inserted into the ground up to the height of its rim. For this reason, only the top parts of the sarcophagi bear decoration (if any). It was then closed with a stone slab. After the funerary rites, a mound of sand was placed on top.

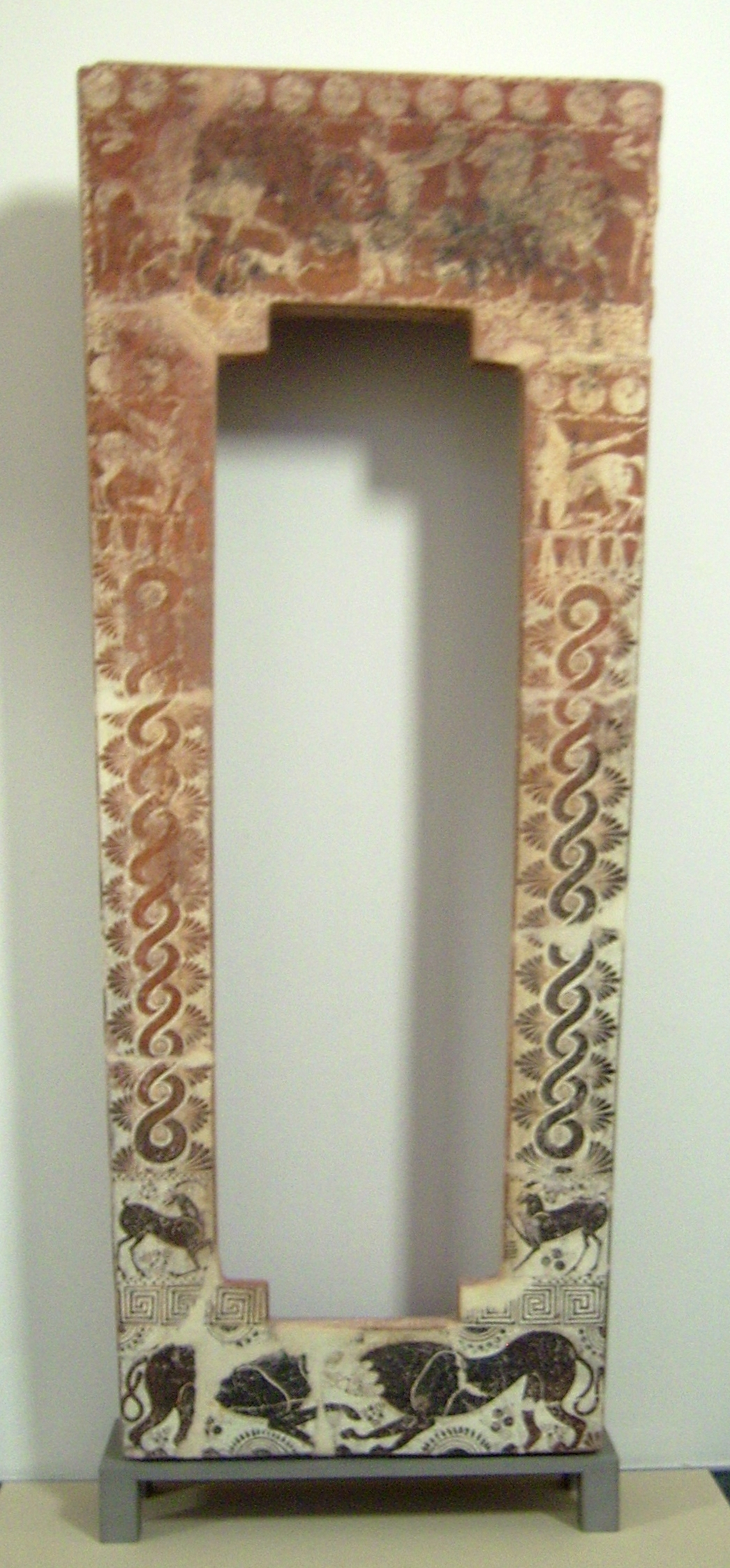
Klazomenai sarcophagus in the Pergamonmuseum.

The workshops that produced such objects were probably mainly specialised in making clay decorative elements for architecture.

== Decoration ==
During the first two decades, sarcophagi were only decorated with ornamentation. Then, figural depictions were added to the head and foot ends. The headpieces, which were higher, often received scenes of combat, hunting and athletic contests, executed in the black-figure technique. Details were not incised but added in white paint. Usually only shade-like traces of such internal detail survive. The images are mostly concerned with aspects of life that would be relevant to the local aristocracy. Only a small proportion was executed in the red-figure technique. The head end often bore scenes of animal fights in silhouette technique. They were influenced by the late animal frieze style. The sides often bear ornaments such as palmettes and rope patterns. One of the earliest recognised painters is the Borelli Painter, others include the Albertinum Painter and the (late) Hopkinson Painter.

Today, museum exhibits normally display only the frames of the sarcophagi. The basins were often smashed after discovery, as only the painted parts were considered of interest, and transport would be facilitated by reducing the object's weight.

== See also ==
- Klazomenian vase painting

== Bibliography ==
- John Boardman: Early Greek Vase Painting. 11th -6th Centuries BC. A Handbook, Thames and Hudson, London 1998 p. 149 ISBN 0-500-20309-1
- Robert Manuel Cook: Clazomenian sarcophagi, van Zabern, Mainz 1981 (Forschungen zur antiken Keramik Reihe II: Kerameus. Vol 3) ISBN 3-8053-0388-2
- Thomas Mannack in Griechische Vasenmalerei. Eine Einführung, Theiss, Stuttgart 2002, p. 135 ISBN 3-8062-1743-2
- Ellen Schraudolph: Der Klazomenische Sarkophag des Kestner-Museums, in EOS 4/1998, pp. 8–12
