= Friedrich Hauser =

German classical archaeologist and art historian

Friedrich Hauser (Stuttgart 1859–Baden-Baden, 1917) was a German classical archaeologist and art historian. His most famous single publication is Die Neuattischen Reliefs (Stuttgart: Verlag von Konrad Wittwer, 1889) in which he identified a style-category he called "Neo-Attic" among sculpture that was being produced in later Hellenistic circles during the last century or so BCE and in the early Roman Empire; the corpus that Hauser called "Neo-Attic" consists of bas-reliefs molded on decorative vessels and plaques, employing a figural and drapery style that looked for its canon of "classic" models to late 5th and early 4th century Athens and Attica, an early form of Neoclassicism.

John Beazley, who established the technique of identifying the artistic personalities of individuals and workshops in Attic vase-painting, to construct a history of workshops and artists in ancient Athens— much as Giovanni Morelli had recently done for the artists of the quattrocento—considered Hauser and the other German scholars Adolf Furtwängler, who had applied Morellian techniques to Ancient Greek sculpture, and Paul Hartwig among his mentors, though Beazley's method did not simply follow theirs.
