= Sarcophagus =

Stone coffin

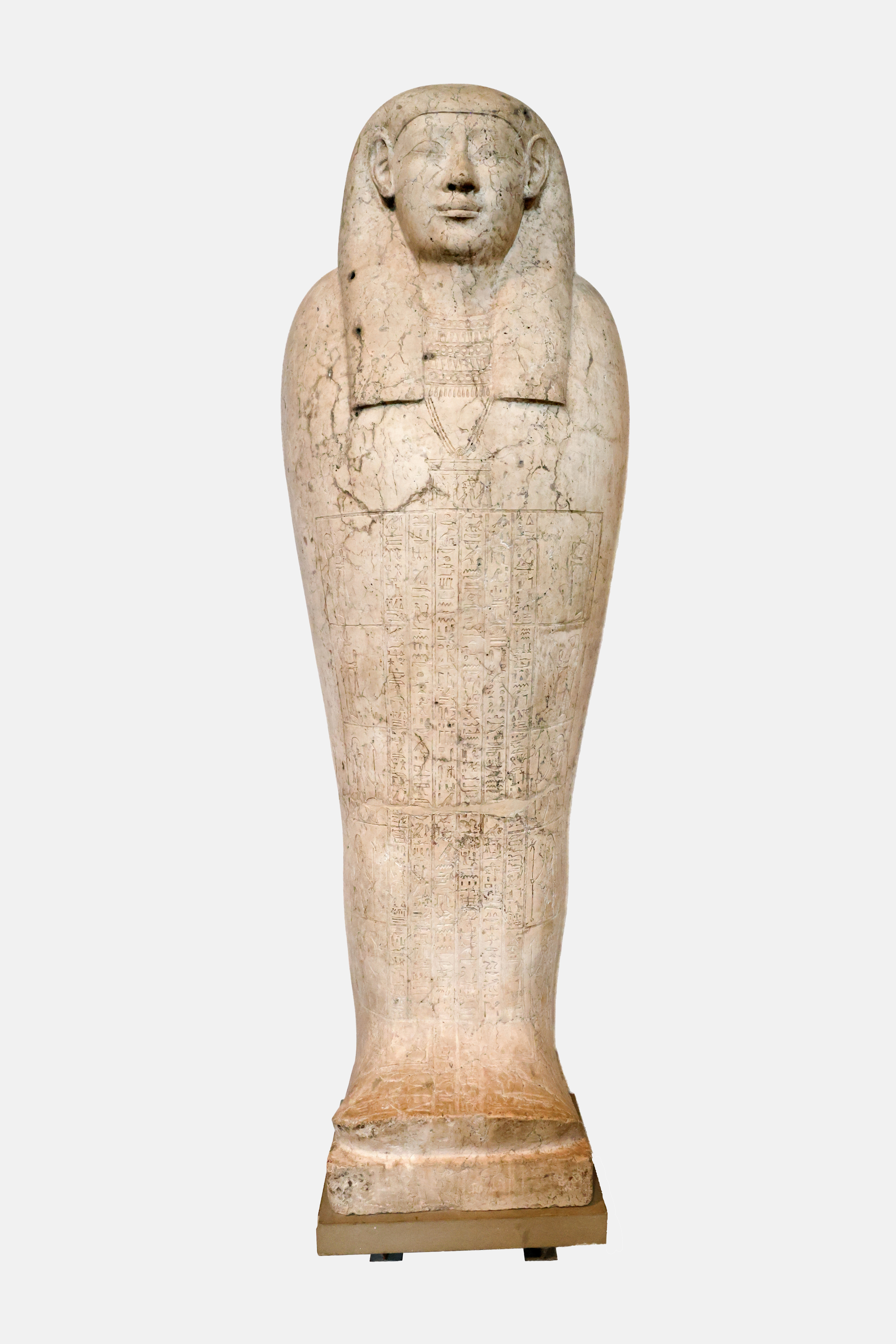
Ancient Egyptian sarcophagus lid.

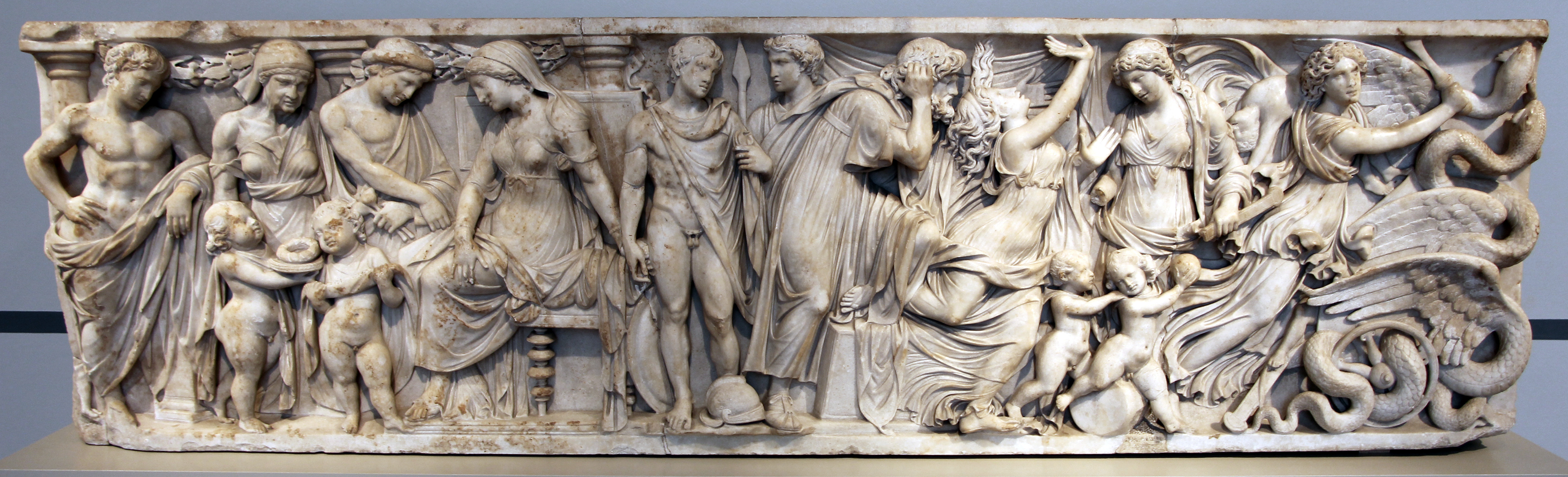
Roman sarcophagus with the myth of Medea, c. 140–150 AD, from Rome, exhibited in the Antikensammlung Berlin (Berlin)

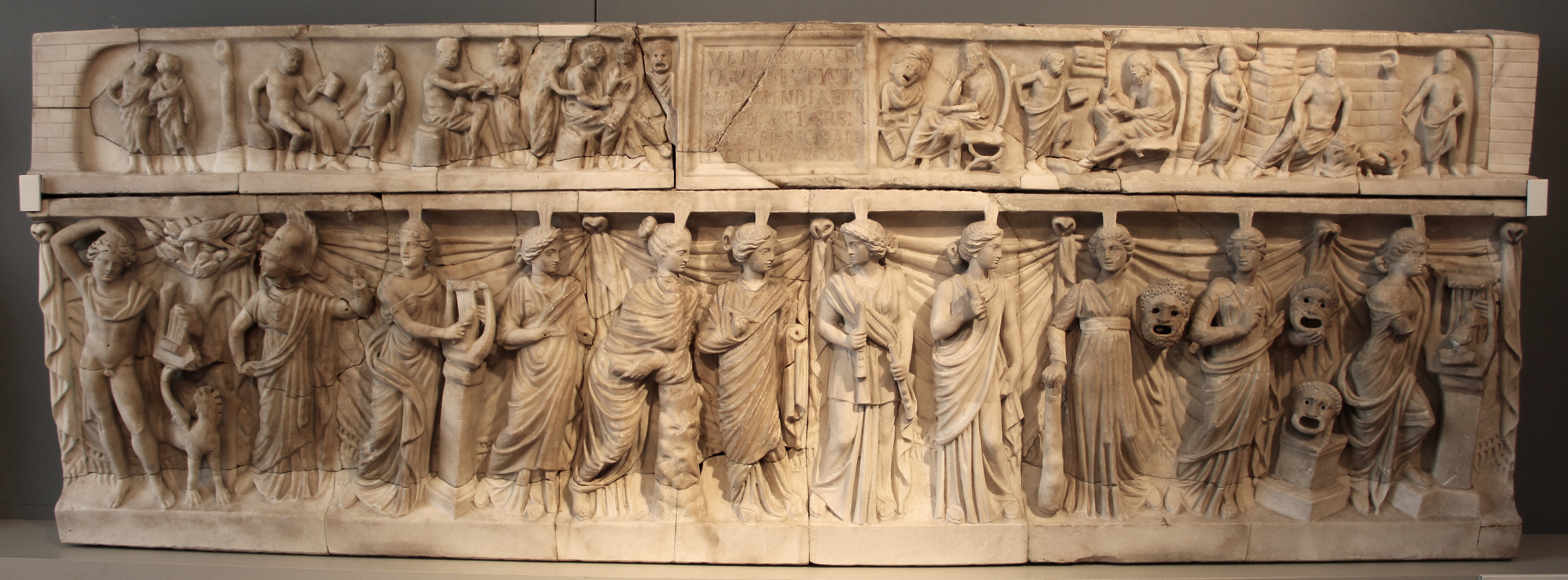
Roman sarcophagus with Apollo, Minerva and the Muses, c. 200 AD, from Via Appia, exhibited in the Antikensammlung Berlin

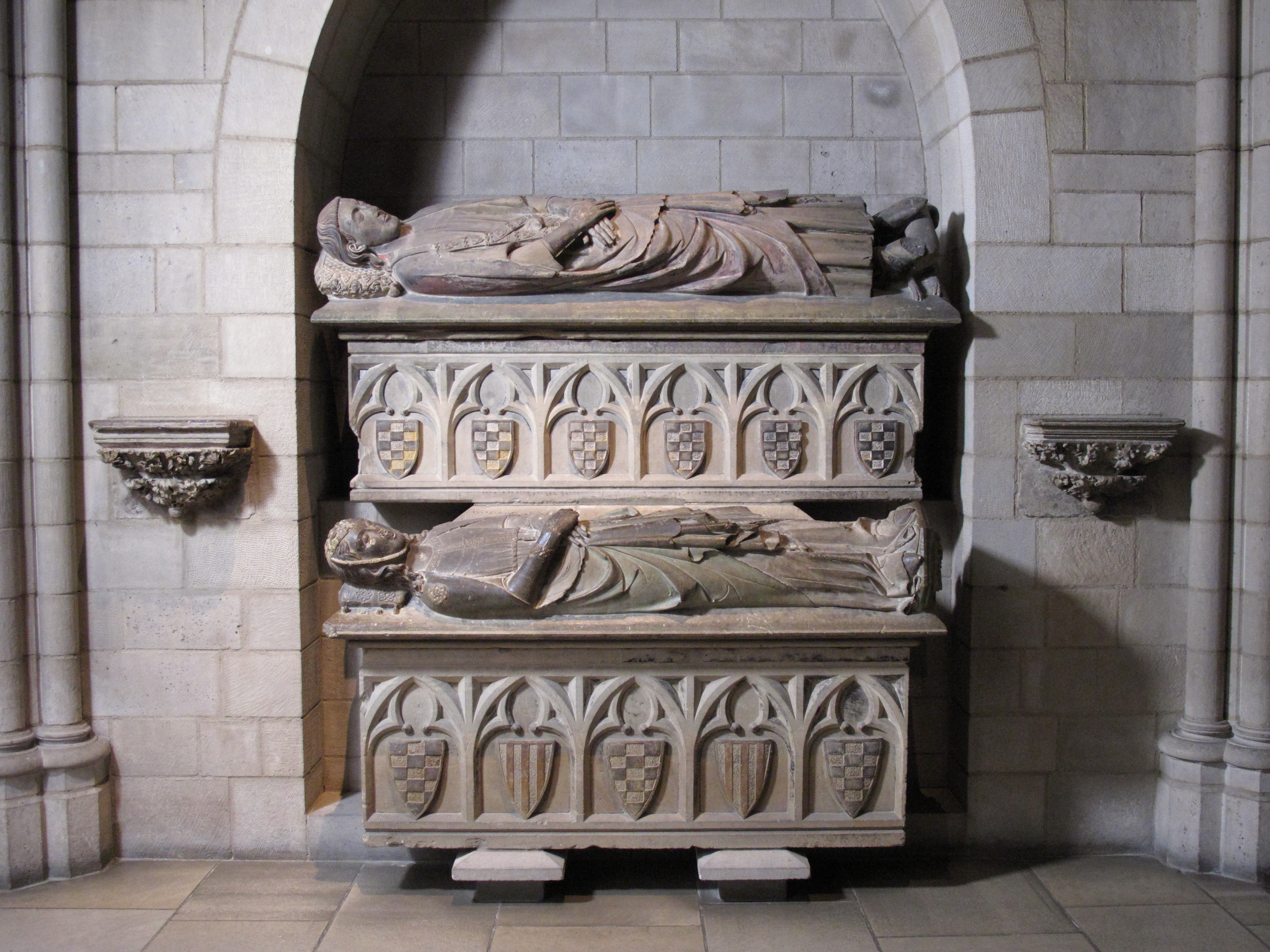
The Gothic sarcophagi of Don Àlvar Rodrigo de Cabrera, count of Urgell and his wife Cecília of Foix, c. 1300–1350, made of limestone, traces of paint, exhibited in the Metropolitan Museum of Art (New York City)

A sarcophagus (pl.: sarcophagi or sarcophaguses) is a coffin, most commonly carved in stone, and usually displayed above ground, though it may also be buried. The word sarcophagus comes from the Greek σάρξ sarx meaning "flesh", and φαγεῖν phagein meaning "to eat"; hence sarcophagus means "flesh-eating", from the phrase lithos sarkophagos (λίθος σαρκοφάγος), "flesh-eating stone". The word also came to refer to a particular kind of limestone that was thought to rapidly facilitate the decomposition of the flesh of corpses contained within it due to the chemical properties of the limestone itself.

== History of the sarcophagus ==
Sarcophagi were most often designed to remain above ground. The earliest stone sarcophagi were used by Egyptian pharaohs of the 3rd dynasty, which reigned from about 2686 to 2613 BC. "Ancient Egyptians believed in an afterlife, and the sarcophagus was to be the eternal dwelling place of those within it."

The Hagia Triada sarcophagus is a stone sarcophagus elaborately painted in fresco; one style of later Ancient Greek sarcophagus in painted pottery is seen in Klazomenian sarcophagi, produced around the Ionian Greek city of Klazomenai, where most examples were found, between 550 BC (Late Archaic) and 470 BC. They are made of coarse clay in shades of brown to pink. Added to the basin-like main sarcophagus is a broad, rectangular frame, often covered with a white slip and then painted. The huge Lycian Tomb of Payava, now in the British Museum, is a royal tomb monument of about 360 BC designed for an open-air placing, a grand example of a common Lycian style.

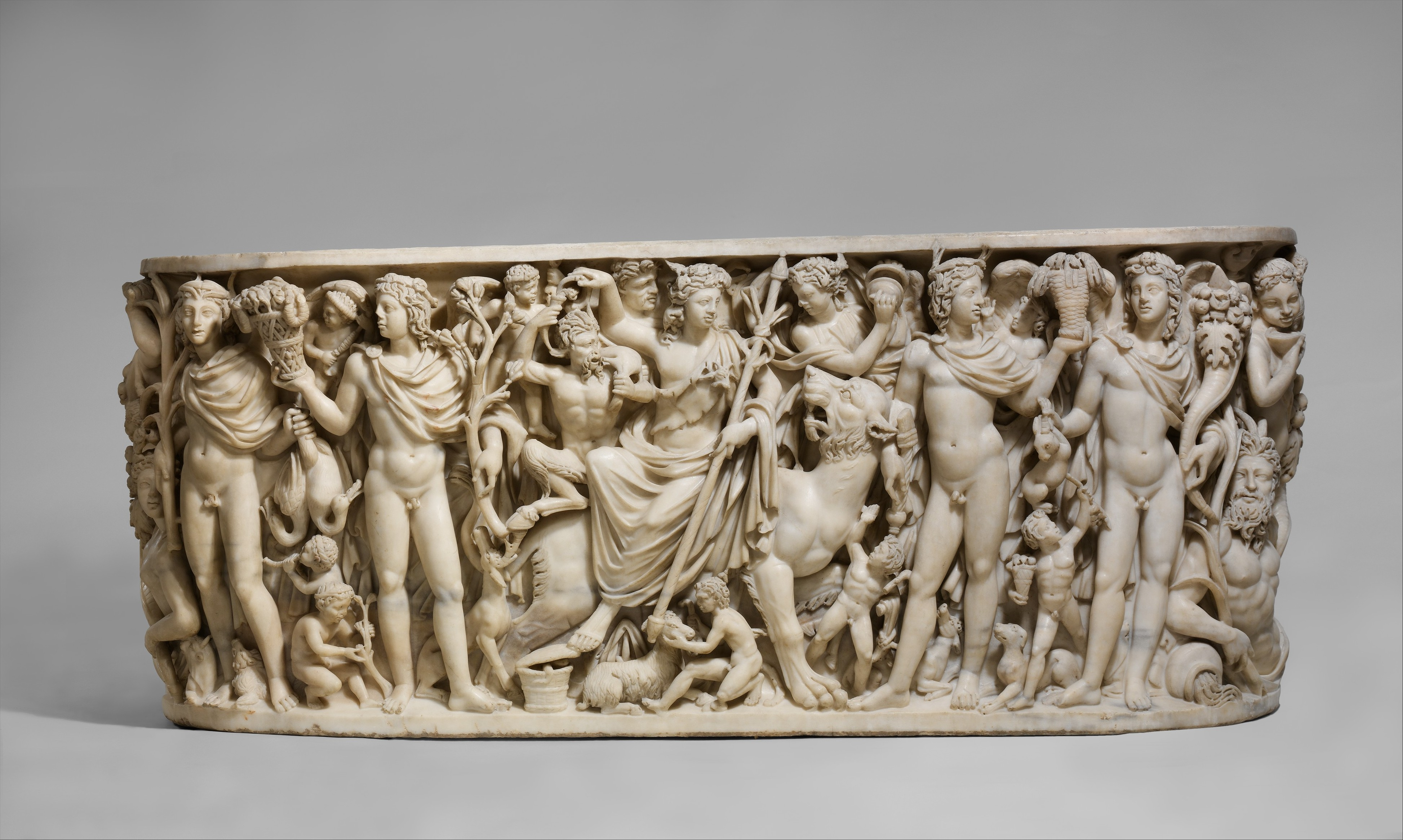
Relief on a Roman sarcophagus, which represents the triumph of Dionysos, c. 260–270 AD, marble, exhibited in the Metropolitan Museum of Art (New York City)

Ancient Roman sarcophagi—sometimes metal or plaster as well as limestone—were popular from about the reign of Trajan, and often elaborately carved, until the early Christian burial preference for interment underground, often in a limestone sepulchre, led to their falling out of favor. However, there are many important Early Christian sarcophagi from the 3rd to 4th centuries. Most Roman examples were designed to be placed against a wall and were decorated on three sides only. Sarcophagi continued to be used in Christian Europe for important figures, especially rulers and leading church figures, and by the High Middle Ages often had a recumbent tomb effigy lying on the lid. More plain sarcophagi were placed in crypts. The most famous examples include the Habsburg Imperial Crypt in Vienna, Austria. The term tends to be less often used to describe Medieval, Renaissance, and later examples.

In the early modern period, lack of space tended to make sarcophagi impractical in churches, but chest tombs or false sarcophagi, empty and usually bottomless cases placed over an underground burial, became popular in outside locations such as cemeteries and churchyards, especially in Britain in the 18th and 19th centuries, where memorials were mostly not highly decorated and the extra cost of a false sarcophagus over a headstone acted as an indication of social status.

== Asia ==
In the Mekong Delta in southwestern Vietnam, it is common for families to inter their members in sarcophagi near their homes, thus allowing ready access for visits as a part of the indigenous tradition of ancestor worship.

In Sulawesi, Indonesia, waruga are a traditional form of sarcophagus.

== India ==
Nearly 140 years after British archaeologist Alexander Rea unearthed a sarcophagus from the hillocks of Pallavaram in Tamil Nadu, an identical artifact dating back more than 2,000 years was discovered in the same locality.

== Spain ==
Phoenician and Paleochristian sarcophagi have been found in the Iberian Peninsula.

== United States ==
Several U.S. Presidents, including George Washington, James Monroe, Ulysses Grant, William McKinley, and Woodrow Wilson, were buried in above-ground sarcophagi.

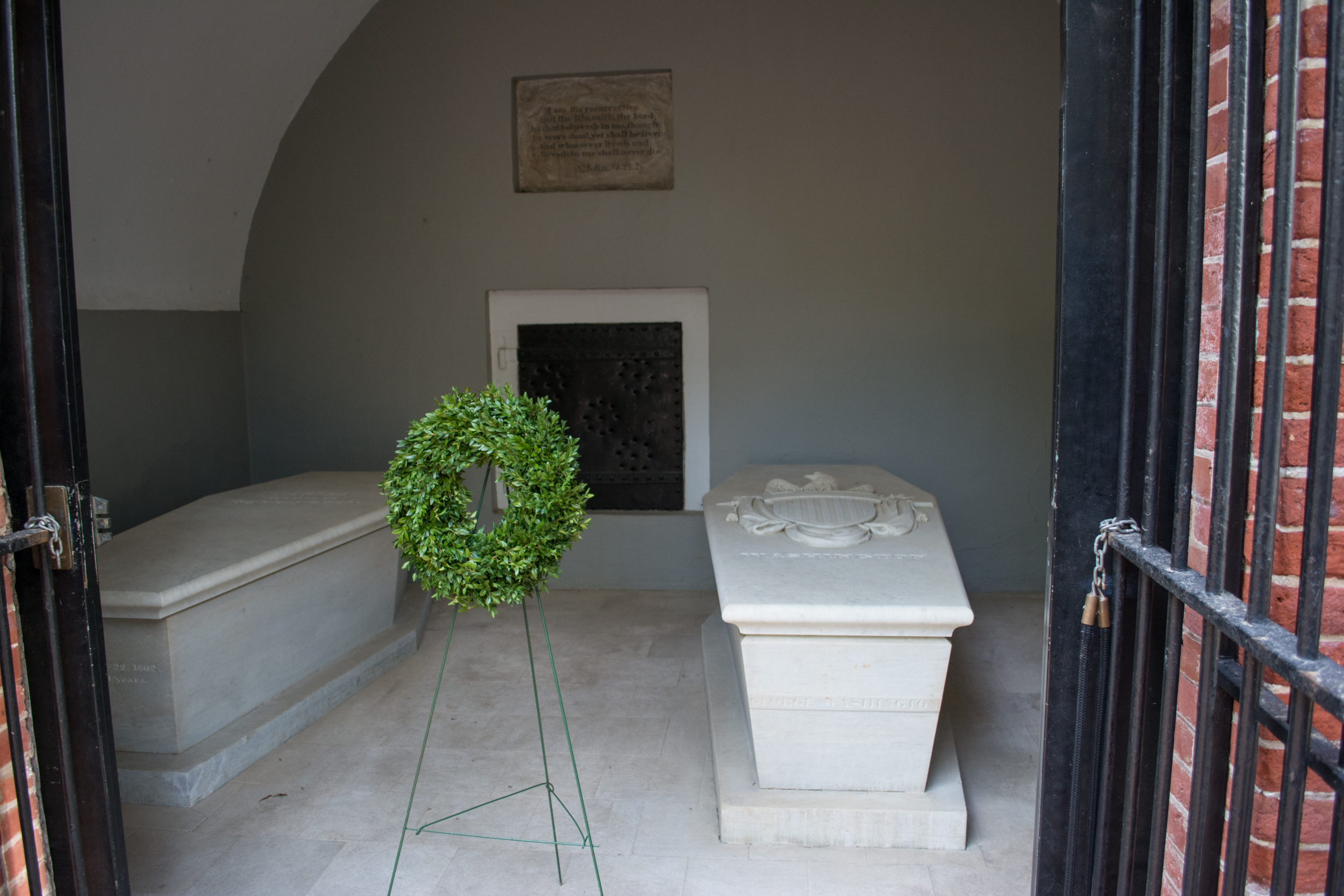
Interior of the Washington Family Tomb at Mount Vernon

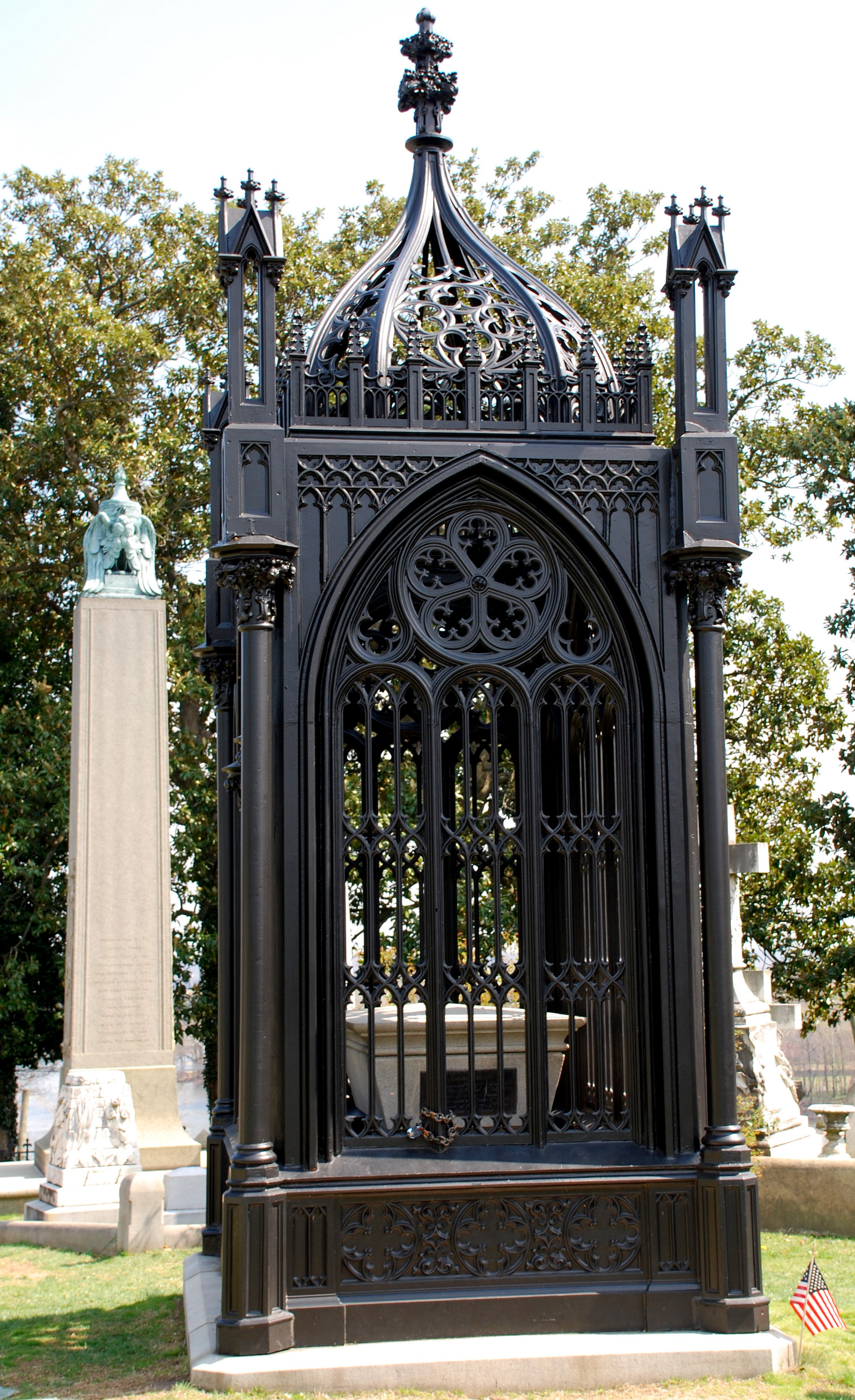
James Monroe's grave at Hollywood Cemetery (Richmond, Virginia)

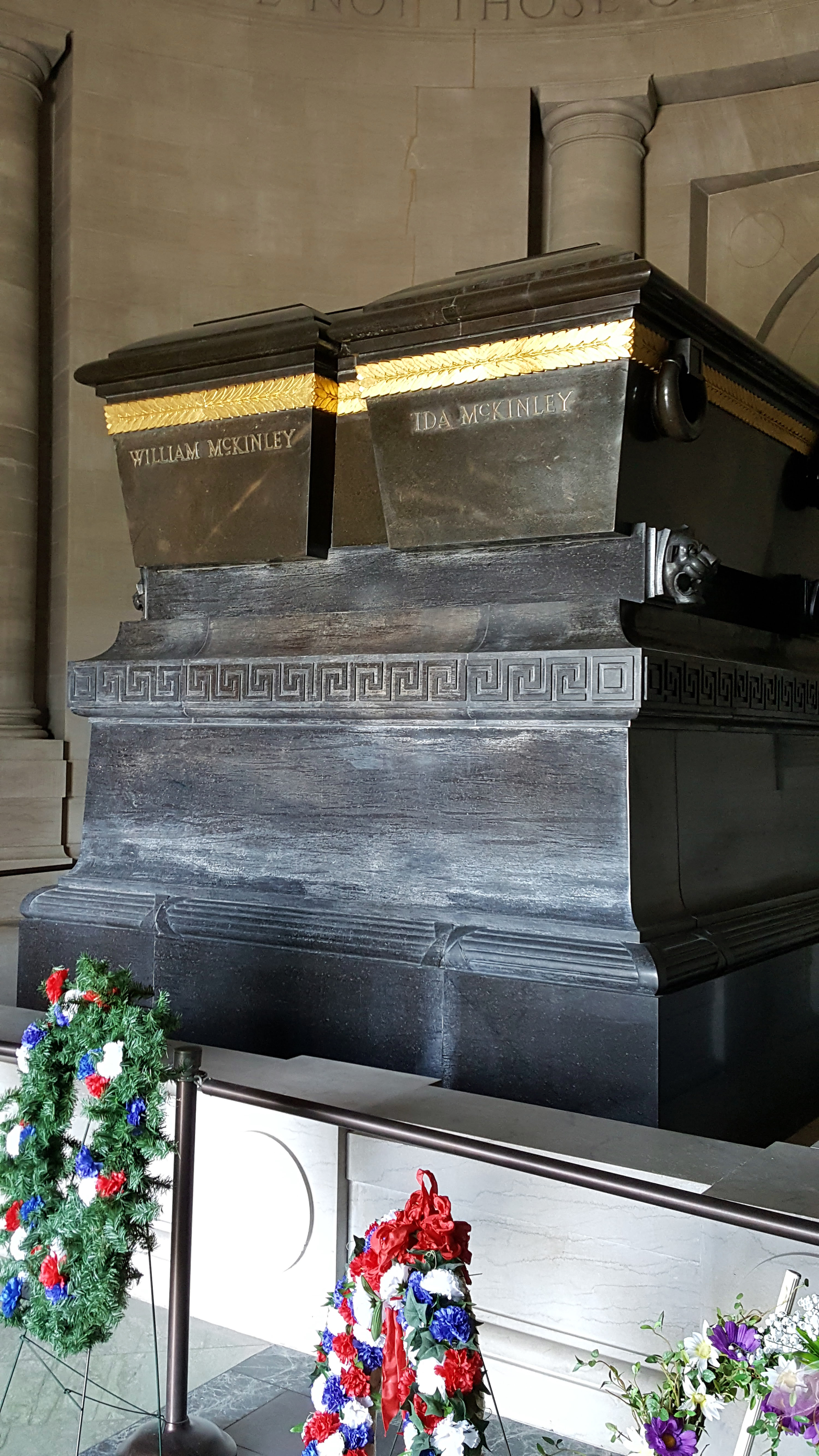
Sarcophagi of William and Ida McKinley inside the McKinley National Memorial (Canton, Ohio)

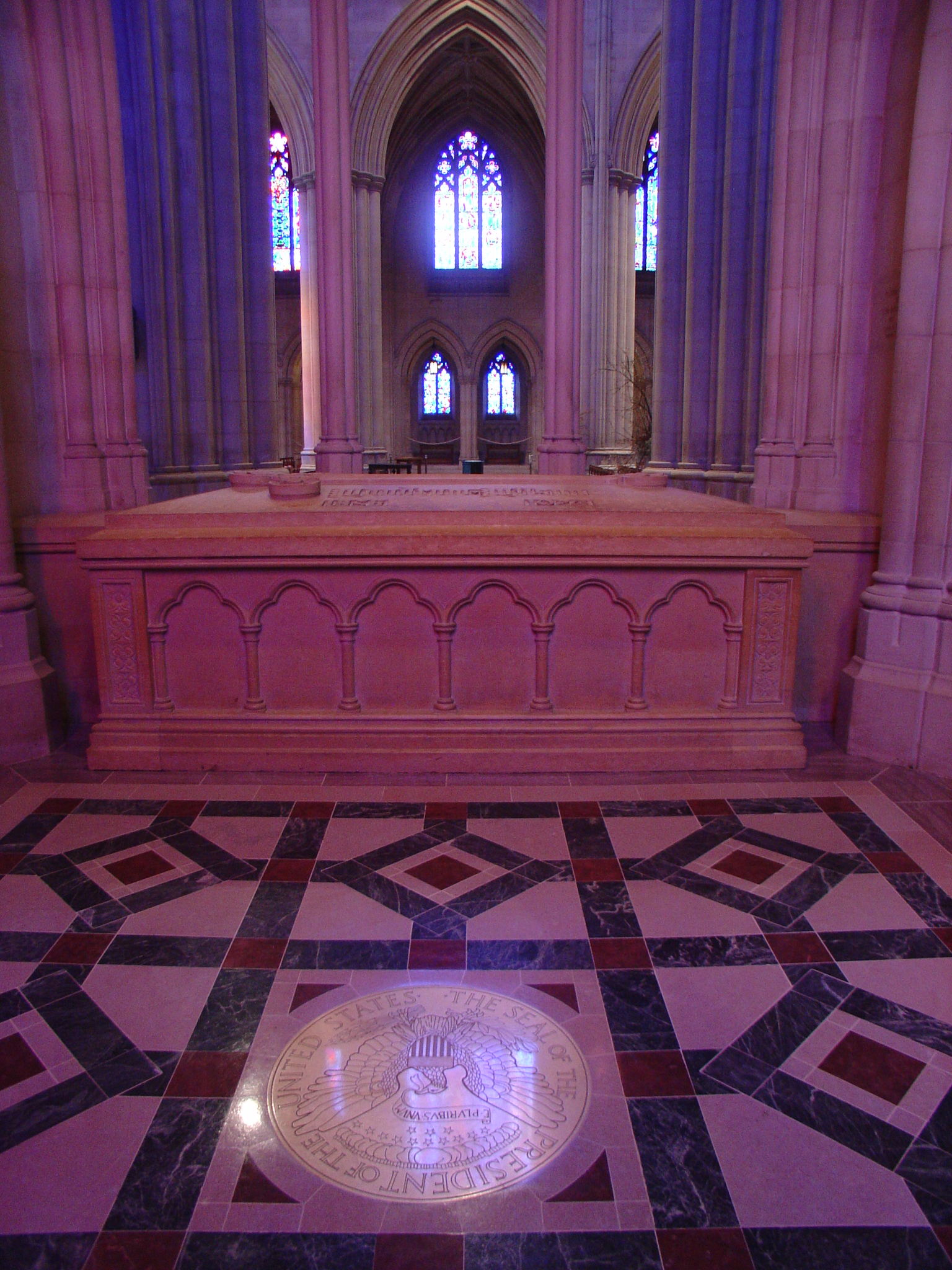
Tomb of Woodrow Wilson at the Washington National Cathedral

Sarcophagi, usually "false", made a return to the cemeteries of America during the last quarter of the 19th century, at which time, according to a New York company which built sarcophagi, "it was decidedly the most prevalent of all memorials in our cemeteries". They continued to be popular into the 1950s, at which time the popularity of flat memorials (making for easier grounds maintenance) made them obsolete. Nonetheless, a 1952 catalog from the memorial industry still included eight pages of them, broken down into Georgian and Classical detail, a Gothic and Renaissance adaptation, and a Modern variant. The image shows some sarcophagi from the late 19th century located in Laurel Hill Cemetery in Philadelphia, Pennsylvania. The one in the back, the Warner Monument created by Alexander Milne Calder (1879), features the spirit or soul of the deceased being released.

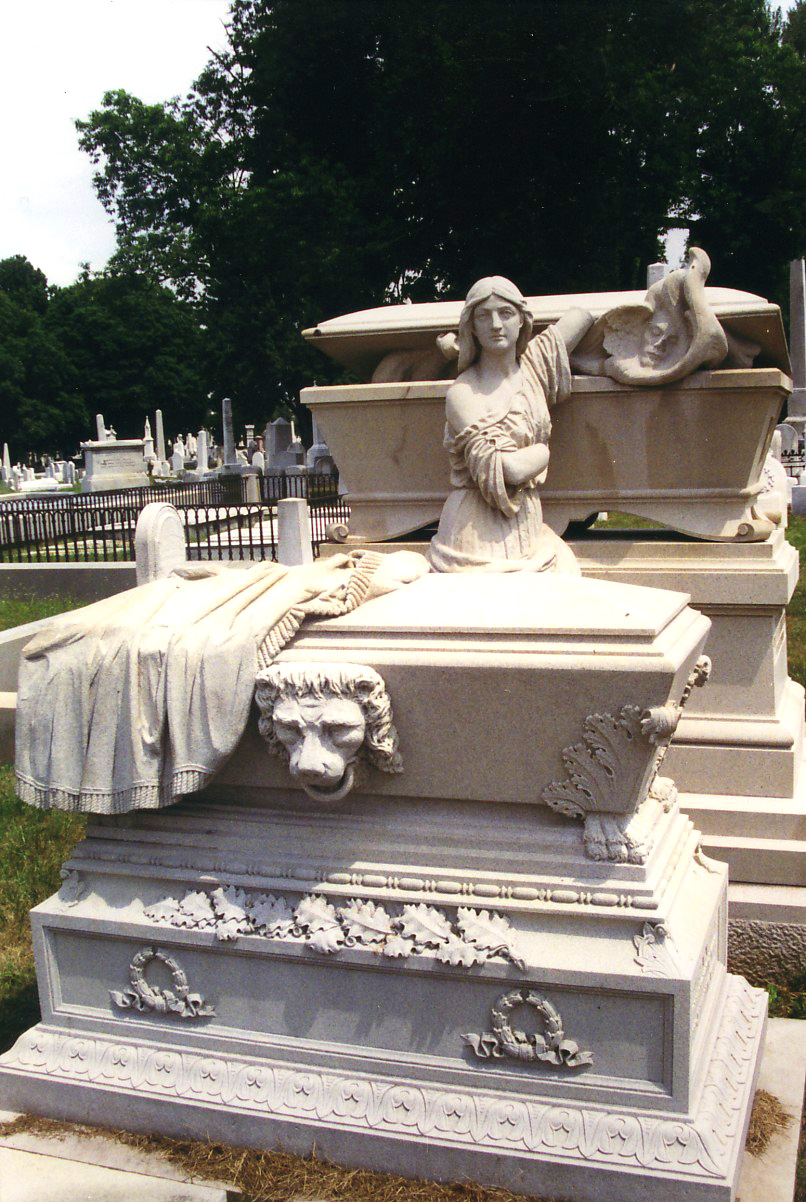
Warner Tomb in Laurel Hill Cemetery (Philadelphia, Pennsylvania)

== See also ==
- Crypt
- Mausoleum
- Ossuary
- Tomb effigy
- Ancient Egyptian coffins

== Bibliography ==
- Mont Allen, "Sarcophagus", in The Oxford Encyclopedia of Ancient Greece and Rome, edited by Michael Gagarin, vol. 6, p. 214–218 (Oxford: Oxford University Press, 2010).
- Robert Manuel Cook, Clazomenian Sarcophagi (Mainz: Philipp von Zabern, 1981).
- R. R. R. Smith, Sculptured for Eternity: Treasures of Hellenistic, Roman, and Byzantine Art from Istanbul Archaeological Museum (Istanbul: Ertuǧ and Kocabıyık, 2001).
- Paul Zanker and Björn C. Ewald, Living with Myths: The Imagery of Roman Sarcophagi (Oxford: Oxford University Press, 2012).
