= Delusion and Dream in Jensen's Gradiva =

Essay by Sigmund Freud

Delusion and Dream in Jensen's ‘Gradiva’
- The German edition
- Author: Sigmund Freud
- Original title: Der Wahn und die Träume in W. Jensens "Gradiva"
- Translator: Helen M. Downey (1917); James Strachey (1959)
- Language: German

Delusion and Dream in Jensen's ‘Gradiva’ (German: Der Wahn und die Träume in W. Jensens "Gradiva") is an essay written in 1907 by Sigmund Freud that subjects the novel Gradiva: A Pompeiian Fancy by Wilhelm Jensen, and especially its protagonist, to psychoanalysis.

The novel is about a young archaeologist, Norbert Hanold, who comes to realize his love for a childhood friend through a long and complex process, mainly by associating her with an idealized woman he has seen in a Roman bas-relief.

Freud considered the novel as providing a prime example of 'something which might be called "cure by seduction" or "cure by love"', as well as evidence 'that the Oedipus complex is still active in normal adults, too'.

== Analysis ==
An isolated, unworldly individual, Hanold has 'repressed the memory of a girl, Zoë Bertgang, with whom he has grown up and to whom he had been affectionately attached'; but is unconsciously reminded of her by 'a bas-relief depicting a young, lovely woman with a distinctive gait. He calls her "Gradiva", which means "the woman who steps along"'.

After a dream about "Gradiva" and the destruction of Pompeii, Hanold 'leaves for Pompeii, where he meets a young woman, very much alive, whom he takes for Gradiva. In the course of the meetings that follow, he organizes his mania, stalking and interpreting signs (Gradiva appears at noon, the ghost hour, and the like). "Gradiva" seeks to cure him by gradually revealing her identity to him'.

The woman is of course Hanold's childhood sweetheart, Zoë; and 'fortunately his "Gradiva" is as shrewd as she is beautiful. Zoë, the "source" of his malaise, also becomes the agent of its resolution; recognizing Hanold's delusions for what they are, she restores him to sanity, disentangling his fantasies from reality' – it 'is only Zoë who can tell him that his archeological interest is sublimated desire for her'.

With respect to 'the final paragraph, in which Jensen has Hanold asking Zoë to walk ahead of him and she complies with a smile,' Freud put, "Erotic... foot interest"... By walking ahead of him in imitation of "Gradiva" on the plaque, she finds the key to his therapy'.

== Later criticism ==
Post-Freudians vary widely on whether Hanold suffers from neurosis or psychosis, some emphasizing 'the way Freud offers psychoanalysts a model which shows "how to address the 'mad' part of our patients without neglecting the rest of their person"'.

=== Poststructuralism ===
Poststructuralist philosopher Jacques Derrida references Freud's use of Jensen's Gradiva in his own book-length essay Archive Fever: A Freudian Impression (1995).

Hélène Cixous emphasises the way 'Zoe is the one who brings to life Norbert's repressed love in a kind of feminine transfer'.

== Gradiva Awards ==
The "Gradiva Awards", given by the National Association for the Advancement of Psychoanalysis, are named after Freud's essay. They go to the best works that advance psychoanalysis.

- In 1995, Judith E. Daykin and Moss Hart each received the award.
- In 1997, the award was given to British psychotherapist Carol Jeffrey.

== See also ==
- Psychoanalytic literary criticism
