= Klazomenian vase painting =

Klazomenian vase painting (also Clazomenean vase painting) was a regional style of ancient Greek vase painting, belonging to the East Greek representations of that form of art.

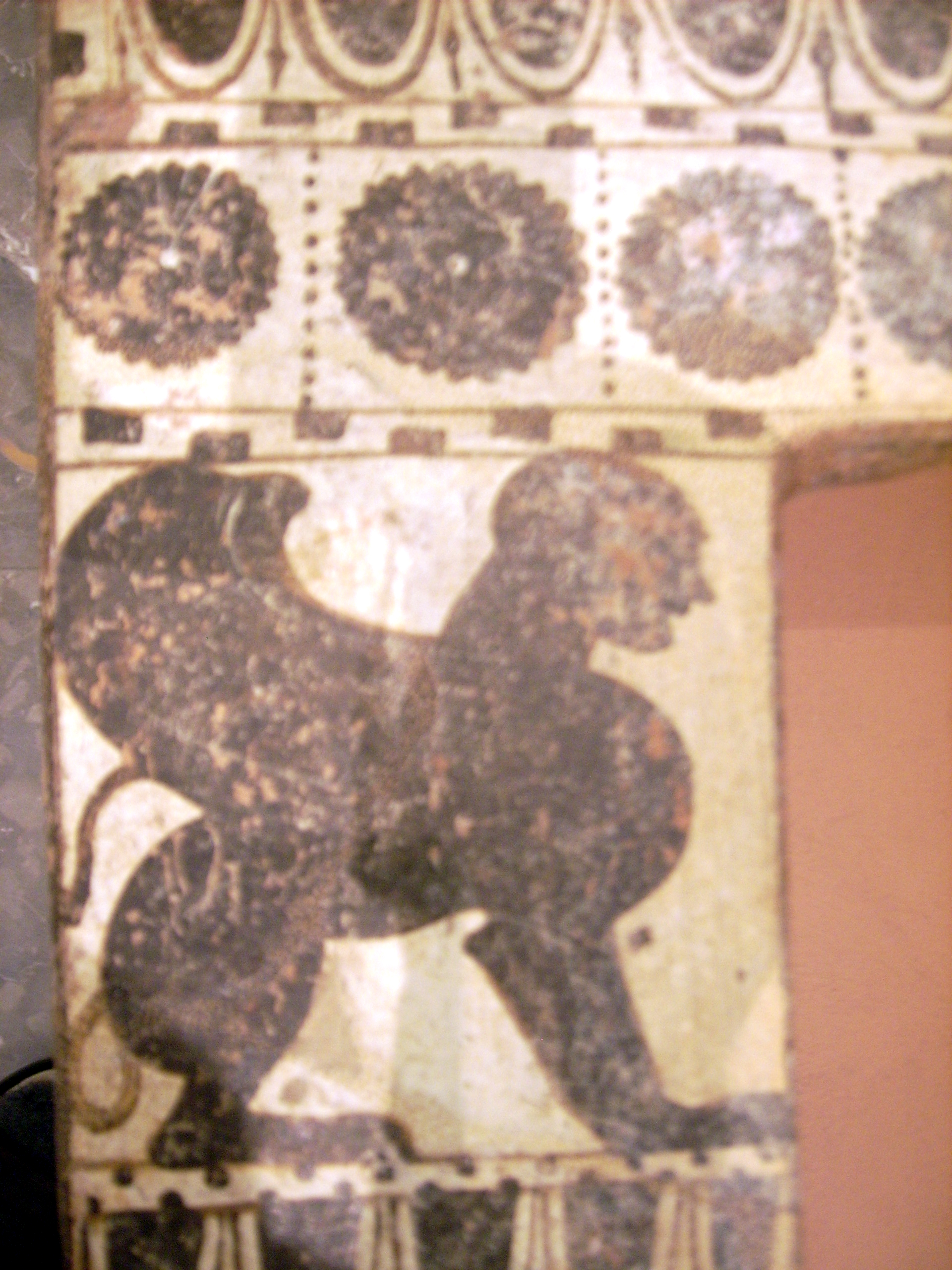
Sphinx, detail of a Klazomenian sarcophagus.

By the middle of the 6th century BC (c. 550–530 BC), the workshops of Klazomenai mainly painted amphorae and hydriai, as well as deep bowls, usually with large, rather angular figures. The vessels are not very carefully made. Popular motifs are circles of dancing women, and animals. The leading workshops were those of the Tübingen Painter, the Petrie Painter and the Urla Group.

The majority of the vases were found at Naukratis and at Tell Deffenneh, a site abandoned in 525 BC. Their origin was initially unclear, but the archaeologist was able to determine it through comparison with the imagery on the so-called Klazomenian sarcophagi. The pots were often decorated with added plastic women's masks. Mythological scenes are rare. Popular decorative motifs are scale ornaments, rows of white dots and stiff dancing figures. Singular and unusual is the depiction of a herald in front of a king and queen. Men are usually marked by massive spade-shaped beards. Since around 600 BC and until c. 520 BC, Clazomenai probably produced the rosette cup, successor shape to the East Greek bird cup.

== Bibliography ==
- Thomas Mannack: Griechische Vasenmalerei. Eine Einführung. Theiss, Stuttgart 2002, p. 81f., 90–94, 134f. ISBN 3-8062-1743-2.
- Matthias Steinhart: Schwarzfigurige Vasenmalerei II. Ausserattisch. In: Der Neue Pauly, vol. 11, cols. 276–281.
