= Paul Hartwig =

German classical archaeologist (1859–1919)

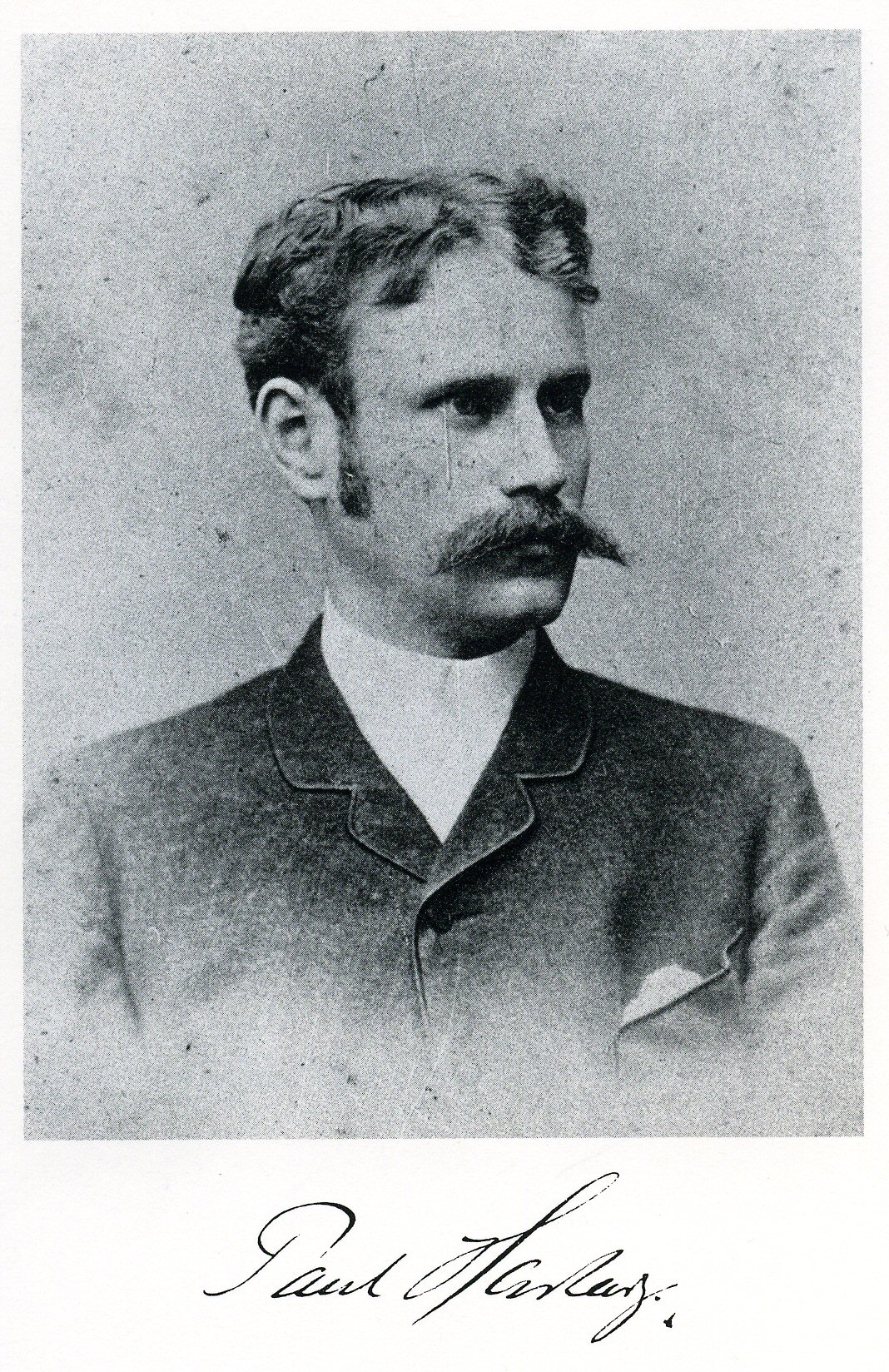
- Paul Hartwig (ca. 1885)
- Born: 18 February 1859; Pirna, Kingdom of Saxony
- Died: 3 August 1919 (aged 60); Gaschwitz, Germany
- Occupation: Archaeologist
- Known for: Study of Greek vases

Signature
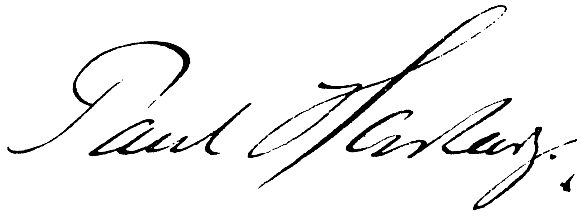

Paul Hartwig (18 February 1859, in Pirna – 3 August 1919, in Gaschwitz, near Leipzig) was a German classical archaeologist, known for his study of Greek vases.

In 1883 he received his doctorate from the University of Leipzig with the dissertation Herakles mit dem Füllhorn ("Heracles with the Cornucopia"). In 1887/88 with a travel scholarship from the German Archaeological Institute, he conducted archaeological research throughout the Mediterranean region. Afterwards, he worked at the Kunstgewerbemuseum in Berlin, and from 1892 to 1915, he lived in Rome as a collector and art dealer.

== Selected works ==
- Die griechischen Meisterschalen der Blüthezeit des strengen rothfigurigen Stiles, 1893 – Master Greek bowls from the golden age of strict red-figure style.
- Bendis: eine archaeologische Untersuchung, 1897 – Bendis: an archaeological investigation.
- Anselm Feuerbach's Medea, Lucia Brunacci, 1904 – Anselm Feuerbach's Medea, Lucia Brunacci.
- Die antiken Vasen von der Akropolis zu Athen (with Botho Graef, Paul Wolters, Robert Zahn and Ernst Langlotz, 1909–) – The ancient vases from the Acropolis at Athens.
- Vente aux enchères publiques de la collection de médailles grecques et romaines, aes grave, livres de numismatique, histoire, archéologie, etc., 1910 – Public auction of a collection of Greek and Roman medals, aes grave, books on numismatics, history, archaeology, etc., belonging to Dr. Paul Hartwig.
