= Jean Jamin =

French ethnologist and anthropologist (1945–2022)

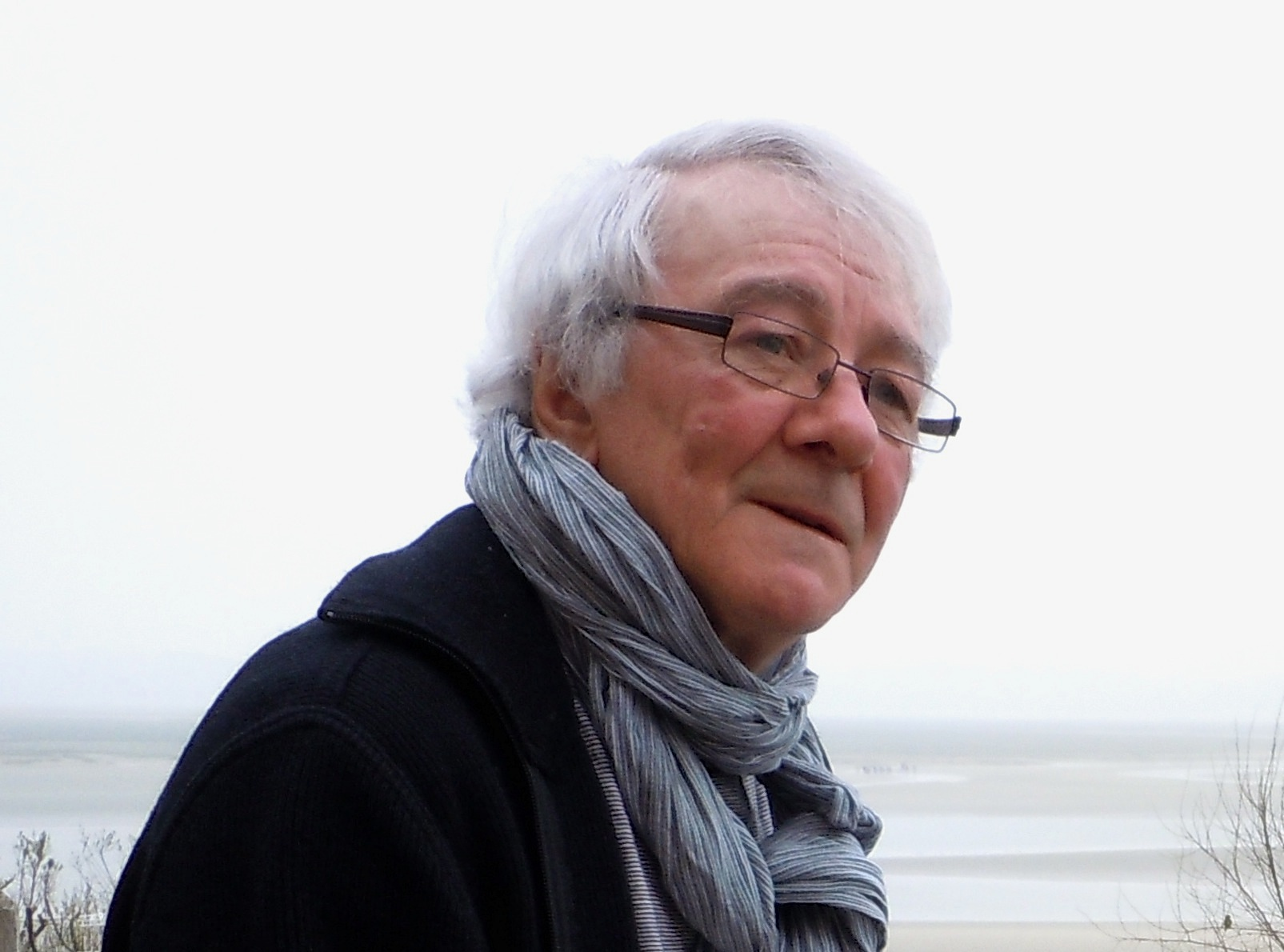
- Jamin in 2013
- Born: 26 April 1945; Charleville-Mézières, France
- Died: 21 January 2022 (aged 76); Paris, France
- Education: Paris Descartes University; School for Advanced Studies in the Social Sciences
- Occupations: Ethnologist; Anthropologist

Jean Jamin (26 April 1945 – 21 January 2022) was a French ethnologist and anthropologist. Director of studies at the School for Advanced Studies in the Social Sciences, he taught ethnology there from 1993 to 2016. He directed the journal L'Homme from 1996 to 2015 and co-founded the journal Gradhiva in 1986 alongside Michel Leiris. In the mid-1990s, he became a specialist in the study of the relationship between anthropology and literature, as well as between opera, jazz, popular music, and folk music.

== Biography ==
After studying philosophy, sociology, and ethnology at Paris Descartes University, he earned a degree in economic and social sciences from the School for Advanced Studies in the Social Sciences under the direction of Denise Paulme and Marc Augé. He began his career researching the cultural practices of "manhood" in France. He then worked in the Black Africa department at the Musée de l'Homme in Paris after a long stay in Ivory Coast. He notably participated in the exhibitions Rites de la mort (1979), Voyages et découvertes (1981), and Côté femmes. Approches ethnologiques (1986). He became one of the principal scientists at the Musée d'ethnographie de Neuchâtel in Neuchâtel thanks to Jacques Hainard.

In 1984, Jamin created the ethnology department at the Musée de l'Homme and later directed an ethnology research team at the French National Centre for Scientific Research from 1986 to 1994. In 1986, he co-founded the journal Gradhiva with Michel Leiris, later published by the Musée du Quai Branly. He also founded "Les cahiers de Gradhiva", published by Éditions Jean-Michel Place. In 1988, he became part of the editing committee of the Dictionnaire de l'ethnologie et de l'anthropologie.

In 1995, Jamin directed the film Michel Leiris ou l'homme sans honneur, part of the series Écrivains du XXe siècle broadcast on France 3. From 2001 to 2009, he led a seminar on "anthropology of jazz" at the School for Advanced Studies in the Social Sciences (EHESS) alongside Patrick Williams. He became director of studies at EHESS in 1999. In 2006, he began leading a seminar at EHESS on "General anthropology and philosophy" alongside François Flahault. In 2011, he wrote Faulkner. Le nom, le sol et le sang, which covered the life and work of William Faulkner.

In 2001, Jamin became a full member of the Laboratoire d'anthropologie et d'histoire de l'institution de la culture (LAHIC), directed by Daniel Fabre. From 2010 to 2014, he led the seminar "Popular song, poetry and myth" at EHESS.

Jamin died in Paris on 21 January 2022, at the age of 76.

== Bibliography ==
=== Books ===
- Contacts et antagonismes culturels en pays kikuyu (Kenya) (1973)
- Les Lois du silence. Essai sur la fonction sociale du secret (1977)
- Aux origines de l'anthropologie française. Les Mémoires de la Société des observateurs de l'Homme en l'an VIII (1978)
- La Tenderie aux grives chez les Ardennais du plateau (1979)
- Exotismus und Dichtung (1982)
- Une anthropologie du jazz (2010)
- Faulkner. Le nom, le sol et le sang (2011)
- Une anthropologie du jazz (2013)
- Le Cercueil de Queequeg. Mission Dakar-Djibouti, mai 1931-février 1933 (2014)
- Littérature et anthropologie (2018)
- Tableaux d'une exposition. Chronique d'une famille ouvrière ardennaise sous la IIIe République (2021)

=== Filmography, videography, radiography ===
- Tips für Lesser « Phantom Afrika » (1984)
- La Tenderie aux grives en Ardennes (1985)
- Pages arrachées au Journal de Michel Leiris (1992)
- Michel Leiris ou L'Homme sans honneur (1995)
- Génie nègre. Visions de La Création du Monde selon Blaise Cendrars, Fernand Léger et Darius Milhaud (2008)
- Le Nom, le sol et le sang. Pour une anthropologie de William Faulkner (2010)
