= Gradiva (novel) =

1903 novel by Wilhelm Jensen

Gradiva: A Pompeiian Fancy
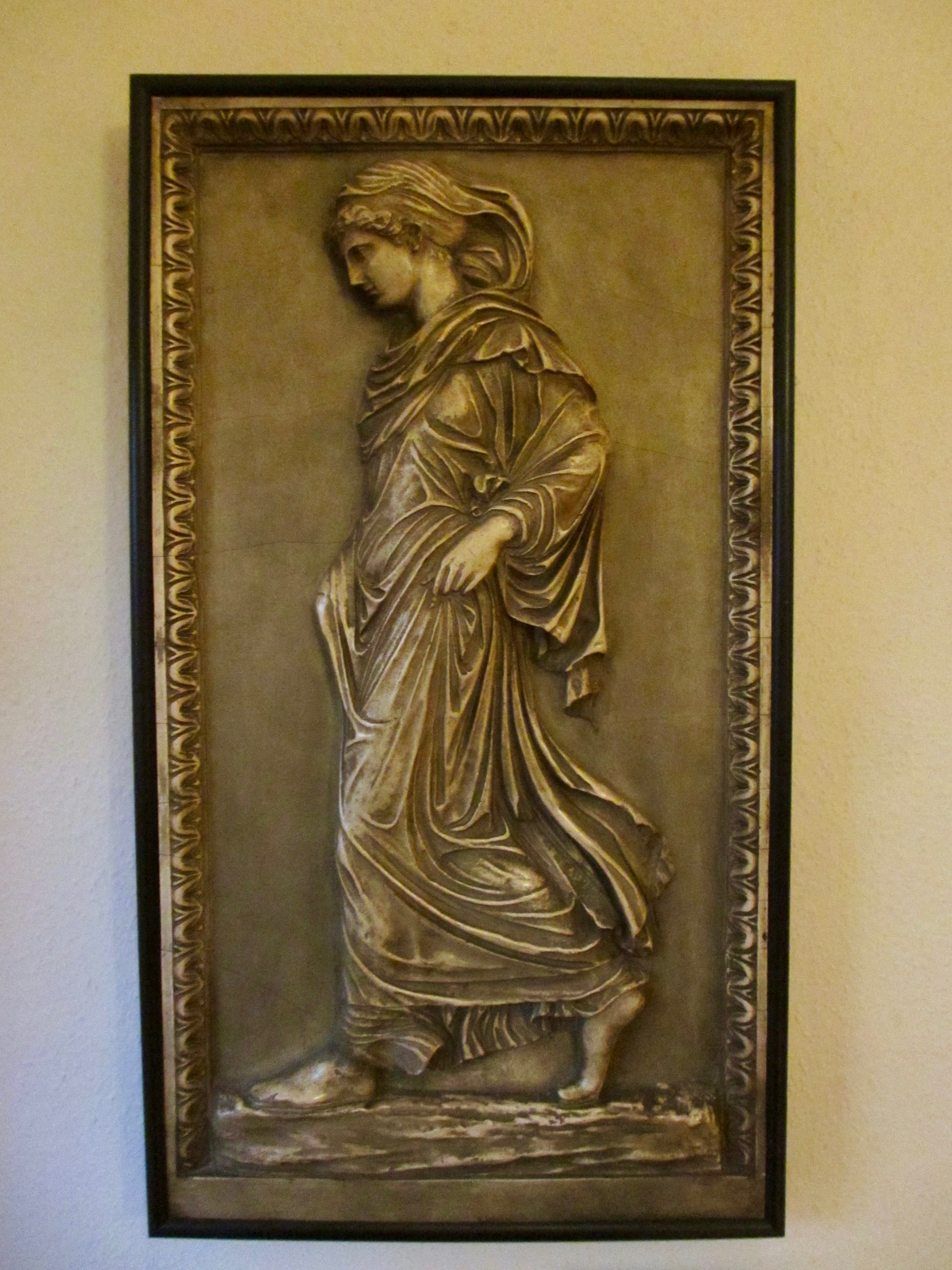
- Gradiva: Cast of a work in the Vatican museum, which inspired the fictional character. (Freud Museum, London.)
- Author: Wilhelm Jensen
- Original title: Gradiva: Ein pompejanisches Phantasiestück
- Translator: Helen M. Downey
- Language: German
- Genre: Romance, novella
- Publisher: Carl Reissner (Germany); Moffat, Yard & Co. (U.S.); George Allen & Unwin (U.K.)
- Publication date: 1903
- Publication place: Germany
- English publication date: 1917
- Media type: Print
- OCLC: 7305023

Gradiva: A Pompeiian Fancy is a novella by Wilhelm Jensen, first published in instalments from June 1 to July 20, 1902, in the Viennese newspaper Neue Freie Presse, and as a book in 1903. It was inspired by a Roman bas-relief and became the basis for Sigmund Freud's famous 1907 study Delusion and Dream in Jensen's Gradiva, and translated into English in 1917 as an appendix to Freud’s study. The psychoanalytic study popularized the novella, and the fantasy-image described by Jensen, based on the Roman sculpture, then became a prominent subject in Surrealist art.

== Plot synopsis ==
The story is about an archaeologist named Norbert Hanold who is obsessed with a woman depicted in a bas-relief that he sees in a museum in Rome. He names her Gradiva, Latin for "she who steps along". After his return to Germany, he manages to get a plaster-cast of the relief, which he hangs on a wall in his work-room and contemplates daily. He comes to feel that her calm, quiet manner does not belong in bustling, cosmopolitan Rome, but rather in some smaller city, and one day an image comes to him of the girl in the relief walking on the peculiar stepping-stones that cross the streets in Pompeii. Soon afterwards, Hanold dreams that he has been transported back in time to meet the girl whose unusual gait so captivates him. He sees her walking in the streets of Pompeii while the hot ashes of Vesuvius subsume the city in 79 AD.

This fantastical dream leads Hanold on a real journey to Rome, Naples, and ultimately Pompeii, where, amazingly, he sees the Gradiva of his bas-relief stepping calmly and buoyantly across the lava stepping-stones. He follows her, loses her, then finds her sitting on the low steps between two pillars. He greets her in Greek and then in Latin, only to be answered, "If you wish to speak with me, you must do so in German." When he addresses her as if she were the girl of his dream, however, she looks at him without comprehension, gets up and leaves. Hanold calls out after her, "Are you coming here again tomorrow in the noon hour?" But she does not turn round, gives no answer, and a few moments later disappears round the corner. Hanold hurries after her, but she is nowhere to be seen. What follows is his quest to determine whether the woman he has seen is real or a delusion.

== Psychoanalytic interpretation ==
Early after Gradiva’s publication, psychoanalyst Wilhelm Stekel recommended the novella to his colleague Sigmund Freud, and later Carl Jung renewed his interest into it. Freud found the narrative compelling, and published his influential essay titled Delusion and Dream in Jensen's Gradiva (German: "Der Wahn und die Träume in W. Jensen's Gradiva") in 1907. Afterwards, he exchanged a few letters with Jensen, who was "flattered by Freud's analysis of his story".

Freud's analysis is one of his first analyses of a literary work. His essay saved the novella from obscurity and made Gradiva into a modern mythological figure.

After publishing his essay, Freud joyfully beheld the original sculpture in the Vatican Museums in 1907, and he acquired a plaster cast of it, which he hung in his consulting room. It can now be seen on the wall of his study (the room where he died) in 20 Maresfield Gardens, London – now the Freud Museum.

Freud corresponded with Jensen, and their letters have recently been published in English.

== Films ==
In 1970, the Italian actor and filmmaker Giorgio Albertazzi released a film titled Gradiva, based on Jensen's novel and featuring Laura Antonelli as Gradiva. Albertazzi is best known for his portrayal of the male protagonist in Last Year at Marienbad, written by Alain Robbe-Grillet, who would himself go on to direct a film based on Jensen's novel in 2002.

In 2006, the French writer and filmmaker Alain Robbe-Grillet released a film titled Gradiva (C'est Gradiva Qui Vous Appelle) ("It's Gradiva Who is Calling You"), which was roughly based on the novel, although updated to more recent times. It begins with an English art historian who is doing research in Morocco on the paintings and drawings that French artist Eugène Delacroix (1798–1863) produced over a century before, when he travelled to the country as part of a diplomatic mission. Spotting a beautiful, mysterious blonde woman (Gradiva) in flowing robes, dashing through the back alleys of Marrakesh, he becomes consumed with the need to track her down.

Marine Atlan’s French-Italian 2026 coming-of-age drama La Gradiva was inspired by her reading Jensen’s novella.
