= Wilhelm Jensen =

German writer (1837–1911)

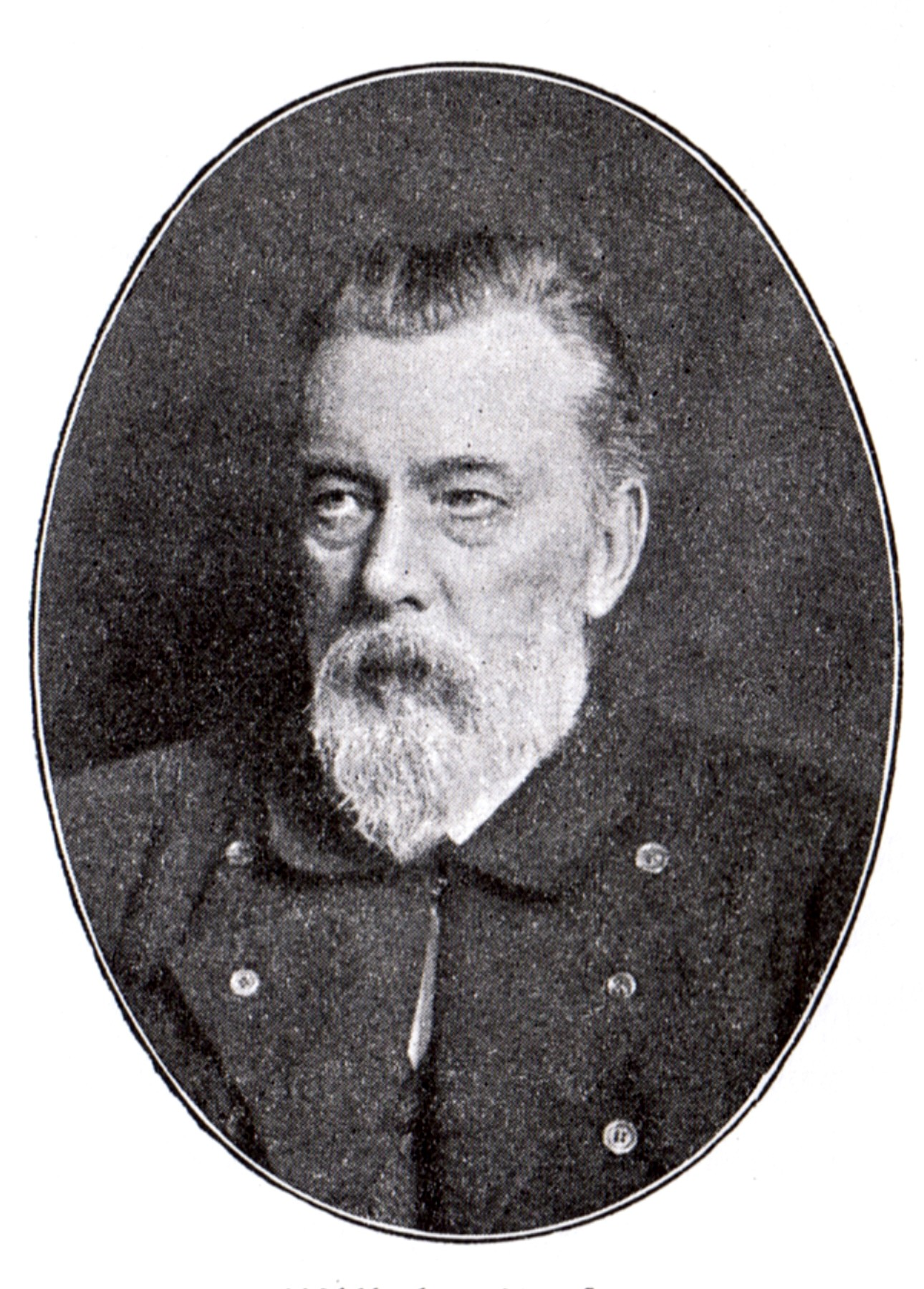
- Born: 15 February 1837; Heiligenhafen, Holstein, German Confederation
- Died: 24 November 1911 (aged 74); Munich, German Empire
- Occupations: writer, poet
- Notable work: Gradiva
- Spouse: Marie Brühl (m. 1865)
- Children: 6, among which Katharina, who married Ernst, Prince of Saxe-Meiningen.

Wilhelm Hermann Jensen (15 February 1837 – 24 November 1911) was a German writer and poet.

== Biography ==
Wilhelm Jensen was born at Heiligenhafen in the Duchy of Holstein (now Germany), the illegitimate son of Swenn Hans Jensen (1795–1855), the Mayor of the city of Kiel, later administrator (Landvogt) of the German/Danish island of Sylt, who came of old patrician Frisian stock. Wilhelm married Marie Brühl in May 1865 in Vienna and they had six children together. Jensen was the son-in-law of the journalist and writer Johann August Moritz Bruehl (1819–1877), the father-in-law of the historian and editor Eduard Heyck, botanist Carl Christian Mez and Ernst, Prince of Saxe-Meiningen, the grandfather of the writer and poet Hans Heyck and the step grandfather to psychologist Narziß Ach.

After attending the classical schools at Kiel and Lübeck, Jensen studied medicine at the universities of Kiel, Würzburg, Jena and Breslau. He, however, abandoned the medical profession for that of writing, and after engaging for some years in individual private study proceeded to Munich, where he associated with men of letters. After a residence in Stuttgart (1865–1869), where for a short time he conducted the Schwabische Volkszeitung and became the lifelong friend of the writer Wilhelm Raabe, he became editor in Flensburg of the Norddeutsche Zeitung. In 1872 he again returned to Kiel, lived from 1876 to 1888 in Freiburg im Breisgau, and from 1888 until his death was a resident of Munich and St. Salvator near Prien on Lake Chiemsee.

== Literary works ==
Jensen was a prolific German writer of fiction, publishing more than one hundred and fifty works, but only comparatively few of them became popular, such as the novels, Karin von Schweden (Berlin, 1878); Die braune Erica (Berlin, 1868); and the tale, Die Pfeifer von Dusenbach, Eine Geschichte aus dem Elsass (1884). Others included: Barthenia (Berlin, 1877); Götz und Gisela (Berlin, 1886); Heimkunft (Dresden, 1894); Aus See und Sand (Dresden, 1897); Luv und Lee (Berlin, 1897); and the narratives, Aus den Tagen der Hansa (Leipzig, 1885); Aus stiller Zeit (Berlin, 1881–1885); and Heimat. Jensen also published some tragedies, among them Dido (Berlin, 1870) and Der Kampf fürs Reich (Freiburg im Br., 1884). He was also a poet; a collection of his poetry is contained in "Vom Morgen zum Abend" (1897). His output continued until the year of his death, with Fremdlinge under den Menschen.

Jensen is now remembered mainly as the author of the novella Gradiva. Sigmund Freud published an analysis of this work during 1907.
