= List of French films of 2005 =

A list of films produced in France in 2005.

Title	Director	Cast	Genre	Notes
Anatomy of Hell	Catherine Breillat	Amira Casar	Drama	Jury Award, Philadelphia Film Festival
The Beat That My Heart Skipped	Jacques Audiard	Romain Duris	Crime drama	Won BAFTA, +12 wins, +7 nominations
C'est pas tout à fait la vie dont j'avais rêvé	Michel Piccoli	Roger Jendly	Drama	Screened at the 2005 Cannes Film Festival
Le Couperet	Costa-Gavras	José Garcia, Karin Viard	Crime comedy	1 win & 3 nominations
The Demon Stirs	Marie-Pascale Osterrieth	Michèle Bernier, Simon Abkarian, Claudia Cardinale	Comedy	
L'Enfant	Jean-Pierre and Luc Dardenne	Jérémie Renier, Déborah François, Jérémie Segard	Drama	11 wins, including the Palme d'Or at Cannes & 12 nominations
Le filmeur	Alain Cavalier	Christian Boltanski	Drama	Screened at the 2005 Cannes Film Festival
Gabrielle	Patrice Chéreau	Isabelle Huppert, Pascal Greggory	Romantic drama	Nominated for Golden Lion, +2 wins, +4 nom.
How Much Do You Love Me?	Bertrand Blier	Monica Bellucci, Bernard Campan	Romantic comedy	Entered into the 28th Moscow International Film Festival
Joyeux Noël	Christian Carion	Benno Fürmann, Guillaume Canet, Gary Lewis	War drama	Co-produced with Germany & UK
Kirikou and the Wild Beasts	Bénédicte Galup, Michel Ocelot	Pierre-Ndoff Sarr	Fantasy	
Lemming	Dominik Moll	André Dussollier, Charlotte Rampling	Thriller	Entered into the 2005 Cannes Film Festival
March of the Penguins	Luc Jacquet		Documentary	Won Oscar, +10 wins, +10 nominations
Memoirs of a Geisha	Rob Marshall	Zhang Ziyi, Ken Watanabe, Michelle Yeoh, Kōji Yakusho, Youki Kudoh, Kaori Momoi, Gong Li	Epic period drama	
The Moustache	Emmanuel Carrère	Vincent Lindon	Mystery drama	2 wins
Munich	Steven Spielberg	Eric Bana, Daniel Craig, Ciarán Hinds, Mathieu Kassovitz, Hanns Zischler, Geoffrey Rush	Epic historical drama	
Nanny McPhee	Kirk Jones	Emma Thompson, Colin Firth, Angela Lansbury	comedy drama fantasy	American-British-French co-production
The Perfume of the Lady in Black	Bruno Podalydès	Denis Podalydès, Sabine Azéma, Zabou Breitman	Mystery	
Le Petit Lieutenant	Xavier Beauvois	Nathalie Baye	Crime drama	2 wins & 5 nominations
Regular Lovers	Philippe Garrel	Louis Garrel, Clotilde Hesme	romantic drama	
Russian Dolls	Cédric Klapisch	Romain Duris, Kelly Reilly	Comedy drama	1 win & 2 nominations
Ruzz and Ben (Ruzz et Ben)	Philippe Jullien		Animated short	Canadian-French coproduction
Le Temps qui reste	François Ozon	Melvil Poupaud	Drama	2 wins & 1 nomination
To Paint or Make Love	Arnaud Larrieu, Jean-Marie Larrieu	Sabine Azéma, Daniel Auteuil	Comedy	1 nomination
Vendredi ou un autre jour	Yvan Le Moine	Philippe Nahon, Alain Moraïda, Ornella Muti, Hanna Schygulla	Adventure	2 Awards
A Very Long Engagement	Jean-Pierre Jeunet	Audrey Tautou, Gaspard Ulliel	Romantic war	Nominated for 2 Oscars. Another 16 wins and 21 nominations
Zim and Co.	Pierre Jolivet	Adrien Jolivet		Screened at the 2005 Cannes Film Festival
