= LGBTQ people in Japan =

The Western term “queer,” an umbrella term for lesbian, gay, bisexual, and transgender (LGBT) represents a change in thought pertaining to gender and sexuality in contemporary Japan.

== Japanese definitions of gender and sexuality ==
In Japan, gender and sexuality are conceptualized through a spectrum wherein the various social roles of the “all encompassing” group are emphasized. Under this construction, expressions of gender and sexuality are varied, as is evidenced by Japan's gender-bending communities.

The concept of transgender originates from Edo period (1603–1868) in Japan. Actresses were forbidden to perform in the kabuki theatre considering the gender inequality and social hierarchy. Male actors are playing all male and female characters within the play, as they will dress up like women. These actors kept their attire both inside and outside the theatre. At the time, it was generally believed that only men could truly know what a woman looked like. People who behaved like a woman would be assumed to socialise as one. The latter is a result of how Japan conceptualized gender and sexuality in terms of adopted social roles. As Japan becomes more westernized there is a growing concern for the treatment of the sexual and gender minorities.

With the introduction of Buddhism, one of the earliest forms of non-heterosexuality documented in Japan is found in young male homosexual practices during the Heian period (794–1185). Buddhism came to Japan from China by way of Korea during the Asuka period. Because Buddhist monks lived on steep mountains isolated within their own societies, they developed their own sexual customs. Young boys (age 11 to 17) called “Chigo” served the monks sexually because female relationships were strictly forbidden.

In modern Japan, it is not uncommon to hear Western terms such as gay and lesbian (ゲイ gei and レズビアン rezubian). Such terms differ significantly from terms used in the past and thus show a westernizing trend. Before western contact, Japan did not have a system of identification in which one's identity was determined by one's biological sexual preference. In fact, “the tripartite taxonomy of sexual types that has resulted from the social construction [homo-, bi-, heterosexuality-], held no currency in Japan.” However, this does not indicate that sexual behaviors between individuals of the same sex were not practiced. In fact, such behavior was so common in Japan that documentation of same sex relationships dates back over a thousand years.

During the Edo period, for instance, male-female sexual relations were important to secure offspring and social status; however, male-male sexual relations, particularly amongst the Samurai, were viewed as an intricate part of male socialization. The term wakashudo or shudo, literally translated as “the way of the young men,” observing an earlier form of homosexuality that focused on the sexual relationship between a Samurai and his pupil. Such relationships established an unquestionable acceptance of same-sex practices and were not restricted to men.

Women also engaged in bisexual practices although these practices are not as well documented as those of men. During the 16th century, medieval women gained new-found security as wives within virilocal systems, in contrast to the insecurity of Heian-period wives in uxorilocal and wifevisiting arrangements where women were easily abandoned by their spouses. This change was significant because it allowed women to establish more prominent positions within the household through which they were able to exert more influence. In turn, this allowed a kind of sexual liberation for many women.

Modern Japan following post-World War II does not paint the same picture of gender fluidity. Specifically, scholars in the social sciences tend to agree that gender roles are more restrictive than ever. To name one example, sexual reassignment surgery in Japan requires the applicant to be medically diagnosed with gender identity disorder in order to be accepted by a state-sanctioned clinic. However, scholars argue that this prerequisite is meant as an intentional enforcement of binary gender roles, rather than a symbol of sexual tolerance.

== Modern Japanese LGBT life ==
Dating back to the Edo Period (1603–1867), various literary and artistic depictions of sexual acts between men and young boys exist. Homosexuality in the western sense began during the Meiji period (1868–1912) and later in the Taishō period (1912–1925). In the Meiji period, same-sex practices were considered personal preferences. However, documentation and case studies only go back to the 1900s, leaving little room for analysts to distinguish homosexuality as an ‘obscene sexuality.’

In 1975, twelve women became the first group of women in Japan to publicly identify as lesbians, publishing one issue of a magazine called Subarashi Onna (Wonderful Women).

In the 1980s in Tokyo, a group of lesbians who spoke English began to form, and in 1985 they started having in-person gatherings called uiikuendo ("weekends") as part of the International Feminists of Japan conference. OCCUR was established in 1986.

Mark McLelland's article states how far the society has dealing with homosexual people in Japan, as "The Social Situation Facing Gays in Japan" presents a well rounded discussion on how the society reacts to homosexual people. It discusses the social structure of Japanese society and how well it accommodates the sexual minority. For instance, the sexual minority has now become a very important part of the Human Rights policies constructed by the “Tokyo City Human Rights Policy Directive Manual released in 2000”. Gay people were originally dropped during the first draft of the policy, but after facing pressure from the public, Non-Governmental Organizations (NGOs) and queer activist groups, the council eventually pledged to safeguard the human rights of gay people.

Japanese society's view of LGBT and sexual minorities has shifted due to the rapid westernization in postwar period. Consequently, lesbian, gay, bisexual and gender variant identity and behavior have since come to be seen as aberrant or "diseased". In more recent times, however, with the influences of LGBT magazines, research, interviews, case studies, auto-biographies, journals and activism, more people have a relatively accepting and respectful attitude towards lesbian, gay, bisexual and transgender individuals. The availability of literature, information and formal representation of queer voices has helped many young Japanese to identify themselves with sexual minority groups. More importantly, awareness has opened a mode of communication between mainstream Japanese society and LGBT people in Japan.

In the modern world, Japanese LGBT people are facing difficulties such as societal prejudice or discrimination. Often men in contemporary Japanese society express their sexual attraction for other men with a low self-esteem and a lack of self-confidence. The extensive information on queer life-styles has helped to change this and now gay people are more comfortable with their sexual orientation. In 2017, Japan became the first country in the world to elect an openly transgender man to a public office when Tomoya Hosoda was elected as a councillor for the city of Iruma.

Many LGBT people are aware of the negative perception that much of Japanese society has about LGBT lifestyles. University students who openly discuss their problems with fellow students categorize themselves as ‘straight’ to avoid uncomfortable situations when seeking employment. McLelland's article talks about how gay men in the provincial areas face oppressive and condescending remarks. While awareness amongst Japanese society has helped queer people to express their identities, societal restrictions prevent queer people from living freely and contently in regards to employment and public accommodations. Furthermore, the lack of clinical psychologists versed in understanding queer identities does not help the advancement for social acceptance.

The “western modes of promoting activism and visibility, such as LGBT organizations, film festivals and parades in Japanese society have been taken by some as evidence of a ‘global queering.’ In the realm of sexuality, globalization results in creative indigenization and cultural admixture more than it does in any unilateral imposition of western sexual identities.” Thus, “Japan is home to an alternative sexual modernity, a modernity produced by hybrid globalizing processes as much as by the continuation of identities, practices and mentalities inherited from the past.”

=== Transgender ===
The early 2000s were marked by new positive developments for trans people. In 2000 the trans author Fujino Chiya won the Akutagawa prize and Kamikawa Aya became the first trans politician who was elected into office and she won a seat in the election of the Tokyo Municipal Council. Small steps towards the possibility of the change of gender were taken as the legalisation of gender-affirming surgery was legalised in 1997 but it was the requirement for a person to change the gender that they were assigned at birth. However, the language used in the law pathologises trans people and only makes the change of the legal gender possible under restrictive requirements.

=== Asexuality ===
The term "asexual" was used within lesbian and bisexual communities during the 1990s. Online interaction among individuals began in the 2000s, and the identity began to receive media coverage in the 2010s. Japanese asexual people include activist Nakaken (Ken Nakamura), model and actor Satsuki Nakayama, and Tomomi Higashi, who became the first asexual politician elected to a local assembly.

=== Fictosexuality ===
Since the 1980s, there have been documented cases of individuals who experience sexual attraction only toward fictional beings rather than real humans; at the time, they identified as nijikon (2D complex). The term "fictosexuality" began to be used in Japan in the late 2010s. Akihiko Kondo, who held a wedding ceremony with Hatsune Miku in 2018, publicly identified as fictosexual in 2020s. In 2025, novelist Sayaka Murata revealed that she is fictosexual.

== The clash between traditional and contemporary ideas ==
The all encompassing term which refers to the non-heterosexual and gender-variant practices and identities that include gay, lesbian, and transgender individuals is "kono sekai" (Japanese). The term literally translated in English means “this world,” and is used to refer to the wide variety of gender and sexual subcultures.

Homosexual practice is also found among the Samurai aristocracy in part because of the heavy influence that Buddhism had on their culture specifically during the early stages of the Edo period (1600–1868). Also during this period, “there was no necessary connection made between gender and sexual preference, because men, samurai in particular, were able to engage in both same and opposite sex affairs without being stigmatized.” Because same-sex relationships were governed by a code of ethics, “elite men were able to pursue boys and young men who had not yet undergone their coming-of-age ceremonies, as well as transgender females of all ages from the lower classes who worked as actors and prostitutes.” Although bisexuality in women was practiced, the notion of lesbianism was not documented and there is “no way of cognitively linking both male and female homosexuality.

It was not until the Meiji period (1868–1912) that “Japanese sexuality” was transformed through influence from “the West.” From a male to male perspective, before the Meiji period, the “behaviors between a man and a man dealt with the commitment to spend their lives together, not on their sexual desire.” Current queer expressions were established through postwar sex magazines, coffee shops (danshoku kisssaten), gay bars (gei ba), and various queer organizations.

== Cultural restraints ==
The current social restraints on personal expression and employment opportunities related to being a sexual or gender minority in Japan present a modern challenge. As a represented minority in a country where mainstream conformity is promoted and preferred, the LGBT populace of Japan are ostracized and stereotyped by society; however they are commonly portrayed by media components. The media presents those attracted to the same gender as transgender or transsexual, or vice versa. However, even these representations are viewed as a performance instead of sexual expression, further illustrating the media's refusal to admit the existence of sexual and gender minorities. Mark McLelland stated that “the homosexual man who is transgender and restricts himself to the entertainment world is tolerated, even appreciated. However, the homosexual man who ‘passes’ and turns up to be your boss, your teacher, your neighbor or even your husband occasions a great deal of anxiety; he is a figure to be feared and or despised.” This way of thought represents the restraints on personal expression by dwelling on LGBT people as a group that crossdresses. However, as representations of gay sexuality are concerned, only those that are noticeable, i.e. those that crossdress, are wanted while the unnoticeable masses are shunned. These forces press for a common expression of self that likely would not exist if social systems allowed for their personal expression.

The suppressed expression of self is further expounded by the cultural practices revolving around family and marriage. The custom of living at home until marriage presents restrictions of LGBT life in Japan; the belief that one's family will shame and disown a child who comes out as a sexual minority represses these children into living within a different frame of existence by forcing them to behave in the same manner as a heterosexual child. Along with this suppression, the lack of private space restricts the expression of feelings and self identity during times of growth, which in turn restrains attempts at finding love in the LGBT community. Along with these family issues the government's refusal to acknowledge same-sex marriage forces gay, lesbian and bisexual people into an outcast position by society's preference for marriage and family to which they are refused access.

Further national government influence unofficially restricts employment opportunities to those who remain in the closet. “Homosexuality works against the accepted norms of social morality and can be thought of as contributing to the breaking down of the established sexual public order of society. Consequently it should not be sanctioned in modern society.” This example of government preference on education presents one example of employment opportunities lost to the LGBT populace of Japan. Furthermore, many Japanese organizations are incorrectly informed on LGBT issues which restrain and influence performance reports and promotional possibilities. These problems place pressure on sexual minorities to accept their diminished reputations or leave a company due to unrestrained bigotry from those in the workforce.

== Modern queer studies in Japan ==
Since 2010 the variety of queer studies conducted in Japan increased and includes works on queer theory and criticism, queer history, queer disability studies, lesbian studies and trans studies. One example is the anthology Kuia sutadīzu o hiraku (Exploring Queer Studies), edited by Kikuchi Natsuno, Horie Yuri, and Iino Yuriko that features many discussions of topics often overlooked in the recent developments. In 2023, a National survey on demography of sexual orientation and gender identity was conducted. In the 2020s, research emerged regarding X-gender, asexuality, and fictosexuality.

== See also ==
- Blue boy trial
- Homosexuality in Japan
- Human-oriented sexualism
- LGBTQ culture in Japan
- LGBTQ rights in Japan
- New half
- Onabe
- Otokonoko
- X-gender
