= 2005 Cannes Film Festival =

- Official poster of the 58th Cannes Film Festival featuring an original illustration by Frédéric Menant and Tim Garcia.
- Opening film: Lemming
- Closing film: Chromophobia
- Location: Cannes, France
- Founded: 1946
- Awards: Palme d'Or: L'Enfant
- Hosted by: Cécile de France
- No. of films: 21 (Main Competition)
- Festival date: 11 May 2005 – 22 May 2005
- Website: festival-cannes.com/en

Cannes Film Festival
- 2006 2004

The 58th Cannes Film Festival took place from 11 May and ran until 22 May 2005. Serbian filmmaker Emir Kusturica served as jury president for the main competition. Cécile de France hosted the opening and closing ceremonies.

Belgian filmmakers Jean-Pierre and Luc Dardenne, the Dardenne brothers, won the Palme d'Or for the second time with the drama film L'Enfant.

The festival opening film was Lemming directed by Dominik Moll, while Chromophobia directed by Martha Fiennes was the closing film.

2005 Un Certain Regard poster featuring James Dean's portrait by Floyd McCarty from Rebel Without a Cause.

== Juries ==
=== Main competition ===
- Emir Kusturica, Serbian filmmaker - Jury President
- Fatih Akın, Turkish-German filmmaker
- Javier Bardem, Spanish actor
- Nandita Das, Indian actress
- Salma Hayek, Mexican-American actress
- Benoît Jacquot, French filmmaker
- Toni Morrison, American author
- Agnès Varda, French filmmaker
- John Woo, Hong Kong filmmaker

=== Un Certain Regard ===
- Alexander Payne, American filmmaker - Jury President
- Eduardo Antin, Argentinian critic and author
- Betsy Blair, American actress
- Katia Chapoutier, Canadian journalist
- Sandra Den Hamer, Dutch director of the Rotterdam Festival
- Gilles Marchand, French director and screenwriter
- Geneviève Welcomme, French journalist

=== Cinéfondation and Short Films Competition ===
- Edward Yang, Taiwanese filmmaker - Jury President
- Chantal Akerman, Belgian director
- Colin MacCabe, Irish critic and author
- Yousry Nasrallah, Egyptian director
- Sylvie Testud, French actress

=== Camera d'Or ===
- Abbas Kiarostami, Iranian filmmaker - Jury President
- Yves Allion, French critic
- Patrick Chamoiseau, French writer
- Malik Chibane, French director
- Scott Foundas, American critic
- Laura Meyer, French cinephile
- Luc Pourrinet, French technician
- Roberto Turigliatto, Italian director of the Festival of Turin
- Romain Winding, French cinematographer

== Official Selection ==
=== In Competition ===
The following feature films competed for the Palme d'Or:

English Title	Original Title	Director(s)	Production Country
Bashing	バッシング	Masahiro Kobayashi	Japan
Battle in Heaven	Batalla en el cielo	Carlos Reygadas	Mexico, France, Germany
Broken Flowers		Jim Jarmusch	United States, France
Caché		Michael Haneke	France, Austria, Germany, Italy
Don't Come Knocking		Wim Wenders	Germany, United States
L'Enfant		Jean-Pierre and Luc Dardenne	Belgium
Election	黑社會	Johnnie To	Hong Kong
Free Zone		Amos Gitai	Israel
A History of Violence		David Cronenberg	United States, Canada, Germany
Kilomètre Zéro	کیلۆمەتری سفر	Hiner Saleem	Iraq, France
Last Days		Gus Van Sant	United States
Lemming (opening film)		Dominik Moll	France
Manderlay		Lars von Trier	Denmark, Sweden, Netherlands, France, Germany, United Kingdom, Italy
To Paint or Make Love	Peindre ou faire l'amour	Arnaud Larrieu and Jean-Marie Larrieu	France
Once You're Born You Can No Longer Hide	Quando sei nato non puoi più nasconderti	Marco Tullio Giordana	Italy, France, United Kingdom
Shanghai Dreams	青紅	Wang Xiaoshuai	China
Sin City		Frank Miller and Robert Rodriguez	United States
Tale of Cinema	극장전	Hong Sang-soo	South Korea
The Three Burials of Melquiades Estrada		Tommy Lee Jones	United States, France, Mexico
Three Times	最好的時光	Hou Hsiao-hsien	Taiwan
Where The Truth Lies		Atom Egoyan	Canada, United Kingdom

=== Un Certain Regard ===
The following films were selected for the competition of Un Certain Regard:

English Title	Original Title	Director(s)	Production Country
The Bow	활	Kim Ki-duk	South Korea
Cinema, Aspirins and Vultures	Cinema, Aspirinas e Urubus	Marcelo Gomes	Brazil
Dark Horse	Voksne mennesker	Dagur Kári	Denmark, Iceland
The Death of Mr. Lazarescu	Moartea domnului Lăzărescu	Cristi Puiu	Romania
Delwende		Saint Pierre Yaméogo	Burkina Faso, France
Down in the Valley		David Jacobson	United States
Le filmeur		Alain Cavalier	France
The Forsaken Land	සුළඟ එනු පිණිස	Vimukthi Jayasundara	Sri Lanka
Havana Blues	Habana Blues	Benito Zambrano	Spain, Cuba
I Am Guilty	Falscher Bekenner	Christoph Hochhäusler	Germany
Jewboy		Tony Krawitz	Australia
Johanna		Kornél Mundruczó	Hungary
The King		James Marsh	United Kingdom, United States
Lower City	Cidade Baixa	Sérgio Machado	Brazil
Marock		Laïla Marrakchi	Morocco, France
My God, My God, Why Hast Thou Forsaken Me?	エリ・エリ・レマ・サバクタニ	Shinji Aoyama	Japan
Northeast	Nordeste	Juan Diego Solanas	Argentina, France
One Night	یک شب	Niki Karimi	Iran
Sangre		Amat Escalante	Mexico
Sleeper	Schläfer	Benjamin Heisenberg	Austria, Germany
Time to Leave	Le Temps qui reste	François Ozon	France
Yellow Fella		Ivan Sen	Australia
Zim and Co.		Pierre Jolivet	France

=== Out of Competition ===
The following films were selected to be screened out of competition:

English Title	Original Title	Director(s)	Production Country
Avenge But One of My Two Eyes		Avi Mograbi	Israel, France
A Bittersweet Life	달콤한 인생	Kim Jee-woon	South Korea
The Burnt Theatre	Les Artistes du Théâtre Brûlé	Rithy Panh	Cambodia, France
C'est pas tout à fait la vie dont j'avais rêvé		Michel Piccoli	France
Chromophobia (closing film)		Martha Fiennes	United Kingdom
Cindy: The Doll Is Mine (short)		Bertrand Bonello	France
Crossing the Bridge: The Sound of Istanbul		Fatih Akın	Turkey, Germany
Darshan: The Embrace	Darshan - L'étreinte	Jan Kounen	France
Kirikou and the Wild Beasts	Kirikou et les Bêtes sauvages	Michel Ocelot and Bénédicte Galup	France, Vietnam
Kiss Kiss Bang Bang		Shane Black	United States
Match Point		Woody Allen	United Kingdom, Luxembourg, United States
Merry Christmas	Joyeux Noël	Christian Carion	France, Germany, United Kingdom, Belgium, Romania, Japan
Midnight Movies: From the Margin to the Mainstream		Stuart Samuels	Canada, United States
Princess Raccoon	オペレッタ狸御殿	Seijun Suzuki	Japan
The Power of Nightmares: The Rise of the Politics of Fear (3 episodes)		Adam Curtis	United Kingdom
Star Wars: Episode III – Revenge of the Sith		George Lucas	United States

=== Cinéfondation ===
The following short films were selected for the competition of Cinéfondation:

- Vdvoyom (A deux) by Nikolay Khomeriki (France)
- A Song for Rebecca by Norah McGettigan (Poland)
- Badgered by Sharon Colman (United Kingdom)
- Bikur Holim by Maya Dreifuss (Israel)
- Buy It Now by Antonio Campos (United States)
- El espino by Théo Court Bustamante (Cuba)
- En la oscuridad by Juan Manuel Rampoldi, Marcelo Charras (Argentina)
- Exit (2004 film) by Robert Depuis (Denmark)
- Five O' Clock Shadow by Malcolm Lamont (United States)
- La cerca by Rubén Mendoza (Colombia)
- La plaine by Roland Edzard (France)
- Le violon by Heng Yang (China)
- Slavek The Shit by Grímur Hákonarson (Iceland, Czech Republic)
- Conscience (film) (Svedomí) by Jan Bohuslav (Czech Republic)
- Tiens toi tranquille by Sameh Zoabi (France)
- Vanilla Song by Jakob Rørvik (United Kingdom)
- Walk On a Little More by Min-young Shim (South Korea)

=== Short Films Competition ===
The following short films competed for the Short Film Palme d'Or:

- Baby Shark (Bébé requin) by Pascal-Alex Vincent
- Before Dawn by Bálint Kenyeres
- Clara by Van Sowerwine
- Disparue by Kit Hui
- Kitchen by Alice Winocour
- L'homme qui s'est rencontre by Ben Crowe
- Nothing Special by Helena Brooks
- Sous la lueur de la lune by Peter Ghesquiere
- Wayfarers (Podorozhni) by Igor Strembitskyy

=== Cannes Classics ===
Tribute

- 49th Parallel by Michael Powell (1941)
- A Matter of Life and Death by Michael Powell, Emeric Pressburger (1946)
- Black Narcissus by Michael Powell, Emeric Pressburger (1947)
- I Know Where I'm Going! by Michael Powell, Emeric Pressburger (1945)
- The Pearl (La perla) by Emilio "Indio" Fernández (1947)
- Los Olvidados by Luis Buñuel (1950)
- Salón México (Mexico Lounge) by Emilio "Indio" Fernández (1949)
- The Edge of the World by Michael Powell (1937)

Documentaries about Cinema

- Al'Lèèssi... une actrice Africaine by Rahmatou Keita
- Ingmar Bergman Complete: Bergman and the Cinema / Bergman and the Theatre / Bergman and Fårö Island by Marie Nyreröd (2004)
- James Dean: Forever Young by Michael J. Sheridan
- John Cassavetes by André S. Labarthe
- Kitano Takeshi Shinshutsu-Kibotsu by Jean-Pierre Limosin
- Moments choisis des histoire(s) du cinema by Jean-Luc Godard
- Shadowing the Third Man by Frederick Baker

Restored prints

- An Airman's Letter to His Mother by Michael Powell (1941 Short)
- Notes Towards an African Orestes (Appunti per un'Orestiade Africana) by Pier Paolo Pasolini (1975)
- Beyond the Rocks by Sam Wood (1922 / 2005)
- Bullitt by Peter Yates (1968)
- There Was a Father (Chichi ariki) by Yasujirō Ozu (1942)
- East of Eden by Elia Kazan (1955)
- La Fille de l'eau (Whirlpool of Fate) by Jean Renoir (1925)
- The Fire Within (Le feu follet) by Louis Malle (1963)
- Angels of Sin (Les anges du péché) by Robert Bresson (1943)
- Pather Panchali by Satyajit Ray (1955)
- Pele Eterno by Anibal Massaini Neto (2004)
- Rebel Without a Cause by Nicholas Ray (1955)
- King Boxer (Tian xia di yi quan) by Chang-Wah Chung (1973)
- Two-Lane Blacktop by Monte Hellman (1971)

== Parallel sections ==
=== International Critics' Week ===
The following films were screened for the 44th International Critics' Week (44e Semaine de la Critique):

Feature film competition

- The Great Ecstasy of Robert Carmichael by Thomas Clay (United Kingdom)
- The Horizon of Events (L’orizzonte degli eventi) by Daniele Vicari (Italy)
- Little Jerusalem (La petite Jérusalem) by Karin Albou (France)
- Me and You and Everyone We Know by Miranda July (United States)
- A Stranger of Mine (Unmei Janai Hito) by Kenji Uchida (Japan)
- Grain in Ear (Máng zhòng) by Zhang Lu (China, South Korea)
- Orlando Vargas by Juan Pittaluga (Uruguay, France)

Short film competition

- Le grand vent by Valérie Liénardy (Belgium)
- Respire by Wi Ding Ho (Taiwan)
- Mirror Mechanics by Siegfried A. Fruhauf (Austria)
- Blue Tongue by Justin Kurzel (Australia)
- Imago... by Cédric Babouche (France)
- Get the Rabbit Back by Dimitar Mitovski & Kamen Kalev (Bulgaria)
- Jona/Tomberry by Rosto (Netherlands)

=== Directors' Fortnight ===
The following films were screened for the 2005 Directors' Fortnight (Quinzaine des Réalizateurs):

- Alice by Marco Martins (Portugal)
- Be with Me by Eric Khoo (Singapore)
- Cache-cache by Yves Caumon (France)
- Family Diary (Cronaca familiare) by Valerio Zurlini (1962)
- Crying Fist by Ryoo Seung-wan (South Korea)
- Douches froides by Antony Cordier (France)
- Factotum by Bent Hamer (Norway, United States, Germany, France)
- Géminis by Albertina Carri (Argentina, France)
- Guernsey by Nanouk Leopold (Netherlands, Belgium)
- Iron Island (Jazireh Ahani) by Mohammad Rasoulof (Iran)
- Keane by Lodge Kerrigan (United States)
- The Buried Forest (Umoregi) by Kohei Oguri (Japan)
- The Moustache by Emmanuel Carrère (France)
- Odete by João Pedro Rodrigues (Portugal)
- Ride the High Country by Sam Peckinpah (1962)
- Room by Kyle Henry (United States)
- Seven Invisible Men by Šarūnas Bartas (Portugal, France, Lithuania)
- Sisters In Law by Kim Longinotto, Florence Ayisi (United Kingdom, Cameroon)
- Tbilisi-Tbilisi by Levan Zakareishvili (Georgia)
- The President's Last Bang by Im Sang-soo (South Korea)
- Travaux, on sait quand ça commence... by Brigitte Roüan (France)
- Who’s Camus Anyway? by Mitsuo Yanagimachi (Japan)
- Wolf Creek by Greg McLean (Australia)

Short films

- À bras le corps by Katell Quillévéré (19 min.)
- À mains nues by Agnès Feuvre (26 min.)
- Consultation Room by Kei Oyama (9 min.)
- Cosmetic Emergency by Martha Colburn (9 min.)
- Da Janela Do Meu Quarto by Cao Guimarães (5 min.)
- Du soleil en hiver by Samuel Collardey (17 min.)
- Etoile violette by Axelle Ropert (45 min.)
- Instructions for a Light and Sound Machine by Peter Tscherkassky (17 min.)
- Kara, Anak Sebatang Pohon by Edwin (9 min.)
- Majorettes by Lola Doillon (16 min.)
- Nits by Harry Wootliff (11 min.)
- Résfilm by Sándor Kardos (19 min.)
- The Buried Forest by Kohei Oguri (1h33
- Trilogy About Clouds by Naoyuki Tsuji (14 min.)
- Vinil verde by Kleber Mendonça Filho (17 min.)

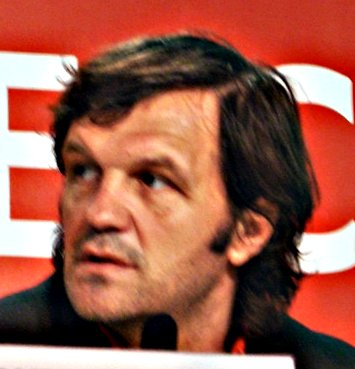
Emir Kusturica, 2005 Jury President

== Official Awards ==
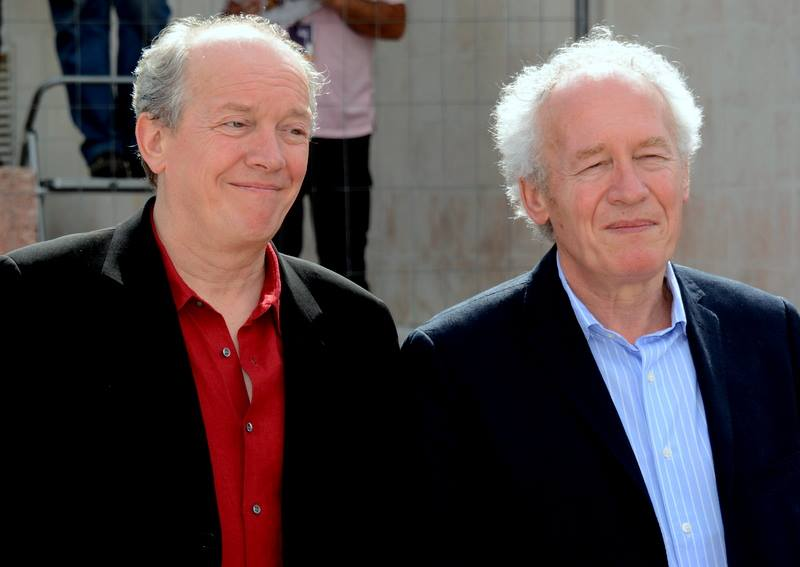
Luc Dardenne (left) and Jean-Pierre Dardenne, Palme d'Or winners

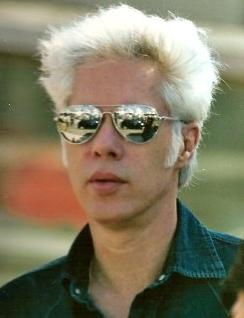
Jim Jarmusch, Gran Prix winner

=== In Competition ===
The following films and people received the 2005 Official selection awards:

- Palme d'Or: L'Enfant by Jean-Pierre and Luc Dardenne
- Grand Prix: Broken Flowers by Jim Jarmusch
- Best Director: Caché by Michael Haneke
- Best Screenplay: Guillermo Arriaga for The Three Burials of Melquiades Estrada
- Best Actress: Hanna Laslo for Free Zone
- Best Actor: Tommy Lee Jones for The Three Burials of Melquiades Estrada
- Prix du Jury: Shanghai Dreams by Wang Xiaoshuai

=== Un Certain Regard ===
- Prix Un Certain Regard: The Death of Mr. Lazarescu by Cristi Puiu
- Un Certain Regard Prix de l'intimité: Le filmeur by Alain Cavalier
- Un Certain Regard Prix de l'espoir: Delwende by S. Pierre Yameogo

=== Cinéfondation ===
- First Prize: Buy It Now by Antonio Campos
- Second Prize:
  - Bikur Holim by Maya Dreifuss
  - Vdvoyom by Nikolay Khomeriki
- Third Prize:
  - La plaine by Roland Edzard
  - Tiens toi tranquille by Sameh Zoabi

=== Caméra d'Or ===
- The Forsaken Land by Vimukthi Jayasundara
- Me and You and Everyone We Know by Miranda July

=== Short Films Competition ===
- Short Film Palme d'Or: Wayfarers by Igor Strembitskyy
  - Special Mention: Clara by Van Sowerwine

== Independent Awards ==
=== FIPRESCI Prizes ===
- Hidden by Michael Haneke (In competition)
- Crying Fist by Ryoo Seung-wan (Directors' Fortnight)
- Blood by Amat Escalante (Un Certain Regard)

=== Vulcan Award of the Technical Artist ===
- Leslie Shatz for Sound design in Last Days
- Robert Rodriguez for Visual processing in Sin City

=== Prize of the Ecumenical Jury ===
- Hidden by Michael Haneke
  - Special mention: Delwende by S. Pierre Yameogo

=== Award of the Youth ===
- Lower City by Sérgio Machado

=== Critics' Week ===
- Grand prix: Me and You and Everyone We Know by Miranda July
- Prix ACID: Grain in Ear by Zhang Lu
- Grand Prix Canal+ (short film): Jona/Tomberry de Rosto

=== Directors' Fortnight ===
- 3ème Label Europa Cinéma: The Moustache by Emmanuel Carrère
- Prix Art & Essai CICAE: Sisters In Law by Kim Longinotto, Florence Ayisi
- 3ème Prix Regards Jeunes: Alice by Marco Martins
- Prix SACD du court métrage: Du soleil en hiver by Samuel Collardey
- Prix Gras Savoye: À bras le corps by Katell Quillévéré

=== Prix François Chalais ===
- Once You're Born You Can No Longer Hide, by Marco Tullio Giordana

== Media ==
- INA: Opening of the 2005 Festival (commentary in French)
- INA: List of winners of the 2005 Festival (commentary in French)
