= ROSTO =

ROSTO or Rosto may refer to:

- DOSAAF, a paramilitary sport organization in the Soviet Union
- Rosto (1969–2019), Dutch artist and filmmaker
