= Paula Jiménez España =

Argentine writer, poet, journalist, psychologist and astrologer

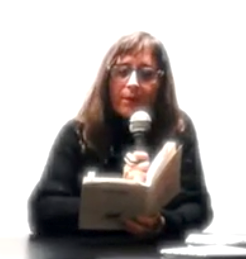
- In a 2015 video
- Born: 23 August 1969 (age 57); Buenos Aires, Argentina
- Education: University of Buenos Aires
- Occupations: Writer, journalist, poet, LGBT activist
- Website: www.instagram.com/batijimenez/

Paula Jiménez España (born 23 August 1969) is an Argentinian writer, poet, journalist, psychologist, and astrologer. She is also an activist concerned with human rights, feminism, and LGBT communities.

== Biography ==
Paula Jiménez España was born in Buenos Aires, Argentina on 23 August 1969.

She completed her secondary studies in the Our Lady of Mercy College, Buenos Aires. She received a degree in psychology at the University of Buenos Aires and one in astrology from Casa XI.

In 2001, she published her first book of poetry, Ser feliz en Baltimore. She went on to publish La casa en la avenida (2004), La mala vida (2007), Espacios Naturales (2009), Canciones de Amor (2015), Paisaje Alrededor (2015), Terrores Nocturnos (2017) and her personal anthology El Corazón de los Otros (México, 2015).

In 2012, she published a short story collection, Pollera Pantalón, of which several editions were made. In 2018, she published her first novel, La Doble and a literary essay collection, La Cifra Mágica.

In 2021, she published La suerte, a book that combines poetry and astrology.

If we consider the affinity between dissidence and esotericism, I do believe that on this side, on the side of magic and poetry, we remain those of us who have cultivated a more refined sensitivity born from the experience of exclusion and vulnerability. Resistance launched us into wonder.

— Paula Jiménez España

In 2022, she published El cielo de Tushita, a book of poems about becoming a mother and the contemplation about nature, influenced by some ideas close to Buddhism.

In 2024, she wrote a book of poetry, El latido que pulsa entre tus cosas, a book that stylistically expands on her previous work and addresses themes in previous poems about mourning and the passage of time. It ends with the finding of Buddhism in a voice that decompresses melancholy.

Her last book, Desde esta noche cambiará mi vida, published in 2024, is a novel set in the timeline of the book ranges from the 1970s to the pandemic and traces the construction of a lesbian's identity through social and political developments.

== Activism ==
Jiménez de España regularly participates in feminist, LGBT, and human rights activities, marches, and organizations.

In the 1990s, she frequented lesbian feminist organizations like Las Lunas y Las Otras, La Casa del Encuentro and La Fulana.

== Awards ==
- 2006: Tres de Febrero Poetry Award
- 2007: Second place for Hegoak LGBT short story (Basque Country)
- 2008: First place Award for the National Endowment of the Artes
- 2015: recognition of the National Award (Ministry of Culture of the Nation)

== Journalism ==
She writes regularly in the supplements Soy and Las 12 in the newspaper Página 12 and for the culture section of Clarín.

== Works ==
- Ser feliz en Baltimore (poetry), 2001.
- La casa en la avenida (poetry), 2004.
- La mala vida (poetry), 2007.
- Espacios Naturales (poetry), 2009.
- Pollera Pantalón (short stories), 2012.
- Canciones de Amor (poetry), 2015.
- Paisaje Alrededor (poetry), 2015.
- El Corazón de los Otros (anthology), 2015.
- Terrores Nocturnos, (poetry), 2017.
- La Doble (novel), 2018.
- La Cifra Mágica (essays), 2018.
- La suerte (poetry), 2021.
- El cielo de Tushita (poetry), 2022.
- El latido que pulsa entre tus cosas (poetry), 2024
- Desde está noche cambiará mi vida (novel), 2024

== General references ==
- "Paula Jiménez España". The Praxis Journal.
- Dema, Verónica (20 June 2018). "Paula Jiménez España: 'Se ha puesto en cuestión el mandato de obedecer a la maternidad'". La Nación.
