= Shinjuku Boys =

- The Shinjuku Boys: Kazuki, Tatsu, Gaish
- Directed by: Jano Williams, Kim Longinotto
- Produced by: Kim Longinotto
- Starring: Gaish; Kazuki; Tatsu
- Cinematography: Kim Longinotto
- Edited by: John Mister
- Music by: Nigel Hawks
- Distributed by: Twentieth Century Vixen Productions for the BBC
- Release date: 1995
- Running time: 53 minutes
- Country: United Kingdom
- Languages: English, Japanese, subtitled

Shinjuku Boys is a 1995 film by Kim Longinotto and Jano Williams. It explores the lives of three non-binary or transgender men who work at the New Marilyn Club in Tokyo, Japan. The term they use for themselves is onabe, and the three protagonists discuss their romantic relationships, their relationships with their parents, their gender presentations, how they understand their own genders, and their different outlooks on life.

== Reception ==
In 1995, Shinjuku Boys won Outstanding Documentary at the San Francisco Gay and Lesbian Film Festival, a Silver Hugo Prize at the Chicago International Film Festival and Gold Prize at Houston Film Festival. The film received positive reviews following its 2010 release by Second Run DVD. In a review at DVDTalk, Chris Neilson praised the film’s directors, commenting that "Through low-key cinéma vérité filmmaking, Longinotto and Williams provide insight into the professional and personal lives of the trio of onnabe" [sic]. Sarah Cronin of Electric Sheep Magazine also notes that "Despite the fact that it's a cruder, more dated film, it's the strength of the interviews in Shinjuku Boys that makes it an even more arresting documentary."

== See also ==
- Shinjuku Ni-chōme, an LGBT bar district in Tokyo
