= The Demon Stirs =

- Directed by: Marie-Pascale Osterrieth
- Written by: Michèle Bernier; Florence Cestac
- Produced by: Claude Berri; Pierre Grunstein
- Starring: Michèle Bernier; Simon Abkarian
- Cinematography: Charles Van Damme
- Music by: Jacques Davidovici
- Distributed by: Pathé
- Release date: 2005
- Language: French
- Budget: $6.7 million
- Box office: $535.000

The Demon Stirs (French: Le démon de midi) is a 2005 French comedy film written and directed by Marie-Pascale Osterrieth and starring Michèle Bernier and Simon Abkarian. It is based on the graphic novel Le Démon de midi (1996) by Florence Cestac.

== Cast ==
- Michèle Bernier as Anne Cestac
- Simon Abkarian as Julien Cestac
- Mathis Arguillère as Pierre
- Hiam Abbass as Rim
- Alexandra Pandev as Alex
- Florence Viala as Maude
- Julie-Anne Roth as Claire
- Zinedine Soualem as Samir
- Toni Garrani as Nino
- Jean-Marc Bihour as Tristan
- Stéphane Hillel as Gabby
- Jean-Luc Lemoine as Raphaël
- Jérôme Pouly as Didier
- Jean Dell as The mayor
- Riton Liebman as The lifeguard
- Annie Mercier as Grandma
- Claudia Cardinale as herself

== See also ==
- List of French films of 2005
