= Amat Escalante =

Spanish and Mexican filmmaker (born 1979)

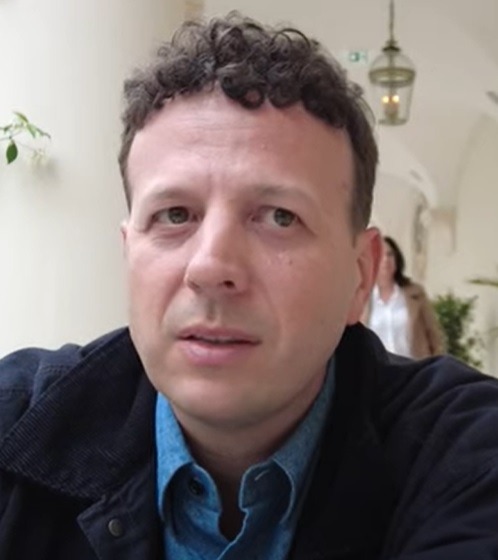
- Escalante Festival de Cannes 2023
- Born: 28 February 1979 (age 46); Barcelona, Spain
- Citizenship: Spain; Mexico
- Occupations: Film director, producer and screenwriter
- Years active: 2002–present

Amat Escalante (born 28 February 1979) is a Spanish and Mexican film director, producer and screenwriter. He is most well known for directing the controversial Mexican crime thriller Heli for which he was awarded the best director prize award at the 2013 Cannes Film Festival, and for directing the 2016 Mexican drama The Untamed for which he received the Silver Lion for best director at the 2016 Venice Film Festival.

== Biography ==
Escalante was incidentally born in Barcelona, Spain while his parents — a Mexican father and an American mother — had been living in Norway. He spent most of his early years in Guanajuato, Mexico, but moved to Spain in 2001 to study film editing and sound at the Center for Cinematographic Studies of Catalonia (Centre d'Estudis Cinematogràfics de Catalunya, CECC) and apply for Spanish citizenship; which he failed to secure.

After his stint in Barcelona, he joined the International School of Film and Television (EICTV) in Havana, Cuba an institution founded by Nobel Prize-winner Gabriel García Márquez, Fernando Birri and the Julio García Espinosa "to support the development of national audio-visual industries" in non-aligned countries. Back in Mexico, he directed a short film (Amarrados, 2002) that received an award at the 2003 Berlin International Film Festival.

He worked as an assistant of Carlos Reygadas in Batalla en el cielo (2005), which entered the 2005 Cannes Film Festival. During the filming of the movie, both became close friends, and Reygadas ended up co-producing some of Escalante's first films. One of those films, Sangre (2005), filmed in November 2004 with a budget of US$60,000, was included in Un Certain Regard (a section of the same festival) and in both Rotterdam and San Sebastián.

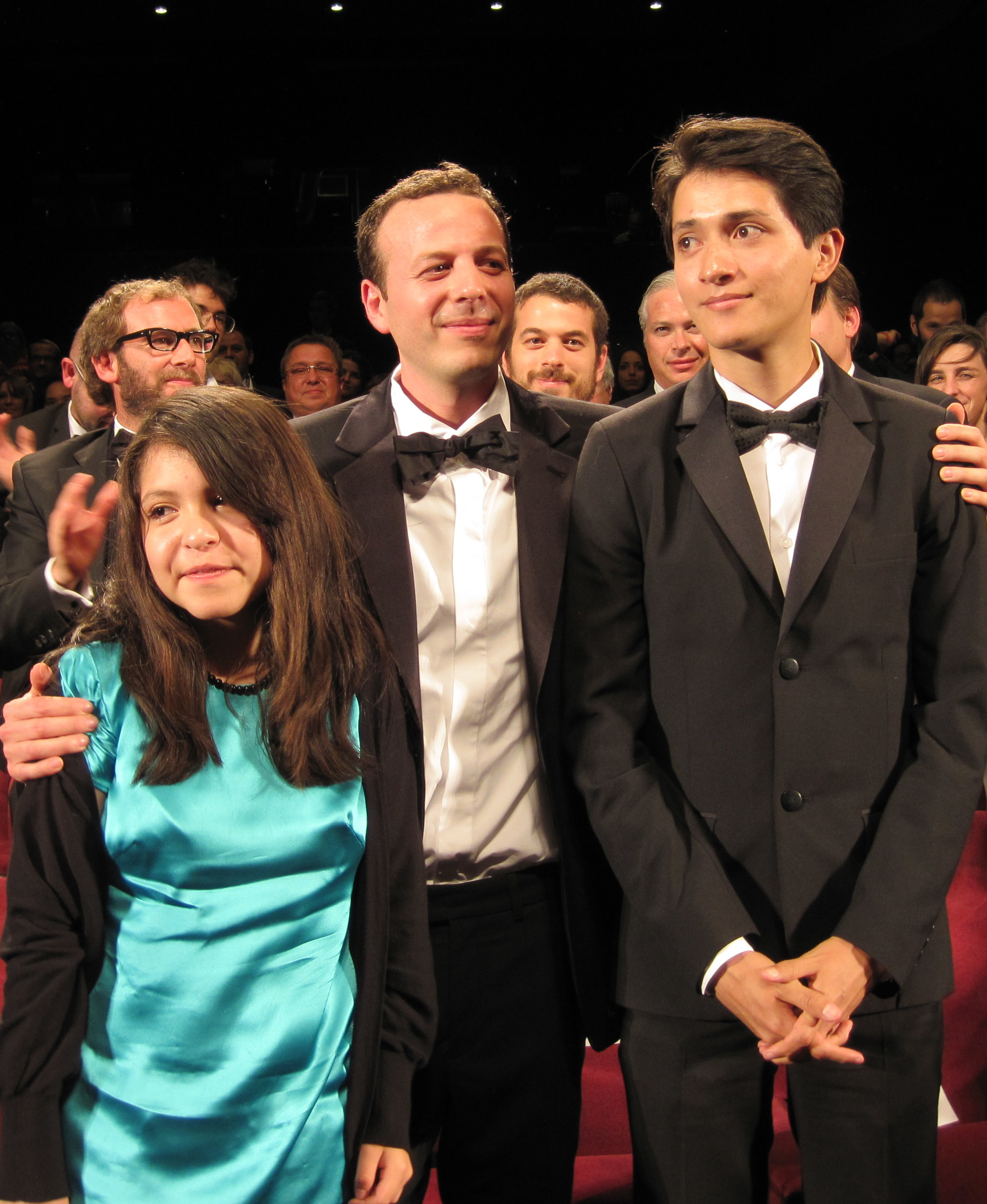
Amat Escalante (center) with Andrea Vergara (left) and Armando Espitia (right) in 2013

His film Heli was selected to compete for the Palme d'Or at the 2013 Cannes Film Festival and was awarded the prize for Best Director by a jury presided by U.S. film director Steven Spielberg.

In 2016, his film The Untamed was selected to compete in the 73rd Venice International Film Festival. Escalante won the Silver Lion for Best Direction for his film.

== Filmography ==
- Amarrados (2002), producer
- The Legend of Pete Jones (2005), cinematographer
- Sangre (2005), director, producer, screenwriter, For which he won the "Film Critics and Press Award"
- Los bastardos (2008), director, producer, screenwriter
- Heli (2013), director, associate producer, screenwriter
- The Untamed (2016), director, producer, screenwriter
- Narcos: Mexico (2020), director
- Lost in the Night (2023), director

== See also ==
- Nuevo Cine Mexicano
- Carlos Reygadas
