= Le Combat dans l'île =

1962 French drama film

- Directed by: Alain Cavalier
- Written by: Jean-Paul Rappeneau (dialogue)
- Screenplay by: Alain Cavalier
- Produced by: Louis Malle (supervising producer)
- Starring: Romy Schneider; Jean-Louis Trintignant
- Cinematography: Pierre Lhomme
- Edited by: Pierre Gillette
- Music by: Serge Nigg
- Color process: Black and white
- Production companies: La Société des Films Sirius; Nouvelles Éditions de Films
- Distributed by: Union Générale Cinématographique
- Release date: 7 September 1962
- Running time: 104 minutes
- Country: France
- Language: French

Le Combat dans l'île is a 1962 French drama film directed by Alain Cavalier and starring Romy Schneider and Jean-Louis Trintignant. Set in the context of the campaign of bombings and assassinations by the Organisation de l'armée secrète, it tells the story of an austere young man who is corrupted by the lure of terrorism and of his more sympathetic wife, who finds both independence and a more worthwhile partner.

== Plot ==
Clément, reserved son of a wealthy industrialist in Paris, has joined a far-right terrorist organisation. His ebullient wife Anne, formerly a popular actress, knows nothing of it until she finds a disassembled bazooka in their bedroom. One night, under orders from an associate named Serge, Clément uses the bazooka to destroy the apartment of a popular socialist politician. The media report that the politician died in the explosion and, ringing from the airport, Serge tells Clément to disappear.

He takes refuge with Anne in an isolated watermill belonging to Paul, an old school friend who now runs a socialist printing press. The media then report that the politician was not in his apartment and that the rocket obliterated a dummy. Clément realises that Serge set him up and, determined to kill him in revenge, sets off to hunt him down. Left in the watermill, Anne grows closer to the amiable Paul, who is attracted to her but reluctant to take advantage of his old friend. He encourages her to emerge from her loneliness and to go back to work as an actress. As months pass and Clément does not return, the two eventually become lovers and Anne falls pregnant.

Then Clément reappears from South America, having found and killed his opponent there with the help of local Nazis. With some right-wing thugs he beats Paul up and leaves him a pistol, saying that he will contact him to settle things in a man-to-man shoot-out. One day at the watermill, Clément calls to Paul from a wooded island opposite, telling him to bring the pistol and fight. Though Anne is terrified, Paul has military skills learned from the war in Algeria and outwits his opponent. He and Anne can start a new life together.

== Cast ==
- Romy Schneider as Anne
- Jean-Louis Trintignant as Clément Lesser
- Henri Serre as Paul
- Diane Lepvrier as Cécile (as Diana Lepvrier)
- Robert Bousquet as Lucien
- Jacques Berlioz as Le père
- Armand Meffre as André
- Maurice Garrel as Terrasse
- Marcel Cuvelier as Himself
- Pierre Asso as Serge

== Reception ==
Though overshadowed at the time of its release, the film has since gained respect. A recent American review commented:

The combat .... involves a gun duel on a country marsh. It's long in arriving but worth the wait .... Making his debut, Cavalier is clearly surfing the early crest of the French new wave - a little Jean-Luc Godard, even a little of Malle's "Elevator to the Gallows".... But the movie isn't frivolous. It has stores of menace and sex .... In so many ways, "Le Combat" feels like a preview of Francois Truffaut's "Jules and Jim".

On review aggregator website Rotten Tomatoes, the film holds an approval rating of 92% based on 12 reviews.
