= Saint Pierre Yaméogo =

Burkinabé film director and screenwriter (1955–2019)

Saint Pierre Yameogo
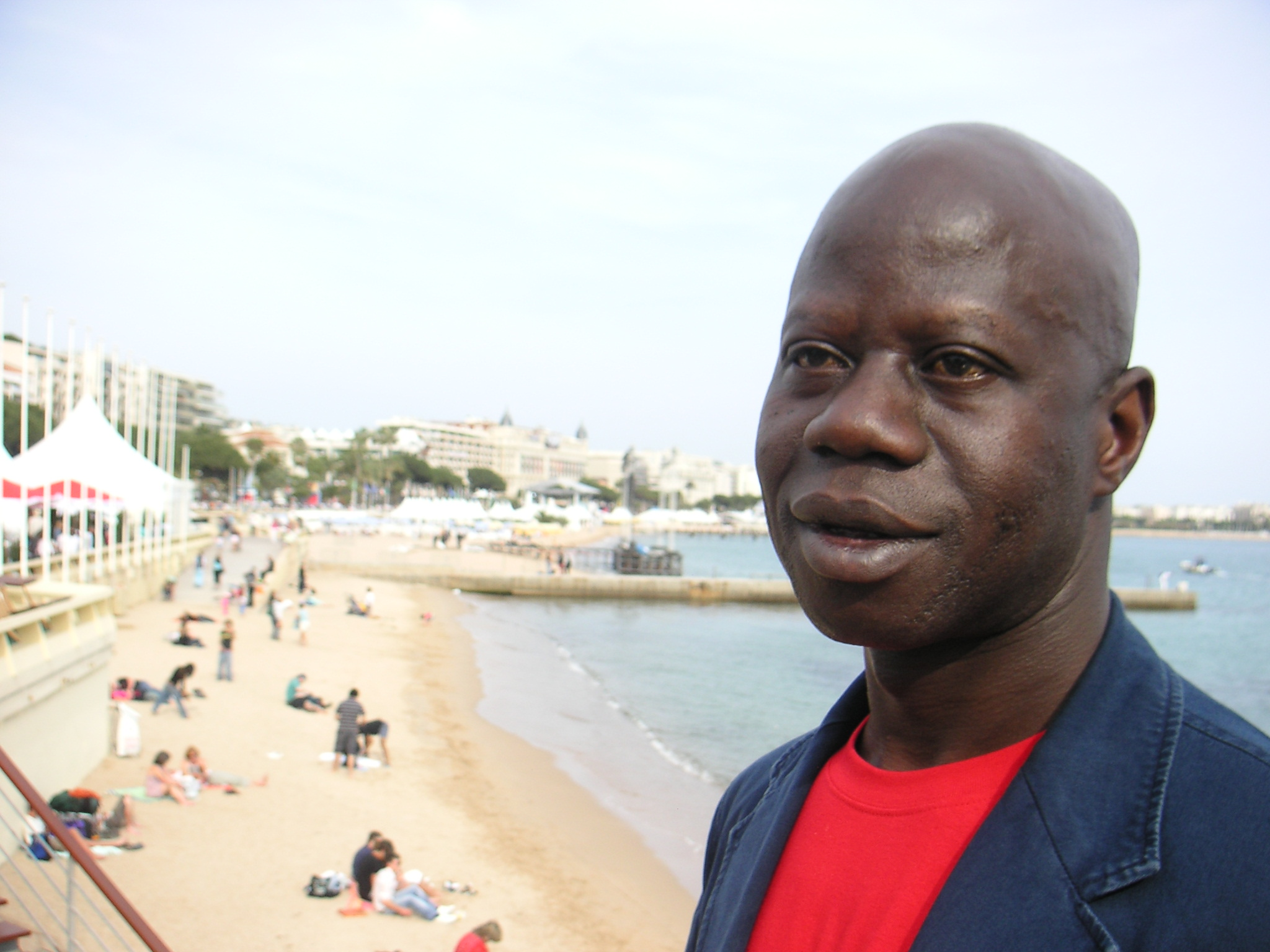
- Yameogo in 2005
- Born: 15 May 1955; Koudougou, Burkina Faso
- Died: 1 April 2019 (aged 63); Ouagadougou, Burkina Faso
- Occupations: Film director Screenwriter
- Years active: 1987–2019
- Notable work: Dunia (1987 film); Laafi - Tout va bien (1991); Wendemi, l'enfant du bon Dieu (1993); Silmandé - Tourbillon (1998); Moi et mon blanc (2003); Delwende (2005); Réfugiés…. mais humains (2007); Bayiri, la patrie

Saint Pierre Yameogo (15 May 1955 – 1 April 2019) was a Burkinabé film director and screenwriter. He directed six films since 1987. His film Delwende was screened in the Un Certain Regard section at the 2005 Cannes Film Festival where it won the Prize of Hope award.

== Filmography ==
- L'Œuf silhouette (1984)
- Dunia (1987)
- Laafi - Tout va bien (1991)
- Wendemi, l'enfant du bon Dieu (1993)
- Silmandé - Tourbillon (1998)
- Moi et mon blanc (2003)
- Delwende (2005)
- Réfugiés…. mais humains (2007)
- Bayiri, la patrie (2011)
