= Delwende =

2005 film

- Directed by: S. Pierre Yameogo
- Written by: S. Pierre Yameogo
- Produced by: Pierre-Alain Meier; S. Pierre Yameogo
- Starring: Blandine Yaméogo
- Cinematography: Jürg Hassler
- Edited by: Jean-Christophe Ané
- Release date: 13 May 2005
- Running time: 90 minutes
- Countries: Burkina Faso; France
- Language: French

Delwende is a 2005 Burkinabé drama film directed by S. Pierre Yameogo about a mother and daughter resisting to succumb to a local sexist tradition. It was screened in the Un Certain Regard section at the 2005 Cannes Film Festival where it won the Prize of Hope award.

== Plot ==
After a young boy dies of meningitis, Napoko Diarrha (Yaméogo) is accused of eating his soul because of a local sexist tradition.

While this happens, her husband feels disgraced that Diarrha resists the idea of marrying off their daughter, so he exacts his revenge by spreading a dangerous rumor that would probably get her killed. Because of this, Diarrha's fate falls into the village elder's hands. When she finds out she will go trial, she decides to flee to the nearest town, Ouagadougou, before that can take place.

After successfully leaving her village, Diarrha's age causes her health to decline, while her daughter grows up.

Some time later, her daughter decides to travel to Ouagadougou, in search of her missing mother. Once they are reconnected, they attempt to escape from their male-dominated society.

== Cast ==
- Blandine Yaméogo as Napoko
- Claire Ilboudo as Pougbila
- Célestin Zongo as Diahrra
- Abdoulaye Komboudri as Nonceur
- Daniel Kabore as Bancé, l'ancien
- Jules Taonssa as Raogo, le devin
- Thomas Ngourma as Elie, le fou
