= Mimie Mathy =

French actress, comedian and singer (born 1957)

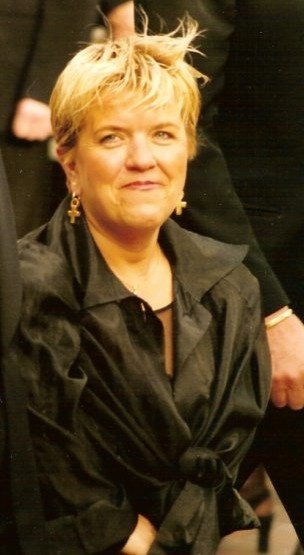
- Mimie Mathy at the 1994 Cannes Film Festival
- Born: Michèle Mathy; 8 July 1957 (age 69); Lyon, France
- Occupations: Actress, comedian, singer, writer
- Years active: 1982–present
- Spouse: Benoist Gérard (2004–present)

Michèle "Mimie" Mathy (born 8 July 1957) is a French actress, comedian and singer. A former member of the female comedy trio "Les Filles" with Michèle Bernier and Isabelle de Botton, Mathy is best known for her starring role in the long-running Josephine, Guardian Angel television series. Mathy has achondroplasia, a form of dwarfism, and is 1.32 m (4 ft 4 in) tall.

== Life and career ==
Interested in the theatre from childhood, she studied the dramatic arts from 1979 to 1981 at Michel Fugain's workshop in Nice. In the early 1980s she performed in a number of theatre roles and appeared in Le Petit Théâtre de Bouvard television show. She formed a touring comedy troupe "Le Trio des Filles" (The Three Girls) which performed shows such as Existe en trois tailles (Available in Three Sizes) from 1988 to 1993. In 1993 she performed in the TV movie Une nounou pas comme les autres (A Nanny Like No Other), which garnered a 52.7% market share (~12 million viewers) in France.

She has starred in the title role of TV series Joséphine Ange Gardien (Joséphine, Guardian Angel) since 1997: the show reached popularity in France.

In 2006 she released a music record, La Vie M'a Raconté (Life Told Me) produced by Patrick Fiori.

== Personal life ==
Mathy first met restaurateur Benoist Gérard when she picked him out of the audience, as part of one of her stage comedy routines. They became romantically involved, and married on 27 August 2005.

== Philanthropy ==
Since 1994, Mathy has performed at least 15 times in the annual Les Enfoirés (The Tossers) charity concert for Restaurants du Cœur (Restaurants of the Heart). Les Enfoirés was the most watched TV show in France in 2009, with 12.3 million viewers.

Mathy is a former National Goodwill Ambassador for the French branch of the UNICEF.

== Awards and recognition ==
François Dorieux named a rose cultivar for her in 1999. In 2009 she was selected the sixth most popular French celebrity and highest ranking female celebrity by the weekly Le Journal du Dimanche. Mathy received the title of Knight (Chevalier) of the French Order of Merit in 2013, and was made a Knight of the Legion of Honour in 2015.

== Discography ==
Year	Title	Sales
2006	La vie m'a raconté (Life told me)	60,000

== Filmography ==
Year	Title	Role	Director	Notes
1982-1985	Le Petit Théâtre de Bouvard	Various	Nino Monti	TV series
1984	La jeune femme en vert	The servant	Lazare Iglesis	TV movie
1994	Une nounou pas comme les autres	Julie Toronto	Eric Civanyan	TV movie
1995	Amimicalement	The Host	Gilles Amado	TV show
1995	Une nana pas comme les autres	Julie Toronto	Eric Civanyan	TV movie
1997–present	Josephine, Guardian Angel	Joséphine Delamarre	Jean-Marc Seban, Pascal Heylbroeck, ...	TV series (103 episodes); 7 d'Or - Best Actress - Soap or Series (1997); 7 d'Or - Best Actress - Soap or Series (2000); 7 d'Or - Best Actress - Soap or Series (2003)
1998	Famille de coeur	Nadine Lefort	Gérard Vergez	TV movie
1998	Changement de cap	Marilyn	Patrick Malakian	TV movie
2000	Family Pack	Elisa Kessler	Chris Vander Stappen	
2000	Marie et Tom	Marie Bertin	Dominique Baron	TV movie
2004	À trois c'est mieux	Juju	Laurence Katrian	TV movie
2005	La bonne copine	Juliette	Nicolas Cuche	TV movie
2011	Amimicalement	The Host	Pascal Duchêne	TV show
2011	Trois filles en cavale	Vicky Lebel	Didier Albert	TV movie
2013	Link 2	Herself	Daniel Bésikian & Franck Guedj	Short
2017	Le prix de la vérité	Capitaine Marie Jourdan	Emmanuel Rigaut	TV movie
2018	Camping paradis	Joséphine Delamarre	Philippe Proteau	TV series (1 episode)
2018	Demain nous appartient	Pénélope	David Lanzmann, Jérôme Navarro, ...	TV series (5 episodes)
2019	Le prix de la loyauté	Capitaine Marie Jourdan	Emmanuel Rigaut	TV movie
2020	I Love You Coiffure	Madame Plantin	Muriel Robin	TV movie
2020	Call My Agent!	Herself	Marc Fitoussi	TV series (2 episodes)
2022	Le prix de la trahison	Capitaine Marie Jourdan	François Guérin	TV movie
2023	Léo Matteï, brigade des mineurs	Chantal	Hervé Renoh	TV series (2 episodes)

== Theatre ==
Year	Title	Director	Author	Place	Notes
1982-1983	Elle voit des géants partout	Mimie Mathy & Didier Biosca	Jean-Claude Martin	Point Virgule	One-woman show
1985-1986	Mimie en quête d'hauteur	Mimie Mathy & Didier Biosca	Jean-Claude Martin	Théâtre de la Potinière	One-woman show
1988-1990	Existe en trois tailles	Patrick Timsit	Mimie Mathy, Michèle Bernier & Isabelle de Botton	Théâtre de la Michodière	Play
1991-1993	Le Gros N'avion	Éric Civanyan	Mimie Mathy, Michèle Bernier & Isabelle de Botton	Théâtre de la Michodière	Play
1994-1996	Mimie au Splendid	Pierre Palmade	Pierre Palmade	Le Splendid	One-woman show
2002-2004	J'adore papoter avec vous	Roger Louret	Muriel Robin & Mimie Mathy	Théâtre de la Porte Saint-Martin	One-woman show
2013-2015	Je (re)papote avec vous	Roger Louret	Muriel Robin, Mimie Mathy & Jean-Philippe Lemmonier	Théâtre de la Porte Saint-Martin	One-woman show

== Bibliography ==
Year	Title	Author	Publisher
1986	À pas de géant	Mimie Mathy	Carrère
1994	Mimie Mathy	Mimie Mathy	Hachette
2006	Aller simple pour le bonheur	Mimie Mathy & Benoist Gerard	Éditions Plon
2006	Joséphine ange gardien, Tome 1	Mimie Mathy, Galdric & Thierry Robberecht	Jungle
2006	Joséphine ange gardien, Tome 2	Mimie Mathy, Galdric & Thierry Robberecht	Jungle
2007	Joséphine ange gardien, Tome 3	Mimie Mathy, Galdric & Thierry Robberecht	Jungle
2008	Joséphine ange gardien, Tome 4	Mimie Mathy, Galdric & Thierry Robberecht	Jungle
2009	Les vacances africaines de Zouzou et Aï	Mimie Mathy	Éditions Plon
2010	Le Noël magique de Pierrot et Marguerite	Mimie Mathy	Éditions Plon
2010	Djamel et Mégane : même pas peur !	Mimie Mathy	Éditions Plon
2017	Vaut-il mieux être toute petite ou abandonné à la naissance ?	Mimie Mathy & Gilles Legardinier	Belfond
