= Sisters in Law (film) =

Sisters in Law: Stories from a Cameroon Court
- State prosecutor Vera Ngassa, left, and Court President Beatrice Ntuba.
- Directed by: Florence Ayisi; Kim Longinotto
- Produced by: Kim Longinotto
- Starring: Vera Ngassa; Beatrice Ntuba
- Edited by: Oliver Huddleston
- Music by: D'Gary
- Distributed by: Women Make Movies
- Release date: 2005
- Running time: 104 minutes
- Country: Cameroon
- Language: Cameroonian Pidgin English

Sisters in Law is a 2005 Cameroonian documentary film by Florence Ayisi and Kim Longinotto, portraying aspects of women's lives and work within the judicial system in western Cameroon. Following four separate cases, the film focuses on state prosecutor Vera Ngassa and judge Beatrice Ntuba as they attempt to bring justice for victims of gender violence.

== Plot ==
The film centres around four cases in Cameroon involving violence against women. Complainants include Manka, a six-year-old girl who run aways from her abusive aunt's care; Sonita, a 10-year-old girl who accuses her neighbour of rape; and Amina, a Muslim woman who is trying to divorce her husband due to domestic abuse. Their cases are processed and heard by Vera Ngassa, a state prosecutor, and Beatrice Ntuba, a court judge. Manka's aunt pleads guilty and is sentenced to a custodial prison sentence; Sonita's rapist pleads not guilty, but is found guilty by the court; and Amina's husband is fined, with a separate sharia court granting her request for a divorce.

== Production ==
Ayisi and Longinotto were supported by Women Make Movies, who also distributed the film. Ayisi and Longinotto were inspired by Kumba Town in West Cameroon, where Ayisi grew up, and originally envisioned making a film about the local police force, before deciding to follow the judicial system. The film features the case of Amina, which became the first case in Cameroon criminal history where a man was successfully convicted of abusing his wife.

== Release ==
The film was screened at multiple film festivals throughout 2005, including the Cannes Film Festival, Toronto International Film Festival and the Telluride Film Festival. In the US, it aired on the PBS series Independent Lens.

== Reception ==
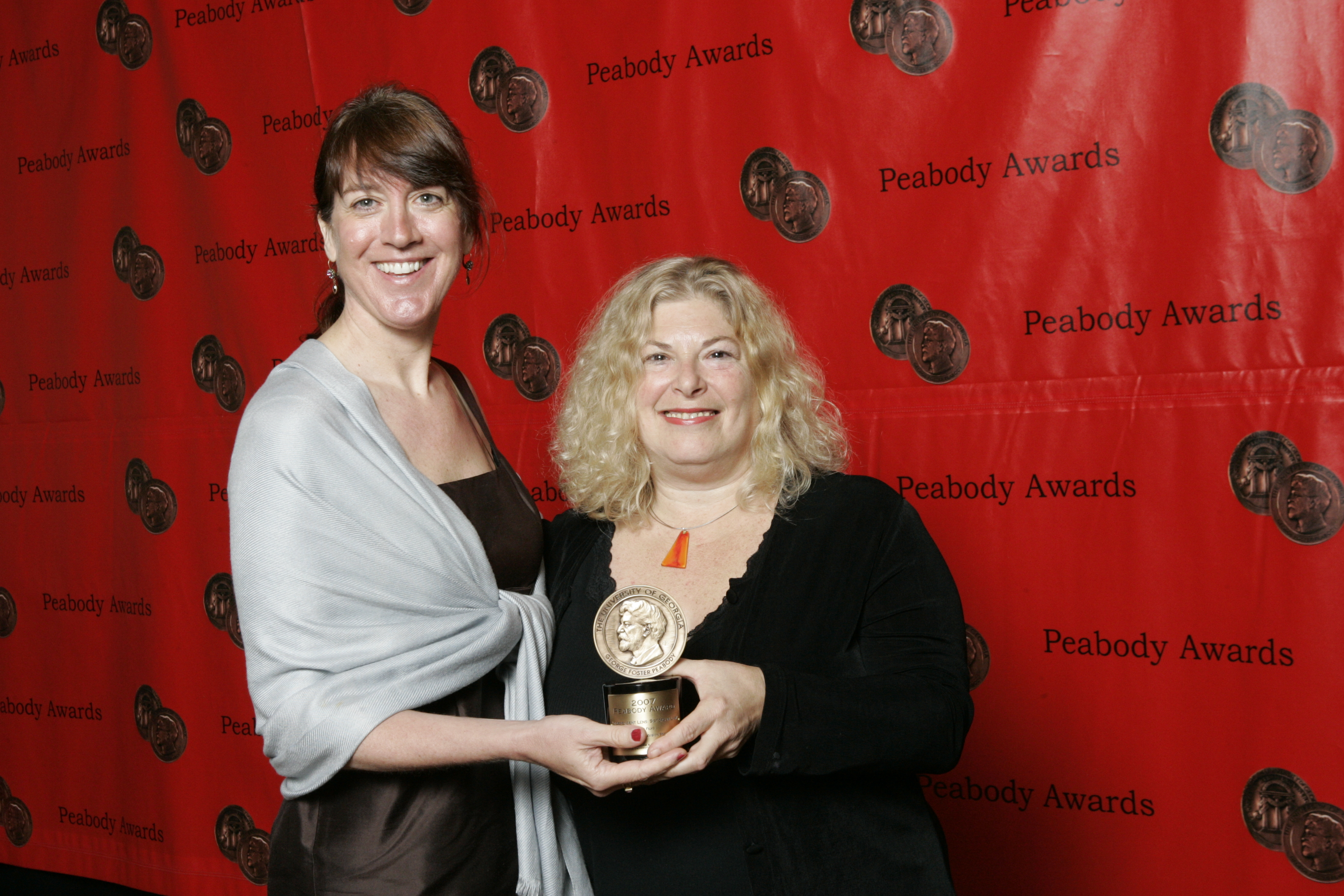
Lois Vossen and Debra Zimmerman at the 67th Annual Peabody Awards for Independent Lens-Sisters in Law

Sisters in Law has won many film awards including the prestigious Prix Art et Essai at the Cannes Film Festival in May 2005, Best Documentary Film at Hawaii International Film Festival, Audience Award at International Documentary Film Festival Amsterdam (IDFA), Best Documentary on a Contemporary issue, Grierson Award, Social Justice Award for Documentary Film at Santa Barbara International Film Festival, Best International Documentary at Real Life on Film Festival, Melbourne and Best Single Documentary, Royal Television Society. In 2007, Sisters In Law won a Peabody Award. It was also nominated for Best British Documentary at the 2005 British Independent Film Awards.

=== Critical response ===
Review aggregator Rotten Tomatoes reports that 92% of 26 critic reviews were positive, with an average rating of 7.1/10. The website's critics consensus reads, "Enlightening, uplifting, and compelling, Sisters in Law takes an unflinching -- and often humorous -- look at efforts to effect legal progress for Muslim women in Cameroon."
