= Sangre (film) =

2005 film

- Directed by: Amat Escalante
- Written by: Amat Escalante
- Produced by: Jaime Romandia
- Starring: Cirilo Recio Dávila
- Cinematography: Alex Fenton
- Edited by: Amat Escalante
- Distributed by: Mantarraya Producciones
- Release date: 11 May 2005
- Running time: 90 minutes
- Country: Mexico
- Language: Spanish

Sangre ("Blood") is a 2005 Mexican drama film directed by Amat Escalante. It was screened in the Un Certain Regard section at the 2005 Cannes Film Festival.

== Plot ==
Diego is a middle-aged man with strabismus whose job is to count the number of people entering a large government building. His wife Blanca works as a food delivery personnel. In the evenings they both spend their time watching soap opera on TV lying on the couch. They eat dinner together and occasionally have sex. One day, while he is having dinner, he receives a call from his young daughter, Karina (from another woman). He asks her to meet him at a plaza and not to call on this phone as he could get into trouble at home. The next day at work, a co-worker, Martita, faints. Her estranged husband has taken her only son to the US without her consent. Colleagues help to get her on her feet. Diego walks with Martita to her house and, while leaving, she hugs him for being there. Blanca, who is passing by on a delivery, happens to see this embrace and misconstrues it. At home, Blanca angrily hurls a stool at Diego as he enters home. After sometime, as Diego is lying on the sofa, Blanca enters home, apologises for being violent and as a loving gesture buys him his favourite dinner for them to eat. Diego seems preoccupied as he lay on the bed, unable to sleep. Next day, Diego meets Karina, who is seeking a place to stay as she is not on good terms with her mother and her boyfriend is a drug addict. Diego cannot allow her to stay to at his house, instead he arranges for her to stay in an inexpensive single room hotel. A friend at the workplace asks him to join them for a game of pool. He politely declines, saying he needs to be with his wife. At the hotel, on repeated knocking of the door and not opening, he enters to find Karina in the bathroom, trying to hold her breath in the bathtub. He asks her not to repeat such acts in the future. At home, Blanca tries to get cozy with her husband, considering him being lost in thought of late, and jerks him off. In the morning, while Blanca takes a break after having cooked for Diego, asks him to overlook the simmering pan, which he forgets to do being lost in thought. In the car Blanca apologises to Diego for yelling and asks him why he is so quiet, Diego asks if he could bring his daughter Karina to stay with them, Blanca refuses, is visibly upset, starts crying and exits the car near her place of work. At the hotel, Diego enters to find his daughter lying dead on the floor. Heartbroken, he goes to work where he is further disturbed when a daughter and aged father are being shown the door by the security guard. He silently starts sobbing. After work, he buys a few stationeries and packs his daughter’s body in a polythene cover and disposes of it in a garbage bin. At home, Blanca is on the floor naked inviting Diego for sex. Diego in this insufferable condition performs the act. In the morning, Blanca wakes up to pass the garbage to the garbage truck. Diego dresses up and follows the garbage truck in his car. He watches the Garbage truck dump the garbage bin in which Diego had disposed his daughter’s body. He follows the truck to the city dump area where they unload all the garbage. As the truck leaves, he is approached by a local trash collector asking if he was looking for anything in particular. He tells him he is looking for his daughter. He walks further down the dump area along a meadow where a group is overlooking a possible brawl where a middle aged man is heavily bleeding and a young man is panting standing next to him, he walks further when he comes across a creek. On the other side, a raw passion fruit drops from a tree, he crosses the creek and plucks all the fruits from the tree and walks back to his car where he drops a fruit on the seat, covers the seat with polythene cover and leaves.

== Cast ==
- Cirilo Recio Dávila as Diego
- Claudia Orozco as Karina
- Martha Preciado as Martita
- Laura Saldaña Quintero as Blanca
