= Family Pack (2000 film) =

2001 film by Chris Vander Stappen

- French: Que faisaient les femmes pendant que l'homme marchait sur la lune?
- Directed by: Chris Vander Stappen
- Written by: Chris Vander Stappen
- Produced by: Catherine Burniaux; François Charlent; Jean-Luc Van Damme; Françoise Vercheval; Jean-Louis Porchet; Gérard Ruey; Claude Veillet; Arlette Zylberberg; Frédéric Bernard
- Starring: Marie Bunel; Hélène Vincent; Mimie Mathy; Tsilla Chelton
- Cinematography: Michel Houssiau
- Edited by: France Duez
- Music by: Ionel Petroï; Frédéric Vercheval
- Production companies: Banana Films; CAB Productions
- Distributed by: Velvet Films; M6 Droits Audiovisuels
- Release date: 12 October 2000
- Running time: 98 min
- Countries: France; Belgium; Canada; Switzerland
- Language: French
- Budget: $2.7 million
- Box office: $386.000

Family Pack (French: Que faisaient les femmes pendant que l'homme marchait sur la lune?, lit. "What Did Women Do When Men Walked on the Moon?") is a 2000 drama film, directed by Chris Vander Stappen.

== Plot ==
July 1969. After two years in Canada, Sacha is back in her small city in Belgium. She has two disruptive news for her family. The first is that instead of being married or at least engaged, she has a lesbian Canadian girlfriend; and the second is not better: instead of studying radiology in Montreal, she abandoned the studies despite the fact that her family had made huge sacrifices.

== Cast ==
- Marie Bunel as Sacha Kessler
- Hélène Vincent as Esther Kessler
- Mimie Mathy as Elisa Kessler
- Tsilla Chelton as Lea
- Macha Grenon as Odile
- Christian Crahay as Oscar Kessler
- Emmanuel Bilodeau as Antoine
- Michel Israel as Jules
- Jacques Lavallée as Louis
- Marie-Lise Pilote as Debbie
- Mario Saint-Amand as Bob

== Production ==
The movie was first screened to the Chicago International Film Festival in 2000. Before it was released, it was also screened to the Turin International Gay and Lesbian Film Festival (Italy), in 2001.

In 2002 it was screened to the Febio Film Festival (Czech Republic) and to the Japan International Gay and Lesbian Film Festival (Japan).

== Accolades ==
Award	Category	Recipient	Result
Chicago International Film Festival	Best Feature	Chris Vander Stappen	Nominated
Festival International du Film Francophone de Namur	Best Film	Chris Vander Stappen	Nominated
Festival International du Film Francophone de Namur	Best Artistic Contribution	Chris Vander Stappen	Won
