= Michèle Bernier =

French actress, writer and director

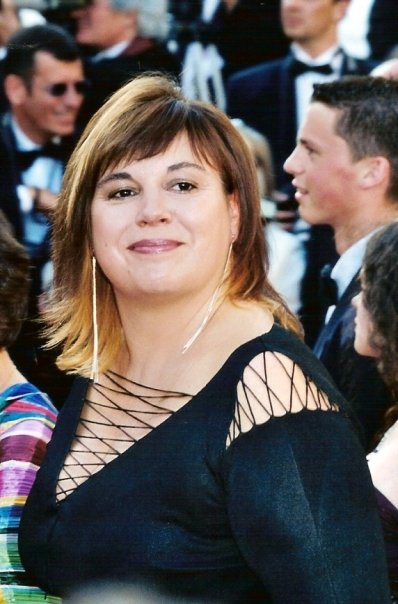
- Born: 2 August 1956 (age 70); Paris, France
- Occupations: Actress, writer, director
- Years active: 1981–present

Michèle Bernier (born 2 August 1956) is a French actress, comedian, writer and director.

== Personal life ==
She is the daughter of Georges Bernier (1929–2005), better known by the name of Professeur Choron and Odile Vaudelle (1934–1985).

From 1982 to 1997, she was in a relationship with the author Bruno Gaccio. They had two children, Charlotte (born in 1987) and Enzo (born in 1997).

== Career ==
After a theatrical training, she joined Le Petit Théâtre de Bouvard with many other comedians. There, she created a female comedy trio, "The Girls," together with Mimie Mathy and Isabelle de Botton.

== Theatre ==
Year	Title	Author	Director	Notes
1988–90	Existe en trois tailles	Mimie Mathy, Michèle Bernier & Isabelle de Botton	Éric Civanyan	Théâtre de la Michodière
1991	Le Gros n'avion	Mimie Mathy, Michèle Bernier & Isabelle de Botton	Éric Civanyan	Théâtre de la Michodière
1994	Bonne Année toi-même	Pauline Daumale	Francis Perrin	
2000–02	The Demon Stirs	Michèle Bernier, Florence Cestac & Marie-Pascale Osterrieth	Marie-Pascale Osterrieth	Théâtre du Gymnase Marie Bell
2001	Les Délichieuses	Nataly Dalhian & Véronique Veran	Michèle Bernier	
2002	Nuit d'ivresse	Josiane Balasko	Josiane Balasko	Théâtre de la Renaissance
2006	Dolores Claiborne	David Joss Buckley	Marie-Pascale Osterrieth	Théâtre des Bouffes-Parisiens
2006	Arrête de pleurer Pénélope 2	Juliette Arnaud, Christine Anglio & Corinne Puget	Michèle Bernier	Théâtre Fontaine
2006	Karine Lyachenko	Karine Lyachenko	Michèle Bernier	Café de la Gare
2009	Moise, Dalida et moi	Isabelle de Botton	Michèle Bernier & Isabelle de Botton	Théâtre des Champs-Élysées
2010	Et pas une ride !	Michèle Bernier & Marie-Pascale Osterrieth	Marie-Pascale Osterrieth	Théâtre de la Renaissance
2010	Le grand jour	Vincent Aze	Michèle Bernier	Le Splendid
2014–15	Je préfère qu'on reste amis	Laurent Ruquier	Marie-Pascale Osterrieth	Théâtre Antoine-Simone Berriau

== Filmography ==
Year	Title	Role	Director	Notes
1981	Le roi des cons	The girl assaulted	Claude Confortès	
1981	Putain d'histoire d'amour		Gilles Béhat	
1981	Comment draguer toutes les filles...	Maryse	Michel Vocoret	
1981	Le boulanger de Suresnes	A Miss	Jean-Jacques Goron	TV movie
1982	Tête à claques	Julie	Francis Perrin	
1984	Le joli coeur	Lisette	Francis Perrin	
1984	Vive les femmes!	Mimi	Claude Confortès	
1985	Le cowboy	The taxi driver	Georges Lautner	
1986	Paulette, la pauvre petite milliardaire	The farmer	Claude Confortès	
1993	Les ténors		Francis De Gueltz	
1995	French Twist	Solange	Josiane Balasko	
1996	L'échappée belle	Madame Lambert	Étienne Dhaene	
1996	Adorable petite bombe	Jacqueline	Philippe Muyl	TV movie
1996	Sans mentir	Nurse	Joyce Buñuel	TV movie
1997	Quand j'étais p'tit	Typhus's mother	Daniel Janneau	TV movie
1997	L'amour dans le désordre	Myriam	Élisabeth Rappeneau	TV movie
1998	Ça reste entre nous	Supermarket casher	Martin Lamotte	
1998	Ivre mort pour la patrie	The mayor's wife	Vincent Hachet	Short
1998	Telle mère, telle fille	The patient	Élisabeth Rappeneau	TV movie
1999	Au bénéfice du doute	Catou	Williams Crépin	TV series
2000	Vive nous!	Annette	Camille de Casabianca	
2000	Deuxième quinzaine de juillet	Monique	Christophe Reichert	
2000	Pique-nique		Eric Théobald	Short
2001	Un gars, une fille	The girl	Francis Duquet	TV series (1 episode)
2002	Les frangines	Noémie	Laurence Katrian	TV movie
2003	The Tulse Luper Suitcases	Sophie van Osterhaus	Peter Greenaway	
2003	Papa maman s'ront jamais grands	Josiane	Jean-Louis Bertucelli	TV movie
2004	San-Antonio	Berthe Bérurier	Frédéric Auburtin	
2004	Les parisiens	Waitress	Claude Lelouch	
2004	Haute coiffure	Martine	Marc Rivière	TV movie
2004	À trois c'est mieux	Coco	Laurence Katrian	TV movie
2005	Le courage d'aimer	Tania	Claude Lelouch	
2005	The Demon Stirs	Anne Cestac	Marie-Pascale Osterrieth	
2005	Vous êtes libre?	Nathalie	Pierre Joassin	TV movie
2005	On ne prête qu'aux riches	Marion	Arnaud Sélignac	TV movie
2005	L'homme qui voulait passer à la télé		Amar Arhab & Fabrice Michelin	TV movie
2005	La famille Zappon	Yvonne Naturlisch	Amar Arhab & Fabrice Michelin	TV movie
2006	L'homme de ta vie	Juliette	Laurence Katrian	TV movie
2006	Commissaire Cordier	Sylvie	Eric Summer	TV series (1 episode)
2006	Louis Page	Alice Bayon	Patrick Poubel	TV series (1 episode)
2007	Roman de Gare	Florence	Claude Lelouch	
2007	Survivre avec les loups	Marthe	Véra Belmont	
2007	Qui va à la chasse...	Micheline	Olivier Laubacher	TV movie
2007	Vérités assassines	Gisèle	Arnaud Sélignac	TV movie
2007	Ali Baba et les 40 voleurs	Yasmina	Pierre Aknine	TV movie
2008	A Man and His Dog	Tram woman	Francis Huster	
2008	Roue de secours	Camille Langlois	Williams Crépin	TV movie
2008	Marie et Madeleine	Soeur Suzanne	Joyce Buñuel	TV movie
2008	Les poissons marteaux	Marion	André Chandelle	TV movie Luchon International Film Festival – Best Actress
2009	Le temps est à l'orage		Joyce Buñuel	TV movie
2009	Le bourgeois gentilhomme	Madame Jourdain	Christian de Chalonge	TV movie
2009	Myster Mocky présente	Herself	Jean-Pierre Mocky	TV series (1 episode)
2010	Thelma, Louise et Chantal	The bride	Benoît Pétré	
2010	Fais danser la poussière	Alice	Christian Faure	TV movie
2010	Tombé sur la tête	Mathilde	Didier Albert	TV movie
2010	Colère	Gina Esteban	Jean-Pierre Mocky	TV movie
2011	Crédit pour tous	Madame Rombaldi	Jean-Pierre Mocky	
2011	Trois filles en cavale	Joëlle Dessources	Didier Albert	TV movie
2012	Paradis amers	Françoise	Christian Faure	TV movie
2012	Scènes de ménage	Françoise	Karim Adda & Francis Duquet	TV series (1 episode)
2012–14	La smala s'en mêle	Isabelle Garnier	Didier Grousset, Thierry Petit, ...	TV series (7 episodes)
2013	Le vivant-mort	The official	Maxime Ropars	Short
2013	Il faut marier maman	Dany	Jérôme Navarro	TV movie
2014	Pas d'inquietude	Vera	Thierry Binisti	TV movie
2015	La stagiaire	Constance Meyer	Christophe Campos	TV movie
