= Pater (film) =

2011 film

- Film poster
- Directed by: Alain Cavalier
- Produced by: Michel Seydoux
- Starring: Alain Cavalier; Vincent Lindon
- Release date: 18 May 2011 (Cannes)
- Running time: 105 minutes
- Country: France
- Language: French

Pater is a 2011 French drama film directed by Alain Cavalier. It premiered In Competition on 17 May at the 2011 Cannes Film Festival.

== Plot ==
Cavalier and Lindon play versions of themselves, starting work on a film in which they will play the president of the republic and a politician who will be prime minister, respectively.

Though improvised conversations, they sketch out both their fictional and actual relationships.

Cavalier's President character calls on Lindon's Prime Minister character to pass a law on the maximum salary at the national level. The project met with strong opposition and the two men can not muster a majority of MPs behind the project. Having the feeling of not being sufficiently supported by the President, Lindon decides to run for president himself.

== Cast ==
- Vincent Lindon as Vincent Lindon
- Alain Cavalier as Alain Cavalier
- Bernard Bureau as Bernard Bureau

== Production ==
Pater was shot with a handheld digital camera

Cavalier said "The year of working together changed us [...] I wasn’t in charge the way a director is in charge. And we discovered things gradually. I used to plan the last shot from the start, and thought about that from the beginning. I had studied Greek tragedy, I was influenced by films like Renoir's Partie de campagne and John Huston's Asphalt Jungle. Now I want to forget all that."

The film was made with a skeleton script and cast. "I didn’t write one line of dialogue, just a sketch, nine pages, about how I met Vincent, and how we decided to work together, how I would film." Cavalier said the film is "about the intimacy of power and how it is like the intimacy of making a movie together, without a cast, without a classical team."

== Themes ==
The New York Times described the film as "an improvised adventure, a game of Let’s Pretend with a political twist, with scenes of the two picnicking in the forest on a gourmet feast, plucking the proper ties and suits from vast closets, and talking of cabbages and kings, as it were — and of how they feel about women."

== Reception ==
=== Critical response ===
On Rotten Tomatoes, the film has 3 reviews, 1 positive and 2 negative.

Variety described it as the "epitome of an in-joke, best appreciated by director Alain Cavalier and his slender cast, Pater is a confounding slog for most anyone else. Curiously tapped for a Cannes competition slot, this sloppily improvised film about filmmaking doesn't bother to make clear whether and how it's a mock-docu account of the shooting of a French prime minister biopic, as Cavalier cavalierly squanders the chance to represent his meta-narrative in stylistically coherent terms."

Peter Bradshaw of The Guardian wrote: "It is a very verbose film - yet with interesting things to say."

The A.V. Club gave it a grade of "D+", saying: "I didn’t get it, and neither did any other American I spoke to, but the French were applauding madly throughout, apparently in response to policy statements. Director and star have an easy rapport, but that’s all I got out of it, I’m afraid."
