= Blandine Yaméogo =

Burkinabé actress (born 1960)

- Born: Blandine Yaméogo; 1960 (age 65–66); Burkina Faso
- Occupations: Actress, choreographer, composer
- Years active: 1995–present

Blandine Yaméogo (born 1960), is a Burkinabé actress. She has acted in critically acclaim films La nuit de la vérité, Delwende and Notre étrangère. Apart from filmmaking, she is also a choreographer and composer.

== Filmography ==
Year	Film	Role	Genre	Ref.
1995	Keita! L'héritage du griot	Sogoton	Film	
2000	Mouka	Actress, Composer	Short film	
2004	La nuit de la vérité (The Night of Truth)	Woman Painter	Film	
2005	Delwende	Actress: Napoko, choreographer	Film	
2006	Djanta		Film	
2009	Danse sacrée à Yaka		Film	
2010	Notre étrangère (The Place in Between)	Acita	Film	
2011	Bayiri, la patrie	Zalissa	Film	
2012	Zamaana, il est temps		Film	
