= Le filmeur =

2005 film

- Directed by: Alain Cavalier
- Written by: Alain Cavalier
- Produced by: Michel Seydoux; Fabienne Vonier
- Cinematography: Alain Cavalier
- Release date: 21 September 2005
- Running time: 97 minutes
- Country: France
- Language: French

Le filmeur (lit. 'The Filmmaker') is a 2005 French drama film directed by Alain Cavalier. It was screened in the Un Certain Regard section at the 2005 Cannes Film Festival.

== Cast ==
- Christian Boltanski as himself
- Danielle Bouilhet as herself
- Camille de Casabianca as herself (archive footage)
- Alain Cavalier as himself
- Bernard Crombey as himself
- Philippe Daveney as himself
- Caroline Laval as herself
- Thérèse Martin as herself
- Alexandre Widhoff as himself
- Françoise Widhoff as herself
