= Florence Ayisi =

Cameroonian filmmaker and academic (born 1962)

- Ayisi at SVAFF in 2026
- Born: 1962 (age 63–64); Kumba
- Citizenship: Cameroon
- Occupations: Filmmaker, University teacher, Academic, Film director

Florence Ayisi (born in on 22 July 1962) is a filmmaker from Cameroon. Her film Sisters in Law was released in 2005, winning the Prix Art et Essai award at the Cannes Film Festival and a Peabody.

== Biography ==
Ayisi was born 22 July 1962 in Kumba, Cameroon. She earned a certificate in higher education in 1997 from the School of Education at the University of Sunderland. In 1989, she earned a BA from the University of Yaoundé in Cameroon. In 1989, she earned a MA in theatre and media production from the University of Hull and, in 1992, she earned an MA in film production from the Northern School of Film and Television at Leeds Metropolitan University.

Since 2000, Ayisi has taught film at the University of South Wales. Ayisi founded the production company Iris Films in 2005.

In 2005, she released her film Sisters in Law, which went on to win multiple awards, including the Prix Art et Essai award at the Cannes Film Festival and a Peabody. The film received positive reviews.

In 2007, she met Queen Eliszabeth II for her work's association with Commonwealth countries. In 2008, she won the UK Film Council Breakthrough Brits Award for Film Talent in 2008.

== Filmography ==
- Zanzibar Soccer Dreams (Florence Ayisi & Catalin Brylla, 2016, 64 mins) -
- Transforming Lives: PNDP and Rural Development in Cameroon (2014, 35 mins)
- Handing Down Time – Cameroon (2012, 55 mins)
- Cameroonian Women in Motion (2012, 10 mins)
- Art of this Place: Women Artists in Cameroon (2011, 40 mins)
- Zanzibar Soccer Queens (2007/2008, 87 & 52 mins)
- Our World in Zanzibar (2007, 35 mins)
- My Mother: Isange (2005, 7 minutes)
- Sisters in Law (2005) (Florence Ayisi & Kim Longinotto, 2005, 104 mins)
- Reflections (2003)
