= Claude Confortès =

French director and actor

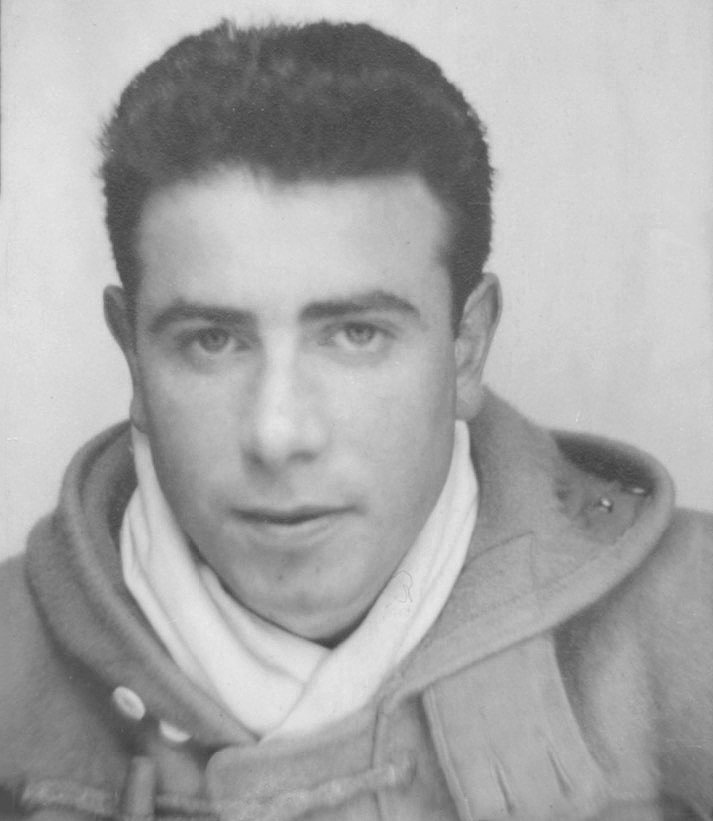
Claude Confortes

Claude Confortès (28 February 1928 – 15 June 2016) was a French director for stage and film and actor. As an actor, he starred in Yves Robert's War of the Buttons (La Guerre des boutons) in 1962, and played a supporting role in Germinal in 1993.

Confortès was also known as a comedy film director.
