= Sexuality and gender identity–based cultures =

Variety of communities and subcultures

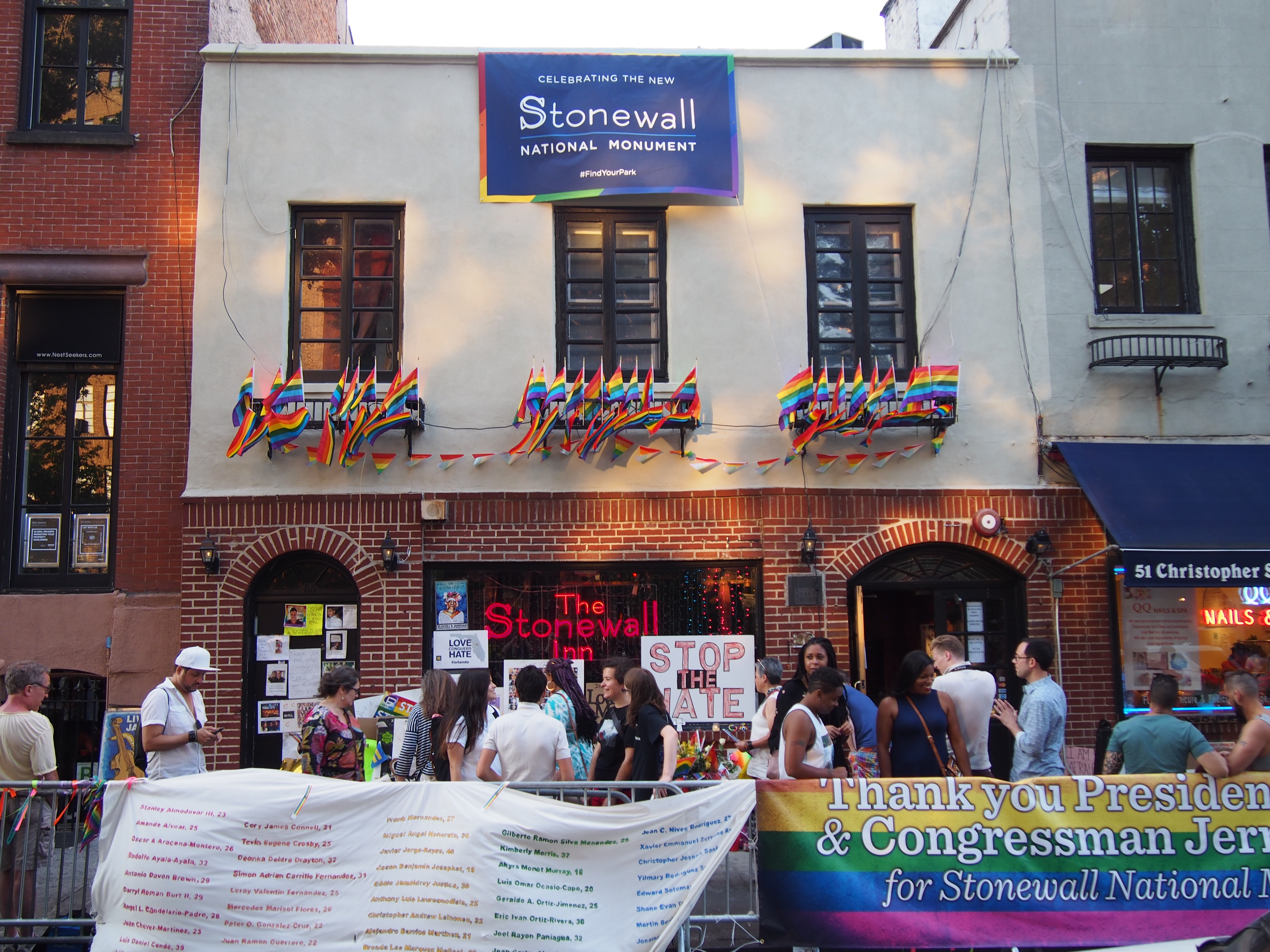
The Stonewall Inn in the gay village of Greenwich Village, Manhattan, site of the June 1969 Stonewall riots, is the most popular LGBTQ pilgrimage destination worldwide and is adorned with rainbow pride flags, the main symbol of LGBTQ culture.

Sexuality and gender identity-based cultures are subcultures and communities composed of people who have shared experiences, backgrounds, or interests due to common sexual or gender identities. Among the first to argue that members of sexual minorities can also constitute cultural minorities were Adolf Brand, Magnus Hirschfeld, and Leontine Sagan in Germany. These pioneers were later followed by the Mattachine Society and the Daughters of Bilitis in the United States.

Not all individuals of various gender and sexual orientations self-identify with or participate in a particular subculture. Reasons include geographic distance, unawareness of the subculture's existence, fear of social stigma, or personal preference for privacy. Some have suggested that the identities defined by the Western heterosexualized cultures are based on sexuality that have serious flaws and often limit public discussion. The lack of inclusive spaces can lead to individuals rejecting who they are and ignoring their own sexual needs. This rejection can lead to people being classified under sexual identities that doesn't feel representative to them as a person.

== LGBTQ+ culture ==
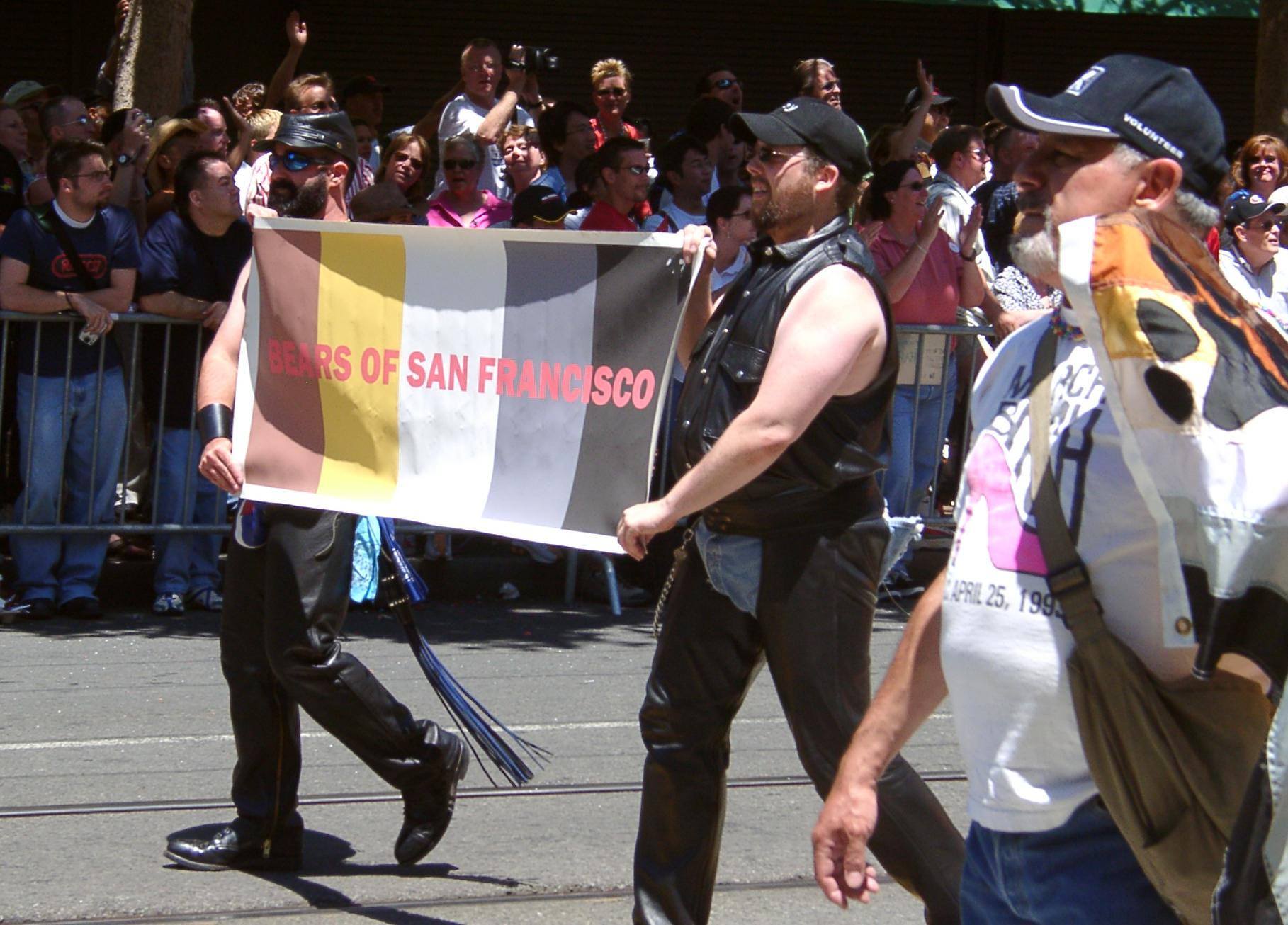
The Bear community is a subculture within the LGBTQ community

Pride flag of the Bear community, one of many flags for sexuality and gender identity-based cultures

LGBTQ+ culture is the shared culture among people who identify as Lesbian, Gay, Bisexual, Transgender, Queer, and related identities, encompassing both sexual and gender minorities.

LGBTQ+ is occasionally referred to as "queer culture" or "gay culture", but the latter term can also be specific to gay men's culture.

LGBTQ culture varies widely by geography and the identity of the participants. Elements often identified as being common to the culture include:

- The work of famous gay, lesbian, bisexual and transgender people. This may include:
  - Present-day LGBTQ artists and political figures.
  - Historical figures who have been identified as LGBTQ. It has often been questioned whether it is appropriate to identify historical figures using modern terms for sexual identity (see History of sexuality). However, many LGBTQ people feel a kinship towards these people and their work, especially to the extent that it deals with same-sex attraction or gender identity.
- An understanding of the history of LGBTQ political movements.
- An ironic appreciation of things linked by stereotype to LGBTQ people.
- Figures and identities that are present in the LGBTQ community and LGBTQ culture, this could include the gay village, drag kings and queens, LGBTQ pride, and the rainbow flag.

In some cities, especially in North America, gay men and lesbians tend to live in certain neighbourhoods that celebrate or support their community.

LGBTQ communities organize a number of events to celebrate their culture, such as Pride parades, the Gay Games and Southern Decadence.

In recent years, the LGBTQ+ acronym has expanded to the more inclusive but lesser-known LGBTQIA+ form, which recognizes intersex and asexual identities.

The inclusion of the intersex category in the acronym is debated. Some argue against its inclusion because it could transform the intersex category into an issue of gender and sexuality comparable to LGBT issues, thus driving attention away to matters related to physical traits and medical mismanagement. Others argue for its inclusion because it is what raises awareness of it to a wider audience and creates a central culture for others to gather around.

== Polyamory ==
The infinity heart is a widely used symbol of polyamory.

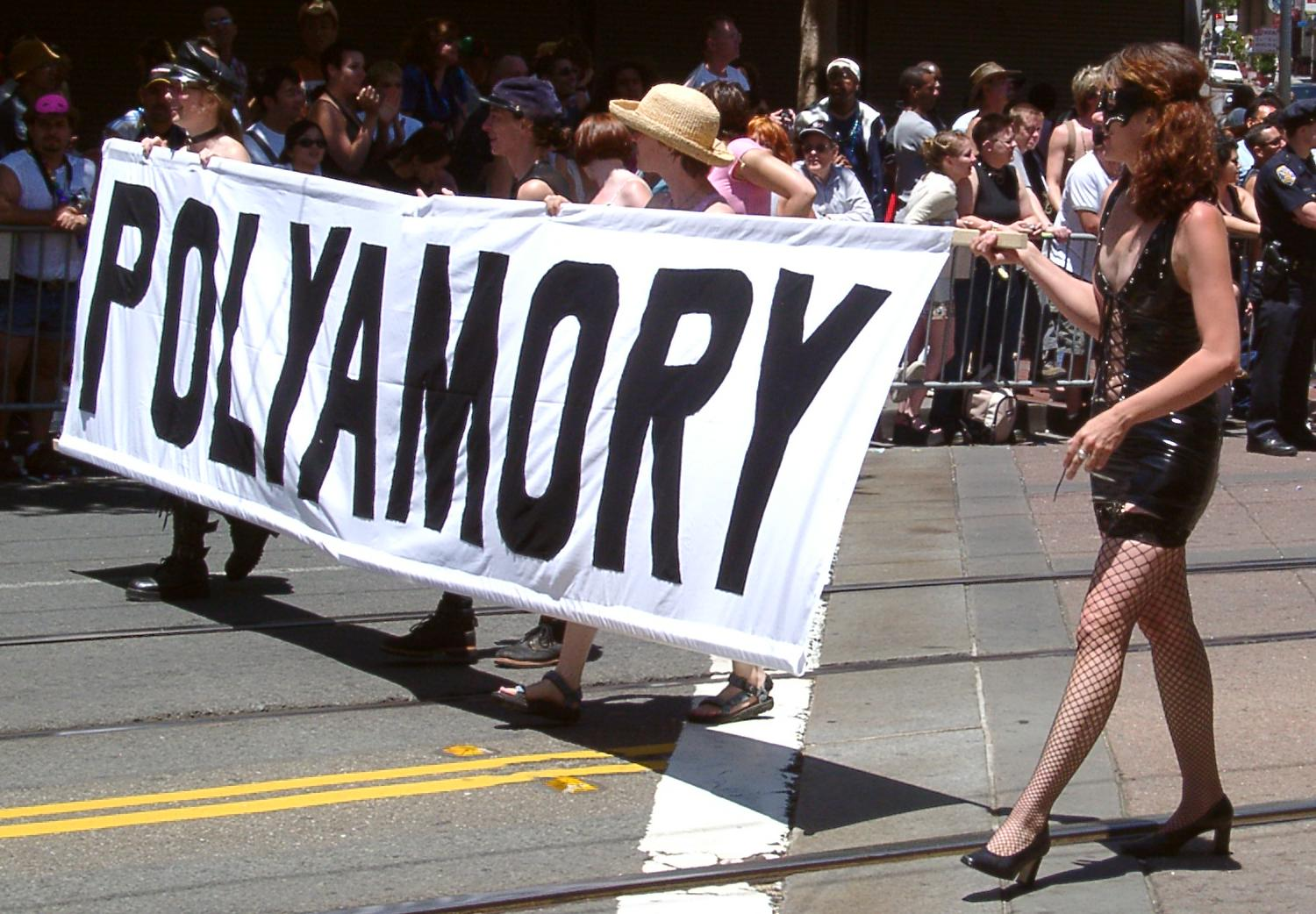
Representatives of the polyamory community at a San Francisco parade.

Polyamory is the practice and associated culture of engaging in more than one consensual romantic relationship at the same time. It is sometimes associated with polysexuality, the attraction to multiple genders, though distinct in its own way. Polyamory can occur in a social group, culture, or group of people specific to a certain gender-identity or sexual orientation. In some cultures the practice of forming multiple simultaneous romantic relationships is controversial.

Polygamy (a practice that overlaps heavily with polyamory) is the practice of legally marrying more than one person. It is against the law to marry more than one person in the United States; however, there are some countries around the world where polygamy and/or polyamorous relationships are not unusual. For example, it is not uncommon in many middle eastern cultures for men to have multiple wives. This type of polyamorous relationship is known as polygyny, whereas the opposite, in which women have multiple husbands, is called polyandry.

The illegal status of multiple marriages in many parts of the world has not stopped the formation of communities and sub-cultures that practice polyamory and informal polygamy. There are several accounts of attempted private polygamist communities in Western Europe and North America. However, these communities, for the most part, have eventually disbanded. In Western culture there are few examples of widespread acceptance of polyamory. This does not mean that polyamorous relationships in Western culture (and subcultures) do not exist. In the United States it is estimated that polyamory is practiced by 4-5% of the population. Polyamory exists mainly as isolated instances in which those in relationships have made agreements with their significant other(s).

== Sexual fetish-based cultures ==
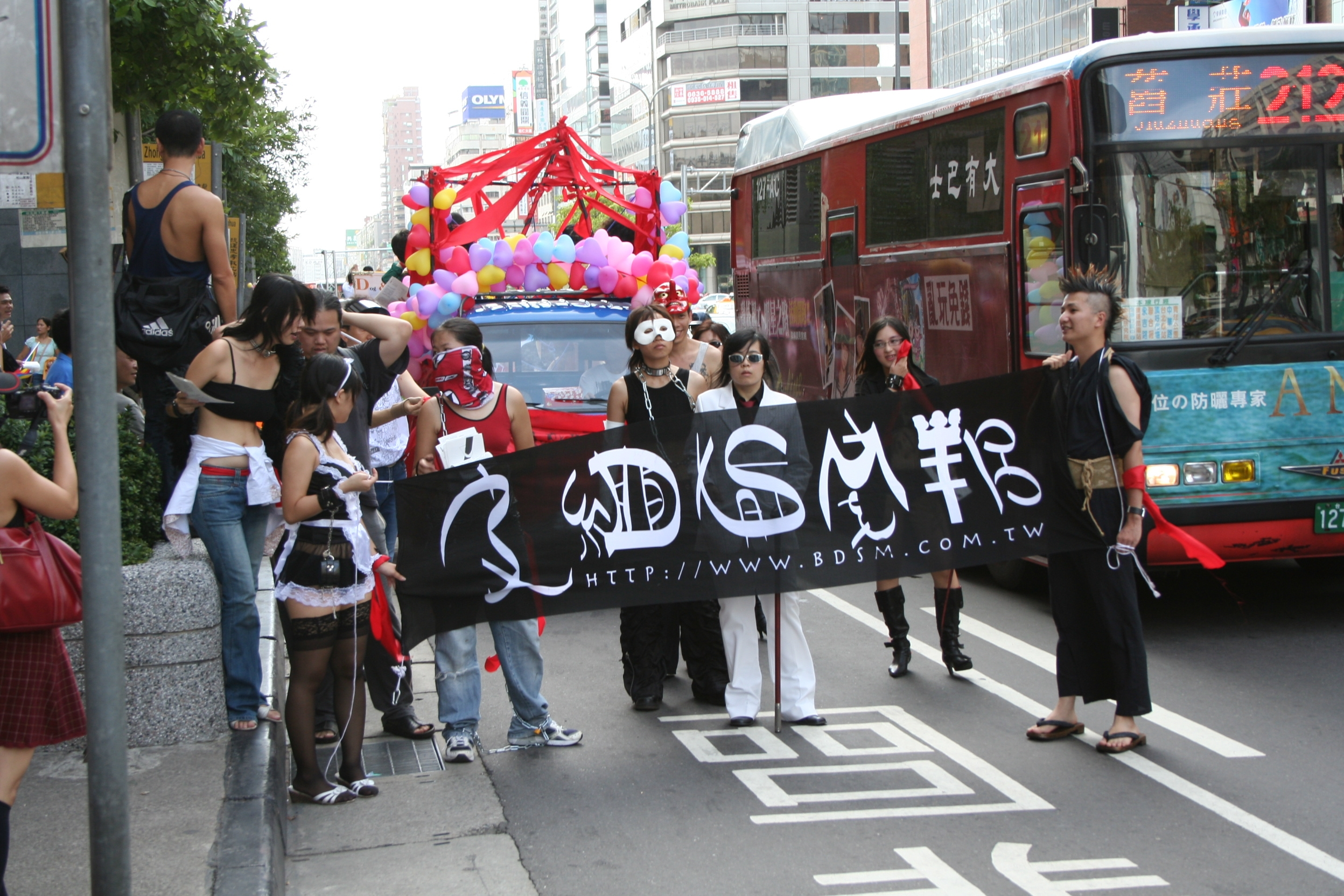
BDSM activists in Taiwan

The fetish subculture comprises people who share interests in a broad range of sexual fetishes and other paraphilias. Alternative terms for the fetish subculture include fetish scene and fetish community.

This subculture often has a strong nightclub scene, in the form of fetish clubs.

Some of the most common paraphilias seen in the fetish subculture include BDSM, leather fetishism and rubber fetishism. The subculture itself allows for people to come together and share their common interests in regards to sexual fetishes, allowing for a safe and supportive environment.

While fetish culture is often stigmatized, research shows that these communities can also serve as inclusive spaces where sexual and gender expression are freely explored. For many in the LGBTQ+ community, BDSM practices can encourage empowerment and self-acceptance while challenging heteronormative views of gender and sex. Participating in kink communities can also strengthen connectedness, healing, and self-exploration, as well as interpersonal skills through an emphasis on consent and communication that reinforces safety and mutual respect. However, barriers still exist within the kink community, such as limited access to affirming healthcare, racism, ableism, and geographic inaccessibility.

== Influence on Western culture ==
In recent years, sexual minority cultures influenced parts of mainstream culture.

The latter half of the 20th century’s mainstream culture was characterized by the film industry. Previous to the civil rights movements from the 1960s to 70s, homosexuality was not depicted in films. It was banned in the Motion Picture Production Code from 1930 to 1960. Even when it was shown in films, homosexuality was associated with violent and criminal characters, such as in the 1980 film Cruising.

However, during the civil rights movement, certain films and their portrayals of queer sexuality and gender showed positive shifts in attitudes towards queer people. The documentary Word Is Out depicted queer people in mundane settings in the home, presenting them in everyday circumstances and showing their normality. The documentary and several other films at the time showed queer people as “normal” and “respectable” characters instead of the previous violent criminals.

Yale sociology professor Joshua Gamson argues that the tabloid talk show genre, popularized by Oprah Winfrey in the 1980s provided a much needed, high impact media visibility for sexual minorities and did more to make gay culture mainstream than any other development of the 20th century. Slang frequently originates in subcultures, including sexual minority subcultures, which becomes part of the larger vernacular.

People's perceptions of gender and sexuality are influenced by the growing media representation of the LGBTQ+ community in pop culture, music, and television. According to research, LGBTQ individuals can become more prideful and accepting of their identities by being exposed to positive LGBTQ media figures like Ellen DeGeneres and television shows like Will & Grace and The L Word. Stereotypical or negative portrayals reinforce stigma and negative narratives, whereas positive representation has been reported to be influential and affirming. Media visibility strengthens community and identity, while also fostering acceptance and normalization of LGBTQ+ individuals.

== Non-Western cultures ==
=== Southeast Asia ===
In 2006, the Thai film Rainbow Boys produced by Vitaya Saeng-aroon, depicted a contemporary gay relationship. Vitaya also produced the comedy-drama Club M2, set in a gay sauna. The significance of his work was attributed to the exposure of LGBTQ communities in a culturally conservative society. Another 2007 film, Bangkok Love Story, directed by Poj Arnon, was critically hailed as a departure from the stereotyped view of homosexuals as transvestites and transsexuals.

These filmmaker's made breakthroughs with their films as other scholars and public authors also began to bring the issue of gender and stereotypes to the forefront in contemporary culture. In many countries, homosexuality and bisexuality are widely accepted and often legal, although often still face discrimination and criticism. In this context, "queer youth are often cast as victims of homophobic violence or heterosexist exclusion in ways that inscribe them within tropes of victimization and risk."

=== East Asia ===
Unlike European cultures which are primarily based in Christian religion and have a history of anti-LGBT laws, the Chinese culture was much more open about non-exclusive, non-heterosexual relationships. Though there were still restrictions in the ancient Chinese culture, homosexual relations have been documented since early historical periods. There were recordings of subcultures of prostitute/actors in existence; however, even in modern-day Chinese culture, there are those who are opposed to homosexual/bisexual relationships and lifestyles. In the People's Republic of China, "Reportedly, Mao Zedong believed in the sexual castration of 'sexual deviants', but little is known about the Communist Chinese government's official policy with regards to homosexuality prior to the 1980s.

In Japan, many Japanese have adopted a wide range of sexual identity, and space has always existed for non-dominant gender roles in Japanese society. The modern era, however, has made more room for those openly varied gender roles. Before Western contact, Japan did not have a system of identification in which one's identity was determined by one's biological sexual preference (see Sexual minorities in Japan). Yet, hegemonic and culturally exalted notions of how men and women should behave are still strong in the country, same as in the Western cultures.

Earlier studies on sex roles and gender identities in Asia focused heavily on particular constraints felt by women, for "'[Japanese] models of citizenship implicitly privilege the male, white-collar 'citizen in a suit.'" Constraints are also felt, however, on the males in Asian societies who are held at a higher standard due to the "dominant paradigm" referred to as "hegemonic masculinity". "Masculinity" has a history and is actually not only expressed differently in different societies but also differently within societies throughout eras. Masculinity, even in traditional Asian cultures is, so called, plural. Still, certain forms of masculinity (and femininity for that matter) become particularly privileged, the hegemonic masculinity.

== Activism and advocacy ==
=== Early movements ===
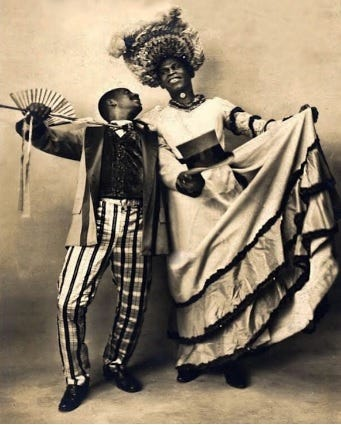
Two black men actors, one dressed in drag.

LGBTQ+ activism in the United States can be traced back to William Dorsey Swann, the first known person to openly identify as a "queen of drag." In the late 1800s, Swann organized one of the earliest documented LGBTQ+ gatherings, where attendees, primarily men, dressed in women's clothing, marking an early form of organized resistance against discrimination. In 1924, Henry Gerber, a German immigrant and early gay rights advocate, founded the Society for Human Rights in Chicago, one of the first organizations in the U.S. dedicated to advancing homosexual rights. Gerber wrote about homosexual oppression in an attempt to build solidarity and advocate for the community.

In 1950, activist Harry Hay founded the Mattachine Society, one of the earliest enduring LGBTQ+ rights organizations in the U.S. The society worked to raise awareness, educate members, and connect the pursuit of social justice with LGBTQ+ rights. In 1955, Del Martin and Phyllis Lyon established the Daughters of Bilitis, the first organization in the U.S. devoted specifically to lesbian advocacy, providing support, and promoting visibility for lesbian women.

=== Gay liberation movement (1969-1980s) ===
In 1969, police raided the Stonewall inn gay bars, which sparked the Stonewall riots and then a slew of LGBT protests for the next two decades aiming to end discrimination against gay people. Gay activism rose exponentially, and this time period was called the Gay Liberation movement.

After the Stonewall riots, The Gay Liberation Front was created as an activist group seeking to take more assertive approaches to LGBT activism around the world. Organizations were formed and protests occurred in many countries around the world

In 1984, the International March on the United Nations for Gay and Lesbian Freedom took place where protestors marched from Sheridan Square to Dag Hammarskjold Plaza across from the UN in a demonstration to demand an end to discrimination against gays and lesbians.

=== Recent developments and political backlash ===
In the United States there has been a rise in political backlash towards LGBTQ activism. During Trump's first presidency he implemented policies such as the transgender military ban and the rollback of nondiscrimination protections impacting both queer and transgender populations. This moment emphasized the limitations of earlier advocacy that focused on assimilation including marriage equality and military inclusion. These efforts often favored white, cisgender, and middle-class people while excluding other minority groups. Scholar Zein Murib argues for a more intersectional, community-oriented approach to activism: an approach that recognizes how race, class, immigration status, and gender identity structure LGBTQ life. LGBTQ advocacy continues to shift with political and cultural environments with ongoing debate on how inclusion and representation may shape the future.

=== LGBTQ+ organizations ===
Numerous organizations emerged in the 20th and 21st centuries to advance LGBTQ+ rights globally. The Human Rights Campaign (HRC) and Lambda Legal are U.S. organizations focused on advancing legal protections and promoting social acceptance for LGBTQ+ individuals, particularly those who are transgender, people of color, or living with HIV, to ensure they are recognized as full and equal citizens. International Lesbian, Gay, Bisexual, Trans, and Intersex Association (ILGA) campaigns for freedom and equality for all, regardless of sexual orientation or gender identity, across continents. OutRight Action International supports LGBTQ+ individuals in restrictive regions, engaging in advocacy, providing legal aid for asylum seekers, and leading crisis interventions for LGBTQ+ communities.

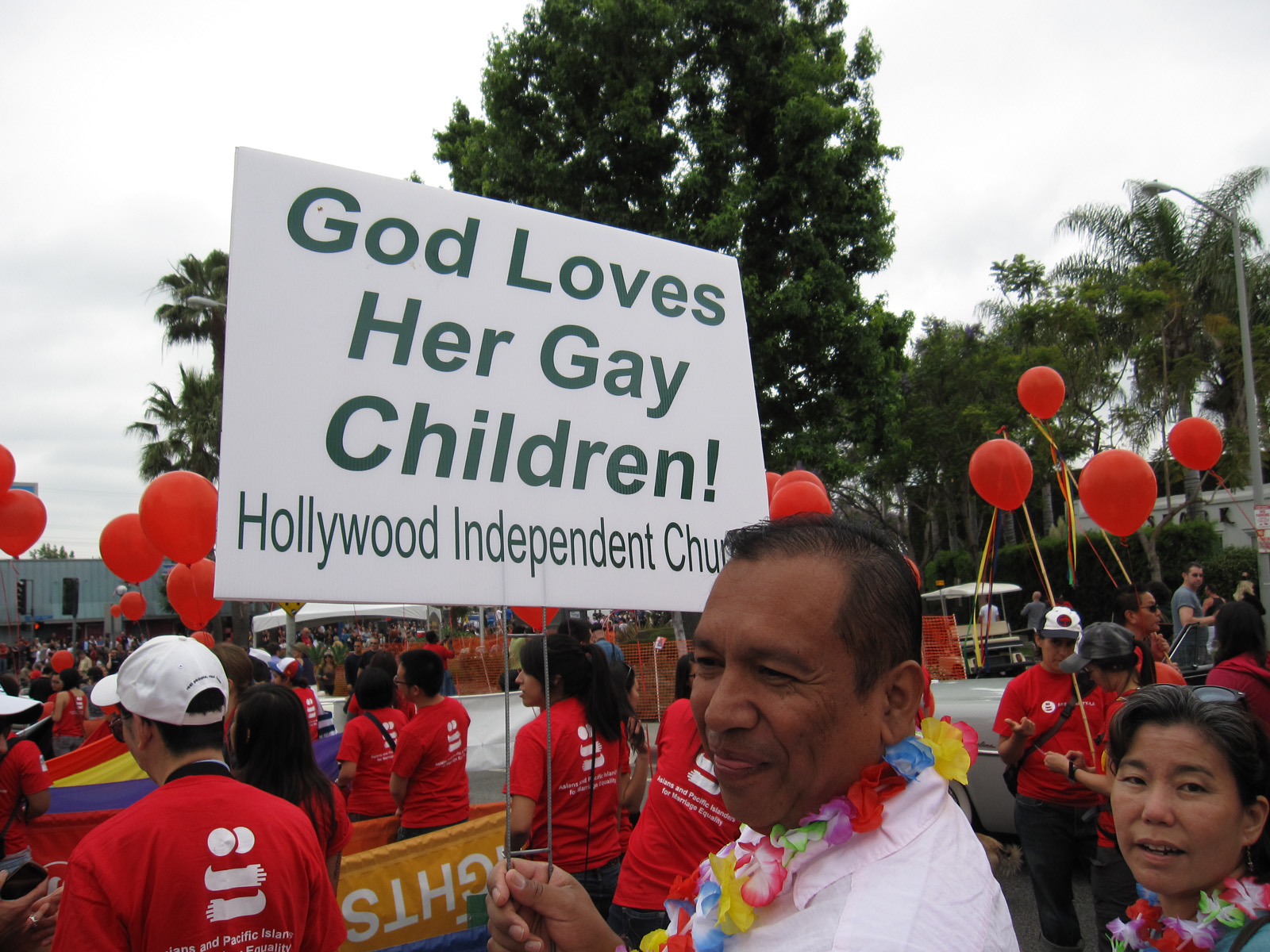
Pan-Asian delegation march in Los Angeles 2011 to support LGBT rights in Asian communities of Southern California

== See also ==
- Asexuality
- Bisexuality
- Gay community
- Gay village
- Sexual diversity
- Non-westernized concepts of male sexuality
- LGBTQ history in China
- LGBTQ history
- LGBTQ rights in Taiwan
- LGBTQ social movements
- Polyamory
- Queer
- Separatism
- Sexual minorities in Japan
- Sexual orientation
- Third gender
- Travesti (gender identity)
