= Rosto =

Dutch artist and filmmaker (1969–2019)

Rosto (14 February 1969 – 7 March 2019), was a Dutch artist and filmmaker best known for his award-winning short film trilogy and online graphic novel Mind My Gap. Rosto is the founder and owner of Studio Rosto A.D, a film production company, animation studio and atelier in Amsterdam, the Netherlands.

== Early life ==
Born as Robert Stoces, his first shorts (the rise and fall of the legendary) Anglobilly Feverson (2002) and Jona/Tomberry (winner of the Grand Prix Canal+ at the 2005 Cannes Film Festival) were screened at many international festivals and brought him worldwide recognition. These short films were part of Mind My Gap, a mixed media project that started with an online graphic novel (now concluded on www.mindmygap.com), and continued with music and print as well as films. A retrospective of the films and related work has been presented at several international festivals, including The Museum of Modern Art in Ljubljana in 2015.

The Monster of Nix (2011) was the most ambitious project. The 30 minute animated musical took six years to produce and had an impressive voice cast including Terry Gilliam, Tom Waits, The Residents and The Dø. The film, which is dedicated to Rosto's son Max, was theatrically released in the Netherlands and Belgium, won numerous awards and was screened at many festivals.

In 2008, No Place Like Home was released. It was the first of a tetralogy of short films concerning the music and characters of the music project Thee Wreckers. Lonely Bones started its successful festival life at the International Film Festival Rotterdam in 2013 and won the grand prix at the 2013 Ottawa International Animation Festival. Like his other films, Bones was also distributed in Dutch cinemas and has been broadcast by television stations in several countries. Splintertime (2015) is Rosto's third in a series of four films featuring his music project Thee Wreckers. Reruns (2018) completes this Thee Wreckers Tetralogy.

== Death ==
Rosto died on 7 March 2019. He was survived by his wife, British film animator Suzie Templeton and their two children, a son and daughter, Max and Rosie Templeton

== Filmography ==
- Mind My Gap – online graphic novel – (1998–2014)
- Beheaded (1999)
- (the rise and fall of the legendary) Anglobilly Feverson (2002)
- Jona/Tomberry (2005)
- Big White/Big Black (2006)
- Thee Wreckers: No Place Like Home (2008)
- The Monster of Nix (2011)
- Thee Wreckers: Lonely Bones (2013)
- Thee Wreckers: Splintertime (2015)
- Thee Wreckers: Reruns (2018)

== Published ==
- Rosto A.D's Mind My Gap Short Film Trilogy Extravaganza (DVD) – 2005, published by Chalet Pointu, Paris.
- The Monster of Nix (DVD) – 2012, published by Studio Rosto A.D/Autour de Minuit.
