= Kim Longinotto =

British documentary film maker (born 1948)

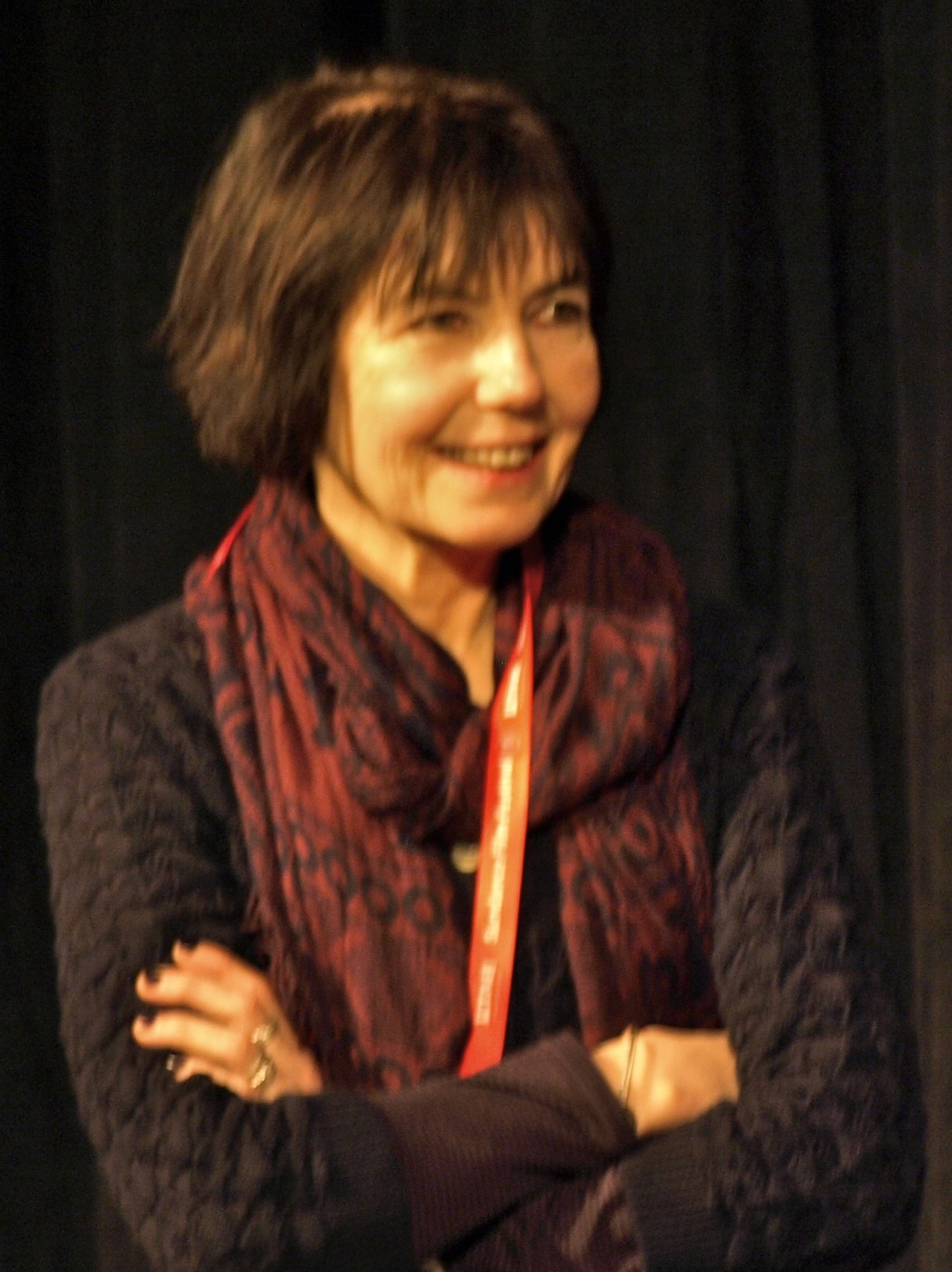
- Born: Sally Anne Longinotto-Landseer; 8 February 1948 (age 78); London, England
- Other name: Kimona Landseer
- Education: Essex University; National Film and Television School
- Occupations: Director; producer; cinematographer
- Years active: 1976–present

Kim Longinotto (née Sally Anne Longinotto-Landseer; born 8 February 1948, London) is a British documentary film maker, well known for making films that highlight the plight of female victims of oppression or discrimination. Longinotto has made more than 20 films, usually featuring inspiring women and girls at their core. Her subjects have included female genital mutilation in Kenya (The Day I Will Never Forget, 2002), women standing up to rapists in India (Pink Saris, 2010), and Salma (2013), the story of an Indian Muslim woman who smuggled poetry out to the world while locked up by her family for decades.

== Early life ==
Born Sally Anne Longinotto-Landseer to an Italian father and a Welsh mother on 8 February 1948; her father was a photographer who later went bankrupt. At the age of 10, she was sent to an all-girls boarding school, where she found it hard to make friends due to the mistress forbidding anyone to talk to her for a term after she became lost during a school trip.

She discovered that her double-barreled "Landseer" surname was made-up so she dropped it and just kept Longinotto, adopting a new forename (Kim or Kimona). After a period of homelessness, she went to Essex University, where she studied English literature and writing. She later followed friend and future filmmaker Nick Broomfield to the National Film and Television School.

While studying, Longinotto made Pride of Place, a documentary about her boarding school that was shown at the London Film Festival.

== Career ==
Longinotto is an observational filmmaker. Observational cinema, also known as direct cinema, free cinema or cinema verite, usually excludes certain documentary techniques such as advanced planning, scripting, staging, narration, lighting, re-enactment and interviewing.

She runs a production company, Vixen Films, which she founded in 1988 with Claire Hunt under the name Twentieth Century Vixen Productions.

== Filmography ==
- Pride of Place (1976) – Director/Camera (as Kimona Landseer)
- Theatre Girls (1978) – Director/Cinematographer
- Cross and Passion (1981) – Director (with Claire Pollak)
- Underage (1982) – Director/Cinematographer
- Eat the Kimono (1989) – Director/Cinematographer
- Hidden Faces (1990) – Director/Cinematographer
- The Good Wife of Tokyo (1992) – Director
- Dream Girls (1994) – Director/Cinematographer/Producer
- Shinjuku Boys (1995) – Director/Cinematographer/Producer
- Rock Wives (1996) (TV) – Director / Camera
- Divorce Iranian Style (1998) – Director / Camera
- Gaea Girls (2000) – Director/Cinematographer/Producer
- Runaway (2001) – Director/Cinematographer
- The Day I Will Never Forget (2002) – Director/Cinematographer
- Sisters in Law (2005) – Co-director (with Florence Ayisi)/Cinematographer/Producer
- Hold Me Tight, Let Me Go (2007) – Director/Cinematographer/Producer
- Rough Aunties (2008) – Director/ Cinematographer
- Pink Saris (2010) – Director/Camera
- Salma (2013) – Director / Camera
- Love Is All (2014) – Director
- Dreamcatcher (2015) – Director/Camera
- Shooting the Mafia (2019) – Director/Camera/Cowriter
- Dalton's Dream (2023)

== Awards ==
- Shinjuku Boys (1995) was judged Outstanding Documentary at the San Francisco Gay and Lesbian Film Festival.
- Divorce Iranian Style (1998) won the Grand Prize for Best Documentary San Francisco International Film Festival and the Silver Hugo Award at the Chicago International Film Festival.
- Runaway (2001) received the Children Rights Award (Filmpreis für Kinderrechte) at the Unabhängiges Filmfest Osnabrück
- The Day I Will Never Forget (2002) was awarded the Amnesty International DOEN Award at IDFA and Best Doc UK Spotlight at Hot Docs.
- Sisters in Law (2005) won the Prix Art et Essai and Special Mention Europa Cinemas at the Cannes Film Festival in 2005.
- Rough Aunties (2008) won the World Cinema Grand Jury Prize at the Sundance Film Festival and was in the official selection for Sheffield Doc/Fest 2009.
- Pink Saris (2010) won the Special Jury Award at Sheffield Doc/Fest 2010, where Longinotto also won the Inspiration Award, a trophy given to a figure in the documentary world who has championed the medium.
- Dreamcatchers (2015) received the Voice of a Woman (VOW) Award for Documentary
