= New half =

Japanese term referring to feminine men and transgender women

New half (ニューハーフ) is a Japanese culture-bound term to refer to people assigned male at birth who exhibit stereotypically effeminate behaviours, mannerisms, and/or styles of dress.

== Overview ==
The term is commonly used commercially in Japan to refer to settings such as drag, club performers and sex workers, though not all applicable individuals consider themselves 'new half'. The term may also be used to refer to transgender women.

Japan has a variety of related terms of varying social acceptability and perceived pejorativeness, including (ミスターレディ) 'mister lady', 'blue boy', (フェムボーイ) 'otokonoko', 'onee', 'okama' and so on. In particular, 'new half' is comparable to the English pejorative or sex work term 'shemale' and is sometimed translated directly as such.

== History ==
In historical Japan, it was not unheard of for those assigned male at birth to play female roles in performing arts, such as kabuki. In the Edo period, some performers assigned male at birth would also carry out customer service and sex work through a female presentation. In the 1970s, 'transvestite clubs' began to form, and by the 1980s the term 'new half' had emerged to refer to their members. A common urban rumour is that the 'new half' term first originated in a broadcast conversation between singer-songwriter Keisuke Kuwata and drag host Betty of the Betty's Mayonnaise club.

By the 1990s, wider knowledge and understanding of concepts of gender dysphoria and transgender identity had begun to emerge among the population. There was some effort to move away from the older 'new half' term towards more standardised terms.

Awareness and recognition of the transgender community has continued to increase up until modern day, and to an extent Japanese transgender people can access general workplaces rather than being relegated to water trade (including sex work). Despite this, many still face social stigma, and some estimates put the transgender suicide rate in Japan as double that of the cisgender population.

== Medical and legal status ==
As with other transgender populations, the level of cosmetic, social or medical procedures sought varies on an individual basis. In Japan, individuals diagnosed with gender dysphoria who have changed their name may apply to have their officially recognised gender marker amended.
