= Alain Cavalier =

French film director

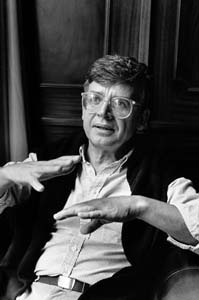
- Born: 14 September 1931 (age 95); Vendôme, Loir-et-Cher, France
- Occupation: Film director
- Years active: 1957–present

Alain Cavalier (French: [kavalje]; born 14 September 1931) is a French film director.

== Biography ==
Cavalier was born in Vendôme, Loir-et-Cher and studied film at the Institut des hautes études cinématographiques. He won several awards, including the César Award for Best Film and César Award for Best Director for his film Thérèse in 1987. His film Pater premiered In Competition at the 2011 Cannes Film Festival.

He was married to the French film actress and former Miss France winner Irène Tunc.

== Filmography ==
- 1958 : Un Américain (court métrage)
- 1962 : Le Combat dans l'île
- 1964 : L'Insoumis
- 1967 : Mise à sac
- 1968 : La Chamade
- 1976 : Le Plein de super
- 1979 : Ce répondeur ne prend pas de message
- 1979 : Martin et Léa
- 1981 : Un étrange voyage
- 1986 : Thérèse
- 1987 : 24 portraits d'Alain Cavalier (1ère partie)
- 1991 : 24 portraits d'Alain Cavalier (2ème partie)
- 1993 : Libera me
- 1996 : La Rencontre
- 1998 : Georges de la Tour (documentaire)
- 2000 : Vies
- 2001 : René
- 2004 : Le Filmeur
- 2005 : Bonnard (moyen-métrage)
- 2007 : Les Braves (documentaire)
- 2007 : Lieux saints (moyen-métrage)
- 2009 : Irène
- 2009 : Sept gouttes de sommeil (moyen-métrage)
- 2011 : Pater
- 2014 : Le Paradis
- 2015 : Le Caravage
- 2017 : Six portraits XL
- 2019 : To Be Alive and Know It
- 2022 : L'Amitié
