= Onabe =

Japanese derogatory term

Onabe (お鍋, おなべ, literally "cooking pan") is slang referring to transgender men and trans-masculine non-binary people within Japan. Originating in the 1970s, onabe used to refer to a "maid servant", but later came to be used as a female counterpart for okama, a derogatory term for gay men and transgender women.

Historically, the definition of the word is disputed.

== Host culture ==
The term onabe is often associated with host club culture. They act like normal host clubs targeted towards women and are paid to flirt, socialize and drink with woman patrons. These host clubs are called "onabe bars" or "nabe bars".
