= Mantarraya Productions =

- Company type: Private
- Genre: Motion pictures
- Founded: 1998
- Founder: Jaime Romandia; Pablo Aldrete
- Headquarters: Mexico City, Mexico
- Website: www.mantarraya.com

Mantarraya Productions is an independent cinema production company funded in 1998. On their web page they define Mantarraya as; "... works as a platform for a new generation of filmmakers and has earned a reputation for promoting new talent".

NDMantarraya is the label they use for distribution (in association with Nodream Cinema company of film director Carlos Reygadas), and NDM is the international sales company label.

Mantarraya Productions is known for their risky content on their films. They are the Mexican production company with the most international film awards in the last 50 years. Since 2002 they participated eight times in different sections of the Cannes Film Festival and their parallel sections; six times in the "Official Selection", four of them in the Competition and two more in "Un Certain Regard", also they have been invited 2 times to the Directors' Fortnight a parallel section of Cannes Film Festival.

The Mexican Academy choose Heli to represent Mexico for the 2014 Oscars Award.

== Spontaneous generation ==
In 2005 Mantarraya participated with two of their productions in the "Official Selection" at the Cannes Film Festival, unusual for an independent production. That year they participated with Battle in Heaven by Carlos Reygadas invited to the Competition and Sangre by Amat Escalante who was invited to Un Certain Regard where the film was honored by the FIPRESCI Award.

In 2005 the French newspaper Le Monde referred to them as: "Mexique, la génération spontanée".

In 2007 they repeated this achievement as they were invited with two other of their productions, Silent Light by Carlos Reygadas who received the Jury Prize in the Competition of the "Official Selection" and La Influencia by Pedro Aguilera that premiered at the Fortnight sidebar of the Cannes Film Festival.

== Cannes awards ==
- 2002 Japón by Carlos Reygadas receives a "Special Mention" for the Caméra d'Or
- 2005 Sangre by Amat Escalante is awarded the Fipresci Award. The last time a Mexican production had been honored with this award at the Cannes Film Festival was given to the film "Cada vez mas Lejos" by Luis Alcoriza back in 1965.
- 2007 Silent Light by Carlos Reygadas receives the Jury Prize. It is the first time in history that a Mexican director (Carlos Reygadas) receives the Jury Prize at Cannes. This recognition has been received by directors like; Ingmar Bergman, Michelangelo Antonioni, Robert Bresson, Costa-Gavras, Krzysztof Kieślowski, Ken Loach, Lars von Trier, Manoel de Oliveira and David Cronenberg among others.
- 2012 Post Tenebras Lux by Carlos Reygadas receives the Award for "Best Director".
- 2013 Heli by Amat Escalante receives the Award for "Best Director". For the second time in a row and third time in history a Mexican director receives this award. In 2012 Carlos Reygadas and in 2006 was received by Alejandro González Iñárritu with his film Babel. This recognition has been also received by directors like; Luis Buñuel, Robert Bresson, Ingmar Bergman, François Truffaut, Costa-Gavras, Terrence Malick, Werner Herzog, Andrei Tarkovsky, Martin Scorsese, Wim Wenders, David Lynch, Pedro Almodóvar, Wong Kar-wai and Michael Haneke among others.

== Venice awards ==
- 2016 The Untamed by Amat Escalante receives the Award for "Best Director".

== Filmography ==
Year	Original title	English title	Director	Duration	World premiere	Notable awards or nominations
2016	La Region Salvaje	The Untamed	Amat Escalante	90 min	Venice Film Festival "Competition" "Official Selection"	Best Director (Venice Film Festival)
2013	Heli	Heli	Amat Escalante	105 min	Cannes Film Festival "Competition" "Official Selection"	Best Director (Cannes Film Festival); Representing México for the Oscar Awards
2013	Halley	Halley	Sebastian Hofmann	80 min	Rotterdam Film Festival – Competition; Sundance Film Festival	
2012	Post Tenebras Lux	Post Tenebras Lux	Carlos Reygadas	110 min	Cannes Film Festival "Competition" "Official Selection"	Best Director (Cannes Film Festival)
2010	Alamar	To the Sea	Pedro Gonzalez-Rubio	73 min	Toronto International Film Festival	Tiger Award (Rotterdam Film Festival)
2010	Río de Oro	River of Gold	Pablo Aldrete	100 min	Toulouse Film Festival "Competition"	Nominated to the Golden Star / Grand Prix Award
2010	Flores en el Desierto	Flowers in the Desert	Jose Alvarez	71 min	Morelia Int. Film Festival	Best Documentary Morelia Int. Film Festival
2009	El Arbol	The Tree	Carlos Serrano	71 min	San Sebastián Film Festival	Nominated to the Mayahuel de Oro (Guadalajara Film Festival)
2008	Los Bastardos	Los Bastardos	Amat Escalante	90 min	Cannes Film Festival "Un Certain Regard" "Official Selection"	Best Film "(Morelia Film Festival)"
2007	La Influencia	La Influencia	Pedro Aguilera	110 min	Directors' Fortnight "Parallel Section"; Cannes Film Festival	Premio Edad de Oro (Cinedecuverts Bruselas)
2007	Luz Silenciosa (aka Stellet Litch)	Silent Light	Carlos Reygadas	145 min	Cannes Film Festival "Competition" "Official Selection"	Best Director (Cannes Film Festival); 5 Ariel Awards (Mexican Academy), including "Best Film"; Representing México for the Oscar Awards; Spirit Award Nominations (Best Foreign Film)
2005	Sangre	Sangre	Amat Escalante	90 min	Cannes Film Festival "Un Certain Regard" "Official Selection"	FIPRESCI Award (Festival de Cannes)
2005	Batalla en el Cielo	Battle in Heaven	Carlos Reygadas	97 min	Cannes Film Festival "Competition" "Official Selection"	FIPRESCI Award (Rio Film Festival)
2005	Nippon e Yokoso	Nippon e Yokoso	Pablo Aldrete	75 min		
2002	Japón	Japón	Carlos Reygadas	130 min	Directors' Fortnight "Parallel Section"; Cannes Film Festival	Special Mention" Caméra d'Or; Cannes Film Festival
