= Esiri =

Esiri is a name predominantly used by the Urhobo people of the Niger-Delta region of Nigeria. It can either be a forename or surname. You also have it in compound names e.g. Esiri-Okotete. Notable people with the surname include:

- Arie Esiri, Nigerian photographer and filmmaker, twin brother of Chuko Esiri
- Allie Byrne Esiri (born 1967), English actress and writer
- Chuko Esiri, Nigerian filmmaker and screenwriter, twin brother of Arie Esiri
- Justus Esiri (1942–2013), Nigerian actor
- Sidney Onoriode Esiri (born 1980), better known as Dr SID (Dr Sid), Nigerian singer-songwriter
