= 2026 New York Film Festival =

64th edition

- Official poster by Marcel Dzama
- Opening film: Paper Tiger
- Closing film: 14th
- Location: New York City, United States
- Founded: 1963
- Hosted by: Film at Lincoln Center
- Artistic director: Dennis Lim
- Festival date: September 25 – October 12, 2026
- Website: https://www.filmlinc.org/nyff/

New York Film Festival
- 2027 2025

The 64th New York Film Festival took place from September 25 to October 12, 2026, in New York City, presented by Film at Lincoln Center.

The festival's official poster was designed by the Canadian contemporary artist Marcel Dzama, and is mainly influenced by Georges Méliès's A Trip to the Moon (1902), Loie Fuller's Serpentine dance (circa 1890s).

James Gray's crime-drama film Paper Tiger was the opening night film. Tony Gilroy's drama-musical film Behemoth! was the festival's centerpiece. While Ava DuVernay's documentary film 14th was the closing night film.

Starting with this year's edition, in the Spotlight Gala section, the festival will present "NYFF Encounters", an annual commissioning program that invites a filmmaker with a film selected for the Main Slate to create an original short film during the course of the festival. The program's first production is South of Tehran, directed by the Brazilian filmmaker Kleber Mendonça Filho, which follows the Iranian filmmaker Jafar Panahi during the release of It Was Just an Accident at the 2025 edition.

Appearing in the NYFF's "Main Slate" for the first time are: Andrey Zvyagintsev, Arie Esiri and Chuko Esiri, Arthur Harari, Chris Rock, David Greaves, Emmanuel Marre, Isabelle Stever, Mani Haghighi, Marine Atlan, Markus Schleinzer, Nicolás Pereda, Sandra Wollner, Sompot Chidgasornpongse, Tizza Covi and Rainer Frimmel, and Tony Gilroy.

The festival's world premieres included: Ava DuVernay's 14th, Paul Thomas Anderson's Cameron Winter at Carnegie Hall, Jonathan Glazer's Joy of Joys, Kleber Mendonça Filho's South of Tehran, Luca Guadagnino's Artificial, Mani Haghighi's I Deserve a Lover Whose Every Rise Sets Fiery Dooms Raging Across the Skies, Takashi Yamazaki's Godzilla Minus Zero, Tom McCarthy's A Statement, and Tony Gilroy's Behemoth!, among others.

== Official Selections ==
=== Main Slate ===
The Main Slate selection committee is led by NYFF's Artistic Director Dennis Lim, and includes Florence Almozini, Justin Chang, and Rachel Rosen. The line-up was announced on August 5. Yuval Abraham and Rachel Szor's NAZA was added on August 25, while Luca Guadagnino's Artificial was added on September 1.

The following films were selected:

English Title	Original Title	Director(s)	Production Country
9 Temples to Heaven	9 วัด สู่สวรรค์	Sompot Chidgasornpongse	Thailand, Singapore, France, Norway, China, Hong Kong, Indonesia, Qatar
14th (closing film)		Ava DuVernay	United States
All of a Sudden	Soudain / 急に具合が悪くなる	Ryusuke Hamaguchi	France, Japan, Germany, Belgium
Artificial		Luca Guadagnino	United States, United Kingdom, Italy
Behemoth! (centerpiece)		Tony Gilroy	United States
Bitter Christmas	Amarga Navidad	Pedro Almodóvar	Spain
Clarissa		Arie Esiri and Chuko Esiri	United States, Nigeria, Egypt
Dao		Alain Gomis	France, Guinea-Bissau, Senegal
The Day She Returns	그녀가 돌아온 날	Hong Sang-soo	South Korea
The Diary of a Chambermaid	Le Journal d'une Femme de Chambre	Radu Jude	France, Romania
Double Freedom	La Libertad Doble	Lisandro Alonso	Argentina, Chile, Luxembourg, Germany, Italy, Uruguay, United Kingdom
The Dreamed Adventure	Das Geträumte Abenteuer	Valeska Grisebach	Germany, France, Austria, Bulgaria
Everything Else Is Noise	Lo demás es ruido	Nicolás Pereda	Canada, Germany, Mexico
Everytime		Sandra Wollner	Austria, Germany
Fatherland	Ojczyzna	Paweł Pawlikowski	Poland, France, Italy, Germany
La Gradiva		Marine Atlan	France, Italy
I Deserve a Lover Whose Every Rise Sets Fiery Dooms Raging Across the Skies	مرا عاشق چنان باید که هر باری که برخیزد قیامت‌های پرآتش ز هر سویی برانگیزد	Mani Haghighi	Iran
I Rarely Wake Up Dreaming	Selten wache ich träumend auf	Isabelle Stever	Germany, Ukraine
The Loneliest Man in Town	Wiener Blues – The Loneliest Man in Town	Tizza Covi and Rainer Frimmel	Austria
A Long Winter		Andrew Haigh	Canada, United Kingdom
The Man I Love		Ira Sachs	United States, France
A Man of His Time	Notre Salut	Emmanuel Marre	Belgium, France
Minotaur	Минотавр	Andrey Zvyagintsev	France, Latvia, Germany
Misty Green		Chris Rock	United States
My Undesirable Friends: Part II – Exile		Julia Loktev	United States
My Wife Cries	Meine Frau weint	Angela Schanelec	Germany, France
NAZA		Yuval Abraham and Rachel Szor	United Kingdom
Nowhere to Lay My Eyes	눈둘데가 없네	Hong Sang-soo	South Korea
Once Upon a Time in Harlem		William Greaves and David Greaves	United States
Paper Tiger (opening film)		James Gray	United States, Brazil, Italy
Possible Love	가능한 사랑	Lee Chang-dong	South Korea
Rose		Markus Schleinzer	Austria, Germany
Tender Loving Care		Mike Leigh	United Kingdom
The Unknown	L'Inconnue	Arthur Harari	France, Italy

=== Spotlight ===
Film at Lincoln Center announced Godzilla Minus Zero as the section's Gala selection on August 4, the section's full line-up was announced on August 11. The Spotlight Shorts program will be fully presented in 35mm at the Walter Reade Theater, and includes 3 world premieres. Paul Thomas Anderson's Cameron Winter at Carnegie Hall was added to the line-up on August 31, with the film being presented in 35mm, followed by Nathan Fielder and Lance Oppenheim's You Can See Everything on September 10.

The following films were selected:

English Title	Original Title	Director(s)	Production Country
Bucking Fastard		Werner Herzog	Ireland, United States
Cameron Winter at Carnegie Hall		Paul Thomas Anderson	United States
Club Kid		Jordan Firstman	United States
The Debut		Jesse Eisenberg	United States
Edward Said: Between Worlds		Maiken Baird	United States
Fjord		Cristian Mungiu	Romania, Norway, Denmark, Finland, France, Sweden
Godzilla Minus Zero (Spotlight Gala)	ゴジラ-0.0(マイナスゼロ)	Takashi Yamazaki	Japan
Iron Boy	Le Corset	Louis Clichy	France, Belgium
Joy of Joys		Jonathan Glazer	United Kingdom
Making Marie Antoinette		Eleanor Coppola	United States
One More Time		Cindy Kleine and André Gregory	United States
The Only Living Pickpocket in New York		Noah Segan	United States
Sixteen Moments of My Life	Seize moments de ma vie	Albert Serra	France, Spain
A Statement		Tom McCarthy	United States
You Can See Everything		Nathan Fielder and Lance Oppenheim	United States
Spotlight Shorts
Masao Adachi Takes a Passport Photo	足立正生、パスポート写真を撮る	Kamal Aljafari	Germany, France, Japan
South of Tehran (NYFF Encounters)		Kleber Mendonça Filho	Brazil, United States
A Stolen Movie	Una película robada	Camilo Restrepo	Colombia
Torino Shadow	都灵之影	Jia Zhangke	China, Italy
Screening Room (1968–2026)		Morgan Fisher	United States
New York Shorts
The People's Beach		J. Wortham	United States
ee		Heather Landsman	United States
The House Call		Eliza Barry Callahan	United States
New York Never Let Me Down		Charlotte Wells	United States
A Woman’s Place Is Everywhere		Fanny Texier	United States

=== Currents ===
The section's full line-up was announced on August 13. It includes 5 world premieres: Tala Hadid's Bardi, Éric Baudelaire's For the Moon, Carlos Reygadas' Heil Jupiter!, Tiffany Sia's Overt Listening, and Dan Sallitt's What Can't Be Mentioned. Alongside the premiere of a new restoration of Fred Camper's Suicide Note (1976–1984), which will be screen in 16mm.

The following films were selected to the Currents section:

English Title	Original Title	Director(s)	Production Country
At Night		Beatrice Gibson	United Kingdom, France
Bardi (currents' centerpiece)		Tala Hadid	Morocco, France, Qatar
A Day in the Life of Jo: Chapter Phaedra	Mia Mera sti Zoi tis Tzo: Kefalaio Fedra	Jacqueline Lentzou	Greece
Foreign Travel	Auslandsreise	Ted Fendt	Germany
For the Moon	Car la lune	Éric Baudelaire	France
Hanabi		Ana Vaz	France, Brazil
Heil Jupiter!		Carlos Reygadas	Mexico, Poland, Portugal, Norway, Sweden
Life of Jorge Luis Borges	Biografía de Jorge Luis Borges	Mariano Llinás	Argentina
London		Sebastian Brameshuber	Austria
Overt Listening		Tiffany Sia	United States, Austria, Germany
Red Rocks	Les Roches Rouges	Bruno Dumont	France, Belgium, Italy, Portugal, Spain
The Remotes		John Torres	Philippines
Suicide Note (1976–1984)		Fred Camper	United States
Tomorrow a Long Time Ago	Morgen vor langer Zeit	Luise Donschen	Germany
What Can't Be Mentioned		Dan Sallitt	United States

==== Currents Shorts ====
Divided in 6 thematic programs, the following short films were selected:

English Title	Original Title	Director(s)	Production Country
Program 1: The Hidden Dimension
Branching Streams Flow in the Darkness		Yixuan Zhang	United States, China
Chronicle of Tiredness	Crónica del cansancio	Natalia Marín	Spain
A Correspondence		Josh Weissbach and Ben Balcom	United States
Harmony (1991)		Tatsu Aoki	United States
Rebecca's Mess		Jamie Crewe	United Kingdom
Program 2: The Visible Invisible
The End (1992)	Վերջը	Artavazd Peleshyan	Armenia
Fevers		James Richards	Germany
Forever…Forever		Johann Lurf	Austria, France
Screening Room (1968–2026)		Morgan Fisher	United States
Program 3: Surface Noise
Day One		Cameron Worden	United States
Flim Flam		Siegfried A. Fruhauf	Austria
Interwoven Intervals		Laura Kraning	United States
Moored Shadow		Karissa Hahn	United States
Practice Towards Light	빛을 향한 수행	Jonathan Seungjoon Lee	South Korea
Procedures		Simon Liu	Hong Kong, United States
Program 4: The Real World
Certainties		Calum Walter	United States
Moon Palace	月宫	Jiaqi Yu	China, United States
Placeholder		Jesse McLean	United States
RW-LO		Martine Syms	United States
Program 5: The Material Ghost
Elegy for the Forgotten, On an Endless War	مرثیه‌ای برای فراموش‌شدگان، در باب جنگی بی‌پایان	Bani Khoshnoudi	Iran, France
The Flesh of the Mountain		Adam Piron	United States
National Seating		Kevin Jerome Everson	United States
The Wayfinders		Peggy Ahwesh	United States
Program 6: Out of the Present
Another Earth		Ben Russell	France
Morne Fortune		Mara Chavez and Doris Duhennois	Austria, Saint Lucia, Martinique, United Kingdom
This Suffocating Now		Vika Kirchenbauer	Germany
They're Here		Laura Poitras and Rachel Lauren Mueller	United States

=== Revivals ===
The Revivals section celebrates works that have been restored, preserved, or digitally remastered. The section's line-up was announced on August 18, it includes the North American premiere of the 4K restoration of The Devils (1971) in a 35mm screening.

The following films were selected:

English Title	Original Title	Director(s)	Production Country
Amma Ariyan (1986)	അമ്മ അറിയാന്‍	John Abraham	India
The Devils (1971)		Ken Russell	United Kingdom, United States
The Drift (1962)	La Dérive	Paula Delsol	France
Gone to Earth (1950)		Michael Powell and Emeric Pressburger	United Kingdom
Goodbye South, Goodbye (1996)	南國再見,南國	Hou Hsiao-hsien	Taiwan, Japan
In Which Annie Gives It Those Ones (1989)		Pradip Krishen	India
The Innocent (1976)	L'innocente	Luchino Visconti	Italy, France
Just Like Weather (1986)	美國心	Allen Fong	Hong Kong
Nitrate Kisses (1992)		Barbara Hammer	United States
A Spring for the Thirsty (1965-1987)	Криниця для спраглих	Yuri Ilyenko	Soviet Union
Suicide Note (1976–1984)		Fred Camper	United States
Yesterday Girl (1966)	Abschied von gestern	Alexander Kluge	West Germany
Peleshyan Project: Program 1
The Land of the People (1966)	Մարդկանց երկիրը	Artavazd Peleshyan	Soviet Union
Mountain Patrol (1964)	Լեռնային պարեկներ	Artavazd Peleshyan	Soviet Union
Seasons of the Year (1975)	Տարվա եղանակները	Artavazd Peleshyan	Soviet Union
We (1969)	Մենք	Artavazd Peleshyan	Soviet Union
Peleshyan Project: Program 2
Beginning (1967)	Սկիզբը	Artavazd Peleshyan	Soviet Union
End (1992)	Վերջը	Artavazd Peleshyan	Armenia
Life (1993)	Kyanq	Artavazd Peleshyan	Armenia
Our Century (1982)	Մեր դարը	Artavazd Peleshyan	Soviet Union
