= La Influencia =

La Influencia or La influencia may refer to:

- La Influencia (2007 film), 2007 Mexican-Spanish drama film
- The Influence (2019 film), 2019 Spanish horror film also called in Spanish as La influencia
