= Heil Jupiter! =

- International teaser poster
- Directed by: Carlos Reygadas
- Written by: Carlos Reygadas
- Produced by: Cristina Velasco; Carlos Reygadas
- Starring: Neli de la Rosa; Alexis Sánchez Alonso; Flor de León; Alexis Said Villa de León; Morgan Krantz; Mónica Calle
- Cinematography: Daniel Valdes
- Edited by: Axel Bertha; Óscar Enríquez; Carlos Reygadas
- Production companies: No Dream Cinema; Paloma Negra Films; Madants; Rosa Filmes; Snowglobe; Fat City; Felix Culpa; Bord Cadre Films; Stær; LEAF Entertainment; Duende
- Release date: 27 September 2026 (NYFF)
- Running time: 158 minutes
- Countries: Mexico; Poland; Norway; Portugal; Sweden; Switzerland; United States
- Languages: Invented language; Spanish; English; Polish

Heil Jupiter! is a 2026 drama film written and directed by Carlos Reygadas. A co-production of Mexico, Poland, Norway, Portugal, Sweden, Switzerland, and the United States, it stars newcomers Neli de la Rosa, Alexis Sánchez Alonso, Flor de León, Alexis Said Villa de León, Morgan Krantz, and Mónica Calle.

The film premiered in the Currents section of the 2026 New York Film Festival on 27 September.

== Premise ==
It follows two young couples who enter a realm of shifting realities, unaware that a mysterious entity is observing them from above with God-like judgment.

== Cast ==
- Neli de la Rosa as Lina
- Alexis Sánchez Alonso as Milu
- Flor de León as Tzina
- Alexis Said Villa de León as Said
- Morgan Krantz
- Mónica Calle

== Production ==
The film is produced by Cristina Velasco for Paloma Negra Films and Carlos Reygadas for No Dream, in co-production with Madants (Poland), Rosa Films (Portugal), Snowglobe (Sweden), Fat City (U.S.), Felix Culpa (U.S.), Board Cadre (Switzerland), Staer (Norway), Marco Perego's Leaf Entertainment (U.S.), and Duende (U.S.).

First announced under the title Wake of Umbra, the film has been in production over the last years, with shooting take place across Poland, Portugal, Sweden, Norway, and Mexico.

It marks Reygadas first feature film in eight years, following Our Time (2018).

== Release ==
The film had its world premiere in the Currents section of the 2026 New York Film Festival on 27 September.

== See also ==
- 2026 in film
- Cinema of Mexico
