= Eyimofe =

2020 Nigerian drama film by Arie Esiri and Chuko Esiri

- Directed by: Arie Esiri; Chuko Esiri
- Written by: Chuko Esiri
- Produced by: Melissa Adeyemo; Arie Esiri; Chuko Esiri
- Starring: Jude Akuwudike; Temi Ami-Williams
- Cinematography: Arseni Khachaturan
- Edited by: Andrew Stephen Lee
- Music by: Akin Adebowale
- Production companies: GDN Studios, Kimiera, Ominira Studios
- Distributed by: Janus Films
- Release date: 11 October 2020 (BFI)
- Running time: 114 minutes
- Country: Nigeria
- Languages: English; Nigerian Pidgin; Yoruba

Eyimofe (Eyimofe: This Is My Desire) also known as This Is My Desire is a 2020 Nigerian drama film produced and directed by twin brothers Arie Esiri and Chuko Esiri on their directorial debuts. The film was written by Chuko Esiri. The film is made of two chapters called Spain and Italy. The film stars Jude Akuwudike and Temi Ami-Williams in the main lead roles. The film was opened to positive reviews from critics and was screened at various global international film festivals in 17 countries.

== Plot ==
Split into two different chapters, the film revolves around printing shop technician Mofe (Jude Akuwudike) and hairdresser Rosa (Temi Ami-Williams) on their quest for what they anticipate and believe will be a better life on foreign shores. Mofe wishes to go to Spain and Rosa hopes to go to Italy. However, Mofe loses his family, while Rosa fails in taking care of her younger pregnant sister and marries her landlord out of necessity.

== Cast ==
- Jude Akuwudike as Mofe
- Temi Ami-Williams as Rosa
- Cynthia Ebijie as Grace
- Tomiwa Edun as Seyi
- Jacob Alexander as Peter
- Chioma Omeruah as Mama Esther
- Ejike Asiegbu as Goddey
- Sadiq Daba as Jakpor
- Imoh Eboh as nurse
- Chiemela Azurunwa as doctor
- Kemi Lana Akindoju as Hope
- Kelechi Udegbe as Dauda
- Emeka Nwagbaraocha as Akin
- Chidumebi Nzeribe as Celestine
- Omoye Uzamere as Precious
- Charles Ukpong as Abu
- Fortune Nwafor as Wisdom
- Rita Edward as Peace
- Emmanuel Adeji as Blessing
- Toyin Oshinaike as Vincent
- Nonso Odogwu as Barrister Onuah

== Production ==
The film was announced by twin brothers Arie Esiri and Chuko Esiri as they jointly worked on the project. The film marked the directorial debut for them as they co-directed the film. The film was funded entirely in Nigeria and was shot in 16mm and was filmed across 48 locations in Lagos where the film was set. Few portions of the film were also shot in New York. The film was awarded the 2018 Purple List Award and was chosen as one of the ten projects in 2019 IFP Narrative Lab in New York.

== Release ==
The film has screened at various international film festivals held in South Africa, Netherlands, US, Italy, Poland, UK, Spain, Brazil, Portugal, UAE, Canada, Austria, China, Greece, Egypt, Germany and India.

The film was officially selected to be premiered in 17 countries in their respective film festivals as follows

- 70th Berlin International Film Festival, Germany (24 February 2020)
- Vancouver International Film Festival, Canada (26 September 2020)
- BFI London Film Festival, UK (11 October 2020)
- 2020 Film Africa
- 2020 Indie Lisboa International Film Festival, Portugal
- 2020 Internacional de Cinema São Paulo International Film Festival/Mostra São Paulo Film Festival, Brazil
- 2020 Cinecitta International Film Festival, Netherlands
- AFI Film Festival, USA (20 October 2020)
- 2020 Valladolid International Film Festival, Spain
- Sharjah Film Platform Festival, UAE
- 2020 Cairo International Film Festival, Egypt
- 2020 Thessaloniki International Film Festival, Greece
- 2020 Karlovy Vary International Film Festival
- 2020 New Horizons International Film Festival, Poland
- Torino Film Festival, Italy (24 November 2020)
- 2020 Hainan Island International Film Festival, China
- Viennale, Austria
- World Panorama section of the 51st International Film Festival of India (24 January 2021)
- 2021 BlackStar Film Festival

== Reception ==
The film received positive reviews from critics. Glenn Kenny of RogerEbert.com gave it 3.5 stars out of four, writing that it is "a confident, knowing, empathetic effort. While the themes here are, of course, redolent of neorealism, the filmmakers don’t make ostentatious nods to cinema past. Their voice is their own; the camera is mobile when it needs to be, but stands still much of the time, letting the excellent cast build their characters as the events of the film test their endurance. And endurance rather than desire is what the movie is finally all about."

Writing in The New Yorker, novelist Teju Cole called it an "artful and luminous film" and "a search for how best to live." Comparing it to Wong Kar Wai’s In The Mood for Love, Asghar Farhadi’s A Separation, and Mati Diop’s Atlantics, he concludes: "It is a testament to Chuko Esiri’s compact and intelligent script that the film moves by its own persuasive logic, feeling neither like a catalogue of miseries nor a sentimental exercise in third-world pluck."

It was listed as one of the best African films of 2022.

The film maintains a "Fresh" score of 100% on Rotten Tomatoes based on 23 reviews, with an average score of 7.9/10.

== Awards and nominations ==
The film received few awards and nominations at film festivals. It won the Achille Valdata Award at the 2020 Torino International Film Festival.

Year	Award	Category	Result
2020	Berlin International Film Festival	Best First Feature	Nominated
2020	Indie Lisboa International Film Festival	Grand Prize City of Lisbon	Nominated
2020	Torino Film Festival	Prize of the City of Torino	Nominated
2020	Valladolid International Film Festival	Best Feature Film	Nominated
2020	Berlinale	Best First Film	Nominated
2021	BlackStar Film Festival	Best Feature Narrative	Won
2021	Africa Movie Academy Awards	Best Film	Nominated
2021	Africa Movie Academy Awards	Best Director	Won
2021	Africa Movie Academy Awards	Best Actor in a Leading Role	Nominated
2021	Africa Movie Academy Awards	Achievement in Editing	Won
2021	Africa Movie Academy Awards	Best Nigerian Film	Won
2021	Africa Movie Academy Awards	Best Sound	Won
2021	Africa Movie Academy Awards	Best First Feature Film by a Director	Won
