= A Likeness in Stone =

- TV Tie-In Novel
- Genre: Crime drama
- Created by: J. Wallis Martin
- Written by: J. Wallis Martin
- Directed by: Charles Beeson
- Starring: Liam Cunningham; Jonathan Firth; Andrew Lincoln; Ruth Jones; Cherie Lunghi; Rebecca Palmer; Nicholas Hewetson; Jude Akuwudike
- Country of origin: United Kingdom
- Original language: English
- No. of series: 1
- No. of episodes: 2

Production
- Executive producer: Jenny Sheridan
- Producer: Lee Morris
- Editor: David Blackmore
- Running time: 75 minutes
- Production company: BBC Productions

Original release
- Network: BBC One
- Release: 11 September – 12 September 2000

A Likeness in Stone is a British television crime drama serial, broadcast across two nights between 11 and 12 September 2000 on BBC One. The serial stars Liam Cunningham as Detective Inspector Bill Armstrong, a retired cop who returns to service after the body of a student is discovered, 10 years after her disappearance. Determined to uncover the murderer, Armstrong seeks to go behind the call of duty to bring justice to the victim's family. The serial was based upon the novel of the same name by author J. Wallis Martin which was published in Hardback by Hodder and Stoughton (UK) 1997, and translated into several languages.

The serial co-starred Jonathan Firth, Andrew Lincoln, Ruth Jones and Cherie Lunghi. It was broadcast across two consecutive nights, on 11 and 12 September 2000. Reviews of the serial were favourable.

== Cast ==
- Liam Cunningham as Bill Armstrong
- Jonathan Firth as Stephen Gilmore
- Andrew Lincoln as Richard Kirschman
- Ruth Jones as Joan Poole
- Cherie Lunghi as Merle Kirschman
- Rebecca Palmer as Helena Warner
- Nicholas Hewetson as DI David Rigby
- Jude Akuwudike as DC Levi Pryor
- Sara Griffiths as Fiona Wharby
- Kate Fahy as Dorothy Warner
- Katy Cavanagh as Cathy Wilson
- Andrew Hilton as Thomas Gilmore

== Episodes ==
No.	Title	Directed by	Written by	British air date	UK viewers (million)
1	"Part One"	Charles Beeson	Michael Crompton	11 September 2000	N/A
The dark secret of three old college friends is brought to the surface after divers find the body of an Oxford student ten years after she went missing, secreted in a house at the bottom of a reservoir. Former Detective Inspector Bill Armstrong is determined to expose the conspiracy that protected her murderer.
2	"Part Two"	Charles Beeson	Michael Crompton	12 September 2000	N/A
With Gilmore on the run, Armstrong fears for the safety of Joan Poole and Richard Kirschman, Gilmore's alibis for the murder of Helena Warner. As the police are still reluctant to get involved, Armstrong decides to take the law into his own hands.
