= Yorùbá Boy Running =

2024 book by Biyi Bandele

Yoruba Boy Running
- Author: Biyi Bandele
- Cover artist: Chris Ofili
- Language: English
- Genre: Historical fiction
- Publisher: Hamish Hamilton
- Publication date: 18 April 2024
- Publication place: London, UK
- Pages: 288
- ISBN: 9780241562697

Yorùbá Boy Running is a historical fiction novel by Nigerian writer Biyi Bándélé (1967–2022), published posthumously in 2024. The book tells the story of Àjàyí Crowther, a young boy captured and sold into slavery in 1821, who later became a prominent figure in the Anglican Church.

== Plot Summary ==
In 1821, Àjàyí, a thirteen-year-old boy, living a normal life in Òsogùn, was captured by the Malian warriors (captors) who stormed into his village and took him and his family as slaves. He was later taken to the barracoons on Èkó Island (Lagos) to be shipped to Brazil but he was rescued by a British Royal Navy ship, was set free and taken to Sierra Leone, because Nigeria is still ravaged by the slave trade during the pre-colonial period. Àjàyí's intelligence and his proficiencies in languages is noticed by the missionaries, and this sets him on an astonishing career in the church, meeting Queen Victoria and other dignitaries. He became a reverend and was later ordained as Bishop in 1864 to oversee the Church Missionary Society (CMS) churches in the Niger.

== Publication history ==
Yorùbá Boy Running was Biyi Bándélé's final work, completed just days before his death in August 2022, and was published posthumously in 2024. The novel was first published in London by Hamish Hamilton, an imprint of Penguin Random House, in April 2024, with an introduction by Wole Soyinka and cover artwork by Chris Ofili. It was subsequently published by HarperCollins in the United States in September 2024.

== Reception ==
Yorùbá Boy Running received a starred review in Publishers Weekly and was praised by Kirkus Reviews. Estelle Shirbon in a review for The Times Literary Supplement stated that the book was written with "exquisite precision and originality". In a review for The Guardian, Helon Habila praised the book's vivid imagery and its "wit and dramatic timing", comparing it to works by Wole Soyinka. However, Habila also noted that the later sections of the book lacked some polish, given its posthumous publication. Alida Becker wrote in The New York Times that the book had the "aura of ancestral myth" and that the "malign influence" of the slave trade was at the heart of the novel. Adeleke Adegboyega noted that the novel "exposes the brutal realities of slavery and colonialism", also emphasizinng "the resilience and agency of African individuals and communities in resisting cultural erasure". Fiona Sturges praised the book as "remarkable" and "extraordinary" life story that is both dramatic and historically significant. Andrew Nwagbara and Eric Maiwong describe the novel as a "fastidious story" that demonstrates a "remarkable adherence to historical accuracy". They also note that the novel is compartmentalized into sections, with specific dates attached to each—the novel's narrative style made more fascinating by the breaking down into short chapters and the segmentation into various parts, with titles and dates representing "historical facts that serve as signposts of time".

The reviewer for Friends Journal, referencing Soyinka's praise for Bandele in the book's introduction, concluded: "Through Samuel Àjàyí Crowther, two great writers challenge us to learn and to confront assumptions and prejudice with humility, courage, honor, and grace."
