= Clarissa (2026 film) =

2026 film by Chuko Esiri and Arie Esiri

- Teaser poster
- Directed by: Arie Esiri; Chuko Esiri
- Written by: Chuko Esiri
- Based on: Mrs Dalloway by Virginia Woolf
- Produced by: Theresa Park; Nicky Weinstock; Arie Esiri; Chuko Esiri
- Starring: Sophie Okonedo; David Oyelowo; Toheeb Jimoh; India Amarteifio; Jude Akuwudike; Danny Sapani; Modesinuola Ogundiwin; Chuks Joseph; Fortune Nwafor; Nikki Amuka-Bird; Joke Silva; Ayo Edebiri
- Cinematography: Jonathan Bloom
- Edited by: Blair McClendon
- Music by: Kelsey Lu
- Production companies: Per Capita Productions; Invention Studios
- Distributed by: Neon
- Release dates: May 16, 2026 (Cannes); December 11, 2026 (United States)
- Running time: 125 minutes
- Countries: United States; Nigeria; Egypt
- Language: English

Clarissa is a 2026 drama film directed and produced by Arie Esiri and Chuko Esiri. A modern-day reimagining of the 1925 novel Mrs Dalloway by Virginia Woolf, it is set in contemporary Lagos, Nigeria and follows a high-society woman who finds herself looking back on her past when she is reunited with former friends and lovers. It stars Sophie Okonedo and India Amarteifio as the older and younger versions of the title character. The supporting cast includes David Oyelowo, Toheeb Jimoh, Jude Akuwudike, Danny Sapani, Modesinuola Ogundiwin, Chuks Joseph, Fortune Nwafor, Nikki Amuka-Bird, Joke Silva, and Ayo Edebiri.

The film had its world premiere at the Directors' Fortnight section of the 2026 Cannes Film Festival on May 16, where it was nominated for the Queer Palm. It is scheduled for a limited theatrical release in the United States on December 11 by Neon.

== Cast ==
David Oyelowo, Ayo Edebiri, Arie Esiri, Chuko Esiri, and India Amarteifio at the 2026 Toronto International Film Festival

- Sophie Okonedo as Clarissa
  - India Amarteifio as young Clarissa
- David Oyelowo as Peter, Clarissa's former lover
  - Toheeb Jimoh as young Peter
- Nikki Amuka-Bird as Sally, Clarissa's estranged friend
  - Ayo Edebiri as young Sally
- Fortune Nwafor as Septimus, a traumatized military officer
- Jude Akuwudike as Richard, Clarissa's husband
  - Ogranya as young Richard
- Danny Sapani as Ugo, Clarissa's friend
  - Kehinde Cardoso as young Ugo
- Modesinuola Ogundiwin as Aisha, Septimus' wife
- Yasmin Dankaro as Ellie, Clarissa's daughter
- Joke Silva as Lady Maryam, Ugo's boss
- Chuks Joseph as Evans
- Joy Sunday as Comfort

== Production ==
=== Development ===
In August 2021, twin filmmakers Arie and Chuko Esiri revealed that they were developing a modern-day reimagining of the 1925 novel Mrs Dalloway by Virginia Woolf, set in Abraka, Delta State, and Lagos, Nigeria. The script was written by Chuko, with both brothers serving as producers and directors. Theresa Park of Per Capita Productions secured funding from Neon and invited Nicky Weinstock of Invention Studios to round off the team.

=== Casting ===
Sophie Okonedo was cast as Clarissa before the script had even been written; according to the brothers, Okonedo was the only person they envisioned in the role. Ayo Edebiri later joined the project as young Sally; with both Edebiri and Okonedo attached, the filmmakers were able to secure the interest of casting director Nina Gold, helping pave the way for the remainder of the cast to come together.

=== Filming ===
Principal photography took place in Lagos and Delta State during November and December 2025, with Jonathan Bloom serving as director of photography lensing on 35mm. Blair McLendon was the editor. Kesley Lu was the composer. The film was reportedly made for just under $5 million, with half of the financing coming from CANEX Creations, a wholly owned subsidiary of the Fund for Export Development in Africa (FEDA), the equity investment arm of Afreximbank, and MBO Capital, a Nigerian private equity firm. In November 2025, Neon acquired worldwide distribution rights to the film.

== Release ==
The film had its U.S. premiere in the Main Slate of the 2026 New York Film Festival.

== Reception ==
=== Critical response ===
On the review aggregator website Rotten Tomatoes, 96% of 24 critics' reviews are positive, with an average rating of 7.90/10. On Metacritic, the film holds a weighted average score of 85 out of 100 based on 12 critics, indicating "universal acclaim".

Following its Cannes premiere, the film received overwhelmingly positive reviews from outlets that included The Guardian, The Hollywood Reporter, The Wrap, and Screen Daily.

=== Accolades ===
Award	Year	Category	Recipient(s)	Result	Ref.
Cannes Film Festival	May 23, 2026	Directors' Fortnight Audience Award	Chuko Esiri and Arie Esiri	Nominated	
Cannes Film Festival	May 23, 2026	Queer Palm	Chuko Esiri and Arie Esiri	Nominated	
Celebration of Cinema and Television	November 16, 2026	Breakthrough Director Award	Chuko Esiri and Arie Esiri	Honored	
Chicago International Film Festival	October 25, 2026	Gold Hugo	Clarissa	Nominated	
Gotham Independent Film Awards	November 30, 2026	Best Feature	Arie Esiri, Chuko Esiri, Arie Esiri, Chuko Esiri, Theresa Park, Nicholas Weinstock	Pending	
Gotham Independent Film Awards	November 30, 2026	Best Adapted Screenplay	Chuko Esiri	Pending	
Gotham Independent Film Awards	November 30, 2026	Outstanding Lead Performance	Sophie Okonedo	Pending	
Gotham Independent Film Awards	November 30, 2026	Breakthrough Performer	India Amarteifio	Pending	
Denver Film Festival	November 1, 2026	Krzysztof Kieslowski Award for Best Feature Film	Clarissa	Pending	
Stockholm International Film Festival	November 22, 2026	Bronze Horse	Clarissa	Pending	
Virginia Film Festival	October 25, 2026	Outstanding Achievement in Screenwriting	Chuko Esiri	Won	
Zurich Film Festival	October 10, 2026	Golden Eye Award for Best International Feature Film	Clarissa	Nominated	
