= Jude Akuwudike =

Nigerian-born actor educated in England

- Born: Jude Akuwudike; 1959 (age 66–67); Nigeria
- Education: Royal Academy of Dramatic Art
- Occupation: Actor
- Awards: 2008 Red Rock Film Festival – Grand Jury Prize

Jude Akuwudike (born 1965) is a Nigerian actor. He has mostly worked in the United Kingdom, on screen and stage.

He has appeared in productions of the Royal Shakespeare Company and the Royal National Theatre.

== Early life ==
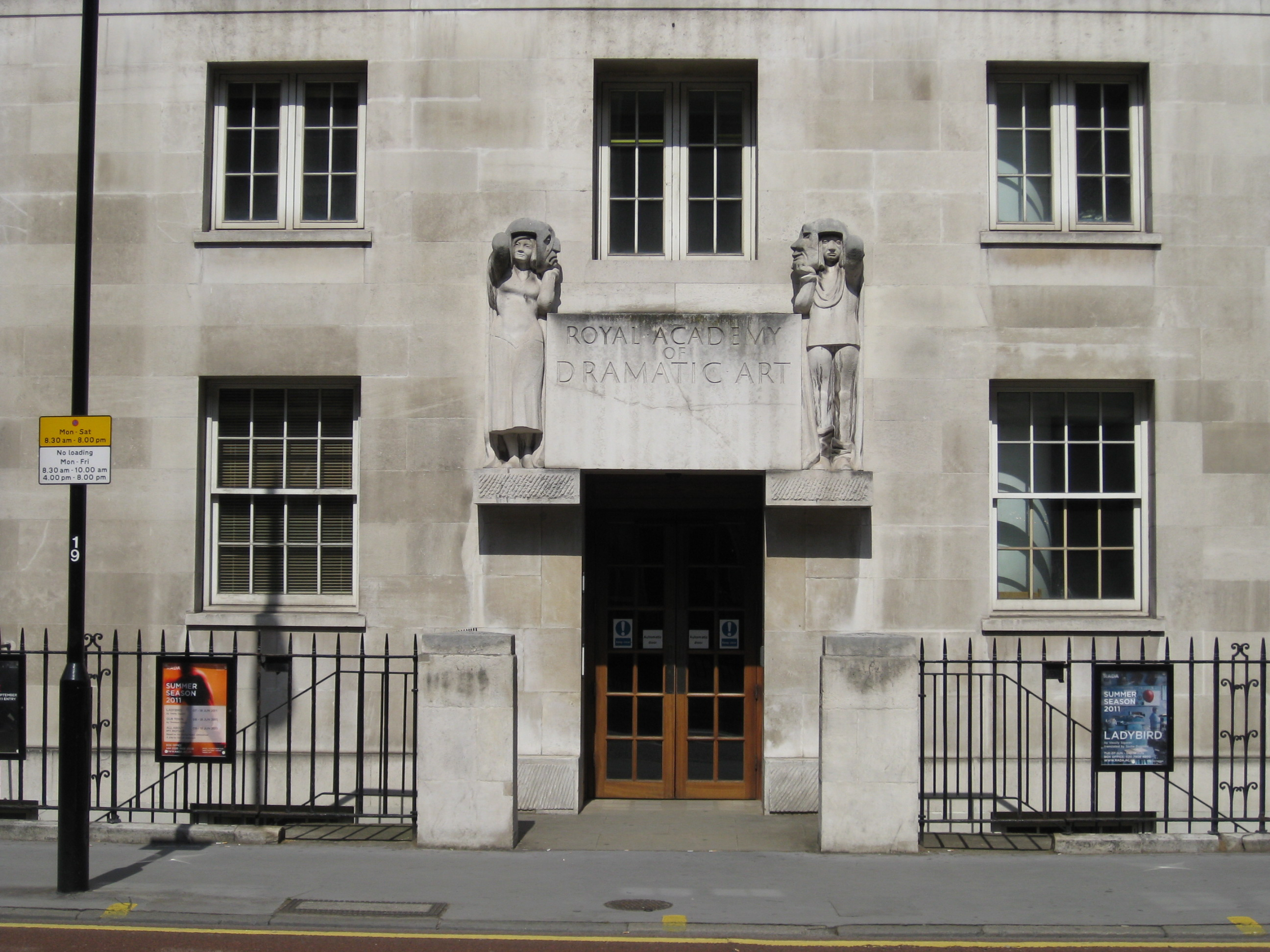
Akuwudike trained at the Royal Academy of Dramatic Art

Born in Nigeria, West Africa, Akuwudike moved to Britain and was educated at St Augustine's College in Westgate-on-Sea, Kent, an independent Roman Catholic boarding school. In 1985, he began to train for an acting career at the Royal Academy of Dramatic Art, graduating in 1987.

== Career ==
In 1988, Akuwudike played Captain Watkin Tench in Our Country's Good at the Royal Court Theatre. His first film appearance was in the same year, as a priest in A World Apart. An early leading role came in 1989 in the play The Fatherland by Murray Watts, at the Bush Theatre at Riverside, and his first significant part on television was as Sergeant Gummer in the drama serial Virtual Murder (1991).

Throughout his career, Akuwudike has worked mainly on stage, including appearing in several productions for the National Theatre, notably Not About Nightingales, Moon on a Rainbow Shawl, and Ion. He has also appeared for the Royal Shakespeare Company, as well as working on Broadway. He has also had many roles in film and television and is a voice actor.

In 1998, in the first British production of Not About Nightingales by Tennessee Williams, directed by Trevor Nunn at the National Theatre, Akuwudike originated the part of "the Queen", a gay prisoner. In 2002 he played the black pimp in a Royal National Theatre production of Edmond, with Kenneth Branagh in the title role.

From February to May 2011, Akuwudike was Abel Magwitch in an English Touring Theatre production of Great Expectations (adapted by Tanika Gupta), with Lynn Farleigh as Miss Havisham.

In the Cary Joji Fukunaga film Beasts of No Nation (2015), Akuwudike played Supreme Commander Dada Goodblood, leader of an unnamed West African country torn by civil war.

In September 2018, it was announced that Akuwudike had been cast alongside Joe Cole and Sope Dirisu in a new Cinemax television serial called Gangs of London, then in production.

The Actor's career has been centred on stage performances, which include notable roles in movie production for the National Theatre and the Royal Shakespeare Company.

== Filmography ==
=== Film ===
Key
| † | Denotes films that have not yet been released |

| Year | Film | Role | Notes |
|---|---|---|---|
| 1988 | A World Apart | Priest | Drama |
| 1997 | Richard II | Scroop | TV film |
| 1998 | The Ebb-Tide | Fakeeva | TV film |
| 2000 | A Likeness in Stone | DC Levi Pryor | TV film |
| 2005 | Sahara | Imam | Desert Adventure |
| 2007 | Jehovah's Witness | Percy | Short |
| 2010 | The Tempest | Boatswain | Drama |
| 2015 | Beasts of No Nation | Dada Goodblood | Drama / War |
| 2020 | Eyimofe | Mofe | |
| 2021 | Benediction | Priest | Docudrama |
| 2023 | The Little Mermaid | Joshua | Fairy Tale |
| 2024 | The Lord of the Rings: The War of the Rohirrim | Lord Thorne | Voice |
| 2026 | Clarissa | Clarissa’s husband | |

=== Television ===
| Year | Title | Role | Notes |
|---|---|---|---|
| 1990 | ScreenPlay | Thomas | Episode: "The Land of Dreams" |
| 1992 | Virtual Murder | Sergeant Gummer | Series regular 6 episodes |
| 1993 | Between the Lines | Custody Sergeant | Episode: "Big Boys' Rules: Part II" |
| 1994 | The Bill | Mr. Jensen | Episode: "All Along the Watchtower" |
| 1996–1999 | Roger Roger | Henry | Series regular 12 episodes |
| 1998 | Heat of the Sun | Elihu Mwangi | Episode: "The Sport of Kings" |
| 1999 | Kavanagh QC | Matthew Atta | Episode: "Previous Convictions" |
| 2003 | Silent Witness | Malcolm Linden | Episode: "Running on Empty" |
| 2003 | Holby City | Derek Fletcher | Episode: "Know When to Fold" |
| 2005 | Bad Girls | Leroy | 1 episode |
| 2005 | The Last Detective | Bradshaw | Episode: "Towpaths of Glory" |
| 2007 | Silent Witness | Willi | Episode: "Suffer the Children" |
| 2009 | Moses Jones | Matthias Mutukula | Mini-series; 3 episodes |
| 2009 | The No. 1 Ladies' Detective Agency | Oswald Ranta | Episode: "The Boy with an African Heart" |
| 2009 | Holby City | Marvin Stewart | Episode: "What Will Survive of Us" |
| 2010 | Law & Order: UK | Marcus Wright | Episode: "Skeletons" |
| 2012 | Holby City | Gabriel Vaughan | Episode: "Hail Caesar" |
| 2013 | Doctors | Thomas Tembe | 3 episodes |
| 2015 | Cucumber | Ralph Sullivan | 1 episode |
| 2016 | Stan Lee's Lucky Man | Dr. Marghai | Episode: "A Twist of Fate" |
| 2016 | Undercover | Al | 1 episode |
| 2016 | Friday Night Dinner | Custody Sergeant | Episode: "The Funeral" |
| 2017 | Chewing Gum | Alex | Episode: "Age Ain't Nothing But a Number" |
| 2017 | Death in Paradise | Tony Garret | Episode: "In the Footsteps of a Killer" |
| 2017 | The A Word | Vincent Daniels | 3 episodes |
| 2017–2018 | Fortitude | Doctor Adebimpe | Recurring role 10 episodes |
| 2018 | Kiri | Reverend Lipide | 1 episode |
| 2018–2020 | In the Long Run | Uncle Akie | Series regular 7 episodes |
| 2019 | Moving On | Dr. Bello | Episode: "Frozen" |
| 2019 | Plebs | Agrippa | Episode: "The Banquet" |
| 2020 | Gangs of London | Charlie Carter | Recurring role 9 episodes |
| 2020 | On the Edge | Dad | Episode: "BBW" |
| 2021 | Manhunt | Delroy Grant | Series regular 4 episodes |
| 2022 | The Crown | Sydney Johnson | Episode: "Mou Mou" |
| 2023 | Casualty | Clark Johnson | Episode: "No Regrets" |
| 2023 | Culprits | Carl Marking | Episode: "Circle in a Circle" |
| 2025 | Midsomer Murders | Richard Clissold | Episode: "Treasures of Darkness" |

=== Stage ===
| Year | Title | Role | Venue | Notes |
|---|---|---|---|---|
| 1988 | The Park | Norman | Crucible Theatre, Sheffield | |
| 1988 | Moon on a Rainbow Shawl | Ketch | Almeida Theatre, Islington, London | |
| 1988 | Our Country's Good | Captain Watkin Tench | Royal Court Theatre, London | |
| 1988 | The Recruiting Officer | Scruple/Costar Pearmain/Balance's Servant | Royal Court Theatre, London | also World Tour |
| 1989 | "Master Harold"...and the Boys | Sam | Bristol Old Vic, Bristol | |
| 1990 | Death and the King's Horseman | Olunde | Royal Exchange, Manchester | |
| 1991 | A Long Way From Home | Tomi | Tricycle Theatre, Kilburn, London | |
| 1991 | Light in the Village | Rhodes | Traverse Theatre, Edinburgh | |
| 1993 | Marching for Fausa | Sssi | Royal Court Theatre, London | |
| 1993 | Wiseguy Scapino | Léandre | Theatr Clwyd, Mold | |
| 1994 | Ion | Hermes-Athens | The Pit, Barbican Centre, London | |
| 1994 | Poor Super Man | Shannon | Traverse Theatre, Edinburgh | |
| 1995 | Richard II | Sir Stephen Scroop/Lord Fitwater | Cottesloe Theatre, Royal National Theatre, London | |
| 1995 | The Machine Wreckers | William | Cottesloe Theatre, Royal National Theatre, London | |
| 1996 | Nuremberg: The War Crimes Trial | | Tricycle Theatre, Kilburn, London | |
| 1998 | Not About Nightingales | The Queen | Cottesloe Theatre, Royal National Theatre, London | |
| 1999 | Honk! The Ugly Duckling | Turkey | Olivier Theatre, Royal National Theatre, London | |
| 2000 | A Doll's House | Nils Krogstad | Ambassadors Theatre, London | |
| 2001 | Luminosity | Saul Mercer | The Pit, Barbican Centre, London | |
| 2001 | Young Hamlet | King Claudius | Young Vic, The Cut, London | |
| 2001 | Brixton Stories | Ossie | The Pit, Barbican Centre, London | also UK Tour |
| 2002 | The Winter's Tale | Antigonus | The Roundhouse, Chalk Farm, London & Royal Shakespeare Theatre, Stratford-upon-Avon | |
| 2002 | Pericles | Cerimon | The Roundhouse, Chalk Farm, London & Royal Shakespeare Theatre, Stratford-upon-Avon | |
| 2003 | Henry V | Pistol | Olivier Theatre, Royal National Theatre, London | |
| 2003 | Edmond | A Pimp | Olivier Theatre, Royal National Theatre, London | |
| 2004 | The Jungle Book | Akela | Northampton Royal, Northampton | |
| 2005 | Pericles | Antichus/Lysinichus | Globe Theatre, London | |
| 2006 | The Overwhelming | Joseph | Cottesloe Theatre, Royal National Theatre, London | with Out of Joint Theatre Company |
| 2007 | Macbeth | Banquo | Swan Theatre, Stratford-upon-Avon | |
| 2007 | Macbett | Glamiss | Swan Theatre, Stratford-upon-Avon | |
| 2008 | God In Ruins | | Soho Theatre, Soho, London | |
| 2008 | The Resistible Rise of Arturo Ui | Dullfeet | Lyric Hammersmith, London | |
| 2008 | Walking Waterfall | Odame | Almeida Theatre, Islington, London | with Tiata Fahodzi |
| 2009 | Iya-Ile | Chief Adeyemi | Soho Theatre, Soho, London | with Tiata Fahodzi |
| 2009 | Othello | Othello | Citizens Theatre, Glasgow | |
| 2009 | The Rime of the Ancient Mariner | The Mariner | Southbank Centre, London | |
| 2011 | Great Expectations | Magwitch | Watford Palace Theatre, Watford | |
| 2011 | Passing Wind | Justice | New Wolsey Theatre, Ipswich | part of Pulse Fringe Festival |
| 2011 | The Faith Machine | Lawrence/Patrick | Royal Court Theatre, London | |
| 2011 | Britannicus | Burrhus | Wilton's Music Hall, Shadwell, London | |
| 2012 | Moon on a Rainbow Shawl | Charlie Adams | Cottesloe Theatre, Royal National Theatre, London | also UK Tour |
| 2012 | Ignorance | Dr Nasir al-Maliki | Hampstead Theatre, London | |
| 2013 | Othello | Othello | Cockpit Theatre, London | also USA Tour |
| 2015 | Hamlet Asylum Seeker | Claudius | UK Tour | with Talawa Theatre Company |
| 2015 | The Crucible | Reverend Parris | Bristol Old Vic, Bristol | |
| 2016 | Workshop Negative | Mkhize | Gate Theatre, London | |
| 2016 | The Royale | Wynton | Bush Theatre, Shepherd's Bush, London | |
| 2017 | The Lower Depths | Abram Ivanich Medvediev | Arcola Theatre, London | |
| 2017 | The Cherry Orchard | Yermolai Alexeievitch Lopakhin | Arcola Theatre, London | |
| 2018 | The Two Noble Kinsmen | Theseus | Globe Theatre, London | |
| 2018 | The Convert | Uncle | Young Vic, The Cut, London | |
| 2019 | Three Sisters | Eze | Lyttelton Theatre, Royal National Theatre, London | |
| 2022 | Henry V | King of France/Archbishop of Canterbury/Sir Thomas Erpingham | Donmar Warehouse, London | |
| 2022 | House of Ife | Solomon | Bush Theatre, London | |
| 2023 | The Dumb Waiter | Various | Greenwich Theatre, London | |
| 2023 | A Slight Ache | Various | Greenwich Theatre, London | |

=== Games ===
| Year | Title | Role | Notes |
|---|---|---|---|
| 2021 | GTFO | Dr. Abeo Dauda | |

== Awards and nominations ==
| Year | Award | Category | Work | Result | Ref. |
|---|---|---|---|---|---|
| 1994 | Martini Rossi TMA Awards | Best Supporting Actor | Poor Super Man | Won | |
| 2008 | Red Rock Film Festival - Grand Jury Prize | Special Achievement in Acting Role | Jehovah's Witness | Won | |
| 2016 | Screen Nation Film and Television Awards | Favourite International Film (with Idris Elba & Ama K. Abebrese) | Beasts of No Nation | Won | |
| 2021 | Africa Movie Academy Awards | Best Actor in a Leading Role | Eyimofe | Nominated | |
