= Biyi Bandele =

Nigerian writer and filmmaker (1967–2022)

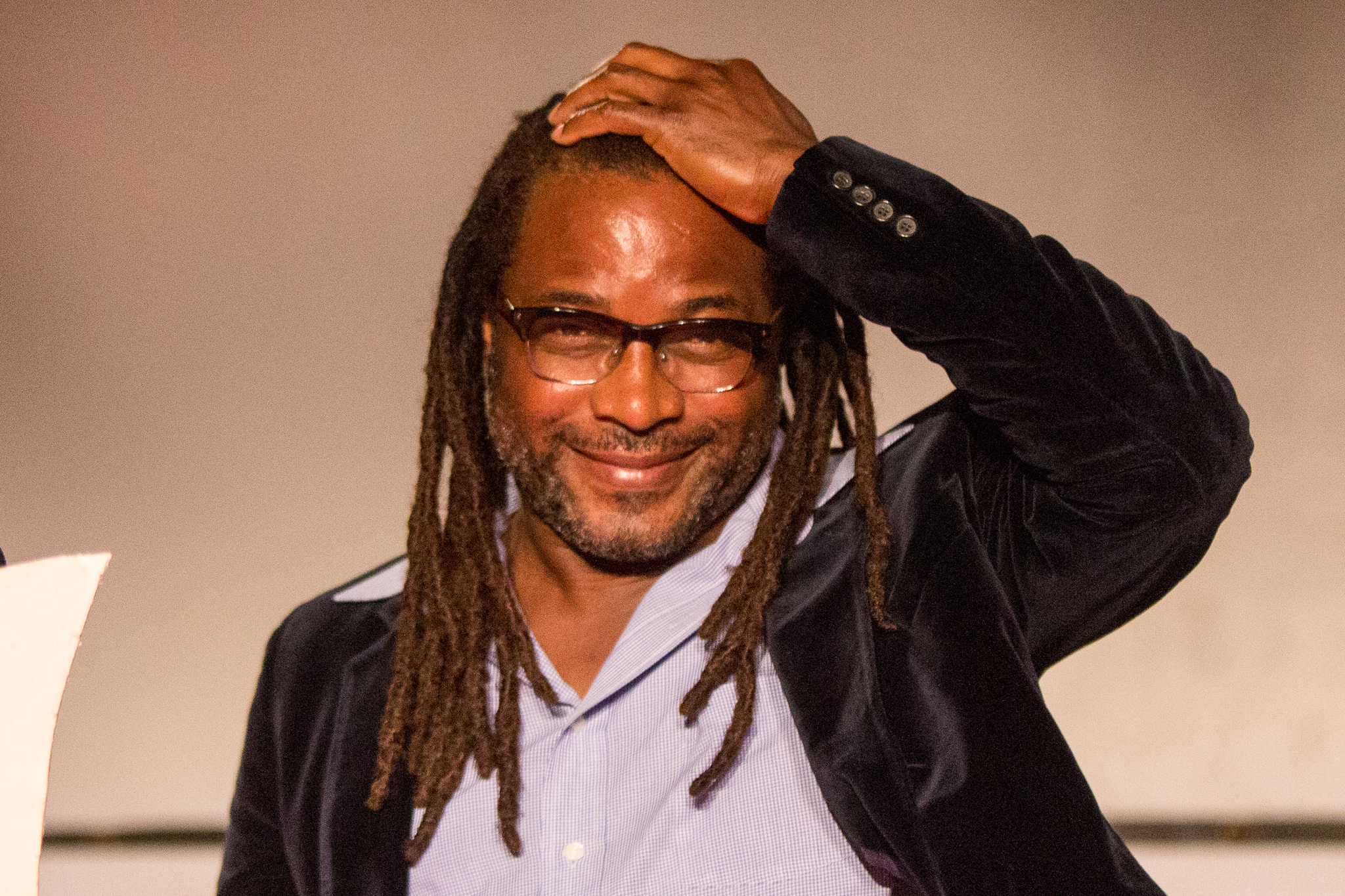
- Bandele at the Zanzibar International Film Festival, 2014
- Born: Biyi Bandele-Thomas; 13 October 1967; Kafanchan, Kaduna State, Nigeria
- Died: 7 August 2022 (aged 54); Lagos, Nigeria
- Education: Obafemi Awolowo University, Ile-Ife
- Occupations: Filmmaker; novelist; playwright
- Years active: 1998–2022
- Notable work: Half of a Yellow Sun
- Children: 2
- Awards: 1989 – International Student Playscript Competition – Rain 1994 – London New Play Festival – Two Horsemen 1995 – Wingate Scholarship Award 2000 – EMMA (BT Ethnic and Multicultural Media Award) for Best Play – Oroonoko

Biyi Bandele (born Biyi Bandele-Thomas; 13 October 1967 – 7 August 2022) was a Nigerian novelist, playwright and filmmaker. He was the author of several novels, beginning with The Man Who Came in From the Back of Beyond (1991), as well as writing stage plays, before turning his focus to filmmaking. His directorial debut was in 2013 with Half of a Yellow Sun, based on the 2006 novel of the same name by Chimamanda Ngozi Adichie.

== Early life ==
Bandele was born to Yoruba parents in Kafanchan, Kaduna State, northern Nigeria, in 1967. His father Solomon Bandele-Thomas was a veteran of the Burma campaign in World War II, while Nigeria was still part of the British Empire. In a 2013 interview with This Day newspaper, Bandele said of his ambitions to become a writer: "When I was a child, I remembered war was something that sprang up a lot in conversations on the part of my dad. ... That was probably one of the things that turned me into a writer." When he was 14 years old, Bandele won a short-story competition.

He spent the first 18 years of his life in the north-central part of the country, later moving to Lagos in the southwestern region of Nigeria, then in 1987 he studied drama at Obafemi Awolowo University, Ile-Ife, having already begun work on his first novel. He won the International Student Playscript competition of 1989 with an unpublished play, Rain, before claiming the 1990 British Council Lagos Award for a collection of poems.

Bandele moved to London, England, in 1990, at the age of 22, armed with the manuscripts of two novels. In 1991, his debut novel The Man Who Came in From the Back of Beyond was published, followed by The Sympathetic Undertaker: and Other Dreams, and he was given a commission by the Royal Court Theatre. In 1992, he was awarded an Arts Council of Great Britain writers bursary to continue his writing.

== Career ==
=== Writing ===
Bandele's writing encompassed fiction, theatre, journalism, television, film and radio.

He worked with London's Royal Court Theatre and the Royal Shakespeare Company (RSC), as well as writing radio drama and screenplays for television. His plays include: Rain; Marching for Fausa (1993); Resurrections in the Season of the Longest Drought (1994); Two Horsemen (1994), selected as Best New Play at the 1994 London New Plays Festival; Death Catches the Hunter and Me and the Boys (published together in one volume, 1995); and Oroonoko, an adaptation for the RSC of Aphra Behn's 17th-century novel of the same name. In 1997, Bandele did a successful dramatisation of Chinua Achebe's 1958 novel Things Fall Apart. Brixton Stories, Bandele's stage adaptation of his own novel The Street (1999), premiered in 2001 and was published in one volume with his play Happy Birthday Mister Deka, which premiered in 1999. He also adapted Lorca's play Yerma in 2001.

Bandele was writer-in-residence with Talawa Theatre Company from 1994 to 1995, resident dramatist with the Royal National Theatre Studio (1996), the Judith E. Wilson Fellow at Churchill College, University of Cambridge, in 2000–01. He also acted as Royal Literary Fund Resident Playwright at the Bush Theatre from 2002 to 2003.

Bandele wrote of the impact on him of John Osborne's play Look Back in Anger (1956), which he saw on a hire-purchase television set in a railway town in northern Nigeria:

And so although I had yet to set foot outside Kafanchan, although I knew nothing about postwar British society, or the Angry Young Men, or anything about Osborne when I met Jimmy Porter on the screen... there was no need for introductions: I had known Jimmy all my life.

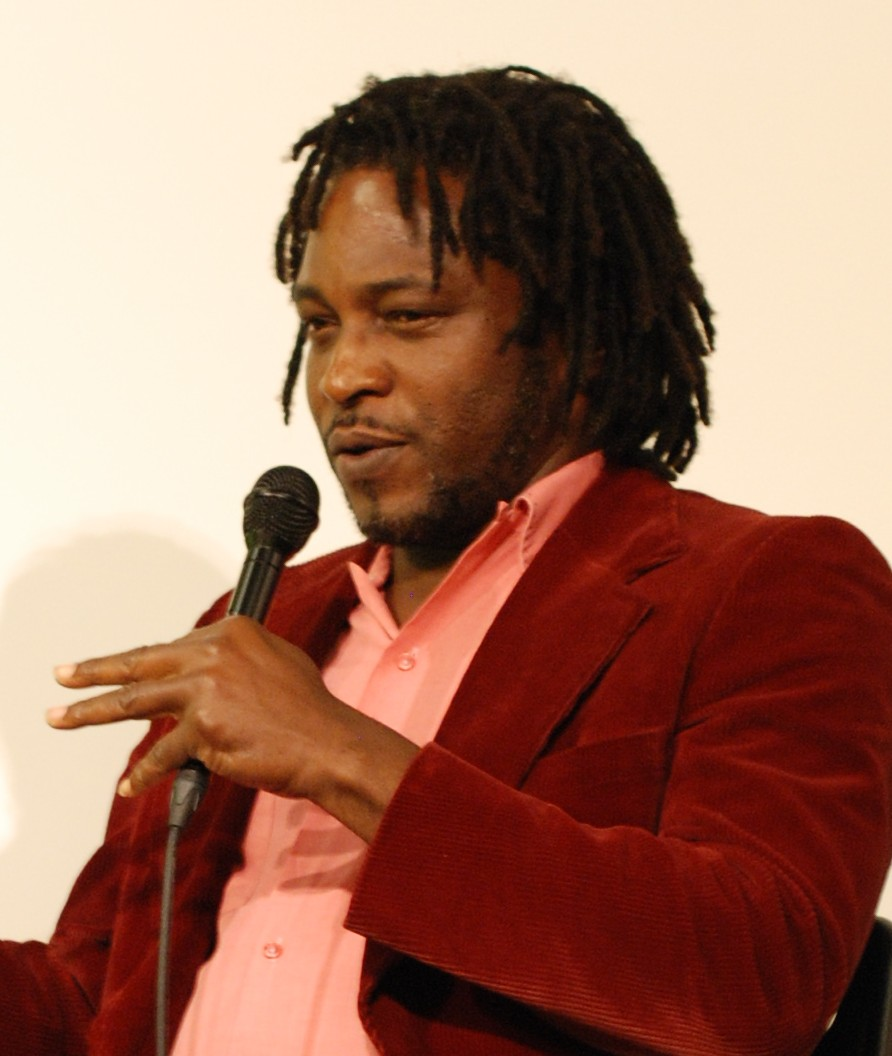
Bandele at the Göteborg Book Fair, 2010

Bandele's novels, which include The Man Who Came in from the Back of Beyond (1991) and The Street (1999), have been described as "rewarding reading, capable of wild surrealism and wit as well as political engagement". His 2007 novel, Burma Boy, reviewed in The Independent by Tony Gould, was called "a fine achievement" and lauded for providing a voice for previously unheard Africans.

At the time of his death, Bandele had been working on a new novel, entitled Yorùbá Boy Running, which had been due to be published in 2023, and was subsequently rescheduled for July 2024. The novel, which includes an Introduction by Wole Soyinka, was partly inspired by the life of Bándélé's great-grandfather, who had been formerly enslaved, like the novel's protagonist, Samuel Ajayi Crowther.

Helon Habila, reviewing Yorùbá Boy Running in The Guardian (London), writes: "The fictional Crowther's story, as well as the real-life one, is a remarkable saga of perseverance, dedication and triumph over adversity. ... What Bándélé brings to this well-known story is his ability slowly and painstakingly to build his protagonist’s character, not just as the public figure known to every schoolchild in Nigeria – the first black man to be ordained a bishop by the Anglican Church of England, the first African to earn a degree from the University of Oxford – but also as a father, a son, a husband and a citizen. ...The editors have done a great job of ordering and signposting the different sections with dates and thematic headings, making it easier to follow the sometimes intricate chronology of the narrative. We are lucky and grateful that the author was able to leave us with this bookend to his glorious if truncated career that began long ago in Kafanchan, Nigeria, when he started running towards a distinguished future in faraway London."

=== Filmmaking ===
Bandele's 2013 directorial debut film, Half of a Yellow Sun – based on the 2006 novel of the same name by Chimamanda Ngozi Adichie – was screened in the Special Presentation section at the 2013 Toronto International Film Festival (TIFF), and received a "rapturous reception". The film received a wide range of critical attention. Writing in The Guardian, Chibundu Onuzo described it as "a subtle movie of a large war, intimate and revealing of the personal tragedies that took place from July 1967 to January 1970....It is important that Bandele's film has been made."

He also directed the third season of the popular MTV drama series, Shuga, which aired in 2013.

His 2015 film, entitled Fifty, was included in the London Film Festival.

In 2022, he directed the first Netflix Nigerian Original series Blood Sisters, which made the top-ten list globally, accumulating more than 11 million viewing hours.

Bandele directed the Netflix and Ebonylife TV co-production Elesin Oba, The King's Horseman, the screen adaptation of Wole Soyinka's stage play Death and the King's Horseman, which premiered at Toronto International Film Festival in September 2022. Characterised by Variety as a "passion project" for the director, Elesin Oba, The King's Horseman was "the first-ever Yoruba-language film to premiere at TIFF in the Special Presentation category, and then onto Netflix".

== Themes and style ==
Bandele's writing explores themes of migration, memory, identity, war, political change, and everyday life in postcolonial Africa. Literary critics have noted his ability to combine humour, satire, and historical reflection while examining the social realities of Nigeria and the African diaspora.

His fiction frequently blends realism with elements of oral storytelling, creating narratives that draw on both African literary traditions and modern experimental techniques.

Critics have also highlighted his portrayal of ordinary individuals navigating political instability, social transformation, and cultural displacement.

== Other work ==
There were plans by galleries in London and New York to exhibit Bandele's photographs of street life in Lagos.

== Death and legacy ==
Bandele died in Lagos on 7 August 2022 at the age of 54. The cause of death has been confirmed to have been suicide, with no further details given. His funeral took place on 23 September.

Following his death on 7 August 2022, tributes were paid by writers, filmmakers, publishers, and cultural organisations who described him as a significant voice in African literature and cinema.

On 30 June 2024, at Brixton House theatre in London, A Night to Remember – Biyi Bándélé took place, hosted by Kwame Kwei-Armah, with friends, family, collaborators and colleagues (among them Adjoa Andoh, Burt Caesar, Chipo Chung, Danny Sapani, Diane Parish, Jude Akuwudike, Margaret Busby, Paterson Joseph and Shingai Shoniwa) gathering to celebrate Bandele's life and work, including the launch of his posthumously published final novel, Yorùbá Boy Running.

The Biyi Bándélé Award for Emerging Writers of the African Diaspora was launched in 2026 by his family in partnership with Brixton House and Curtis Brown, providing bursaries "to foster new talent, encourage bold storytelling, and amplify voices within theatre, film and literature". The bursary fund will aim to support at least three writers a year.

== Bibliography ==
- The Man Who Came in From the Back of Beyond, Bellew, 1991
- The Sympathetic Undertaker: and Other Dreams, Bellew, 1991
- Marching for Fausa, Amber Lane Press, 1993
- Resurrections in the Season of the Longest Drought, Amber Lane Press, 1994
- Two Horsemen, Amber Lane Press, 1994
- Death Catches the Hunter/Me and the Boys, Amber Lane Press, 1995
- Chinua Achebe's Things Fall Apart (adaptation), 1999
- Aphra Behn's Oroonoko (adaptation), Amber Lane Press, 1999
- The Street, Picador, 1999
- Brixton Stories/Happy Birthday, Mister Deka, Methuen, 2001
- Burma Boy, London: Jonathan Cape, 2007. Published as The King's Rifle in the US and Canada (Harper, 2009).
- Yorùbá Boy Running, London: Hamish Hamilton, July 2024, ISBN 9780241562697

== Filmography ==
- Half of a Yellow Sun – feature film, 2013
- Fifty – feature film, 2015
- Shuga – television series, Season 3 (Shuga Naija), 2013
- Blood Sisters – Netflix Nigerian Original series, 2022
- Elesin Oba, The King's Horseman – Ebonylife TV / Netflix co-production, feature film, 2022

== Awards ==
- 1989 – International Student Playscript Competition – Rain
- 1994 – London New Play Festival – Two Horsemen
- 1995 – Wingate Scholarship Award
- 2000 – EMMA (BT Ethnic and Multicultural Media Award) for Best Play – Oroonoko
