= Leap Frog Films =

Australian film distributor

- Company type: Private
- Industry: Film Distribution
- Founded: 2013
- Headquarters: Perth, Australia
- Area served: Australia, New Zealand
- Key people: David Doepel (Managing Director); Andrew Hazelton (Sales & Marketing); Barbara Connell (Development)
- Website: http://leapfrogfilms.com.au/

Leap Frog Films is an Australian film distributor. The company was founded by David Doepel and Barbara Connell.

== History ==
Leap Frog Films was founded in March 2013. The company changed its name to Demand Film Ltd in 2017. It currently operates in seven countries and has a network of 2,300 cinemas releasing films via a cinema on demand model .

The company was founded after Doepel acquired the Spanish animated film Wrinkles at Cannes Film Festival in 2012. Following this he acquired The Sea and the Nigerian-British film Half of a Yellow Sun at Toronto International Film Festival. Based on the 2006 novel by Chimamanda Ngozi Adichie, Half of a Yellow Sun released in Australia on 27 March 2014. Leap Frog Films also acquired Reaching for the Moon starring Miranda Otto, which it released in 2014. The company has gone on to release over 100 films primarily documentaries (including Frackman, Chasing Asylum, Plastic Ocean, Embrace for which it was nominated for a ScreenAward for its UK release for Specialist Film Campaign Phil Keoghan's Le Ride and MAMIL) as well as Rooster Teeth's Lazer Team 2 in Australia and New Zealand.

== David Doepel ==
David Doepel is a producer and documentary filmmaker. He served as a co-producer on the 1998 film Landfall.

Doepel has held a number of positions at Murdoch University including Deputy Vice Chancellor of Research and Development, Interim CEO of the National Centre of Excellence in Desalination, and Director, Research Institute for Resource Technology.

Prior to this, he served in the Western Australian Government as Principal Policy Advisor (Science and the Arts) to the then Premier Alan Carpenter and inaugural Regional Director for the Americas for the Western Australian Trade and Investment Office in Los Angeles.

== Filmography ==
Year	Title	Role
2014	Reaching for the Moon	Distributor
2014	Half of a Yellow Sun	Distributor
2013	Wrinkles	Distributor
2013	The Sea	Distributor
