= Half of a Yellow Sun (film) =

2013 film directed by Biyi Bandele

- Theatrical poster
- Directed by: Biyi Bandele
- Screenplay by: Biyi Bandele
- Based on: Half of a Yellow Sun by Chimamanda Ngozi Adichie
- Produced by: Andrea Calderwood; Gail Egan
- Starring: Thandiwe Newton; Chiwetel Ejiofor; Anika Noni Rose; Joseph Mawle; John Boyega; Onyeka Onwenu; Genevieve Nnaji; Hakeem Kae-Kazim
- Cinematography: John de Borman
- Edited by: Chris Gill
- Music by: Ben Onono; Paul Thomson
- Production companies: Shareman Media; Slate Films; British Film Institute (BFI); Lipsync Productions
- Distributed by: Metro International; Leap Frog Films; FilmOne Distributions; Soda Pictures; Monterey Media
- Release dates: 8 September 2013 (TIFF); 16 May 2014 (United States); 21 March 2014 (United Kingdom); 12 April 2014 (Lagos premiere); 1 August 2014 (Nigeria)
- Running time: 111 minutes
- Countries: Nigeria; United Kingdom
- Language: English
- Budget: ₦1.27 (US$8 – 10 million)
- Box office: ₦340 million (US$2.1 million)

Half of a Yellow Sun is a 2013 Nigerian drama film directed by Biyi Bandele, based on Chimamanda Ngozi Adichie's 2006 novel of the same name. Produced by Andrea Calderwood and Gail Egan, and distributed by Metro International, Leap Frog Films, FilmOne Distributions, Soda Pictures, and Monterey Media, it became one of the top grossing Nigerian films of the time. The film stars a cast of African and diasporan influencers, including Chiwetel Ejiofor as Odenigbo, John Boyega, Thandiwe Newton, Onyeka Onwenu, Genevieve Nnaji, OC Ukeje and Anika Noni Rose. In the film, twin sisters Olanna and Kainene catch up with love and unity in the outbreak of the Nigerian Civil War (1967–70).

Half of a Yellow Sun premiered in the Special Presentation section at the 2013 Toronto International Film Festival. The film had a mixed reception from critics.

== Plot ==
Half of a Yellow Sun begins during the first Nigerian Independence Day on 1 October 1960 and concluded at the end of the Nigerian Civil War in 1970. The film is interspersed with archival stock footage showing television news broadcasts of political events in Nigeria.

After completing their university education in the United Kingdom and United States, twin sisters Olanna and Kainene return to Nigeria. Their father is the Igbo Chief Ozobia, a wealthy businessman who owns assets in Port Harcourt. Spurning an offer to marry Finance Minister Festus Okotie-Eboh, Olanna decides to move in with her lover, the "revolutionary professor" Odenigbo, who teaches at the university in the Nigerian city of Nsukka. Meanwhile, Kainene takes over the family interests and pursues a career as a businesswoman, falling in love with Richard Churchill, an English writer.

At Nsukka University, Olanna finds work as a sociology lecturer and befriends Odenigbo's houseboy, Ugwu. However, Olanna faces hostility from Odenigbo's mother, "Mama", who distrusts the highly educated Olanna and considers her a witch. Disapproving of her son's relationship with Olanna, "Mama" plies Odenigbo with alcohol and arranges for her servant Amala to have a one-night stand with him. A devastated Olanna wants to break off the relationship, but her Aunt Ifeka convinces her to return to Nsukka.

Despite having a one-night stand with Richard, Olanna and Odenigbo reconcile and agree to raise Amala's infant daughter as their own child. The child is named Chiamaka, but they call her "Baby". After falling out with Kainene, Richard returns to London. While waiting at the airport, he witnesses Northern Nigerian soldiers slaughtering Igbo civilians in the build-up to the Nigerian Civil War. Meanwhile, Olanna is caught up in a race riot and barely escapes with her life. As ethnic tensions build up, Olanna and her family flee Kano and resettle in Abba in Biafra. After reconciling with "Mama", Olanna decides to remain in Nigeria and marry Odenigbo.

While Biafra declares independence, Richard returns from London to work with his lover Kainene, who has become a war profiteer, importing arms to Biafra. The fighting forces Olanna and her family to evacuate to Umuahia. During the wedding reception, Olanna and her family narrowly escape a Nigerian bombing raid. As the civil war drags on, Olanna and her family relocate to a refugee camp where she reunites with her sister Kainene, who has experienced a change of heart and helps to run the refugee camp. Ugwu is later conscripted as a Biafran child soldier.

Over time, Olanna and Odenigbo befriend Kainene and Richard. With the refugee camp running low on supplies due to the civil war, Kainene decides to travel into Nigerian territory in order to trade with local peasants, despite Odenigbo's warnings. Several days pass, and Kainene has not returned. While Olanna and Richard fail to find her, they are relieved to learn that Ugwu has survived the war and they welcome him back to the family. Following the defeat of Biafra, Richard continues his search for Kainene, while Olanna, Odenigbo, Ugwu, and "Baby" rebuild their lives.

== Cast ==
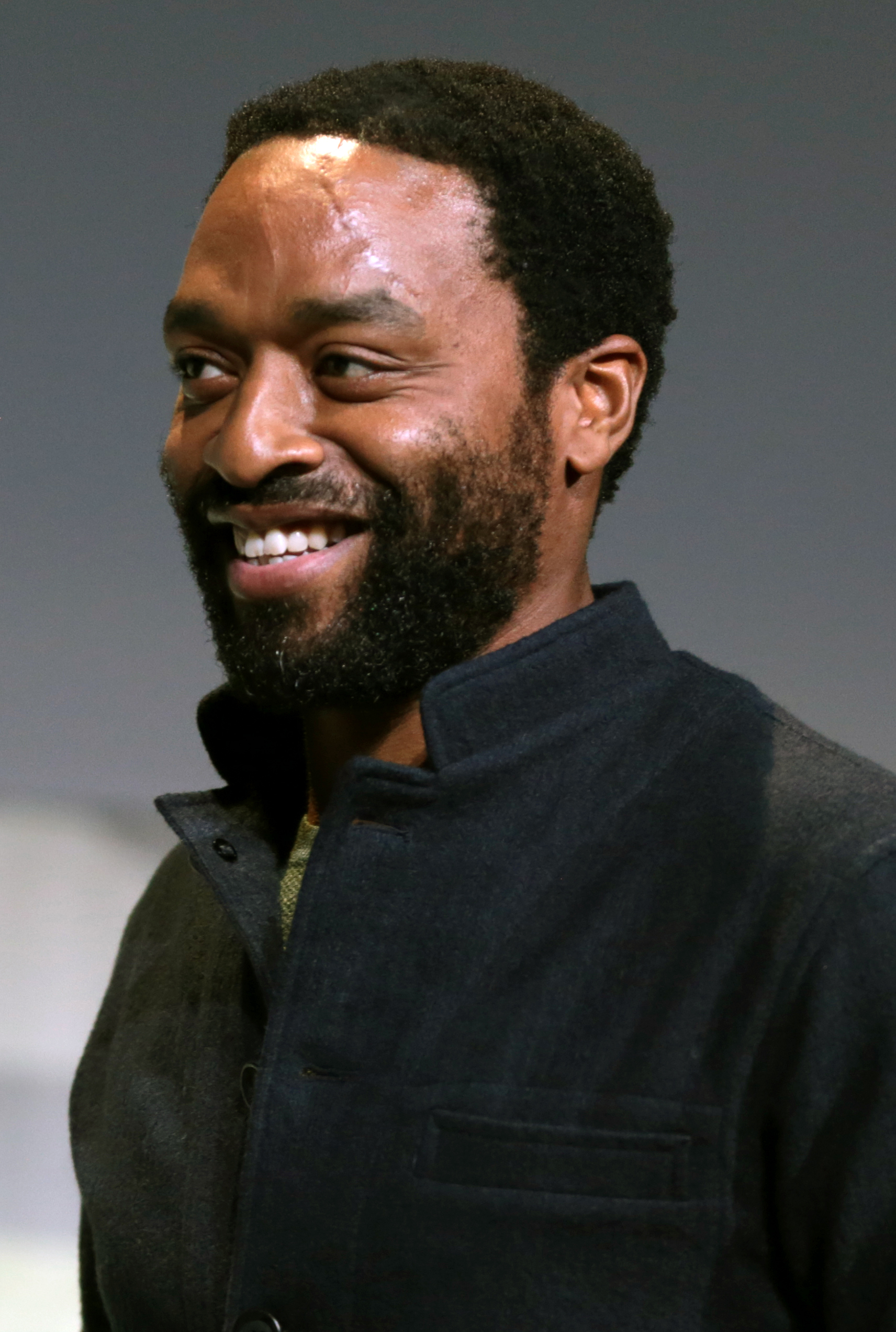
Chiwetel Ejiofor speaking at the 2016 San Diego Comic-Con International in San Diego, California

- Chiwetel Ejiofor as Odenigbo:
  A politically motivated academic. Odenigbo is in love with Olanna, whom he lives with in the University of Nigeria, Nsukka. His mother opposes his relationship and gets him drunk. He gets into a secret affair with Amala, a village girl, and she eventually births a baby girl. Olanna decides to break up with him but changes her mind following an advice from her aunt Ifeka. Both reconciles and trains the child Chimamaka who they fondly call "Baby". Odenigbo is the master of Ugwu, who becomes part of the Biafran Army. Odenigbo reunites with him as well as his wife and child. Playing the character was the first time Ejiofor worked in Nigeria. He cites playing the role because of his love for Adichie's book as well as seeing both his parents and grandparents experience similar things as was depicted in the novel. He describes the character as "a very flawed character who is in some ways the architect of his own demise", while citing it as "a revolutionary, a man who has incredible moral lapses in terms of his relationship, and is somebody who eventually comes to learn what all these things mean – the value of things, people, peace, the value of diplomacy and negotiation".
- Thandiwe Newton as Olanna
- Onyeka Onwenu as Odenigbo's mother
- Genevieve Nnaji as Ms Adebayo
- O.C. Ukeje as Aniekwena
- Anika Noni Rose as Kainene
- Joseph Mawle as Richard
- John Boyega as Ugwu
- Susan Wokoma as Amala
- Hakeem Kae-Kazim as Captain Duste
- Roberto Davide as Redhead Charles
- Babou Ceesay as Okeoma
- Gloria Young as Aunty Ifeka
- Wale Ojo as Chief Okonji
- Tina Mba as Mrs Ozobia
- Zack Orji as Chief Ozobia

== Production ==
Half of a Yellow Sun was shot across five weeks in Tinapa Studio, Calabar and Creek Town, Nigeria. Bandele lists malaria and typhoid as two of the major challenges of the shoot, with several members of the cast and crew becoming ill, including star Thandiwe Newton.

=== Release ===
The film was officially released in cinemas in Nigeria on 1 August 2014, having had a BFI London Film Festival premiere in October 2013.

=== Box office ===
"Half of a Yellow Sun" had a $10 million budget.

== Reception ==
=== Critical response ===
Half of a Yellow Sun received a mixed reception from critics. The film has a 50% aggregate rating on Rotten Tomatoes based on 53 reviews. The site's consensus states: "While it doesn't quite do justice to the source material, Half of a Yellow Sun adapts Chimamanda Ngozi Adichie's novel with committed performances and narrative nuance". Leslie Felperin of The Hollywood Reporter writes that it "is the kind of ambitious literary adaptation that wants it all kinds of ways, not all of them compatible" and that "the script is studded with great leaden lumps of expository dialogue". Nollywood Reinvented acknowledges that the film "is nowhere as good as the book", however, it points out that "Even though the movie does not recreate the emotions of the book, it creates its own emotions". The magazine praised the crew and cast, writing that "the movie builds on amazing sets, actors, supporting actors, and music", but the characters lack depth. Peter Bradshaw gave the film 2 out of 5 stars, also commenting that "there is a heartfelt quality" but that "unfortunately, the film is often stately and sluggish with some very daytime-soapy moments of emotional revelation. At other times, it looks more like a filmed theatrical piece". Robert Abele of the Los Angeles Times writes that the film "certainly makes for an honourably propulsive wartime soap", and "it's just not stirring enough as historical drama."

On 17 February 2014, Nigerian musician D'banj released a music video for his track entitled "Bother You". He told Digital Spy that he was inspired by the film. Roger's Movie Nation compared the film to Gone With the Wind (film) following a similar depiction of "intuitive female characters, expecting the worst from the politicians, instantly realizing when their man is cheating". Although it praises characters played by Rose and Ejiofor as "giving enough pathos to make the history lessons sink in" as well as writing that the film "immerses us in the refugee's plight in such wars – fleeing the front lines as the fighting closes in, witnessing the savagery of tribe-on-tribe (Igbo vs. Fulani) genocide, and getting by with the help of a loyal servant, simple servant", it criticises it as having "a bit of a muddle and a touch too soap operatic".

=== Accolades ===
Half of a Yellow Sun received six award nominations.

- Carthage Film Festival (2014)—Narrative Feature Film (nominated)
- Oslo Films From the South Festival (2014)—Best Feature (nominated)
- Black Reel Awards (2015)—Outstanding Foreign Film (nominated)
- Image Awards (NAACP)—Outstanding Independent Motion Picture (nominated)
- National Film Awards, UK – Best Actress, Thandiwe Newton (nominated)
- National Film Awards, UK – Best Breakthrough Performance in a Film, Chiwetel Ejiofor (nominated)

== Historical accuracy ==
This film uses as its background the Nigerian civil war, which took place between 1967 and 1970. The conflict comes from the differences in religion and political culture between the Igbo ethnic group and Muslim Hausa-Fulanis.

== Controversy ==
=== Casting ===
Thandie Newton being cast prior to the movie's release led to controversy, with a petition being made.

=== Censorship ===
Nigeria's film board delayed the release of Half of a Yellow Sun in the country. Journalist Aliyu Tanko of BBC Hausa argues that the Biafran War, one of the major topic depicted by the film remains extremely sensitive in the country. Although the director has cited knowing no knowledge of the delayed certification, Tanko says "some fear the film, which is seen as sympathetic to the Biafran separatist cause, could stoke up ethnic tensions".

== See also ==
- List of Nigerian films of 2013

== Sources ==
- Yong, Marinus Samoh; Kris-Ogbodo, Ngozi (2023). "Text to Screen: Sociocultural Challenges In the Adaptation of Chimamanda Adichie's Half of a Yellow Sun". Nsukka Journal of the Humanities. 31 (2): 16–27. doi:10.62250/nsuk.2023.31.2.16-27. ISSN 0794-8107.
- Adebisi, Ademakinwa (28 November 2023). "MEMORY, BIAFRA AND THE QUESTION OF NATIONHOOD IN BIYI BANDELE'S HALF OF A YELLOW SUN". University of Indonesia's Scholars Hub. 5 (2).
- "From page to screen: between betrayal and re-creation in the film adaptation of Chimamanda Ngozi Adichie's «Half of a Yellow Sun»". La clé des langues (in French). 15 September 2025.
- Amah, Munachim (3 July 2020). "Portrayal of Igbo Culture in the Film Adaptations of Things Fall Apart and Half of a Yellow Sun". Critical Arts. 34 (4): 76–89. doi:10.1080/02560046.2020.1726980. ISSN 0256-0046.
- Akudinobi, Jude G. (2015). "Biyi Bandele, director. Half of a Yellow Sun. 2013. 111minutes. English, with French, Igbo, and Hausa. Nigeria/U.K. Monterey Media. $26.99". African Studies Review. 58 (2): 279–281. doi:10.1017/asr.2015.62. ISSN 0002-0206.
