= La influencia (2007 film) =

2007 Spanish drama film by Pedro Aguilera

- Film poster
- Directed by: Pedro Aguilera
- Written by: Pedro Aguilera
- Produced by: Pedro Aguilera; José María Lara; Jaime Romandia
- Starring: Casilda Aguilera; Claudia Bertorelli; Jimena Jiménez; Romeo Manzanedo
- Production company: Mantarraya Productions
- Distributed by: Bac Films
- Release date: 20 July 2007
- Running time: 84 minutes
- Countries: Spain; Mexico
- Language: Spanish

La influencia (lit. 'The Influence') is a 2007 drama film directed by Pedro Aguilera in his directorial debut. The film stars Casilda Aguilera, Claudia Bertorelli, Jimena Jiménez and Romeo Manzanedo in the lead roles. It was also premiered at the Fortnight sidebar of the Cannes Film Festival. It was initially supposed to be released on 24 May 2007 but was postponed for its theatrical release on 20 July 2007 and received mixed reviews.

== Synopsis ==
A disoriented and vulnerable woman overburdened with daily life problems and more her belongings are impounded, her cosmetics shop has been closed down and her children's future is unknown.

== Cast ==
- Casilda Aguilera
- Claudia Bertorelli
- Jimena Jiménez
- Romeo Manzanedo
- Álvaro Moltó
- Paloma Morales
- Gustavo Prins
