= Post Tenebras Lux (film) =

- Directed by: Carlos Reygadas
- Written by: Carlos Reygadas
- Produced by: Jaime Romandia; Carlos Reygadas
- Starring: Adolfo Jiménez Castro; Nathalia Acevedo
- Cinematography: Alexis Zabé
- Edited by: Natalia López
- Production companies: NoDreamsCinema; Mantarraya Producciones; Le Pacte; Topkapi Films
- Distributed by: NDMantarraya
- Release date: 24 May 2012 (Cannes)
- Running time: 115 minutes
- Countries: Mexico; France; Netherlands
- Languages: Spanish; French; English

Post Tenebras Lux (Latin for "Light after darkness") is a 2012 drama film written and directed by Carlos Reygadas. The film is semiautobiographical, and the narrative follows a rural couple in Mexico, with additional scenes from England, Spain, and Belgium; all places where Reygadas has lived.

It competed at the 2012 Cannes Film Festival and Reygadas won the Best Director Award. Contemporary reviews were far more divided than those for Reygadas' previous works. Some considered the film incoherent or frustrating in structure.

== Plot ==
The film deals with a fragmented narrative, the life of Juan, a wealthy householder who, with his wife Natalia and their two young children Eleazar and Rut, decide to change the life of the city for the plain and simple country life. Starting again with an ostentatious house (in comparison to the homes of the few neighbors), they initially enjoy the taste of rural life. However this change in taste begins to make the marriage crumble. The children, on the other hand, are not encumbered by previous ideas and enjoy the life offered by this bleak place. The character of Juan begins to have contact with people who have the same ideals. Seven, a man who usually does everything in his power to survive, leads him to Alcoholics Anonymous meetings in a ramshackle cabin in the woods.

== Cast ==
- Adolfo Jiménez Castro as Juan
- Nathalia Acevedo as Nathalia
- Willebaldo Torres as "Seven"
- Rut Reygadas as Rut
- Eleazar Reygadas as Eleazar

== Production ==
Carlos Reygadas began to develop the idea for the film when he was building his house in the state of Morelos, Mexico. Reygadas would take frequent walks around the mountains and wanted to turn those experiences into a film. He envisioned it as a work where "reason will intervene as little as possible, like an expressionist painting where you try to express what you're feeling through the painting rather than depict what something looks like". Many story elements are directly autobiographical, although the director has stressed that the film is partially about desire and fantasies, so everything has not taken place in reality. The rugby sequence was inspired by the director's time as a student in England, where he enjoyed the sport. The rugby scene was filmed at the director's Alma Mater, Mount St Mary's College. The film was produced by Jaime Romandía and Carlos Reygadas through their companies Mantarraya Producciones and NoDreamsCinema. It was co-produced by France's Le Pacte and Dutch Topkapi Films. It was also backed by Arte France Cinéma.

The film was made in the 4:3 (1.37:1) aspect ratio because of the landscape with steep mountains, and to achieve compositions with a clearly framed centre. Exterior scenes were shot with a distortion effect around the edges; this was inspired by the impressionists and their fascination with outdoors motifs, as well as by the view from an old, not entirely smooth glass window. The village in the film is where Reygadas lives in Morelos. Filming wrapped late in 2011.

== Release ==
The film premiered in competition at the 2012 Cannes Film Festival on 24 May. The New York Times reported "belligerent boos and hooting" at the screening. All three of Reygadas' previous feature films had premiered at the Cannes Film Festival. It went on to screen within such festivals as Toronto International Film Festival and Maryland Film Festival, and was acquired for U.S. distribution by Strand Releasing.

=== Critical response ===
As of July 2014, the film had a rating of 55% on the website Rotten Tomatoes out of 51 reviews. On Metacritic, the film has a 69/100 rating, based on 20 reviews, signifying "generally favorable reviews".

The film was released to mixed critical reviews. Robert Abele of the Los Angeles Times described it as "real rarity in cinema, a visually striking archaeology of the psyche that benefits both the moviegoer primed to engage Reygadas' ideas, and the ones open to being swallowed in an art film wave". In a largely positive review, Manohla Dargis of The New York Times wrote, "Everything in the film may be in the past or may just be in the eternal, magnificent, maddening present that is Mr. Reygadas’s consciousness." Neil Young of The Hollywood Reporter labeled the film as "offensively self-indulgent cubist folly". Young expressed admiration for Reygadas' previous film Silent Light, but wrote: "Suspicions that the critically-lauded, award-laden Mexican is, in artistic terms, an emperor clad in exquisitely invisible garments will only crystallize further thanks to Post Tenebras Lux—which at its worst exudes the sort of smug pretentiousness that gives art-cinema a bad name in many quarters." In Screen International, Jonathan Romney wrote: "Alexis Zabé's vividly beautiful photography variously makes the images seem spontaneously caught, or deliberately framed and fixed in a video art manner—and it could be argued that this film has much more in common with gallery video than with most contemporary theatrical art cinema... However, you never feel that Reygadas is out to impose his unorthodox outlook, to impress himself on you as a visionary. There is a vision here, certainly, but the film feels genuinely, bracingly experimental in that it seems to be searching for its own meaning and form, rather than asserting them ready-made."

=== Accolades ===
- Cannes Film Festival, Best Director
- Cinemanila International Film Festival, Best Director
- Lima Latin American Film Festival, Critics Award (Best Director)
- Lima Latin American Film Festival, APRECI Prize (Best Film)
- Mar del Plata International Film Festival, Special Mention for Carlos Reygadas

== See also ==
- 2012 in film
- Cinema of Mexico
