= Battle in Heaven =

- Spanish: Batalla en el cielo
- Directed by: Carlos Reygadas
- Written by: Carlos Reygadas
- Produced by: Philippe Bober; Susanne Marian; Carlos Reygadas; Jaime Romandia; Joseph Rouschop
- Starring: Marcos Hernández; Anapola Mushkadiz; Berta Ruiz
- Cinematography: Diego Martínez Vignatti
- Edited by: Adoración G. Elipe; Benjamin Mirguet; Carlos Reygadas; Nicolas Schmerkin
- Music by: John Tavener
- Production companies: Nodream Cinema; Mantarraya Producciones
- Release date: May 2005 (Cannes)
- Running time: 98 minutes
- Country: Mexico
- Language: Spanish

Battle in Heaven (Spanish: Batalla en el cielo) is a 2005 Mexican-French-German film. It is the second feature film by director Carlos Reygadas who previously directed the Mexican film Japón. It was entered into the 2005 Cannes Film Festival. Reygadas has said about this film: "it's my problem child, and therefore the film of mine I love the most."

== Plot ==
Marcos (Marcos Hernández) is a working class man in Mexico City, employed by "the general." Marcos learns that the baby that he and his wife kidnapped for ransom had accidentally died. The remainder of the film follows a despondent Marcos, seemingly haunted by the moral and/or legal implications of his actions.

Marcos stands next to his wife Berta (Berta Ruiz) at the subway as she sells clocks and sweets at a stand. He travels to the airport to meet the "general's" upper-middle class daughter, Ana (Anapola Mushkadiz) whom he has known since she was a child. Ana orders Marcos to take her to the "boutique" where she works in the sex trade. While driving, Marcos is very distracted, and at one point stalls the car. Ana recognizes that something is wrong, but Marcos claims he's distracted only because of his wife's supposed ill health.

Ana invites Marcos into the "boutique" so that he can have sex with one of her "friends." Marcos is apparently not aroused by the "friend." The friend tells Ana that Marcos would prefer her instead. Ana goes to talk to Marcos, and reminds him that they have known each other since her childhood. Marcos then reveals that he and his wife kidnapped a baby but the baby died before they could collect any ransom. Ana seems to remain composed at hearing this news.

Back home, Marcos has sex with his wife, Berta. They seem united in their sorrow regarding the dead baby. Marcos tells Berta that he told Ana about the kidnapped baby, indicating that the confession brought him relief. Berta, upset, demands that he make sure that "the princess" does not tell anyone. The next day, Marcos visits Ana. She seems annoyed by his visit, but drives him to her place where they have sex. Ana advises Marcos to turn himself in to the police.

Marcos, Berta, their son, and a few friends (including the mother of the dead baby, who does not know who took her child, nor that it has died) go out to the countryside. Marcos tells Berta that he is going to turn himself in. She asks him to wait until after the pilgrimage (which is in honor of the Lady of Guadalupe), an event that Marcos had earlier shown disdain for. Marcos seems to agree with his wife. Marcos' mental state seems to worsen. Instead of driving back with his party, he treks through the countryside. He reaches a peak with Christian crosses, overlooking a valley. Marcos buries his face in his hands.

Marcos visits Ana at her home. He tells her that he will turn himself into the police that day. She gives him a goodbye kiss. Marcos leaves the apartment. He urinates his pants, goes back to the apartment and fatally stabs Ana.

The police become aware of both the attack on Ana and the death of the baby, and are in search for Marcos. Marcos seems to have joined the pilgrimage to the Basilica, at first on foot, and then on his knees. Someone places a hood over his face, but Marcos continues to hobble forward. The hood becomes increasingly stained with blood as he makes his way into the Basilica during the church service.

Eventually the pilgrims are gone, and the Basilica is vacant. The police allow Berta to go in to see her husband. She touches him on the head and he collapses. The film ends with a scene of Ana giving fellatio to Marcos as he says "I love you, Ana". She replies "I love you too, Marcos".

== Cast ==
- Marcos Hernández - Marcos
- Anapola Mushkadiz - Ana
- Bertha Ruiz - Berta
- David Bornstein - Jaime
- Rosalinda Ramirez - Viky
- El Abuelo - Chief of Police
- Brenda Angulo - Madame
- El Mago - Preacher
- Francisco 'El Gato' Martínez - Gas Station Attendant
- Diego Martínez Vignatti - Soccer Player
- Alejandro Mayar - Police Inspector
- Chavo Nava - Neurotic Conductor
- Estela Tamariz - Ines

== Production ==
Like Robert Bresson, Reygadas prefers to use non-professional actors, while occasionally recycling one (Hernández had a small part as a chauffeur in Japón). Unlike Bresson, Reygadas puts explicit sex scenes in his films. The sex scene between Hernández and Ruiz was simulated at Ruiz's husband's request, according to Reygadas on an interview included on the DVD.

Casually, in a scene when Marcos is masturbating in front of the TV screen, he's watching a football league match between Pachuca CF and Atlante F.C., valid for the Primera División de México Apertura 2003, which ended with a draw & no goals scored.

Anapola Mushkadiz said that a prosthetic penis was used in the fellatio scenes with Marcos Hernández.

== Critical reception ==
Jonathan Romney says that "To a degree, Battle in Heaven might seem like another warmed-over example of a familiar movie myth: a fairly repellent no-hoper redeemed by hot sex with a quasi-virginal prostitute," but that "it's finally hard to know whether Reygadas takes his transcendental, religious theme seriously, or is deriding it outright - or even deriding us for taking it seriously."

Lisa Schwarzbaum gives the film a grade of D+. "Between those two attention grabbers on a theme of flagpoles, languorously performed and indifferently observed, Mexican filmmaker/provocateur Carlos Reygadas pitches his own fight for the aesthetic tolerances of viewers, goading us to react to images about which he himself studiously offers no opinion." Schwarzbaum finds that "for all the shock of the movie's clinical carnality, this battle is lost."

Battle in Heaven was later voted one of the 30 best films of its decade in a poll for Sight & Sound. It was also ranked by Michael Atkinson of The Village Voice as the fifth greatest film since 2000 in BBC's 2016 poll.

== Awards ==
- Rio de Janeiro International Film Festival, FIPRESCI Prize
