= Japón =

2002 film by Carlos Reygadas

- Directed by: Carlos Reygadas
- Written by: Carlos Reygadas
- Produced by: Carlos Reygadas; Jaime Romandía
- Starring: Alejandro Ferretis; Magdalena Flores; Yolanda Villa
- Production companies: NoDream Cinema; Mantarraya Producciones
- Distributed by: The Criterion Collection DVD/Blu-ray (USA)
- Release date: 2 October 2002 (Belgium)
- Running time: 130 minutes
- Country: Mexico
- Language: Spanish

Japón (English: Japan) is a 2002 film by the Mexican director Carlos Reygadas. It was Reygadas' debut feature, which was shot on anamorphic 16-millimeter film in a 2.66:1 screen aspect ratio.

== Plot summary ==
The film follows a man going through an acute existential crisis. He leaves Mexico City to go out to the country and prepare for his death, staying with an old indigenous widow in her ramshackle home overlooking a desolate canyon. In the vastness of a wild and impressive nature, he confronts the infinite humanity of the widow and oscillates between cruelty and lyricism. His senses become dull, arousing his desires and instincts for sexuality and life.

== Production ==
It wasn't easy for Carlos Reygadas to find the old lady for Ascen's character. After casting three hundred candidates, the first one chosen fled quickly when she found out about the sex scene and forced the shooting to be suspended for a few days. Until Magdalena Flores showed up, who only relinquished her reservations when she made Reygadas promise not to show the scene when he screened the film for the locals.

Magdalena Flores never had access to the script or the dialogue. For each take Carlos Reygadas told her what to do and say, when and how. For the sex scene, for example, he anticipated how she would react in real life. "She had promised me she would do the scene, so I knew she would do whatever Ferretis told her to do. I also knew that her modesty was inevitable and that she would resist, which is exactly what I wanted to have in the film. I also told Ferretis to gently put Magdalena on her hands and knees and penetrate her. The scene played out exactly the way I had imagined it," Reygadas said.

== Reception ==
Japón received high accolades from most critics who have seen it, but the film has had relatively limited exposure. It was placed at #100 on The Moving Arts Film Journal's list of the 100 greatest films of all time. The film also won the special mention of the Camera d'Or prize in the 2002 Cannes Film Festival. Review aggregator Rotten Tomatoes reports 79% approval based on 28 reviews from critics.

== Controversy ==
Japón contains a number of scenes of real animal cruelty and the British Board of Film Classification demanded cuts for its UK release in accordance with the Cinematograph Films (Animals) Act 1937. The removed scenes are described as an unsuccessful attempt to strangle a bird that then stumbles around injured on the ground and a dog being forced to sing along with a song through the application of a painful stimulus. The film also includes an unsimulated scene of a bird being shot down and then killed by having its head torn off and the (off-camera) slaughter of a pig. Reygadas defended these scenes, as well as the explicit sexual encounters in Batalla en el Cielo, saying, "If you think about it, what’s so outrageous about a naked obese woman? There are plenty of astonishing images in other films with flying cars and such… What you see in my films, you can see it any ordinary day: a gas station, a hunter killing an animal, people making love. I’m not trying to impress anyone with those images; they make sense in the context of my films."

== Awards ==
- 2002 International Film Festival Bratislava, Grand Prix for Carlos Reygadas
- 2002 International Film Festival Bratislava, Prize of the Ecumenical Jury for Carlos Reygadas
- 2002 Cannes Film Festival, Golden Camera - Special Mention for Carlos Reygadas
- 2002 Edinburgh International Film Festival, New Director's Award for Carlos Reygadas
- 2002 Rio de Janeiro International Film Festival, Best Latin American Film for Carlos Reygadas
- 2002 São Paulo International Film Festival, Critics Award - Honorable Mention for Carlos Reygadas
- 2002 Thessaloniki International Film Festival, Best Director for Carlos Reygadas
- 2002 Stockholm International Film Festival, Audience Award for Carlos Reygadas
- 2002 Havana Film Festival, Best First Work for Carlos Reygadas
- 2003 Tromsø International Film Festival, Aurora Award - Special Mention for Carlos Reygadas
- 2003 Buenos Aires International Festival of Independent Cinema, Best Actor for Alejandro Ferretis
- 2003 Guadalajara International Film Festival, Best Screenplay for Carlos Reygadas
- 2003 Guadalajara International Film Festival, Best Art Direction for Alejandro Reygadas
