= Our Time (2018 film) =

2018 film

- Film poster
- Directed by: Carlos Reygadas
- Written by: Carlos Reygadas
- Starring: Carlos Reygadas
- Release date: 5 September 2018 (Venice)
- Running time: 174 minutes
- Country: Mexico
- Language: Spanish

Our Time (Spanish: Nuestro tiempo) is a 2018 Mexican drama film directed by Carlos Reygadas. It was selected to be screened in the main competition section of the 75th Venice International Film Festival.

== Plot ==
In the Mexican countryside, a family raises fighting bulls. The world-renowned poet husband, Juan, raises and selects the bulls while his wife, Esther, runs the ranch. Despite their open relationship, the couple’s relationship begins to fall apart when Juan becomes jealous of Phil, Esther’s American horse-breaker lover.

== Cast ==
- Carlos Reygadas
- Natalia López
- Phil Burgers
- Rut Reygadas
- Eleazar Reygadas
