= Arie Esiri =

Nigerian director

- Esiri at the 2026 Toronto International Film Festival.

Arie Esiri is a Nigerian filmmaker. Born in Warri, Nigeria, he was raised in Lagos. He went to college first in England, and then studied film at Columbia University School of the Arts in the United States, graduating in 2019. The brothers produced two shorts while in film school, Besida and Goose. The Esiri brothers' debut feature Eyimofe premiered at the Berlin Film Festival in 2020. Esiri favors the cinematographic side of directing. The Siskel Film Center in Chicago described Eyimofe as "shot on richly textured 16 mm film and infused with the spirit of neorealism...[yielding] vivid snapshot of life in contemporary Lagos, whose social fabric is captured in all its vibrancy and complexity."

He co-directed Clarissa, a film adaptation of Mrs Dalloway, to be distributed by Neon, with his twin brother Chuko Esiri. The film premiered at the 2026 Cannes Film Festival in May. He was nominated for Best Feature at the 2026 Gotham Film Awards as one of the producers of Clarissa.
