= Chuko Esiri =

Nigerian director and screenwriter

- Esiri at the 2026 Toronto International Film Festival.
- Born: Warri, Nigeria
- Education: NYU Tisch School of the Arts
- Occupations: Filmmaker, screenwriter, producer, director

Chuko Esiri is a Nigerian filmmaker. Born in Warri, Nigeria, he was raised in Lagos. He went to college first in England, and then studied at NYU Tisch School of the Arts in the United States. Esiri and his twin brother Arie Esiri produced two shorts while in film school, Besida and Goose. The Esiri brothers' debut feature Eyimofe premiered at the Berlin Film Festival in 2020. Esiri wrote the screenplay for the upcoming Mrs. Dalloway adaptation Clarissa, distributed by Neon, and co-directed with his brother.
