= List of Ukrainian submissions for the Academy Award for Best International Feature Film =

Best International Feature Film submissions from Ukraine

Highlights
- Debut: 1997
- Submissions: 19
- Nominations: none
- Oscar winners: none

Ukraine has submitted films for the Academy Award for Best International Feature Film (Note: The category was previously named the Academy Award for Best Foreign Language Film, but this was changed to the Academy Award for Best International Feature Film in April 2019, after the Academy deemed the word "Foreign" to be outdated.) since 1997. The award is handed out annually by the United States Academy of Motion Picture Arts and Sciences to a feature-length motion picture produced outside the United States that contains primarily non-English dialogue.

As of 2026, Ukraine has submitted nineteen films, but none of them were nominated.

== Submissions ==
The Academy of Motion Picture Arts and Sciences has invited the film industries of various countries to submit their best film for the Academy Award for Best International Feature Film since 1956. The International Feature Film Committee oversees the process and reviews all the submitted films. Following this, they vote via secret ballot to determine the five nominees for the award.

Prior to its independence, Ukrainian film Wartime Romance (1984) was selected by the Soviet Union, but it was not nominated.

A Driver for Vera (2004) was disqualified for being a majority-Russian production. The film was largely shot in Ukraine, and was a co-production between Russian and Ukrainian production companies, but the film was made in Russian by a Russian filmmaker, Pavel Chukhray, who had been nominated representing Russia in 1997. In 2006, a Columbia University film professor alleged that Ukraine's selection process was opaque, and that cancer drama Aurora had never actually screened in accordance with AMPAS rules. Despite the protest, Aurora was accepted and screened.

In 2007, it was rumored that Ukraine would finally form a special committee to annually choose a Ukrainian nominee and that supposedly the movie Koroliova would be selected in 2007 as Ukraine's submission. However, eventually it was revealed that the committee did not meet to choose a nominee.

In 2014, the decision to submit Oles Sanin's The Guide ahead of the more acclaimed festival hit The Tribe by Myroslav Slaboshpytskyi, sparked a controversy that resulted in accusations of collusion by several members of the country's selection committee, who were forced to step down.

In 2015, Ukraine missed the deadline to submit a film. They requested an extension from the Academy but it was denied.

20 Days in Mariupol (2023) advanced to the December shortlist, but it was not nominated.

Below is a list of the films that have been submitted by Ukraine for review by the Academy for the award by year and the respective Academy Awards ceremony.

Year (Ceremony)	Film title used in nomination	Original title	Language(s)	Director(s)	Result
1997 (70th)	A Friend of the Deceased	Приятель небіжчика	Russian, Ukrainian	Viacheslav Kryshtofovych	Not nominated
2003 (76th)	Mamay	Мамай	Ukrainian, Crimean Tatar	Oles Sanin	Not nominated
2004 (77th)	A Driver for Vera	Водій для Віри	Russian	Pavel Chukhray	Disqualified
2006 (79th)	Aurora	Аврора	Russian	Oksana Bairak	Not nominated
2008 (81st)	Illusion of Fear	Ілюзія страху	Russian, Ukrainian	Oleksandr Kiriyenko	Not nominated
2012 (85th)	Firecrosser	Той, хто пройшов крізь вогонь	Ukrainian, English, Russian, Crimean Tatar	Mykhailo Illienko	Not nominated
2013 (86th)	Paradjanov	Параджанов	Russian, Ukrainian	Serge Avedikian, Olena Fetisova	Not nominated
2014 (87th)	The Guide	Поводир	Ukrainian, Russian, English	Oles Sanin	Not nominated
2016 (89th)	Ukrainian Sheriffs	Українські шерифи	Ukrainian, Russian	Roman Bondarchuk	Not nominated
2017 (90th)	Black Level	Рівень чорного	No dialogue	Valentyn Vasianovych	Not nominated
2018 (91st)	Donbass	Донбас	Russian, Ukrainian	Sergei Loznitsa	Not nominated
2019 (92nd)	Homeward	Додому	Crimean Tatar, Ukrainian	Nariman Aliev	Not nominated
2020 (93rd)	Atlantis	Атлантида	Ukrainian	Valentyn Vasyanovych	Not nominated
2021 (94th)	Bad Roads	Погані дороги	Russian, Ukrainian	Nataliia Vorozhbyt	Not nominated
2022 (95th)	Klondike	Клондайк	Ukrainian, Russian, Chechen, Dutch	Maryna Er Gorbach	Not nominated
2023 (96th)	20 Days in Mariupol	20 днів у Маріуполі	Ukrainian, Russian	Mstyslav Chernov	Made shortlist
2024 (97th)	La Palisiada	Ля Палісіада	Ukrainian, Azerbaijani, Russian	Philip Sotnychenko	Not nominated
2025 (98th)	2000 Meters to Andriivka	2000 метрів до Андріївки	Ukrainian, English	Mstyslav Chernov	Not nominated
2026 (99th)	Traces	Сліди	Ukrainian	Alisa Kovalenko, Marysia Nikitiuk	Pending

== Shortlisted finalists ==
- In 2025, Divia was also shortlisted alongwith other seven films for consideration.
- In 2020, The Earth Is Blue as an Orange by Iryna Tsilyk and My Thoughts Are Silent by Antonio Lukich were also shortlisted for consideration.

== See also ==
- List of Academy Award winners and nominees for Best International Feature Film
- List of Academy Award-winning foreign language films
- List of Soviet submissions for the Academy Award for Best International Feature Film
