= Mamay (disambiguation) =

Mamay (fl. c. 1370) was an East-European soldier and ruler.

Mamay may refer to:

- Mamay (film), a 2003 Ukrainian film
- Mamay: A Journey to Greatness, a 2025 Philippine biographical film
- Mamay (lake), Kazakhstan

== See also ==
- Cossack Mamay, legendary character in Ukrainian folklore
