= The Guide (film) =

2013 film

- Film poster
- Directed by: Oles Sanin
- Written by: Oles Sanin; Alexander Irvanets; Irene Rozdobudko; Paul Wolansky
- Produced by: Maxim Asadchiy; Igor Savychenko; Oles Sanin
- Starring: Stanislav Boklan; Jeff Burrell; Anton Sviatoslav Greene; Oleksandr Kobzar; Jamala; Iryna Sanina
- Cinematography: Serhiy Mykhalchuk
- Edited by: Denys Zakharov
- Music by: Alla Zahaikevych
- Production company: Pronto Film
- Distributed by: B&H Film Distribution
- Release dates: 16 July 2014 (Odesa); 12 November 2014 (Ukraine)
- Running time: 122 minutes
- Country: Ukraine
- Languages: Ukrainian; Russian; English
- Box office: ₴2.5 million

The Guide (Ukrainian: «Поводир», romanized: Povodyr) is a 2014 Ukrainian drama film directed by Oles Sanin. The film stars Stanislav Boklan, Anton Greene, Jeff Burrell, Iryna Sanina and Jamala. It focuses around a young Peter Shamrock who serves as the guide of a blind bard in Soviet Ukraine. There is a special audiodescripted version for blind people.

The film was produced by Pronto Film with a budget of about ₴16,762,000, with the Ukrainian State Film Agency financing parts. The film would then go on to make ₴16.6 million, although ₴14.1 million was given back to the Ukrainian State Film Agency, making the true amount at around ₴2.5 million. It was selected as the Ukrainian entry for the Best Foreign Language Film at the 87th Academy Awards, but was not nominated. There was some controversy over the selection of the film in Ukraine regarding the voting process.

Following the Russian Invasion of Ukraine, several cinemas including Regal Cinemas began screenings of The Guide to raise money for relief efforts in Ukraine through the Ukraine Relief Fund. On 13 March 2022, a screening of The Guide in Salem, Massachusetts, was attended by the Governor of Massachusetts, Charlie Baker, and Congressman Seth Moulton. By 17 March 2022, it was screened across 600 cinemas in the United States.

== Plot ==
Set during the early 1930s in Soviet Ukraine, American engineer Michael Shamrock arrives in Kharkiv with his ten-year-old son, Peter to help "build socialism". He falls in love with an actress Olga, of whom she has another admirer, Commissar Vladimir. However, Michael gets his hands onto secret documents about a planned mass seizure of food by the Soviets. As a result, he is killed whilst boarding a train. Peter then escapes his father's killers by hiding into the car of another train.

Peter is then saved by a blind bard (kobzar) named Ivan Kocherga. With no other chance to survive in a foreign land, Peter becomes Ivan's guide. Meanwhile, Vladimir dedicates himself to find Peter.

== Cast ==
- Stanislav Boklan as Ivan Kocherga
- Jeff Burrell as Michael Shamrock
- Anton Sviatoslav Greene as Peter Shamrock
- Oleksandr Kobzar as Comrade Vladimir
- Iryna Sanina as Orysia
- Jamala as Olga

== Reception ==
Since its release, The Guide has generated generally favourable reviews.

On IMDb, The Guide has an average rating of 7.7/10.

== Awards and nominations ==
Following the announcement of The Guide being nominated by the Ukrainian Oscar committee, several individuals left the committee in protest including the head of the Ukrainian Association of Cinematographers, Serhiy Trymbach.

Year	Award	Category	Nominee	Result
2014	Odesa International Film Festival	Best Actor	Stanislav Boklan	Won
2014	Odesa International Film Festival	Jury Prize for Cinematography	Sergiy Mykhalchuk	Won
2014	Odesa International Film Festival	Grand Prix	Oles Sanin	Nominated
2014	Warsaw International Film Festival	Grand Prix	Oles Sanin	Nominated
2015	Universe Multicultural Film Festival	Grand Prix for the best movie	Oles Sanin	Won

== See also ==
- List of submissions to the 87th Academy Awards for Best Foreign Language Film
- List of Ukrainian submissions for the Academy Award for Best Foreign Language Film
- Persecuted bandurists
- Famine-33 (1991)
- Kobzar
