= Nikitiuk =

Nikitiuk is a surname. People associated with the surname include:

- Lesia Nikitiuk
- Marysia Nikitiuk
