= Pets United =

2019 animated film

- Theatrical Release poster
- Directed by: Reinhard Klooss
- Written by: Reinhard Klooss
- Based on: Die Konferenz der Tiere by Erich Kästner; Animals United by Oliver Huzly and Reinhard Klooss
- Produced by: Hua Shen; Reinhard Klooss; Yan Xun
- Starring: Patrick Roche; Natalie Dormer; Eddie Marsan; Jeff Burrell
- Edited by: Alexander Dittner
- Music by: David Newman
- Production companies: Joyhil Media And Culture; Screencraft Entertainment; Timeless Films; Eurosino Entertainment GmbH; China Film Group; Fish Blowing Bubbles; PlayArte Pictures
- Distributed by: Netflix
- Release date: 8 November 2019
- Running time: 92 minutes
- Countries: Germany; China; United Kingdom
- Language: English
- Box office: $4.4 million

Pets United is a 2019 animated comedy film directed and written by Reinhard Klooss and starring Natalie Dormer, Eddie Marsan, and Jeff Burrell. It serves as a standalone sequel to the 2010 film Animals United.

The film premiered in China on 8 November 2019. In the United States, Netflix added the film to its streaming service on 11 September 2020, and was panned by critics.

== Plot ==
In Robotic City, Roger, a Robin Hood-esque blue heeler, tries to get some chicken drumsticks, but he instead successfully gives boxes of cat food to stray animals in the alley. When he tries to fetch food for himself, he’s discovered by Belle, a Siamese cat, who is hostile to him. He’s forced to run away when her owner appears, saying to Belle that mice got into her perfume again. Roger retreats to an apartment building top, where he has a makeshift home for himself. He befriends Bobby, a talkative robot who resides in Robotic City.

Roger then gets taken to Pampered Pets, where he encounters various pets. They have a mission to stop the mastermind of chaos.

== Cast ==
- Patrick Roche as Roger (speaking voice and vocal effects), a Robin hood-esque blue heeler, and the main protagonist.
- Stephen Mangan as Bob, a robot with feelings "that was not the most successful business idea".
- Natalie Dormer as Belle (speaking voice and vocal effects), a Siamese cat.
- Eddie Marsan as Frank Stone, Roger's long-lost owner, and The Mayor, Frank Stone's evil cyborg counterpart, the main antagonist.
- Jeff Burrell as Ronaldo, a black and white Italian-accented poodle.
- Harvey Friedman as Walter, a pug.
- Ian Odle as Sheriff Bill, a robot policeman who chases after Roger but fails at every turn, and Brian, an elderly Chinese-accented tarsier.
- Bryan Larkin as Beezer, a Scottish-accented proboscis monkey, and as Slomo, a red panda obsessed with smoothies.
- Naomi McDonald as Joy, and Chichi, a Chihuahua.
- John Tara as Edgar, a hamster.
- Andres Williams as Tiger, a guinea pig with a pink ribbon and as Victor, a dim-witted Komodo dragon.
- Teresa Gallagher as Sophie (speaking voice and vocal effects), a hillbilly bushpig.
- Frank Schaff as Asgar (speaking voice and vocal effects), a Russian-accented Siberian tiger.
- Tom Haywood as Stan, a hysterical spotted hyena.
- Mike Ryan as Boris, an armored robot who is one of The Mayor's henchmen, until he turns against him.

== Release ==
Pets United was released on 8 November 2019 in China.

== Reception ==
Pets United earned $4,440,894 at the global box office.

Roger Moore of Movie Nation gave the film 1.5 out of 4 stars, writing: "'Pets United' could struggle a bit even to keep a toddler distracted for 92 minutes."
