= Julia Sinkevych =

Julia Sinkevych (8 November 1983, Kyiv) is a Ukrainian film producer.

== Career ==
She is known for Lesya Ukrainka by Nana Janelidze; Ya, Nina by Marysia Nikitiuk and It's not a full picture by Maryna Stepanska.

Sinkevych worked as the general producer of the Odesa International Film Festival from 2010 to 2020 and is a co-founder of the Ukrainian Film Academy. She is also a member of the Ukrainian Oscars Committee and the European Film Academy. Films she has produced include Heat Singers by Nadia Parfan, Close Relations by Vitaly Mansky, Lucky Girl by Marysia Nikitiuk, and Lesia by Nana Janelidze. In March 2022, she was named Jury President for the year's Series Mania film festival in Lille, France. She has also done programming for the Palić European Film Festival in Serbia.

At the 2022 European Film Awards, Sinkevych, along with Darya Bassel, accepted the Eurimages Co-Production Award on behalf of Ukrainian producers.

== Personal life ==
Sinkevych lived in Kyiv, but moved to her mother's home in Lviv during the 2022 Russian Invasion of Ukraine.
