= Homeward (film) =

2019 film

- Film poster
- Directed by: Nariman Aliev
- Written by: Nariman Aliev, Marysia Nikitiuk
- Starring: Akhtem Seitablaev
- Edited by: Oleksandr Chornyi
- Release dates: 22 May 2019 (Cannes); 7 November 2019 (Ukraine)
- Running time: 97 minutes
- Country: Ukraine
- Languages: Crimean Tatar; Ukrainian

Homeward (Crimean Tatar: Evge, Ukrainian: «Додому», romanized: Dodomu) is a 2019 Ukrainian drama film directed by Nariman Aliev. It was screened in the Un Certain Regard section at the 2019 Cannes Film Festival. It was selected as the Ukrainian entry for the Best International Feature Film at the 92nd Academy Awards, but it was not nominated.

== Plot ==
Crimean Tatars Mustafa and his son Alim clash after collecting the body of elder son Nazim, a casualty of the Russo-Ukrainian War. The family's history with government displacement compel Mustafa on a pilgrimage to mourn and bury in Crimean Islamic tradition. The story starts from the morgue, then on a road trip in a Jeep Cherokee from Kyiv to the volatile Crimean Peninsula. After the pair suffer sleep deprivation and irritability, the Jeep lands damaged in a ditch. Taking the vehicle to the closest auto shop, Alim meets the mechanic's grand daughter, a young Ukrainian girl who convinces him to go to the river. It is during this time the travelling party loses their wallet to a group of local boys. Alim and Mustafa become closer as they learn how to defend their passage and regain their lost possessions. Mustafa's illness is also revealed and worsens when the father and son arrive at Uncle Vasya's home. The home is not far from the family's original Crimean homeland, and Mustafa convinces Uncle Vasya to let him borrow a rowboat to complete the remaining segment of their passage.

== Cast ==
- Akhtem Seitablaev as Mustafa
- Remzi Bilyalov as Alim
- Larysa Yatzenko as Galina
- Veronika Lukyanenko as Masha
- Akmal Gurezov as Refat
- Viktor Zhdanov as Uncle Vasya
- Dariya Barikhashvili as Olesya
- Anatoliy Marempolskiy as Nazim

== Reception ==
Homeward has an approval rating of 77% on review aggregator website Rotten Tomatoes, based on 13 reviews, and an average rating of 6.2/10. Collider and The Guardian have named the film on lists of the best works of Ukrainian cinema.

== See also ==
- List of submissions to the 92nd Academy Awards for Best International Feature Film
- List of Ukrainian submissions for the Academy Award for Best International Feature Film
