= When the Trees Fall =

2018 Ukrainian film by Marysia Nikitiuk

- Directed by: Marysia Nikitiuk
- Written by: Marysia Nikitiuk
- Release date: 2018
- Country: Ukraine
- Language: Ukrainian

When the Trees Fall (Ukrainian: «Коли падають дерева», romanized: Koly padaiut dereva) is a 2018 Ukrainian film written and directed by Marysia Nikitiuk. It has been listed as among the best modern Ukrainian films.

== Plot ==
Set in the small Ukrainian city of Lozova, the film centers on a five-year-old girl, Vitka, and her older cousin, Larysa, who is in love with a criminal. The story of a five-year-old little rebellious girl Vitka with her teenage cousin Larysa and her boyfriend, the young criminal Scar unfolds in a Ukrainian provincial setting. Larysa finds herself at a crossroads after the death of her father. Yearning to be self-made, the village community ostracizes her for loving Scar. Larysa discovers her grandmother once sacrificed her love for a young gypsy abandoning him for traditional values and other people's opinions. Larysa's mother is too psychologically weak to support her daughter. Larysa and Scar plan to escape from a life of crime, misery and their relatives. But are they ready to pay the full price for freedom?

== Cast ==
- Anastasiya Pustovit as Larysa
- Sofia Halaimova as Vitka
- Maksym Samchyk as Scar

== Production ==
The film was made after Nikitiuk won the Krzysztof Kieslowski Script Award for Best Film Script from Central and Eastern Europe at the Cannes Film Festival in May 2016. The prize was accompanied with a €10,000 production grant. Her winning script would become When the Trees Fall.

When the Trees Fall was filmed in Ukraine and Poland.

== Release ==
The premiere of When the Trees Fall was at the 68th Berlin International Film Festival in 2018.

== Reception ==
When the Trees Fall won seven awards at the Berlin film festival, including best debut which came with €50,000; the Panorama audience award; the "World of Cinema" award (€4,000); the Gainer Karov award (€5,000); and three awards from film critic associations. The film was praised in The Hollywood Reporter as "bursting with audacity, flair and energetic promise." The San Francisco Chronicle called it a "deliriously lyrical, sexy fable" and said "the final frames are breathtaking." Polish film journal Kino praised Nikitiuk's "sensitivity, courage and fantasy."

When the Trees Fall is frequently named as one of the best modern Ukrainian films. It was listed as the fourth-best Ukrainian film of the 2010s by MovieWeb. Vogue Ukraine listed it among "seven films to make you fall in love with modern Ukrainian cinema". Viktoria Tihipko, president of the Odesa International Film Festival and the head of the board at the Ukrainian Film Academy, named it as one of the 30 "most iconic" films since Ukraine's independence.
