= Cossack Mamay =

Ukrainian folkloric hero

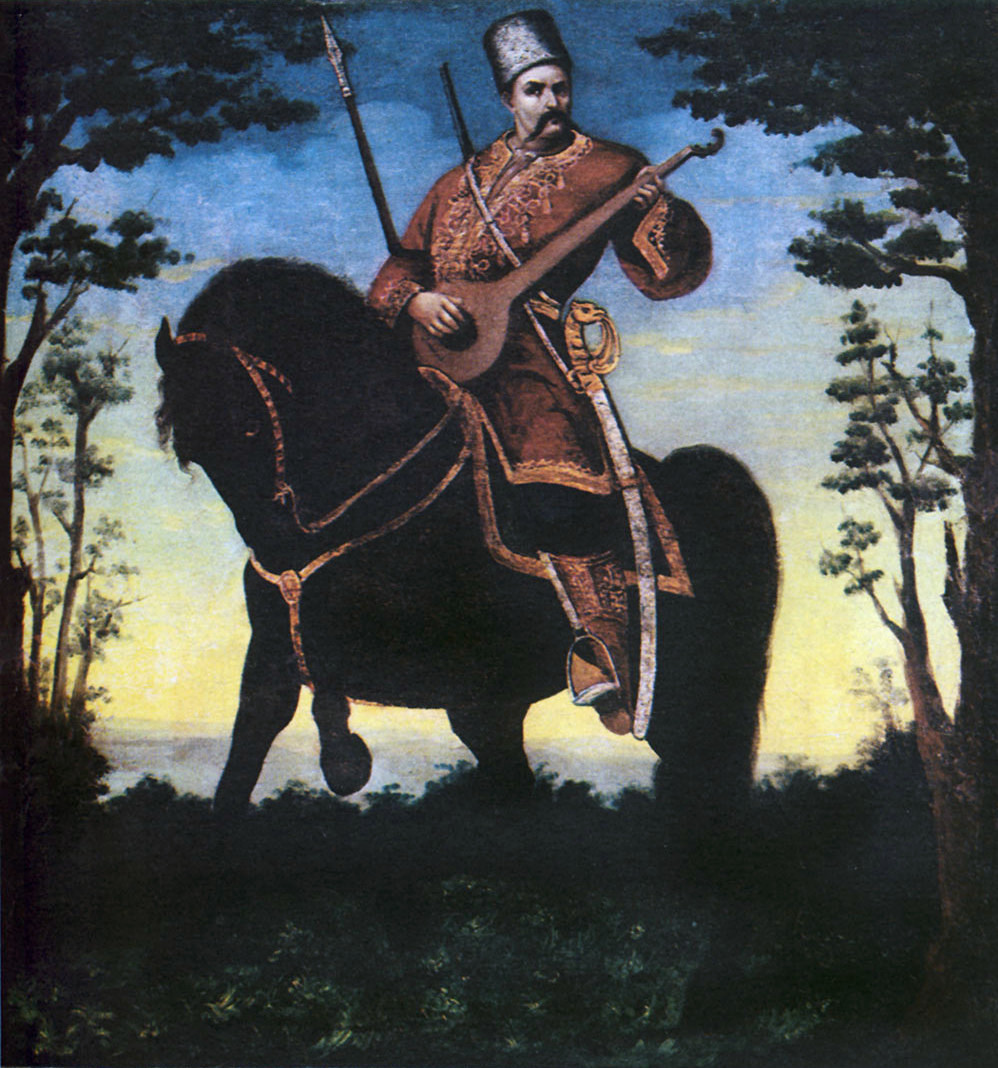
Cossack Mamay playing kobza while riding a horse

Cossack Mamay or Kozak Mamai (Ukrainian: Козак Мамай), in less significant variants also known as Cossack bandurist, is one of the most popular folklore heroes in Ukraine.

== Historical overview ==
Cossack Mamay is encountered in legends, folk stories and proverbs. These became widely popular after the dissolution of the Zaporozhian Sich in 1775. Cossack Mamay is one of the most common characters in Ukrainian folk painting, from the late 17th century to the present time. In the hundreds of surviving paintings, Cossack Mamay is usually shown with a kobza – a lute-like musical instrument that is the symbol of Ukrainian soul; a horse, which represented both freedom and fidelity; and an oak with his weapons hanging on it symbolizing the people's strength. The paintings from the time of Koliivshchyna sometimes portray Mamay on the background of violent incidents involving Poles or Jews.

"Cossack-Bandurist", "Cossack-Zaporozhets", "Cossack Mamai" are all names of paintings of the same type. The general features of the composition and the main image, their existence for several centuries in Ukrainian lands allow us to consider these works as traditional folk paintings. There are several options for them. But in all cases, the basis of the composition is always the figure of a Cossack, who mostly sits with his legs crossed.

The largest collections of this work are preserved and exhibited by the National Art Museum of Ukraine, the Dnipro Historical Museum named after Dmytro Yavornytskyi, and the Ukrainian Center of Folk Culture "Ivan Honchar Museum".

== Gallery ==
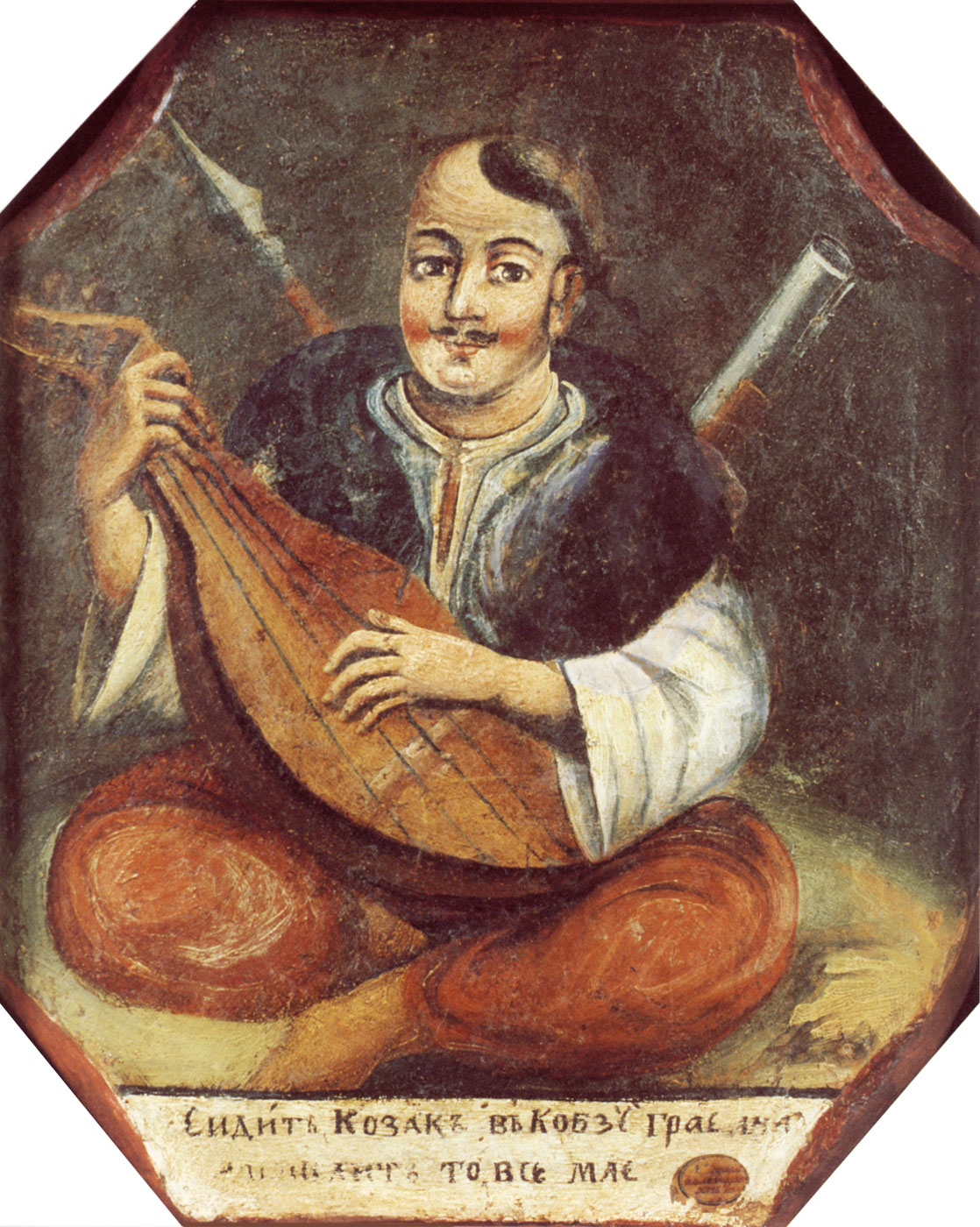
18th century

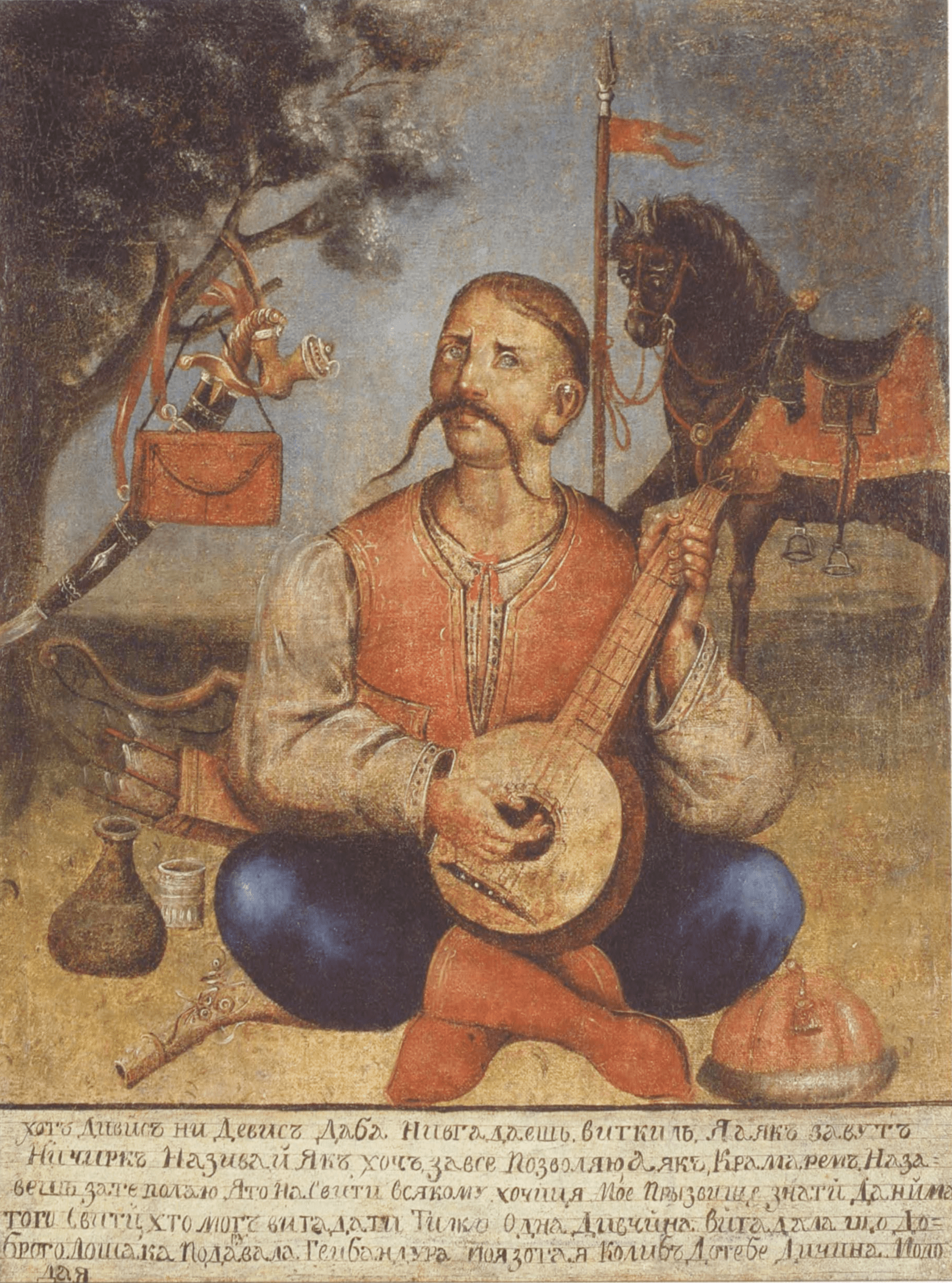
18th century

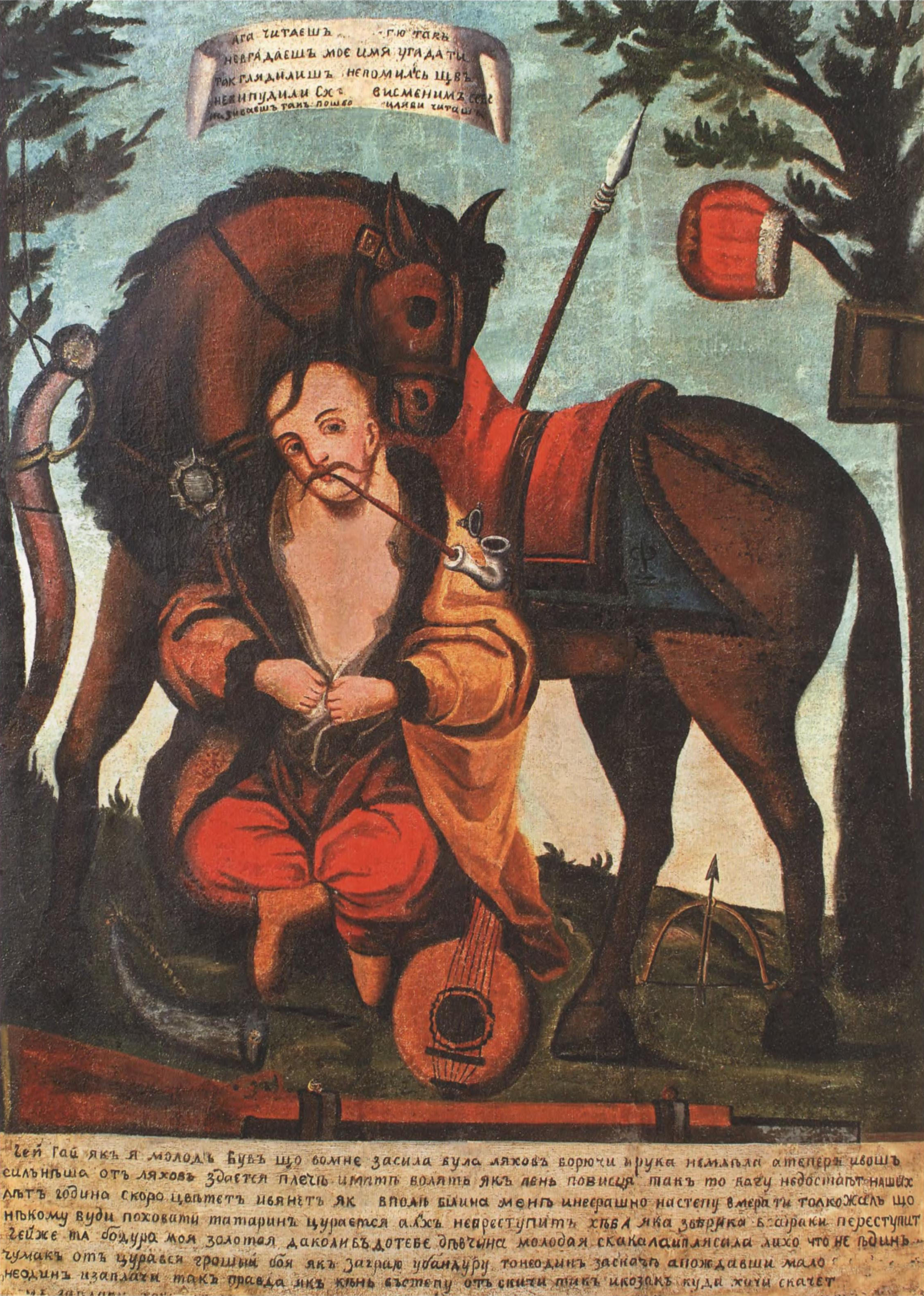
1728

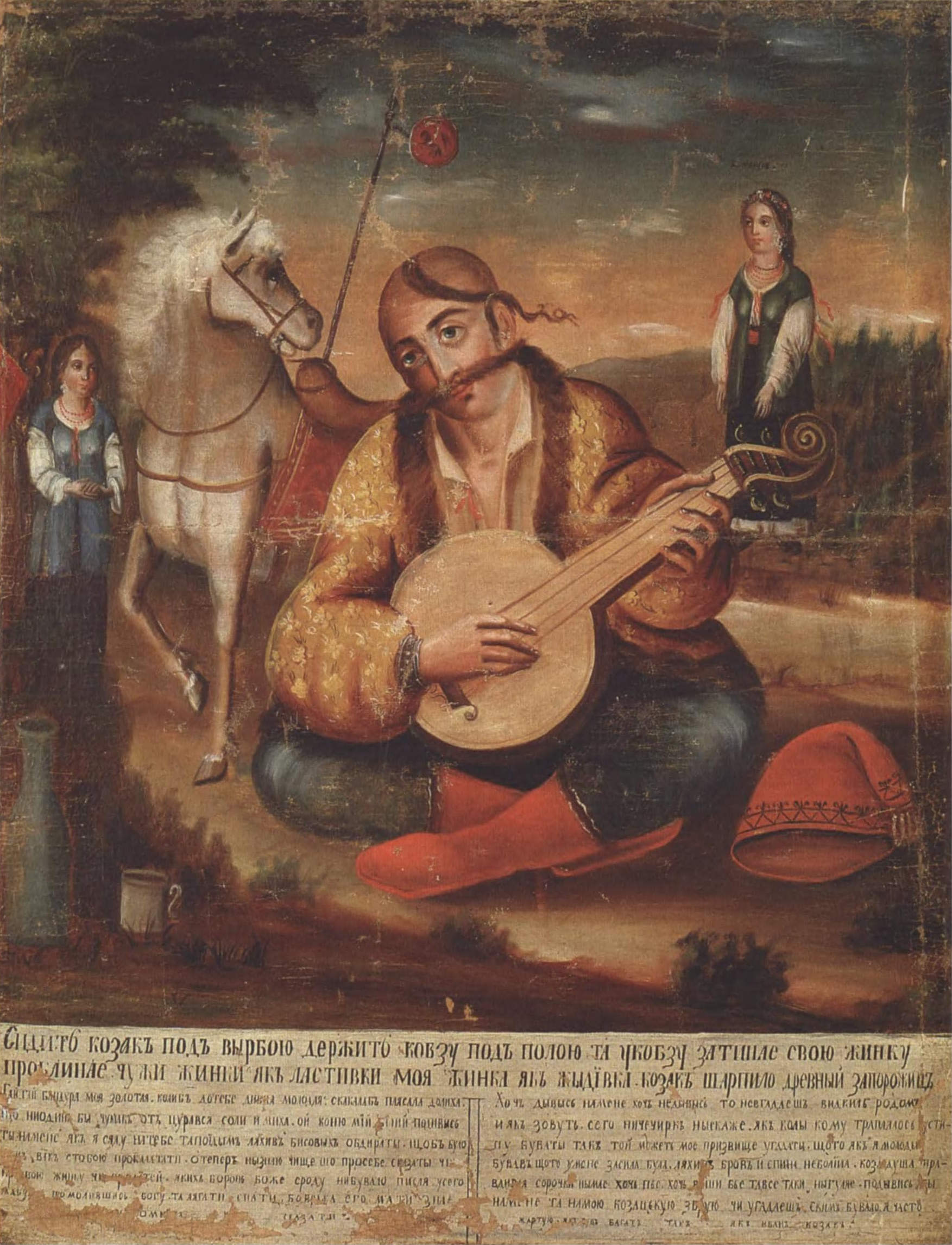
19th century

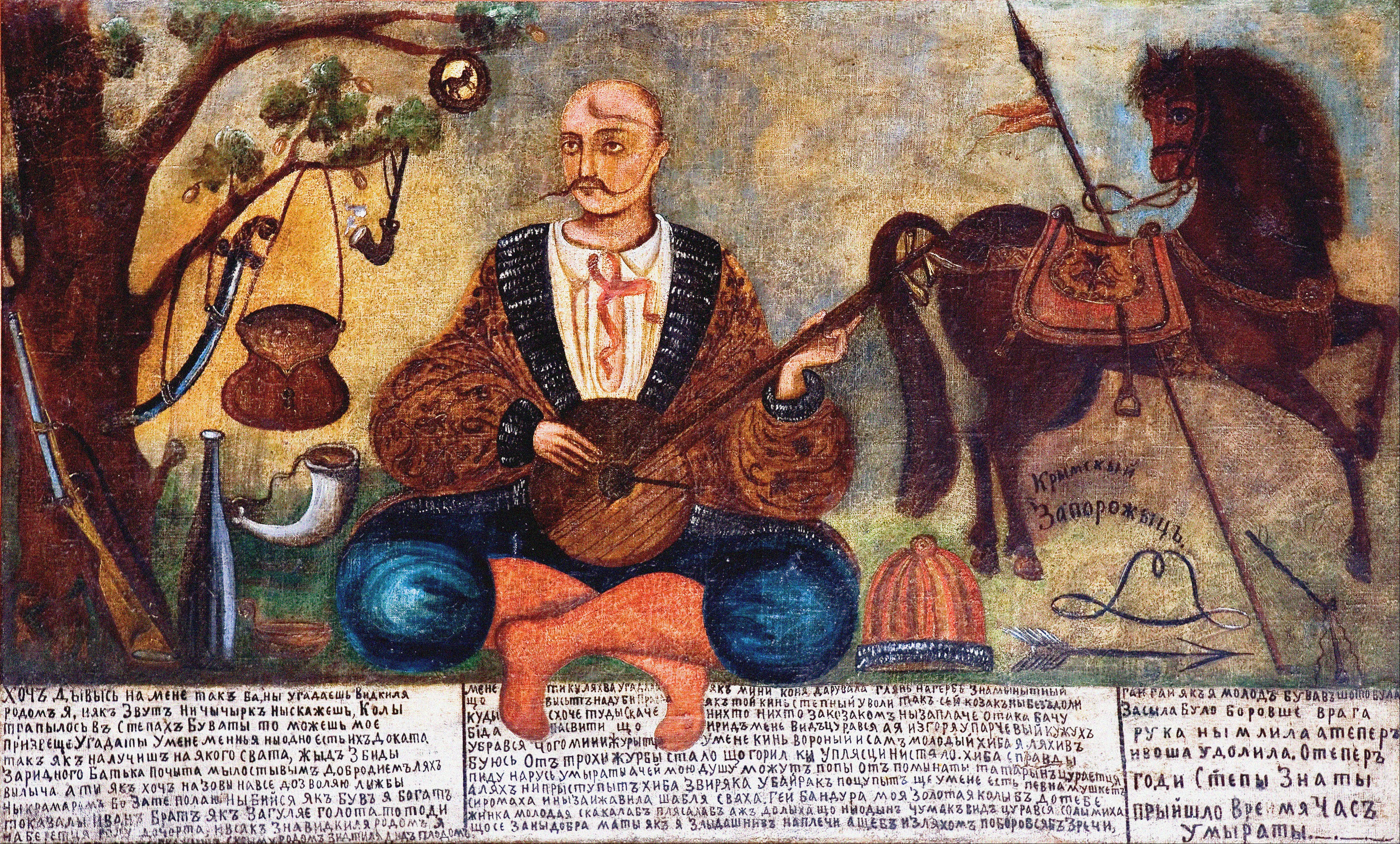
Crimea 1780/1840

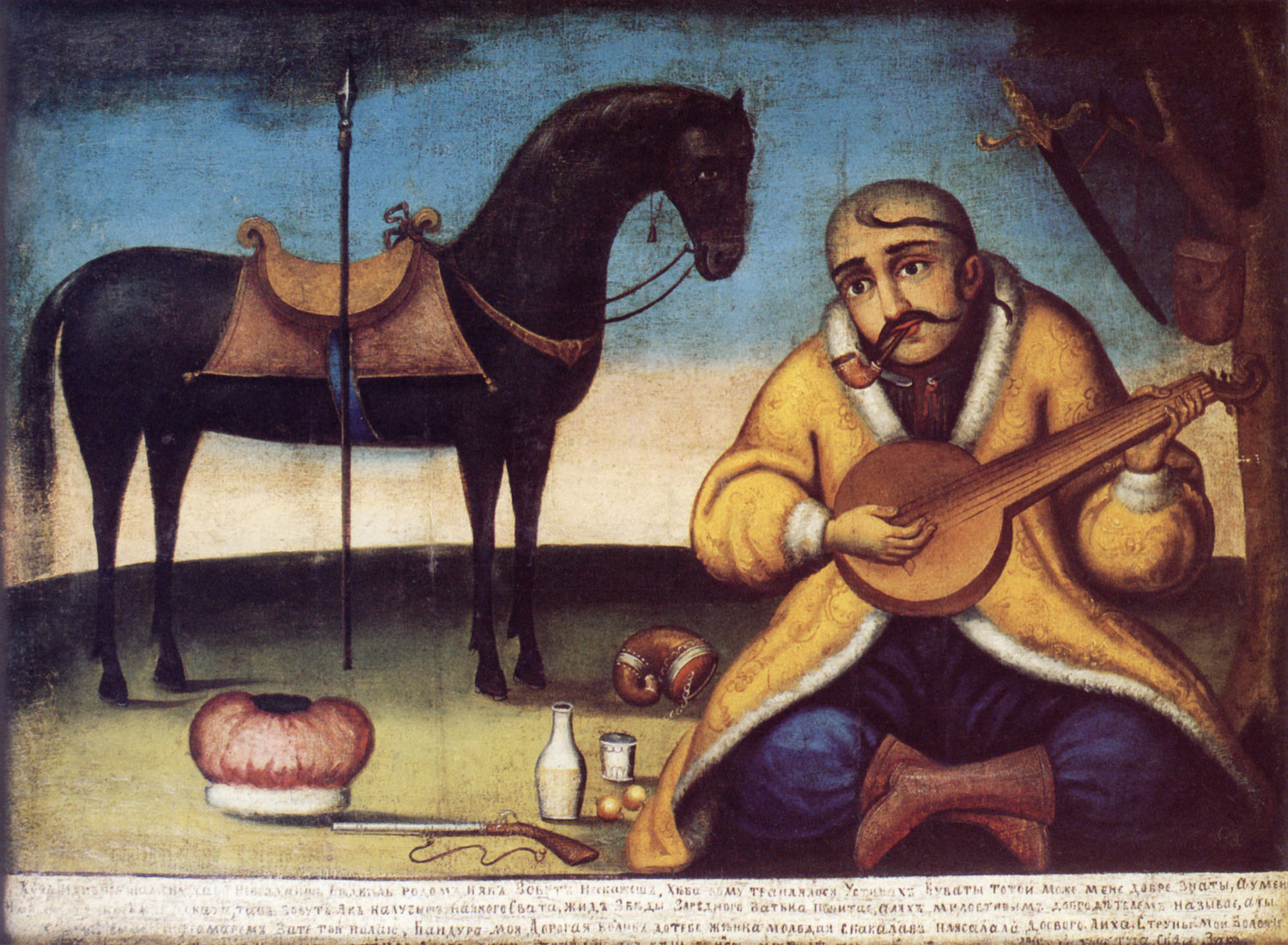
19th century

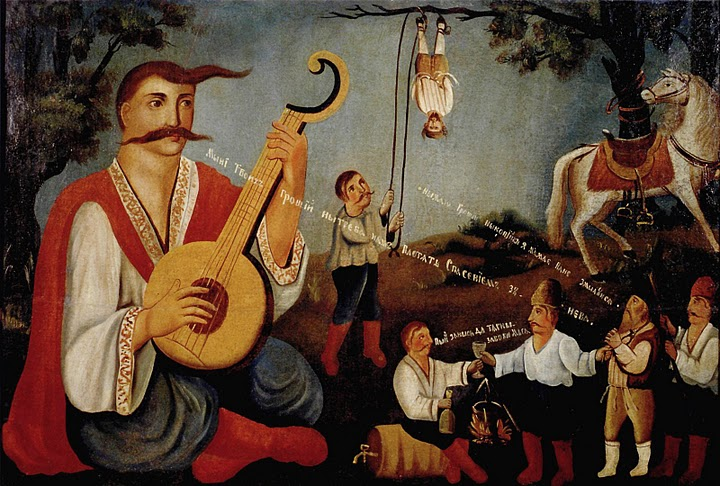
Cossack Mamay and the Haidamaka. 19th century

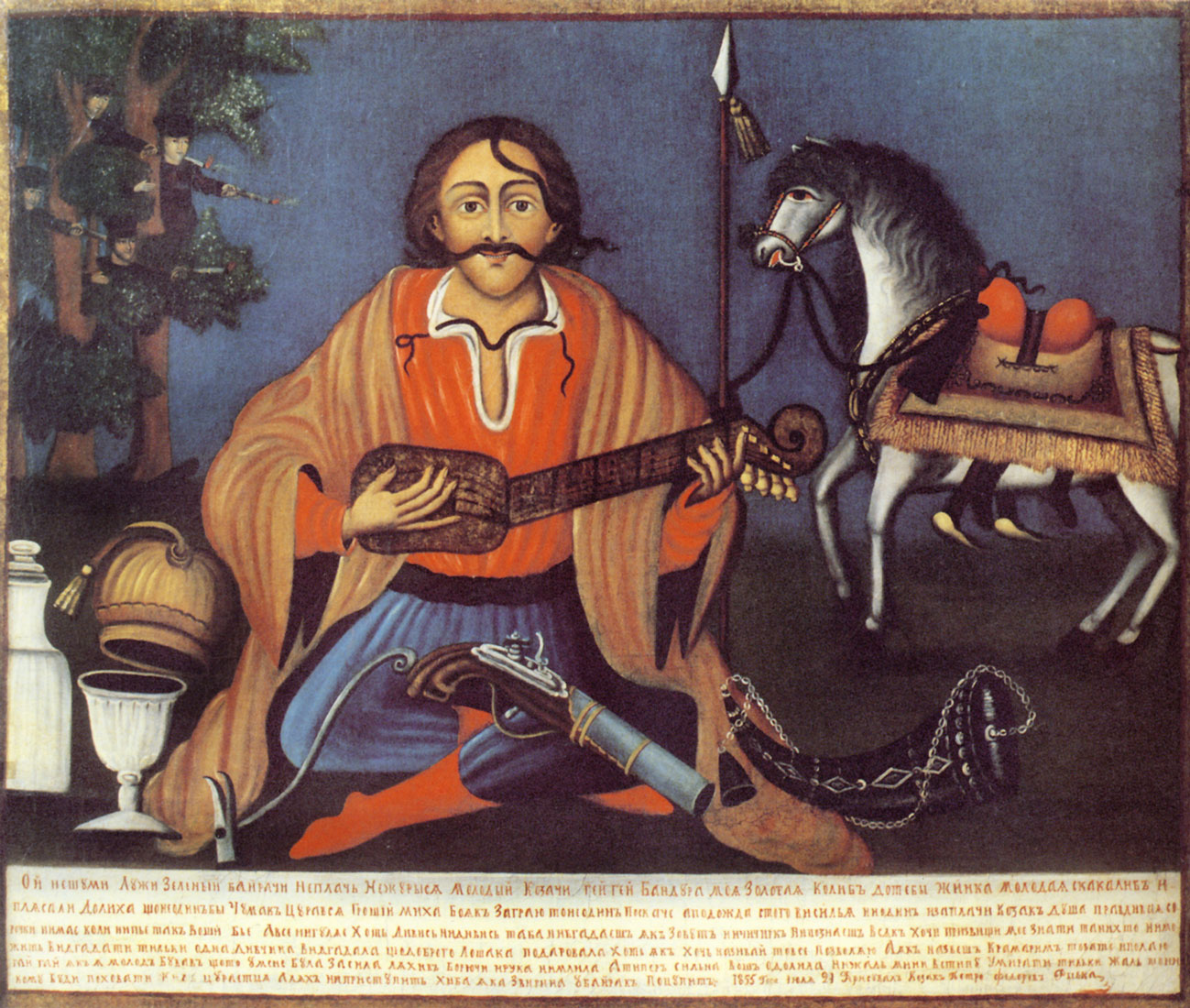
1855

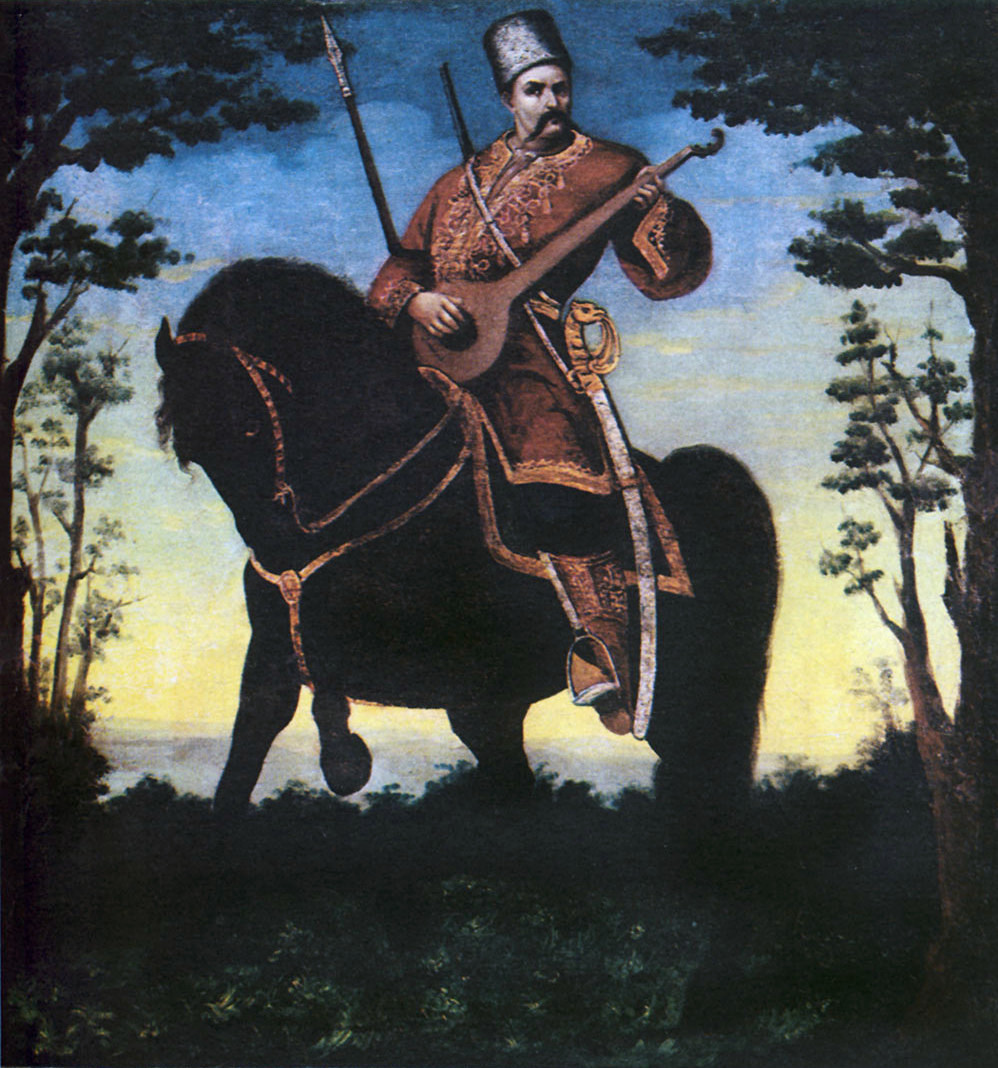
1890

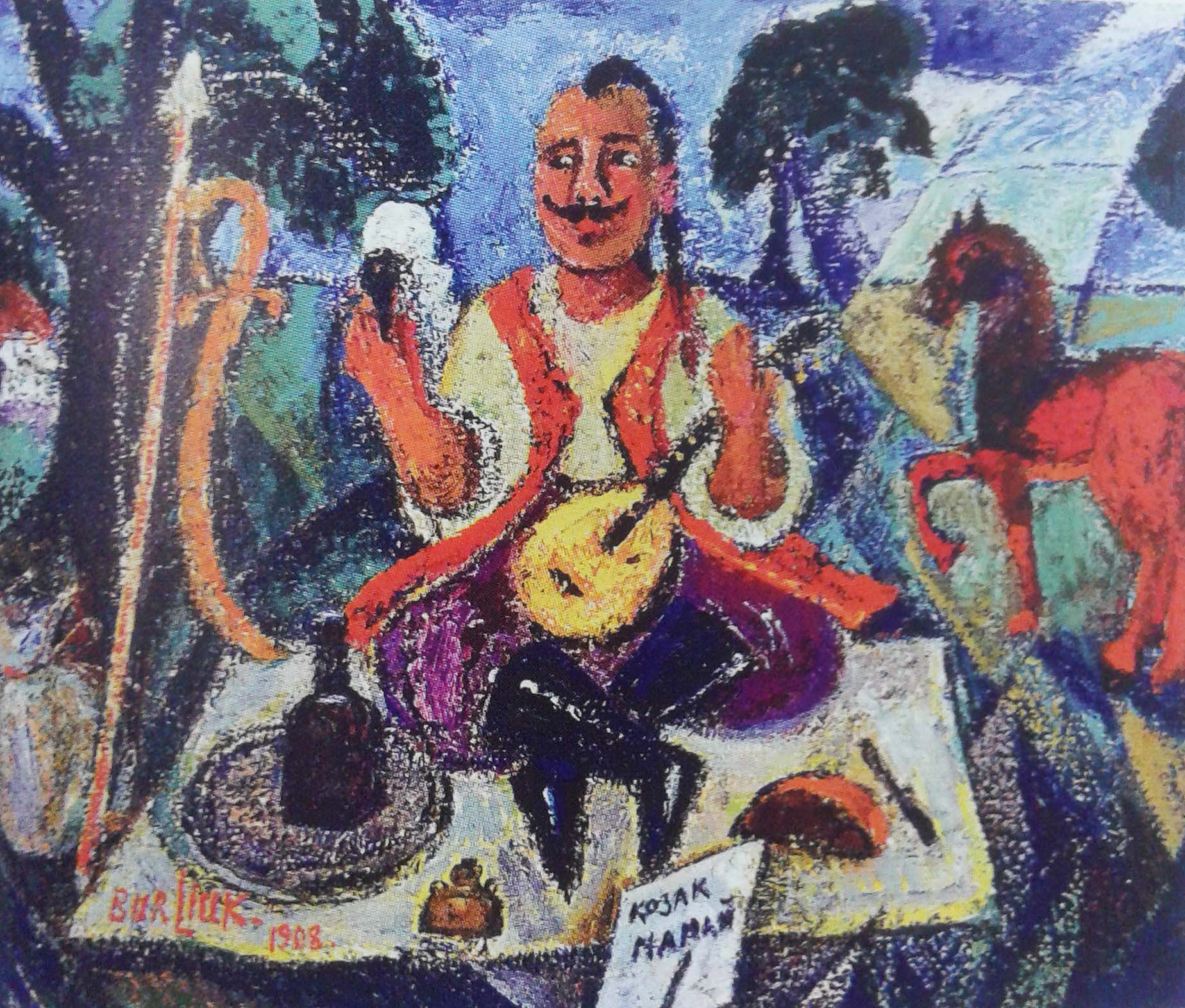
David Burliuk, 1912

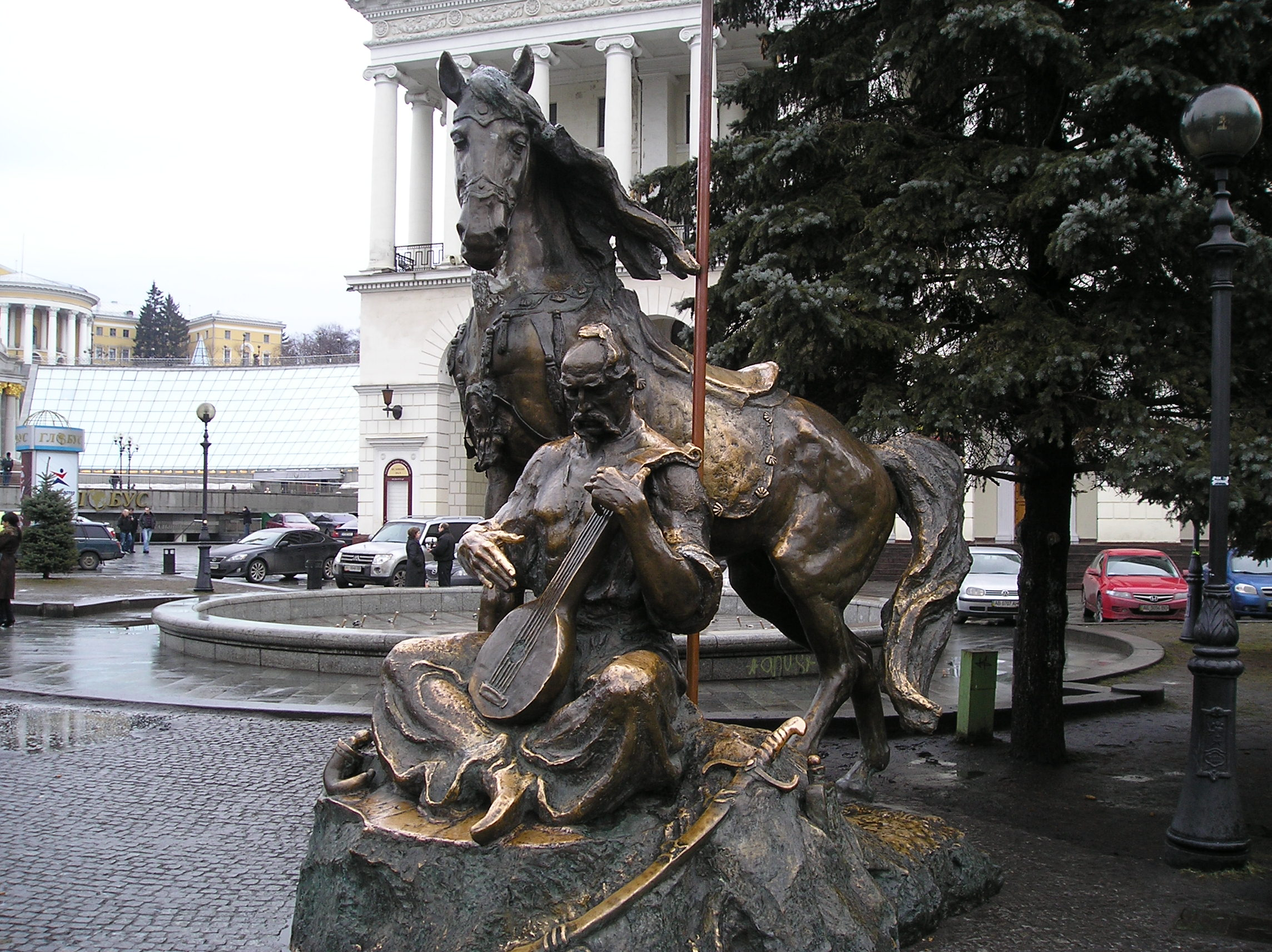
2003

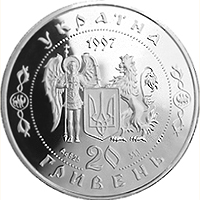
Coin obverse

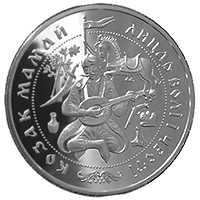
Coin, reverse

== Cossack Mamay in art ==
=== Literature ===
- No End to Cossack Kin - a novel by Olexandr Ilchenko.
- Mamay - a historical verse novel by Leonid Gorlach.
- The Cossack Mamay Myth - collection of poems by Ihor Kalynets.

=== Movie ===
In 2003, director Oles Sanin made the film Mamay at the Oleksandr Dovzhenko National Film Studio.

=== Music ===
In music, the image of Cossack Mamay was reflected in the songs of contemporary Ukrainian bands Komu Vnyz, and Vopli Vidoplyasova.

=== Street art ===
During the Revolution of Dignity, the artist Mykola Goncharov recreated the image of Cossack Mamaiya in graffiti and posters of the series "All you need is love", replacing the kobza with a Kalashnikov rifle, and the damask with a lit Molotov cocktail.

=== Cossack Mamay coin ===
On the 1997 coin minted by National Bank of Ukraine, Cossack Mamay is dressed in a rich coat with fur and sits with his legs crossed, smoking a pipe and playing a kobza. Traditional elements of Cossack military life are around Mamay: a horse with rich harness, tied to a spear with a flag planted into the ground; a green oak tree with a sabre hanging from it; a pistol and a stone powder case; Turkish kalpak (high hat), and a bottle of okovyta (Ukrainian for aqua vitae).

The coin edge has the inscriptions: (Ukrainian: Козак Мамай, Cossack Mamay) – at the left and (Ukrainian: Лицар волі і честі, Knight of Freedom and Honor) – at the right. On top, these inscriptions are separated with a small flag at the spear point and, underneath, a conventionalized guelder-rose spray.

The Mamay coin is from the "Heroes of the Cossack Age" series, Ukrainian commemorative and jubilee coins.

== See also ==
- History of the Cossacks
- Zaporizhian Host
- Kobzar
