= Yanina Sokolova =

Ukrainian journalist, television presenter (born 1984)

- Яніна Соколова
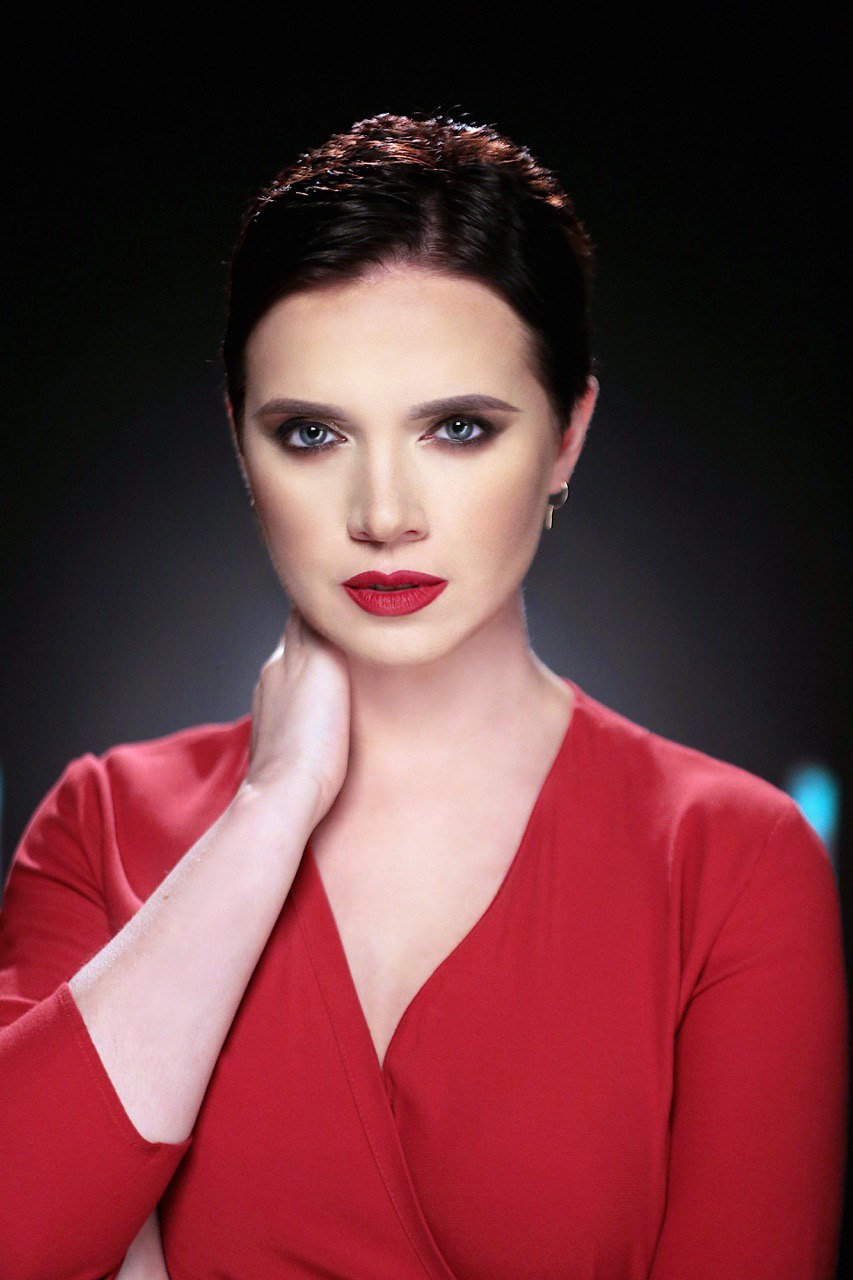
- Born: 6 March 1984 (age 42); Zaporozhye, Ukrainian SSR, Soviet Union
- Citizenship: Ukraine
- Occupations: Journalist; television presenter; actress; videoblogger
- Notable work: "Ya, Nina" (2019)

Yanina Mykhailivna Sokolova (Ukrainian: Яніна Михайлівна Соколова; born 6 March 1984) is a Ukrainian journalist, activist, television presenter and actress. She works as the host of the "Rendezvous" and "Cinema" programs on Channel 5, "Shame!" program on Channel 4 and YouTube, as well as on the "Evening with Yanina Sokolova" channel on YouTube. She is the author of the multimedia project "Ya, Nina", based on real events from her life. She is the founder of the "Varto Zhyty" foundation.

== Biography ==
Yanina Sokolova was born in Zaporizhzhia, Ukraine.

She graduated from Zaporizhzhia National University in psychology, and Taras Shevchenko National University of Kyiv in theater and film acting.

=== Early career ===
Yanina started her career in the press, she worked in the Zaporozhian publishing house "Telecity", where she wrote the column "Alone with...".

In 2000, she worked as a correspondent for the newspaper "Zaporizhian Sich". At the age of 18, she trained on the Zaporozhian channel "TV5", and in 2001 she worked as a weather forecast presenter there.

In 2003, Sokolova was the host of the program "All the money in the world" on the Luhansk regional TV channel "Lot TV".

In 2004, she was an actress at the "Free Theatre" and "Dakh Theatre", at the same time she worked as a model and starred in films.

=== 2006–2017 ===
In 2006, Sokolova returned to television industry. She started working as a presenter and journalist in the morning show "Morning on Inter". In the same year, she began acting in films. In 2007–2008, Yanina Sokolova was the host and journalist of the program "Breakfast with 1+1".

In 2009, she hosted the program "Morning on the Fifth" on Channel 5.

Since 2011, she has worked as a host of the program "Cinema with Yanina Sokolova", "Time of News", and, since 2015, the program "Rendezvous" on Channel 5. This is a project of personal interviews with top politicians, businessmen, artists, etc.

Yanina Sokolova is the founder of the school of screen arts "Screen School" and curator of the course "TV Presenter", within the "Screen School".

=== 2018–present ===
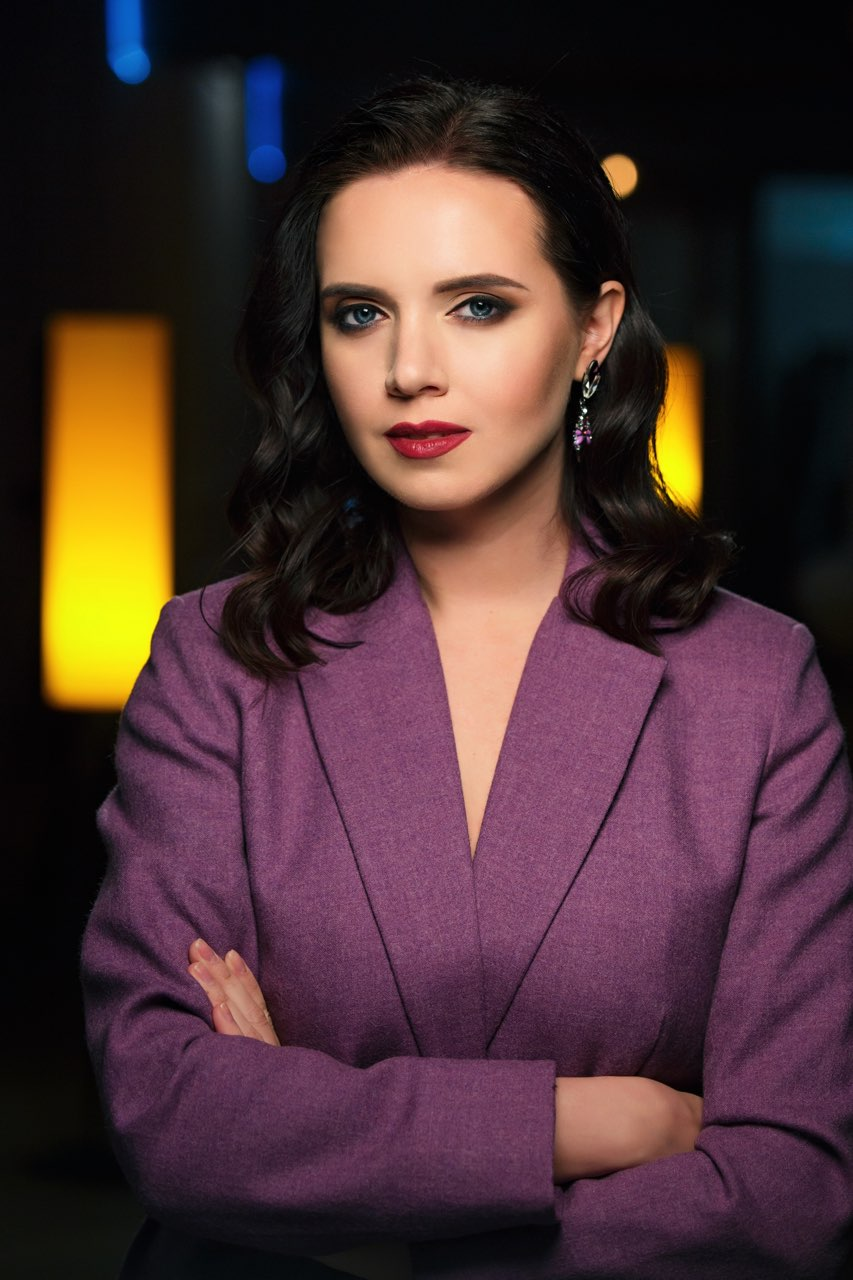
Yanina Sokolova in January 2019

In April 2018, the premiere screening of the documentary "We are soldiers" (Ukrainian: "Ми – солдати") was held in Kyiv, one of the producers of which was Yanina Sokolova.

In September 2018, the international book festival in Dnipro hosted the presentation of an interactive book "Shevchenko for every day", in which 53 videos were shot, in which Yanina Sokolova recites the poet's poems.

In October 2018, she became the host of the author's YouTube project "Evening with Yanina Sokolova".

In May 2019, Sokolova announced the multimedia project "Ya, Nina" (Ukrainian: «Я, Ніна», transl. I'm Nina), based on real events from her life. The goal of the project is to help cancer patients realize the value of life and start fighting for it. The project will consist of a book, a song and a full-length feature film, which will play Valeriya Khodos and Valery Kharchishin, and the main role will be played by Sokolova.

In 2020, Yanina Sokolova launched the author's project "Shame on you!" (Ukrainian: "Як вам не соромно") on the TV channel "Ukraine 24", which premiered on 19 March 2020. After three issues of the program, the TV channel temporarily stopped its production, citing the quarantine in Ukraine. However, a week later, Sokolova relaunched the project on her YouTube channel, but under the new name "Shame!" (Ukrainian: "Соромно!"). Since 21 April, the project is also released on Channel 4.

Yanina Sokolova is the host of the Odesa International Film Festival.

=== Recognition ===
In 2019, Yanina Sokolova took the first place in the rating of the most popular bloggers in Ukraine, according to the readers of the ICTV website. In the same year, she was included in the rating of the 100 most influential women in Ukraine by Focus magazine.

Yanina Sokolova is one of the top three people most influential on Ukrainian youth in social media, according to the International Research & Exchanges Board.

=== Public activity ===
Yanina overcame cancer by undergoing a long course of radiation and chemotherapy. As a result, she created the project "Ya, Nina" to help people suffering from cancer, change the attitude of society to cancer patients, make their lives easier and be happy.

She is a media-ambassador for the women's rights movement "HeForShe" in Ukraine.

Also, she is a volunteer of the "United Forces Operation" in Donbas.

In 2018, Yanina Sokolova supported the appeal of the European Film Academy in defense of Ukrainian Director Oleh Sentsov, who was imprisoned in Russia.

In March 2020, Yanina Sokolova founded the "Varto Zhyty" foundation, which aims to find and accumulate charitable funds raised from businesses and individuals through transparent distribution between social initiatives and projects that are just starting their activities or are already active and implementing their projects in the field of oncology.

== Filmography ==
=== Cinema ===
Year	Title	Role	Director	Notes
2009	"Obiymy mene"	Lera	Lubomyr Levytskyi	Main role, short film
2017	"The Woman"	woman	Diana Rudychenko	Main role, short film
2018	"Ya ye ilyuziya"		Stanyslav Kapralov	Short film
2018	"We are soldiers"	—N/a	Svitlana Smirnova	Yanina Sokolova is the producer of the French-Ukrainian film about the ATO soldiers
TBA	"Ya, Nina"	Nina Sokyl	Marysia Nikitiuk	Main role

=== Television ===
Year	Name	Role	Direction
2006	"Seventh Heaven"	chambermaid	Viacheslav Kryshtofovych
2006	"It's better not to know about it"	journalist	Dmytro Tomashpolskyi
2006	"Queen's First Rule"	Tamara	Viacheslav Kryshtofovych
2011	"Seven versts to heaven"	nurse	Yury Pavlov
2011	"Urgently looking for a husband"	Faith	Alina Chebotaryova
2011	"Bonesetter"	Margarita Vitkovska, Savchuk's assistant	Volodymyr Melnychenko, Vira Yakovenko
2012	"My mommy"	episode	Alina Chebotaryova
2012	"Teaching to play the guitar"	Margarita Sokolova, Oleg's fiancee	Volodymyr Yanoshchuk
2013	"Happy Family Tariff"	episode	Alina Chebotaryova
2014	"A case for two"	Lena	Anton Azarov, Karim Shikhar
2015	"Let's talk when you come back"	employee of the airport	Alina Chebotaryova
2016	"Singer"	Olesya	Oleksandr Salnikov, Mila Pogrebynska, Anton Tsivaty
2016	"Paradise place"	Angela	Dmytro Goldman
2018	"Live for love"	Berta Arnaut, owner of the club	Sergey Tolkushkin

== Theatrical work ==
Performance	Role	Theatre	Notes
"Jonathan Livingston Seagull"	Sally	Free Theatre	
"Pirandello"	Maryna	Dakh Theatre	
"Coffee and cigarettes"	actress Jane	Dakh Theatre	
"Ukrainian Decameron"	death	Dakh Theatre	
"Idiot"	Nastasya Pilipivna	Dakh Theatre	
"Love stories for adults"	woman	Maria Zankovetska Theatre	She plays with Valery Kharchishin

== Books ==
- Yanina Sokolova. "Ya, Nina". Kyiv: #knigolav. 2019. 208 pages. ISBN 978-617-7820-22-1

== Personal life ==
In May 2010, she married Volodymyr Lytvyn, a banker. The couple has two sons: Mykola and Myron.
