= Paradjanov (film) =

2013 film

- Directed by: Serge Avedikian; Olena Fetisova
- Written by: Olena Fetisova
- Starring: Serge Avedikian
- Cinematography: Serhiy Mikhalchuk
- Release dates: 4 July 2013 (Karlovy); 3 October 2013 (Ukraine)
- Running time: 95 minutes
- Country: Ukraine
- Language: Ukrainian

Paradjanov (Ukrainian: «Параджанов») is a 2013 Ukrainian biographical drama film directed by Serge Avedikian and Olena Fetisova, about film director Sergei Parajanov. The film was selected as the Ukrainian entry for the Best Foreign Language Film at the 86th Academy Awards, but it was not nominated.

== Plot ==
The film tells the story of film director Sergei Parajanov. He makes great films that bring him international recognition. His defiant behavior leads to conflict with the Soviet totalitarian regime. Parajanov is thrown into prison on trumped-up charges. But an unwavering love of beauty gives strength to create, despite years of imprisonment and a ban on working in cinema.

== Cast ==
- Serge Avedikian as Paradjanov
- Karen Badalov as Laert
- Yuliya Peresild as Svetlana

== Production ==
The film was created with the financial support of the State Cinema of Ukraine, ARTE FRANCE, the Georgian National Film Center and the Armenian National Film Center. The budget of the tape was ₴ 22.6 million (approximately 2 million Euros). The financial share of the State Cinema amounted to ₴ 11.3 million.

Filming took place in France, Ukraine (including the Drohobych Correctional Facility), Armenia, and Georgia.

== See also ==
- List of submissions to the 86th Academy Awards for Best Foreign Language Film
- List of Ukrainian submissions for the Academy Award for Best Foreign Language Film
