= Marysia Nikitiuk =

Ukrainian film director and screenwriter (born 1986)

- Марися Нікітюк
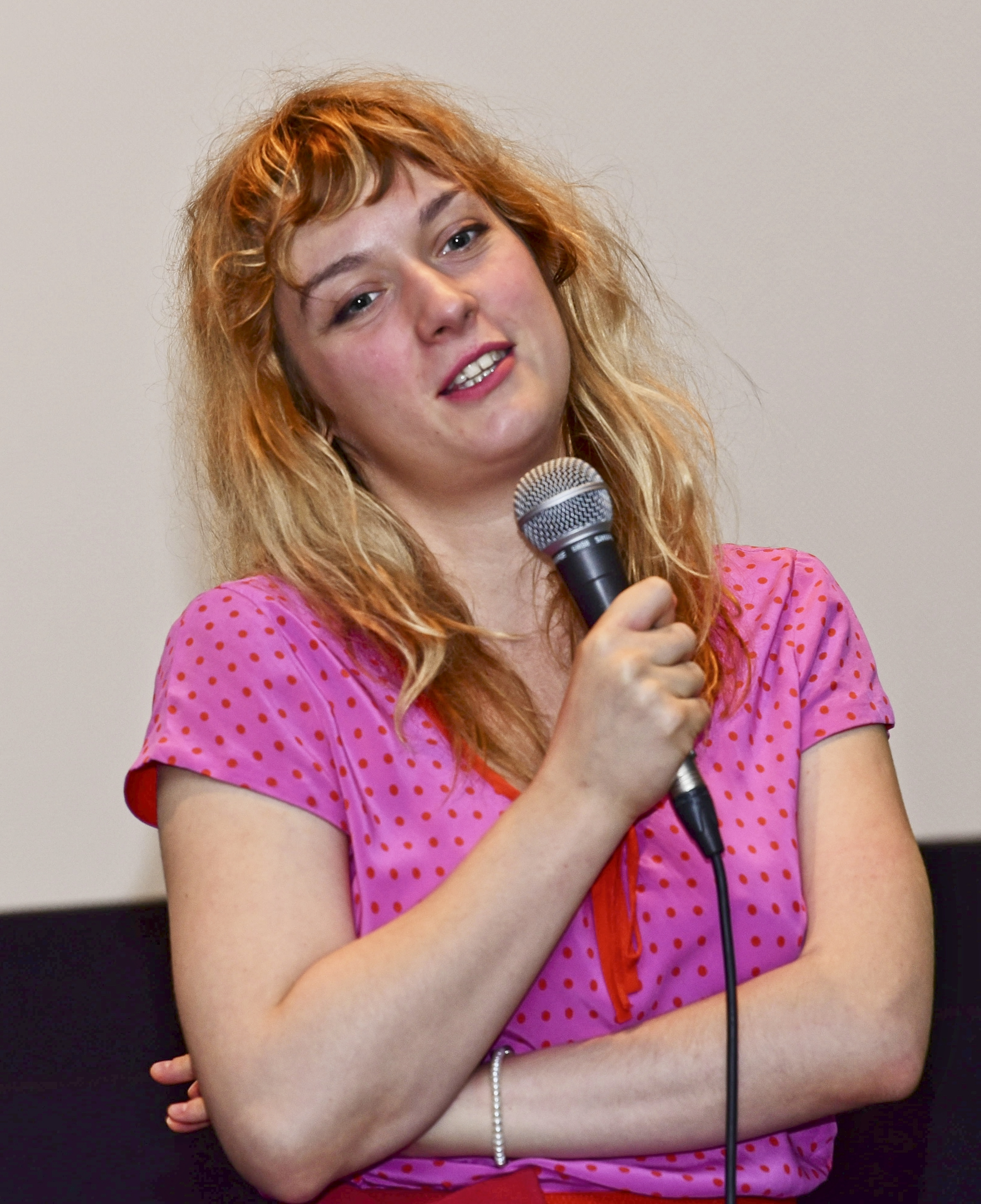
- Born: 26 October 1986 (age 39); Kyiv, Ukrainian SSR
- Education: Taras Shevchenko National University of Kyiv; Kyiv National I. K. Karpenko-Kary Theatre, Cinema and Television University
- Occupations: Film director, screenwriter
- Notable work: When the Trees Fall; Homeward

Marysia Yuriivna Nikitiuk (Ukrainian: Марися Юріївна Нікітюк; born 26 October 1986) is a Ukrainian film director, screenwriter and fiction writer. She wrote and directed When the Trees Fall (2018) and co-wrote Homeward (2019), both of which have drawn recognition as among the best Ukrainian films. Nikitiuk also directed Lucky Girl (2021), and published a collection of short fiction, The Abyss (2016), which won the Oles Ulianenko International Literary Prize.

== Early life and education ==
Nikitiuk was born in 1986. She attended Taras Shevchenko National University of Kyiv's Institute of Journalism, graduating in 2007. She then earned a master's degree in theater studies at Kyiv National I. K. Karpenko-Kary Theatre, Cinema and Television University, focusing on Japanese theater.

== Career ==
=== Early career ===
Early in her career, Nikitiuk worked in a variety of media, writing theater criticism and creating the website Teatre, directing short films, and publishing a collection of short stories (The Abyss, 2016), which won the Oles Ulianenko International Literary Prize.

=== Feature films ===
In May 2016, Nikitiuk won the Krzysztof Kieslowski ScripTeast Award for Best Film Script from Central and Eastern Europe at the Cannes Film Festival for the script that became her first feature film, When the Trees Fall. The prize was accompanied by a 10,000€ production grant. Filmed in Ukraine and Poland, When the Trees Fall premiered at the 68th Berlin International Film Festival in 2018, where it collected seven awards. Set in the small Ukrainian city of Lozova, the film centers on a five-year-old girl, Vitka, and her older cousin, Larysa, who is in love with a criminal. When the Trees Fall was praised in The Hollywood Reporter as "bursting with audacity, flair and energetic promise." The San Francisco Chronicle called it a "deliriously lyrical, sexy fable" and said "the final frames are breathtaking." Polish film journal Kino praised Nikitiuk's "sensitivity, courage and fantasy."

When the Trees Fall is frequently named as one of the best modern Ukrainian films. It was listed as the fourth-best Ukrainian film of the 2010s by MovieWeb. Vogue Ukraine listed it among "seven films to make you fall in love with modern Ukrainian cinema". Viktoria Tihipko, president of the Odesa International Film Festival and the head of the board at the Ukrainian Film Academy, named it as one of the 30 "most iconic" films since Ukraine's independence.

In 2019, Die Tageszeitung said, "Nikitiuk is regarded as the great hope of the new Ukrainian cinema." Nikitiuk notes Princess Mononoke by Hayao Miyazaki and Francis Ford Coppola's Apocalypse Now as among her favorite films, chosen for their capacity to absorb the viewer from start to finish.

Nikitiuk was a co-writer for director Nariman Aliev's Homeward, which was shown in the Un Certain Regard section of the 2019 Cannes Film Festival. It won the Grand Prix at the Odesa International Film Festival. Collider, The Guardian and Ukraine’s National Oleksandr Dovzhenko Film Centre named the film to lists of the best works of Ukrainian cinema.

Nikitiuk's next feature film was Lucky Girl, about a television star diagnosed with cancer. The story was based on real-life television presenter Yanina Sokolova's battle with cancer. Produced by Julia Sinkevych, the film played in a Ukraine in Focus section at the Cannes festival in 2022.

=== Projects in development ===
As of 2021, Nikitiuk was developing an adaptation of Vladimir Nabokov's novel Lolita, to be told from the perspective of a Ukrainian teenaged girl. At the 2022 Sarajevo Film Festival, Nikitiuk won funding for a project called Cherry Blossoms, about Ukrainian refugees. It is inspired by people she met sheltering in a village at the beginning of the 2022 Russian invasion of Ukraine.

== Personal life ==
Until the Russian invasion, Nikitiuk lived in Kyiv.
