= Jeff Burrell =

American actor

- Born: 1968 (age 57–58); Staten Island, New York
- Occupation: Actor
- Years active: 1991 – present
- Website: www.jeff-burrell.com

Jeff Burrell is an American-born actor and voice-over artist based in Germany. He has worked under Roman Polanski and Lars von Trier.

== Early years ==
Burrell was born in Staten Island, New York, in 1968. He studied acting at the High School of Performing Arts in New York City. He then got a BA in German Studies at Oberlin College in 1990. After that he was awarded a Fulbright scholarship to study acting at the Hochschule für Schauspielkunst Ernst Busch in Berlin, Germany. He got a degree in 1994, with which he was the first American to do so.

== Career ==
Burrell began his professional career at the Neues Theater [de] in Halle (Saale). He was in the acting ensemble until 2000, when he moved to Berlin.

Among other movies, Burrell acted in Roman Polanski's The Ghost Writer (2010), and Lars von Trier's Nymphomaniac (2013). He was in the spy thriller Jack Strong by Władysław Pasikowski, and was a narrator in the documentary Warsaw Uprising by Jan Komasa.

He acted in Oles Sanin's film The Guide, which was Ukraine's 2014 nomination to the Academy Awards. His acting partner was the singer Jamala, who would later go on to win the Eurovision Song Contest 2016.

Burrell won a "Best Actor Award" for his performance in the film Robin: Watch for Wishes at the Festival South Film Expo 2018.

In the fall of 2018 Burrell performed the role of Fred Madison in Yuval Sharon's production of Lost Highway at the Oper Frankfurt.

== Filmography ==
=== Film ===
Year	Title	Director	Notes
1991	Ein Mann namens Pis	Rosa von Praunheim	
2005	Peace of Mind	Detsky Graffam	Short, CobraVision Award 2006
2006	Blindflug	Ben von Grafenstein	FA Ludwigsburg
2007	Must Love Death	Andreas Schaap	HFF Konrad Wolf
2008	Rheingold	Andreas Pieper	HFF Konrad Wolf
2008	Basement	Robert Franke	
2008	Pandorum	Christian Alvart	Constantin Film
2009	American Night	Julian Rosefeldt	Art Film
2009	The Ghost Writer	Roman Polanski	
2010	Remembrance	Anna Justice	
2010	Resturlaub	Gregor Schnitzler	Deutsche Columbia Pictures
2011	The Smurfs		Dubbing, German version
2011	Muster	Clemens von Wedemeyer	Art Film for the Documenta 13
2012	Delver Glass	Matthias Greving	Short
2012	The Guide	Oles Sanin	
2012	My Friend Vijay	Sam Garbarski	
2012	Nymphomaniac Vol 1.	Lars von Trier	
2013	Jack Strong	Władysław Pasikowski	
2013	Phoenix	Christian Petzold	
2015	Point Break	Ericson Core	
2015	A Cure for Wellness	Gore Verbinski	
2015	The Confessions	Roberto Andò	
2016	Race	Stephen Hopkins	
2016	A Hologram for the King	Tom Tykwer	
2016	Bye Bye Germany	Sam Garbarski	
2018	Robin: Watch for Wishes	Kevin and Toby Schmutzler	Best Actor Award / FSFX Festival 2018

=== Television ===
Year	Title	Director	Notes
1992	The Last U-Boat	Frank Beyer	TV Film, ZDF
1996	Tatort	Hans Werner	Episode 329: Bei Auftritt Mord
2001	Joe and Max	Steve James	TV Film, Starz TV USA
2004	Spy Swap	Steven Bennett	BBC History Channel
2004	Die letzten Tage	Oliver Frohnauer	FA Ludwigsburg, ARD
2005	Auf ewig und einen Tag	Markus Imboden	TV Miniseries, ZDF
2005	Dresden	Roland Suso Richter	TV Film, ZDF
2005	Unser Charly	Christoph Klünker	Episode 11: Charly und die Leoparden, ZDF
2006	Ron Hammer	Jan Weitz	Campaign, Art Directors Award (Germany & Europe)
2006	Laible & Frisch	Michael Rösel	Series Pilot, SAT.1
2007	Das 100 Millionen Dollar Date	Josh Broecker	TV Film, SAT.1
2007	Tatort	Ralph Bohn	Episode 691: Tod einer Heuschrecke, ARD
2009	Die Geschichte der Ozeane	Stefan Schneider	Docufiction, ZDF
2010	The Children of Blankenese	Raymond Ley	Docudrama, ARD
2014	The Witness House	Matti Geschonneck	ZDF
2015	Starfighter	Miguel Alexandre	RTL
2015	Der Lack ist ab	Kai Wiesinger	Web series
2016	Tödliche Geheimnisse	Sherry Hormann	ZDF
2016	Berlin Station	John David Coles	Netflix
2018	Börü	Cem Özüduru	Star TV, Turkey
2018	Illegals	Leszek David	Canal+, Poland
2018	Der Staatsanwalt	Ayşe Polat	Episode: Abrechnung im Blut
