= Ukrainian Sheriffs =

2015 documentary film by Roman Bondarchuk

- Directed by: Roman Bondarchuk
- Written by: Roman Bondarchuk
- Produced by: Daryna Averchenko; Uldis Sekulis
- Edited by: Roman Bondarchuk; Katerina Gornostay; Borys Peter
- Music by: Anton Baibakov
- Release dates: 20 November 2015 (IDFA); 26 March 2016 (DocuDays UA)
- Running time: 88 minutes
- Countries: Ukraine; Latvia; Germany
- Languages: Ukrainian; Russian

Ukrainian Sheriffs (Ukrainian: «Українські шерифи», romanized: Ukrainski sheryfy) is a 2015 Ukrainian documentary film directed by Roman Bondarchuk. The film begins as a portrait of a small town which tries to meet its own policing needs but shifts when the Russo-Ukrainian War begins, depicting the war's effects in microcosm. Bondarchuk's first feature-length film, it was workshopped and developed at the International Documentary Film Festival Amsterdam IDFAcademy and the Dok.incubator program.

The film won the IDFA Special Jury Award and the Docs Against Gravity Mayor of Gdynia Award, and was chosen by the Ukrainian Association of Cinematographers as the best domestic non-fiction film of 2016. It ranked 56th on the Ukraine film archives' list of the best films of Ukrainian cinema, and was Ukraine's official selection for foreign-language film at the US 89th Academy Awards.

== Context ==
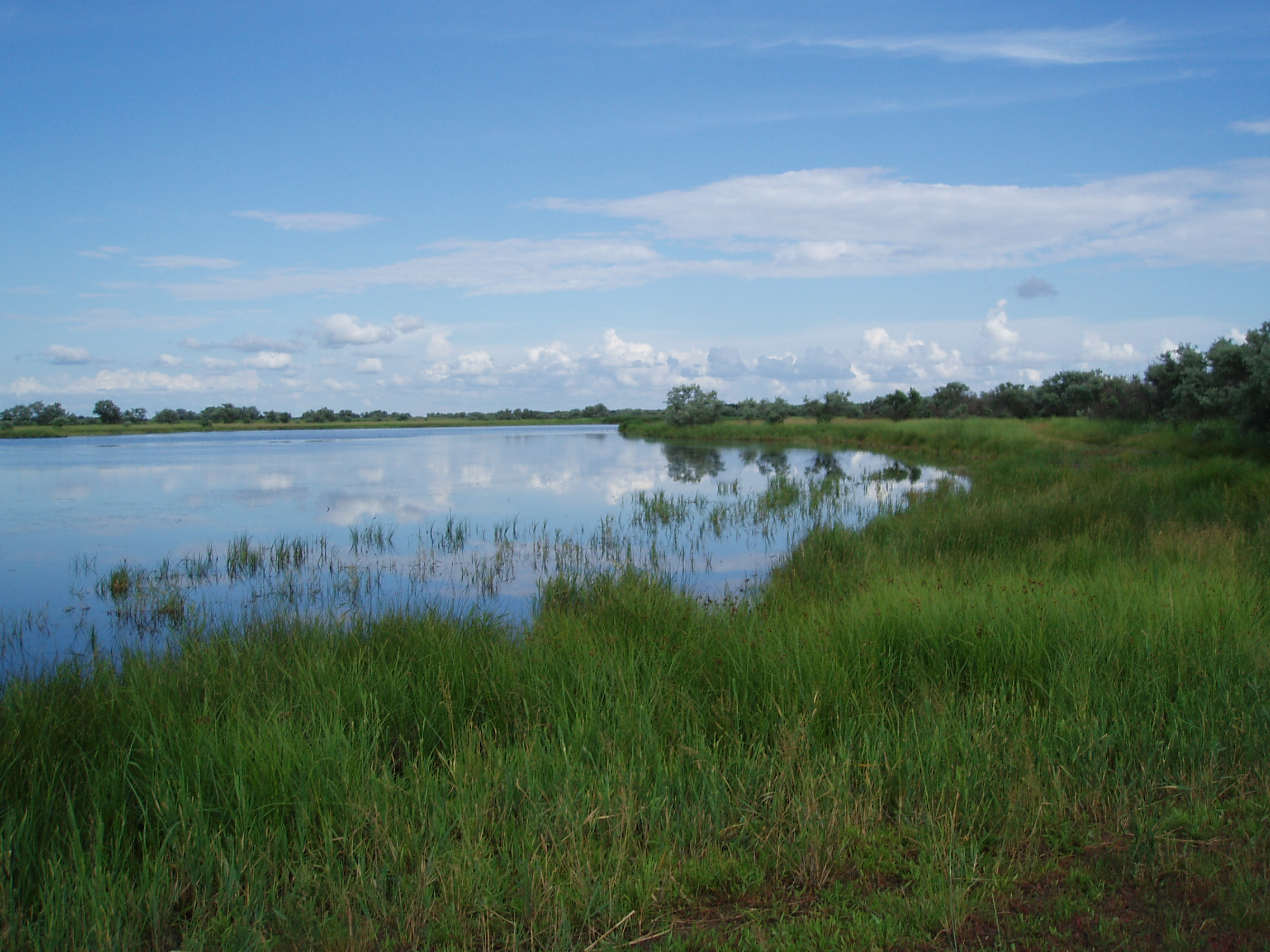
Zburivskyi Kut, a shallow delta lake on which the village is located

Stara Zburyivka is a Ukrainian agricultural village in the hinterland of Kherson Oblast. It is located about 70 kilometres (43 mi) north of Crimea, at the south-eastern corner of the Dnieper–Bug estuary of the Black Sea, surrounded by wetlands and protected forests. In relative isolation, the villagers are used to doing things for themselves without government assistance. During filming, the village had a population of approximately 1800 with various ethnic groups. It once had a Zaporozhian Cossack settlement. The village has a mix of small, well-kept farmhouses and barns, and dilapidated shacks with overgrown and neglected yards.

Until 2015, Ukraine had a single, nation-wide law-enforcement organization called the militsiya. The organization was founded during the Soviet era and was directly involved in Soviet political repressions throughout Ukraine. The system changed little following independence, and it continued to use Soviet-era procedures written in Moscow, with a reputation as the largest, most bureaucratic, and most corrupt police force in Europe. Bribes were required to gain employment or promotion and for many police interactions, and theft of property from crime scenes was common. The militsiya generally did not involve itself with outlying villages.

The militsiya made a rare visit to Stara Zburivka during a land dispute (Note: Eugenia Oliynyk of Radio Liberty reported that Marunyak's arrest by the militsiya came after he was trying to prevent land theft in the village. There are no further details in available sources.) and arrested village council chairman (mayor) Viktor Marunyak without evidence. The village residents rallied to defend him and secure his release. To prevent further conflicts with the militsiya and attend to the community's need for policing, Marunyak conceived the idea of village sheriffs. Residents Victor Kryvoborodko and Volodya Rudkovsky were elected by their fellow villagers (Note: Kryvoborodko and Rudkovsky were initially appointed as sheriffs by mayor Marunyak, and later confirmed in this role in a village election.) as public assistants to the militsiya precinct inspector, combining the roles of policemen and social workers, to de-escalate and settle conflicts before matters became criminal.

In 2015, following the Maidan Revolution, the militsiya was disbanded and replaced with the National Police of Ukraine. By September 2015, the Interior Ministry had officially launched its own Ukrainian Sheriffs program, replacing district militsiya officers with newly trained police officers, instructed to develop relationships with every family in the villages and small towns of their districts.

== Featured subjects ==
The film chronicles life in Stara Zburivka between the summers of 2013 and 2014, with the concluding scenes occurring in May 2015. Director Roman Bondarchuk stated that the villagers initially avoided the cameras, but later competed for the film crew's attention. The film focuses on five villagers:

- Viktor Vasylyovych Marunyak (born 21 March 1962) was the chairman of the Stara Zburivka village council, referred to in some sources as its mayor. He was elected to the position in 2006 and re-elected four times. He is a former history teacher.
- Viktor Grygorovych Kryvoborodko was a village sheriff and pensioner. He aspired to a military career in the Soviet era and later became a militsya officer until he retired to his home village due to health issues. He is middle-aged in the film. (Note: The filmmakers state that Kryvoborodko was 50 years old and Rudkovsky was 44 years old, though it is unclear when this applied in the film's multi-year narrative.)
- Volodymyr Rudkovsky was a village sheriff and former member of the militsya who had been primarily occupied with guard duties. He later worked as a nightclub bouncer. Following the birth of his daughter, he settled into a family life in the village and raised pigs on a small plot of land. He is middle-aged in the film.
- Mykola "Kolya" Yanovskyy was an unemployed habitual petty criminal who performed community service in the village. He was unpopular due to his habits of eating the neighbourhood dogs and making alcohol, but aspired to be accepted and respected. In the film, he stated that all of his cousins had been in prison, and that his brother was sent to prison for the murder of their father.
- Serhiy Lazarevych was a pro-Russian separatist whose vocal advocacy threatened to divide the village. He called for the villagers to create a "community of people" independent of any government and espoused Russian World ideology. (Note: Serhiy promotes a revisionist history of an empire of 140 nationalities under Russia, from the Great Wall of China to the North Sea, living prosperously. It is an amalgamation of the Norse Rus' people, Kyivan Rus', and civilizations of Tartary as described by 17th-century Europeans whose vague and ignorant descriptions allowed these to be easily adapted in Russian conspiracy theories of a lost civilization.)

Years after the filming, during the Russian occupation of Kherson Oblast, Marunyak was taken prisoner by Russian special forces (Spetsnaz GRU) on 21 March 2022. (Note: Marunyak was an outspoken advocate for peace and democracy, held pro-Ukrainian rallies and hid activists in his home. He was one of more than fifty local leaders who were detained by the Russian military in an attempt to subdue the occupied territories in 2022.) They destroyed his house and refused to bring his medication for a chronic illness. After 23 days of captivity, Marunyak was released with pneumonia and nine broken ribs, which he told the Associated Press were due to water torture and beatings. Marunyak was hospitalized for ten days before escaping to Ukrainian-controlled territory. Marunyak and his wife Katia were brought out of Russian-occupied territory by humanitarian workers, and moved to exile in Latvia where they stayed with the family of one of the filmmakers. Marunyak's experiences are the subject of the short documentary The Lost Paradise. Viktor Marunyak (2022).

Shortly after the end of filming, Kryvoborodko and Rudkovsky were elected deputies of the village council. In May 2022, Marunyak stated that of the two sheriffs, one had joined the Ukrainian army and was fighting on the eastern front while the other was hiding in Russian-occupied territory.

== Synopsis ==
The documentary opens in summer 2013 with Rudkovsky chopping firewood. He steadies wood with one hand while swinging the axe, facing away to avoid wood chips. The kindling is then lit in a small stove to make coffee. Kryvoborodko receives an alert and the two sheriffs abandon the coffee. Rudkovsky starts their decrepit 40-year-old Lada sedan and drives them down the dirt road. Kryvoborodko opens the window to finish his cigarette and accidentally dislodges the small Ukrainian flag which had distinguished it as an official car.

The sheriffs settle a dispute by hiring a handyman to repair property damage, allowing a homeless man to leave the village. Other vagrants have decided to stay in the village, and the sheriffs have attempted to settle them in abandoned, sometimes ramshackle buildings. The sheriffs explain that while not inherently bad, these people do drink and congregate in increasingly crowded and squalid conditions. An elderly resident accuses one such person of being perpetually drunk, operating a tavern and brothel, and putting a snake in her firewood shed.

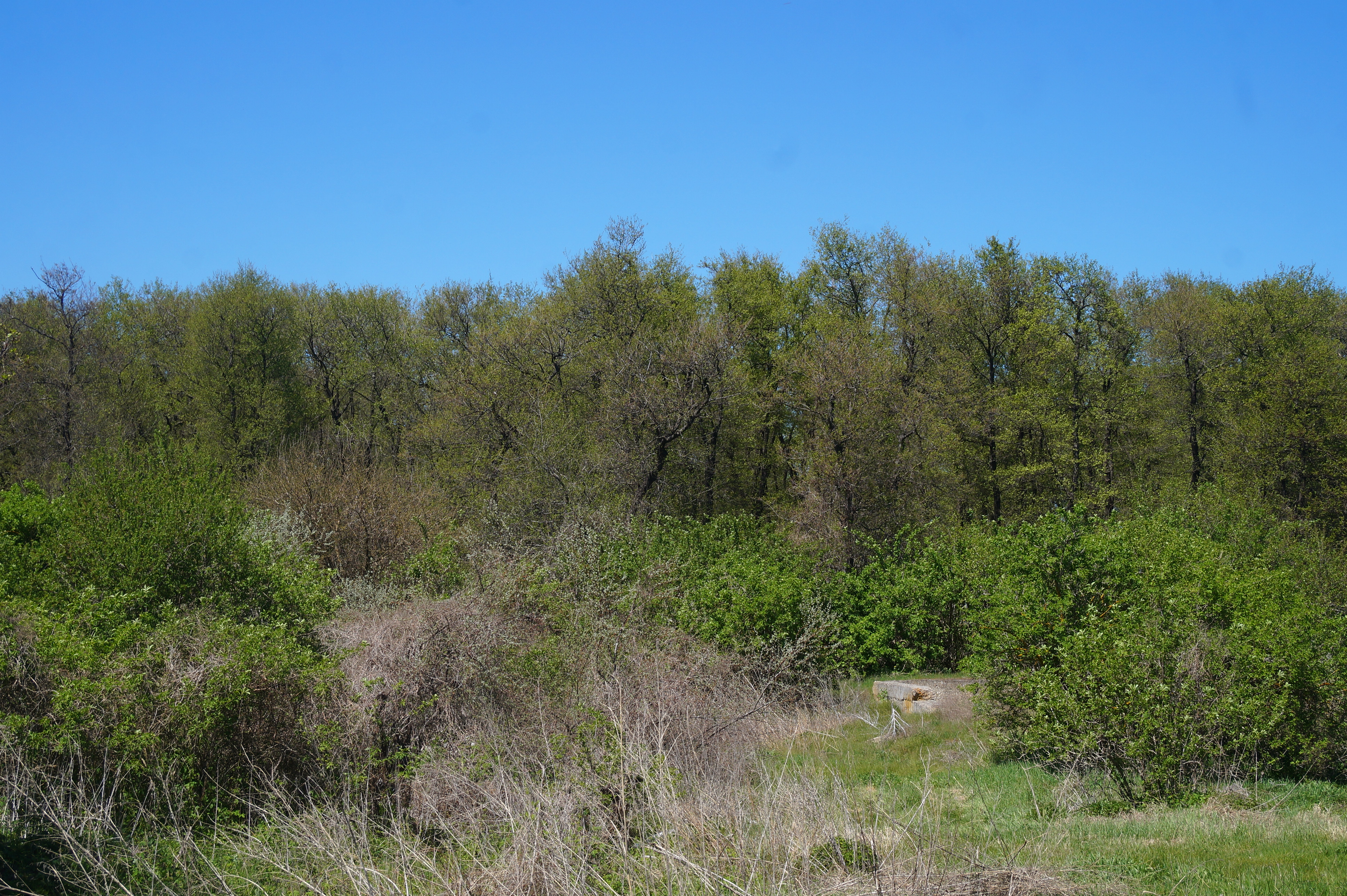
Stara Zburivka Acacia Forest, a protected area south-east of the village

The sheriffs check on Kolya and Vova, two petty criminals who are trying to turn their lives around, making sure that they are keeping out of trouble, that they can keep their phones charged, and assisting with their probation documents. After cleaning garbage in a park, Kolya and Vova carry a log to their home as they lack firewood.

Mayor Marunyak meets with Kolya, who explains his ambitions to be respected and accepted, to have his own home, garden and family. He promises not to eat the neighbourhood dogs as he had in the past, believing it a preventative for tuberculosis. Marunyak later decides to transfer Kolya's deceased brother's house to him. Following the official transfer, Kolya begins tidying the overgrown yard of weeds and refuse, while a neighbour loudly complains of an alcoholic wife-beating thief moving in.

At a village council meeting during the winter, a young man named Serhiy unveils his organization which seeks to form an independent community, politically separated from Ukraine, issuing human passports, and withholding taxes from the government. Serhiy espouses Russian World ideology and revisionist history. Serhiy later addresses a gathering at the village club and is shouted down and ridiculed by the villagers. The mayor accuses him of trying to divide the villagers. Marunyak invites Serhiy to stand for election but leaves the meeting, tired of his antics.

Meanwhile, there are news reports of the Russian annexation of Crimea. A man perches in a precarious watchtower, (Note: The watchtower is pictured on the film poster, see infobox.) listening to distant military transmissions on a small transistor radio. The War in Donbas begins and Serhiy is shown flying a powered paraglider around the watchtower, his purpose unstated.

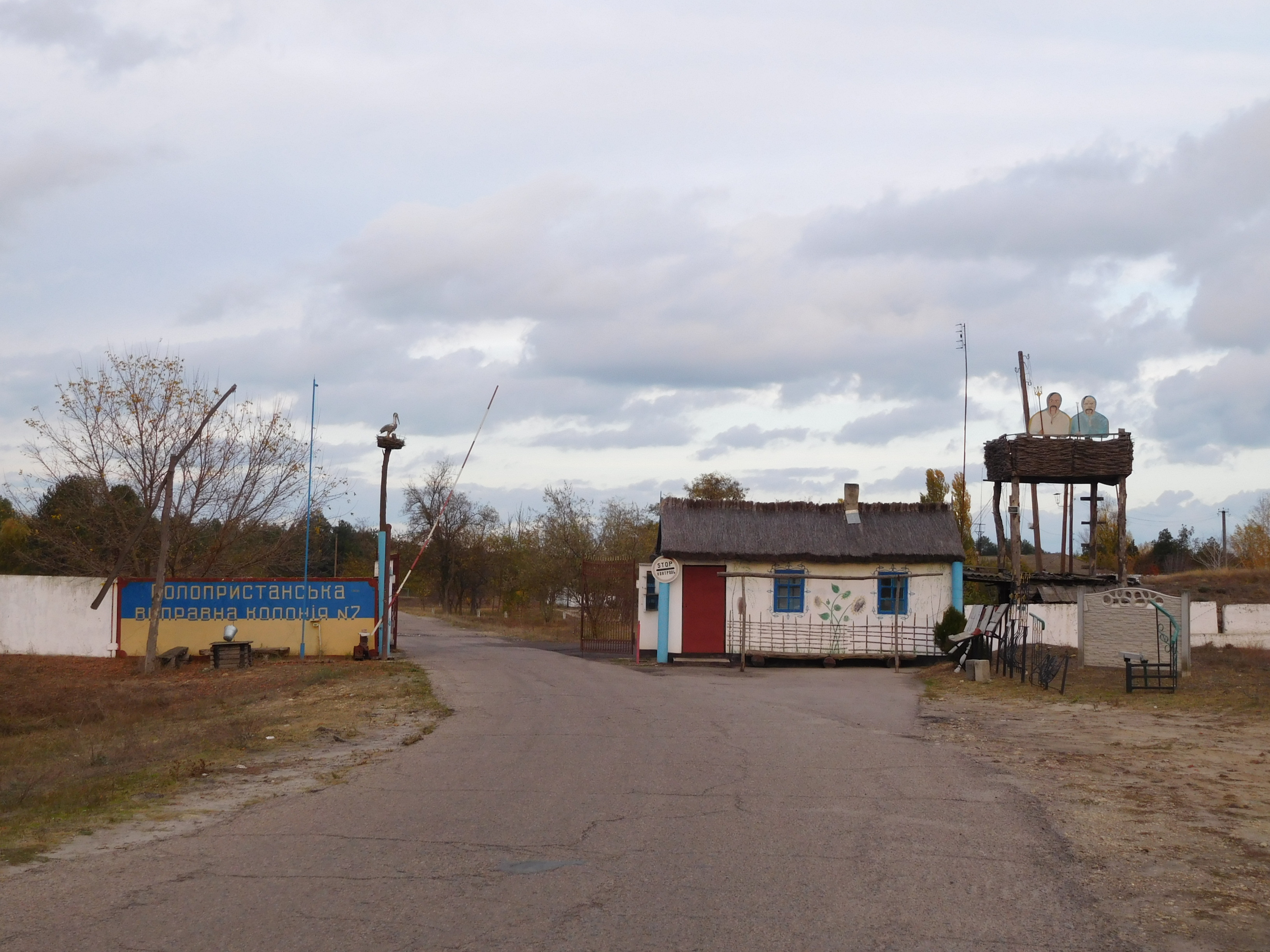
A makeshift barricade and checkpoint at the village boundary, pictured in 2017, where villagers stopped and inspected vehicles with Crimean licence plates.

The mood in the village changes with the seriousness of the war. The sheriffs have to deliver registration notices for the military draft, which is met with some resistance. Rudkovsky is concerned that he might be on the draft list despite a shoulder injury. While many say that they will fight if the enemy comes from Crimea, most don't want to be sent to fight in Donbas and one man plans to emigrate to Germany. There is excitement when a military convoy passes through the village; Kryvoborodko has his young son Nikita pose for pictures in fatigues with an assault rifle. When the sheriffs deliver a draft notice to Serhiy's home, they discover that he has fled the village. The sheriffs find the recipient of another draft notice dead in his home; suspecting foul play, they call the militsiya to begin a criminal investigation.

The filmmakers return to the village one year later, in 2015, after Kryvoborodko had reported Kolya for stealing a bicycle; Kolya received a 3.5 year prison sentence. The sheriffs both have misgivings: Rudkovsky thinks they could have handled it themselves, and Kryvoborodko believes that prison never made anyone a better person. They're uncertain what should be done with Kolya's wife Tanya, who can only perform simple tasks and may not be able to support herself. She reads a letter from Kolya and speaks to his better qualities.

After much preparation, the village holds its 9 May victory celebrations. (Note: The Soviet republics commemorated Soviet victory over Nazi Germany on 9 May as Victory Day. In 2015, Ukraine changed its observance to Victory Day over Nazism in World War II, which was later moved to 8 May as Day of Remembrance and Victory over Nazism in World War II 1939 – 1945 with 9 May observed as Europe Day alongside the European Union.) The mayor speaks of the new war with the new enemy, and the need for those drafted to serve in the military, as a half-dozen villagers have already done. Vova is seen wearing fatigues, suggesting that he has achieved an official position in public service.

== Themes ==
According to Daryna Averchenko, who was the film's screenwriter, Ukrainian Sheriffs is a story about how people organized themselves to deal with a societal need – policing – without waiting for higher authority to provide instructions.

Sociologist Christina Jarymowycz found the film to have themes similar to that of the Maidan: distrust toward state institutions and a desire to take matters into one's own hands. Kryvoborodko and Rudkovsky contrast with cold and often corrupt bureaucrats. They act as a buffer, trying to resolve issues before involving the militsiya, and become an effective alternative to state structures that offer little empathy or reliability.

The film repeatedly returns to Kolya, described by film critic Neil Young as a "hapless, chaotic chap who seems to have wandered in from a previous century". According to Anna Yakutenko, Kolya is introduced as a vagrant and a drunken wife-beater, and gradually undergoes a character transformation, "from a villain into a victim of unfortunate circumstances." Although Kolya is shown to apply himself and use his own strengths to better his living conditions, he is ultimately imprisoned. In contrast, Kolya's community service partner Vova is seen wearing fatigues at the Victory Day celebration, which Jarymowycz believes is an indication that he, at least, has redeemed himself in the community.

Another theme is the effect of the conflict on everyday life. As the villagers prepare for Victory Day, their memories of past wars become recontextualized in the building conflict.

== Production ==
Ukrainian Sheriffs was produced by Daryna Averchenko for DocuDays South (Ukraine), and co-produced by Uldis Cekulis for VFS Films (Latvia), Irena Taskovski for Taskovski Films (Germany), and Tania Georgieva for German television. Six European TV channels were involved in the production, and the film also received support from the International Documentary Film Festival Amsterdam (IDFA) Bertha Fund (Eastern Europe). It was directed by filmmaker Roman Bondarchuk, who also served as cinematographer and co-editor.

Most of the film was shot from summer 2013 to summer 2014, which covered the period of the Maidan Revolution, the annexation of Crimea, and the beginning of the War in Donbas. From the extended shoots, nearly 200 hours of footage covered the sheriffs' investigations, duties, and daily lives. This was initially edited into small episodes with a first cut that was five hours in length and remained over two hours in length until its sixth cut. A preliminary version of the film was workshopped and developed with the guidance of expert documentary creators at the IDFAcademy Summer School in 2014. With additional funding, the crew returned to the village in May 2015 to record reactions to Kolya's arrest and imprisonment, and the 70th anniversary Victory Day celebration, which concludes the film. A rough cut of the film was then developed through the dok.incubator program in 2015.

A final cut of 88 minutes was assembled by Bondarchuk and co-editor Kateryna Gornostai, with sound by Borys Peter and original music by Anton Baibakov. A 52-minute edit was made for television. Dialogue is in Russian and Ukrainian.

== Release ==
The film premiered at the International Documentary Film Festival Amsterdam (IDFA), and was shown in special programs and in competition at more than three dozen other international film festivals. Its domestic premiere was at the DocuDays UA International Human Rights Documentary Film Festival on 26 March 2016 when it was screened in seven Ukrainian cities: Kyiv, Kharkiv, Dnipro, Lviv, Mariupol, Odessa and Kherson. Its Asian premiere was at the DMZ International Documentary Film Festival (South Korea) in September 2016.

Ukrainian Sheriffs received distribution support from the IDFA Bertha Fund, and was released throughout Ukraine in July 2016, then to the Baltic and Balkan regions in September. The film's television premiere took place on 1 April 2016 on the Franco-German channel Arte.

== Reception ==
Ukrainian film critic Sergey Trimbach, writing for The Day, praised Ukrainian Sheriffs and described Marunyak, Kryvoborodko, and Rudkovsky as role models for Ukraine. He compared the latter two to popular archetypes of American police officers with their weathered masculine looks, confident strength and sense of humour. He concluded that the film is about taking initiative to better one's life rather than waiting on the outcome of disputes between greater powers Anna Yakutenko wrote for Kyiv Post that the film portrays rural lives "in a semi-comic way [yet] sincere and heartwarming" but felt that it did not go far enough into examining attitudes toward the war and that the ending was too abrupt. Neil Young, in The Hollywood Reporter, described Ukrainian Sheriffs as "an episodic, wryly amusing affair, displaying considerable interest in and sympathy with human foibles." Fionnuala Halligan, chief film critic at Screen Daily, also praised the film and predicted that it would do well at international film festivals, but found that the subtitles left parts of the story unclear.

Jarymowycz wrote that the film "artfully evokes both difficult truths and moments of hope in everyday lives of Ukrainians" but felt that its narrative simplified and idealized the village, rather than challenging the audience with its rougher complexities.

=== Accolades ===
The film won the International Documentary Film Festival Amsterdam's (IDFA's) 2015 Special Jury Award. It also won the Mayor of Gdynia Award at the Docs Against Gravity Festival in Poland. The Ukrainian Association of Cinematographers (NSU) named Ukrainian Sheriffs the Best Ukrainian Non-Fiction Film of 2016 at the 2017 NSU awards ceremony.

The NSU put Ukrainian Sheriffs on a shortlist of submissions for the Best Foreign Language Film category of the American 89th Academy Awards, along with The Nest of the Turtledove and Song of Songs. Ukrainian Sheriffs was later chosen as Ukraine's official submission for the category.

In 2021, Ukraine's National Oleksandr Dovzhenko Film Centre compiled a list of the best 100 films in Ukrainian cinema through a survey of Ukrainian film critics, film experts and festival curators. Ukrainian Sheriffs ranked at position 56 on the list.

== See also ==
- List of submissions to the 89th Academy Awards for Best Foreign Language Film
- List of Ukrainian submissions for the Academy Award for Best Foreign Language Film
