= Olena Fetisova =

Ukrainian film producer

Olena Fetisova is the European Documentary Network and Ukrainian Association of Cinematographers member, 2009 Ukrainian State Film Award Winner, 2009 EAVE Graduate. Olena was born in Kyiv, Ukraine to a family of filmmakers, in 1964. Still lives in Kyiv.

== Career ==
She graduated from the Moscow Film School VGIK, 1987. She has been working in the film industry without interruption ever since. In 2001, she founded the Interfilm Production Studio. Fetisova refused the State Award of Armenia in 2014 in protest of Armenian recognition of the “referendum” in Crimea.

In 2013, she was director, screenwriter and producer in Paradjanov.

In 2019, Fetisova participated in the Trans-Atlantic Partners, a joint initiative between Germany’s Erich Pommer Institute, the Canadian Media Producers Association, Telefilm Canada and the Canada Media Fund.

== Filmography ==
Year	Title	Original Title	Genre	Length	Role	Notes
2002	Blue Moon	Голубая луна	Feature	90’	Line Producer (Ukraine)	Grand Prix at Diagonale FF, Austria, 2003; Variety Critic's Choice of Europe's 10 Best Films, Karlovy Vary IFF, 2003
2004	Love is…	Любовь это...	Shorts	26’ (x12)	Producer	
2004	If I Were a Saxophone	Вероника и саксофон	Documentary	52’	Director/Writer/Producer	Official Selection MOFFOM IFF, Czech Republic, 2006; Official Selection “Mediawave” IFF, Hungary, 2005; Official Selection Parnu IFF, Estonia, 2005
2004	Cinemania	Киномания	Documentary	55’	Producer	First Prize of the Festival «Vidkryta nich», Kyiv, Ukraine, 2004; Special Prize of the Film Festival «To Love a Cinema», Moscow, Russia, 2004; Diploma of the International Docs Festival «Contact», Kyiv, Ukraine, 2005; Nominated for the National award «Teletriumph» in 2005
2005	Roots	Русские корни, или Однажды в Оренбурге	Documentary	52’	Director/Writer/Producer	Official Selection 34th Kyiv IFF “Molodist”, Ukraine
2005	Our Avalon	Наш Авалон	Documentary	30’	Producer	
2006	There Was a Woman Who Lived in a Shoe	Стояла себе хатка	Documentary	30’	Director/Writer/Producer	Grand Prix at III TV Festival “Open Ukraine”; First Prize at II IFF “Time-To-Live”, Russia; Silver Knight Prize at XV “Golden Knight” IFF, Russia
2006	4-th Chair. The Art of How To End a War	4-й Стул. Искусство Окончания Войны	Documentary	56’	Line Producer (Ukraine)	
2007	Wishes Coming True	Исполнение желаний	Short	23’	Producer	
2008	Extraordinary Chernomyrdi	Чрезвычайный Черномырдин	Documentary	44’	Director/Writer/Producer	Official Selection 38th Kyiv IFF “Molodist”, Ukraine
2008	An Awesome Tale	Прикольна казка	Feature	88’	Producer	2009 Ukrainian State Film Award for the Best Children’s Film; Grand Prix at X “Art Amphora” Balkans Festival for Films and Television Programs for Children and Youth, Bulgaria, 2009; Official Selection 10th China International Children’s FF, 2009; Official Selection 13th Tallinn Black Nights Film Festival, Children and Youth Film Festival Just Film, Estonia, 2009; The Prize “For the Best Film” at XIII “Golden Chicken” IFF, Ukraine, 2009; Prizes for Best Fascinating Film and for Best Girl’s Character at XVI International Children’s FF “ARTEK”, Ukraine, 2008; Special Prize at IV Sebastopol's IFF, Ukraine, 2008; Special Jury's Mention and Diploma "For Artistic and Professional Implementation in Genre Film" at VIII International Producer's Film Festival "KinoYalta", Ukraine, 2008; Best Film for Children Award at the First IFF “Wings”, Ukraine, 2009; Best Foreign Film for Children Award at III Open “TVPro” Festival, Russia, 2009; Opening FILM of the Ukrainian Film Festival, Dublin, Ireland, 2008; Screenings at the Ukrainian Film Festival, Montreal-Saskatoon-Regina, Canada, 2008; Special screening at the Baltic Event Forum, Tallinn, Estonia, December 2008
2009	Not Alone at Home	Не один дома	Documentary	52’	Director/Writer/Producer	Official Selection 5th Monterrey IFF, Mexico; Silver Knight Prize at XVIII “Golden Knight” IFF, Russia; Audience Award at XX Open DFF “Russia”; Special Mention at 39th Kyiv IFF “Molodist”, Ukraine; Official Selection 6th “Golden Apricot” IFF, Armenia
2010	Pit # 8	Шахта №8	Documentary Feature	90’	Producer	Official Selection 14th Tallinn Black Nights Film Festival, Special Mention, 2010; Official Selection Crossing Europe Film Festival, Austria, 2011; Official Selection Cape Winelands Film Festival, South Africa, 2011; Official Selection One World Romanian Doc Film Festival, 2011; Official Selection Нot Docs Canadian International Documentary Film Festival, 2011; Official Selection Full Frame Documentary Film Festival, USA, 2011; ZAGREBDOX International Documentary Film Festival, Croatia, Special Mention by the Jury "Movies that matter", 2011
2013	Paradjanov	Параджанов	Feature	100’	Director/Writer/Producer	developed at EAVE 2009
