= Oles Ulianenko =

Ukrainian writer (1962–2010)

- Олександр Станіславович Ульянов
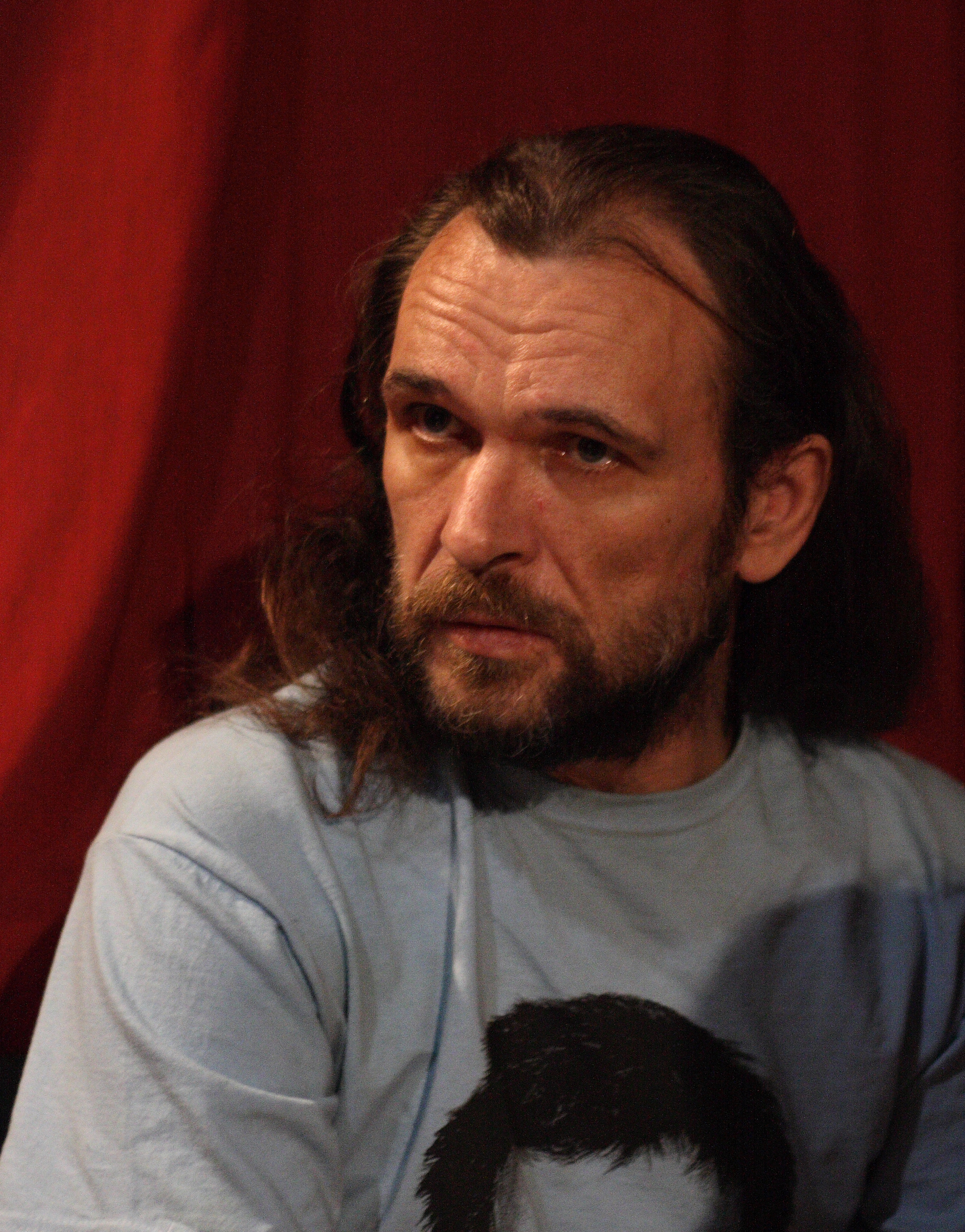
- Born: Oleksandr Stanislavovych Ulianov; 14 August 1962; Khorol, Poltava Oblast, Ukrainian SSR, Soviet Union
- Died: 17 August 2010 (aged 48); Kyiv, Ukraine
- Resting place: Baikove Cemetery, Kyiv
- Education: Lubny Medical Institute; Mykolaiv Nautical School (1980)
- Occupation: Writer
- Writing career
- Pen name: Oles Ulianenko
- Language: Ukrainian
- Notable work: Stalinka
- Military career
- Branch: Soviet Air Forces
- Service years: 1980s

Oleksandr Stanislavovych Ulianov (Ukrainian: Олександр Станіславович Ульянов; 14 August (officially 8 May), 1962 – 17 August 2010) was a Ukrainian writer known by the pen name Oles Ulianenko (Оле́сь Улья́ненко, pronounced [oˈlɛsʲ ʊlʲˈjanɛnko]). He was the youngest winner of the Shevchenko National Prize, which he received in 1997, at the age of 35, for his novel Stalinka (1994).

He also won awards from the magazines Suchasnist and Blahovist.

== Personal life ==
Ulianenko graduated from Mykolaiv Nautical School and served in the Soviet Air Forces in East Germany and Afghanistan. While living in Leningrad, he became acquainted with local rock music, learned to play the guitar and tried to form a band. He was married for seven years before getting divorced.

== Career ==
At various points, Ulianenko's work was censored by the Ukrainian government for its explicit content. In 2009, for example, Ukraine's National Television and Broadcasting Council, on the recommendation of the National Expert Commission of Ukraine on the Protection of Public Morality, blocked the publication of his novel Жінка його мрії ("The Woman of His Dreams").

Ulianenko's last work published during his lifetime was a criminal melodrama called Там, де Південь ("Where the South Is"), released in December 1999. In 2000, he wrote the screenplay for the film Украдене Щастя ("Stolen Happiness") with the director Andrii Donchyk, based on a play of the same name by Ivan Franko. The fourth part of the film was released in 2004.

The book Oles Ulianenko: Without Censorship was released on 15 August 2010, to mark Ulianenko's 48th birthday. It includes approximately 40 interviews with him conducted by multiple publications and television channels from 1994 to 2010. It also includes a detailed description and documents from Ulianenko's lawsuit against the National Expert Commission of Ukraine on the Protection of Public Morality, prepared by his lawyer, Oleh Veremiienko.

Ulianenko died on 17 August 2010, in his apartment in Kyiv under unclear circumstances. He was buried in the Baikove Cemetery (Section 33) in Kyiv.

In April 2013, a revised edition of The Woman of His Dreams was published.

== Bibliography ==
=== Novels ===
- Stalinka (1994)
- Winter's Tale (1995)
- Fire Eye (1997)
- Bohemian Rhapsody (1999)
- Son of the Shadow (2001)
- Dauphin of Satan (2003)
- Sign of Savoofa (2003)
- Flowers of Sodom (2005)
- Serafima (2007)
- The Woman of His Dreams (2010)
- Prorok (2013)

=== Short stories ===
- "Siedoi" (2003)
- "Where the South Is" (2010)

=== Trilogies ===
- Angels of Revenge (2012)
