= Iryna Sanina =

Ukrainian footballer (born 1985)

Personal information
- Full name: Iryna Fedorivna Sanina
- Birth name: Iryna Fedorivna Kataeva
- Date of birth: 8 October 1985 (age 41)
- Place of birth: Donetsk, Soviet Union
- Position: Goalkeeper

Team information
- Current team: Heniu

Senior career*
Years	Team	Apps	(Gls)
1998–2005	WFC Donchanka	61	(4)
2007–2021	Zhytlobud-1 Kharkiv	15	(9)
2021–2022	Kolos Kovalivka		
2022–	Heniu		

International career
2013–2022	Ukraine	17	(0)
- * Club domestic league appearances and goals

Iryna Fedorivna Sanina (Ukrainian: Ірина Федорівна Саніна, née Kataeva, born 8 October 1985) is a Ukrainian footballer who plays as a goalkeeper for Romanian club ACS Heniu Prundu Bârgăului and the Ukraine women's national team.

On 23 September 2022 she announced of her retirement from the national team. She made her first appearance for team back in 2013 but has been called up as early as 2003. In total Sanina recorded 17 official matches for the Ukraine national team.
