= Mamay (film) =

2003 film

- Ukrainian: Мамай
- Directed by: Oles Sanin
- Produced by: Maksym Asadchyi; Anna Chmil; Aram Gevorkyan
- Starring: Viktoria Spesivtseva; Andriy Bilous; Nazl Sejtablaeva; Serhiy Romaniuk; Oles Sanin; Akhtem Seitablaev; Eldar Akimov; Emil Rasilov
- Cinematography: Serhiy Mykhalchuk
- Edited by: Andriy Sanin
- Release date: 2003
- Running time: 80 minutes
- Country: Ukraine
- Language: Ukrainian

Mamay (Ukrainian: «Мамай») is a 2003 Ukrainian language film. Based on ancient Ukrainian and Crimean Tatar folklore, it is a Ukrainian version of Romeo and Juliet. A fugitive Cossack falls in love with a stunningly beautiful Tatar woman who saves him from certain death. Their love defies age-old hatred between their respective peoples. The film features cinematography by Serhiy Mykhalchuk and a soundtrack by composer Alla Zahaikevych. It was directed by Oles Sanin. Mamay was Ukraine's 2003 submission for an Academy Award for Best Foreign Language Film.

== Plot ==
Created on the basis of ancient Ukrainian and Crimean Tatar folklore. This is the Ukrainian version of Romeo and Juliet. A fugitive Cossack falls in love with a stunningly beautiful Tatar woman who saves him from imminent death.

Director Sanin wrote about the combination of three stories in the film: two epic Crimean Tatar and one invented by him — how a Tatar woman finds the youngest dying Cossack in the steppe. Brings him home, treats; falls in love with him, becomes his wife.

== Cast ==
- Viktoria Spesivtseva as Tatar Woman
- Andrij Bilous as Mamay
- Nazl Sejtablaeva as Little Tatar Girl
- Sergey Romanyuk as Eldest Brother
- Oles Sanin as Middle Brother
- Akhtem Seitablaev as Tatar Warrior
- Eldar Akimov as Tatar Warrior
- Emil Rasilov as Tatar Warrior

== Production costs ==
The film's budget amounted to 280 thousand dollars (₴10,298,738).

== Production ==
The shooting lasted only 24 days. On the eve of the premiere, an agreement was signed with Golden Gate Film to distribute the film in Western film markets. This was the first such case for Ukrainian cinema. Many years later, Sanin stated that Mamay was an "experiment," his thesis, which was supposed to be seen by a very narrow circle of viewers.

== See also ==
- List of submissions to the 76th Academy Awards for Best Foreign Language Film
- List of Ukrainian submissions for the Academy Award for Best International Feature Film
