= Nariman Aliev =

Ukrainian director and screenwriter

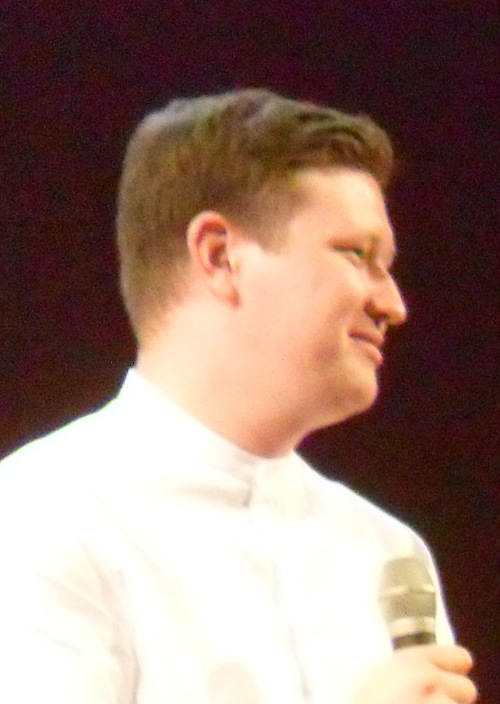
- Born: 15 December 1992 (age 33); Petrivka, Crimea, Ukraine
- Citizenship: Ukraine
- Occupation: Film director
- Years active: 2013 - now
- Organization: European Film Academy

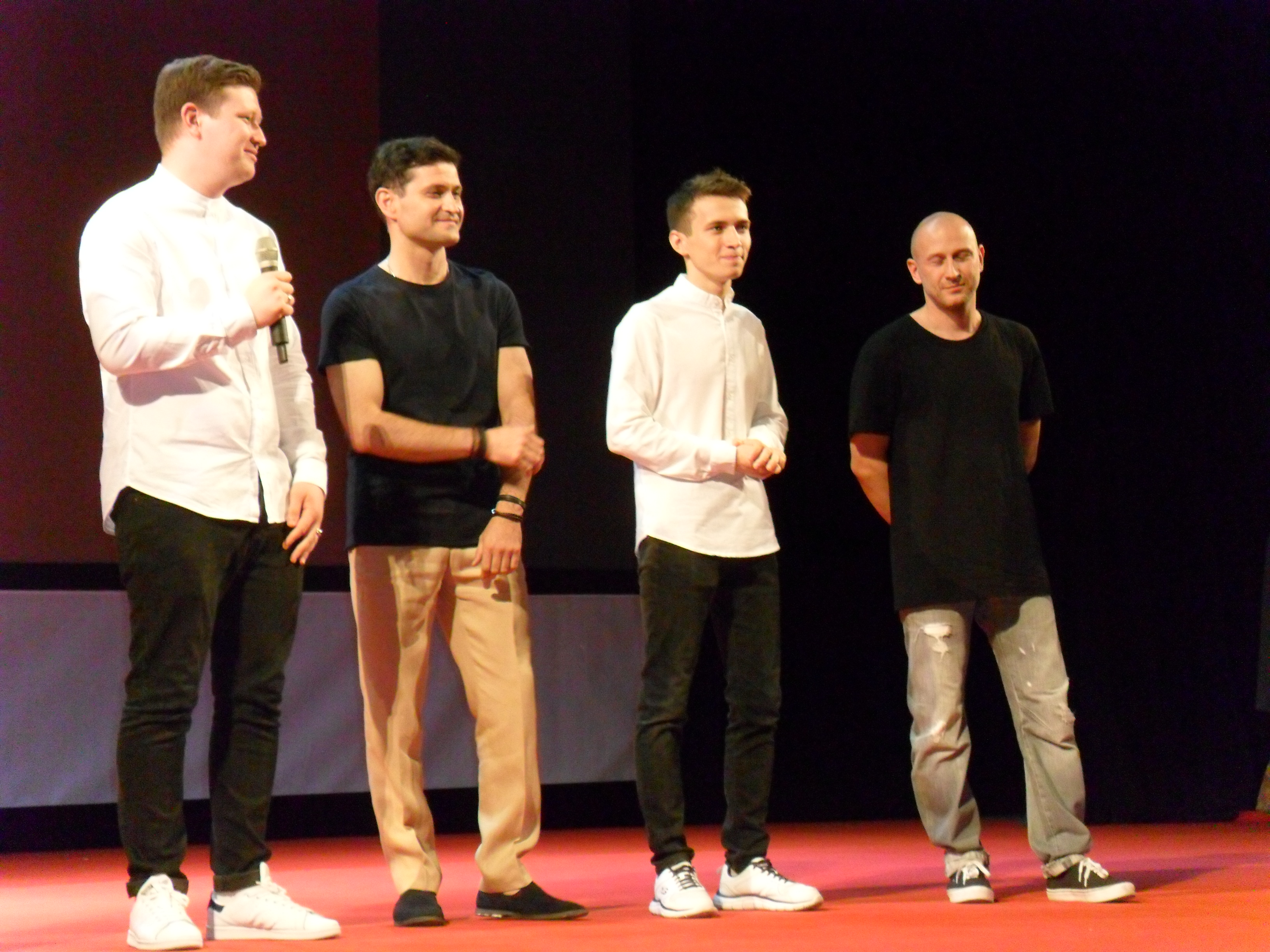
Nariman Aliev stands first on the left

Nariman Ridvanovych Aliev (Ukrainian: Наріман Рідьванович Алієв, Crimean Tatar: Nariman Ridvan oğlu Aliyev) (born 15 December 1992) is a Ukrainian director and screenwriter of Crimean Tatar origin. Winner of The National Film Critics Award "Kinokolo" 2019 (Best Director and Best Film).

Honored Artist of Ukraine (2020).

== Biography ==
Nariman Aliev was born on December 15, 1992, in the village of Petrivka, Krasnohvardiiske Raion, Autonomous Republic of Crimea.

In 2009 he graduated from Petrivska Secondary School of I-III grades No. 1.

In 2013, he received a bachelor's degree in television and film directing from the Institute of Screen Arts (Oleh Fialko's workshop).

In 2014 he received a diploma of a specialist in television directing from Kyiv National Ivan Karpenko-Karyi Theatre, Cinema and Television University.

In 2016, he was nominated for the Crystal Bear of the Berlin International Film Festival for his short film "Without You".

Member of the Ukrainian Film Academy since 2017.

Member of the European Film Academy since 2019.

Member of the Public Council of the Ukrainian Oscar Committee since 2019.

Nariman Aliev's debut feature film Homeward (2019) was screened in the Un Certain Regard section at the 72nd Cannes International Film Festival.

== Filmography ==
- 2013 — Back at Dawn (Crimean Tatar: Tan Atqanda Qaytmaq) — director, screenwriter, cameraman, editing, producer
- 2013 — Dima — operator, editing
- 2014 — I Love You (Crimean Tatar: Seni Sevem) — director, screenwriter, cameraman, editing, producer
- 2014 — Black (Azerbaijani: Qara) — installation
- 2014 — Son — operator
- 2016 — Without You (Crimean Tatar: Sensiz) — director, screenwriter, cameraman, editing, producer
- 2019 - Homeward (Crimean Tatar: Evge)— director, screenwriter
