= Oles Sanin =

Ukrainian actor and cinematographer (born 1972)

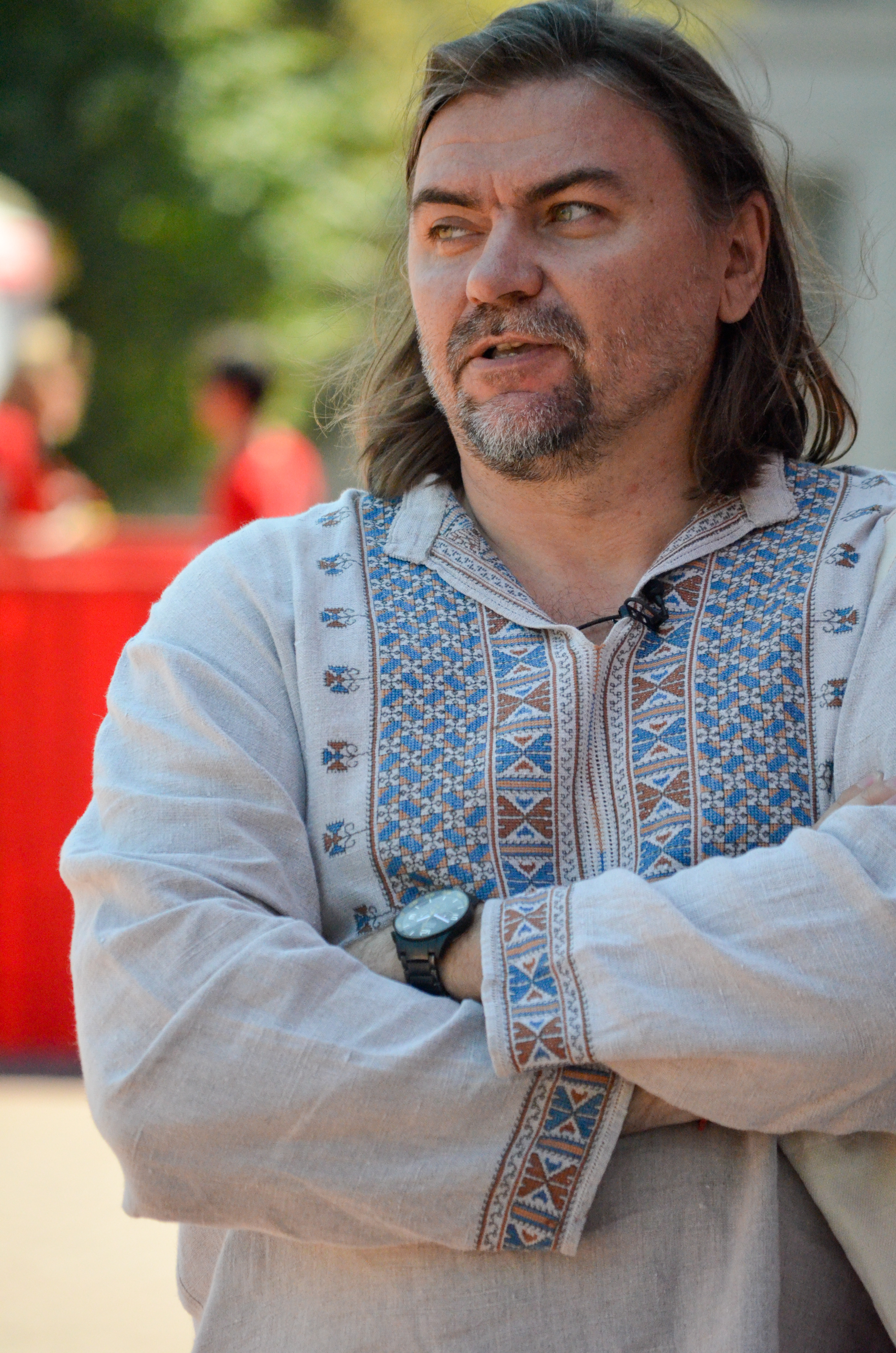
- Sanin at Odesa International Film Festival in 2014
- Born: July 30, 1972 (age 53); Kamin-Kashyrskyi, Ukraine, Soviet Union
- Occupations: Film director, producer, screenwriter
- Years active: 1994–present

Oles Hennadiyovych Sanin (Ukrainian: Олесь Геннадійович Санін; born July 30, 1972, in Kamin-Kashyrskyi) is a Ukrainian film director, actor, cinematographer, producer, musician and sculptor. An Honored Artist of Ukraine (2014); he was also awarded the Alexander Dovzhenko Ukrainian State Award.

== Biography ==
Born in Kamin-Kashyrskyi in the Volyn Oblast. He graduated of the Ivan Karpenko-Kary National University of Theatre, Film and TV in Kyiv in 1993 in the actor's class (tutor: Valentyna Zymniya) and finished the film directing course for feature films (tutor: Leonid Osyka) in 1998. He made his internships in the Netherlands and the United States. In the years 1994–2000 he worked as a film director, director of photography, director of the production in the feature and documentary films' section of the Ukrainian branch of the international organisation Internews Network (presently Internews). He produced several dozen documentaries (e.g. for such stations as Internews Network, Canal+, the Ukrainian TV channel 1+1, NTV, TNT, Polsat, DALAS studio, IKON, PRO Helvecia). He was the director of photography of several documentary films and directed a few documentary and feature short films.

Sanin presides over the Ukrainian Association of Young Cinematographers.

He plays the bandura, torban, hurdy-gurdy and follows the Volhynia tradition of hurdy-gurdy players.

He used to make musical instruments himself, mastering the craft of his grandfather. Using the pseudonym Oleś Smyk (Ukrainian: Олесь Смик), he is a member of the Kyiv Kobzar Gild.

Two of his feature films, the debut Mamay (2003) and The Guide (2014), were official Ukrainian entries for the Academy Award for Best Foreign Language Film.

The Guide about the fate of Ukrainian kobzars was premiered on October 10, 2014 at the 30th Warsaw Film Festival.

== Awards and honors ==
- Alexander Dovzhenko Ukrainian State Award for the film Mamay (Ukrainian: Мамай, 2003),
- Silver Medal of the Ukrainian Academy of Arts
- The Lumière Brothers' Silver Medal.

== Filmography ==
=== Feature films ===
- 1995 – Atentat – osinnie vbivstwo u Miunkheni (The Assassination – the Autumn Assassination in Munich) (actor)
- 2003 – Mamay (Ukrainian: Мамай) (film director, screenwriter, actor)
- 2012 – Match (The Match) (assistant director)
- 2013 – The Guide (Ukrainian: Поводир, або квіти мають очі, romanized: Powodyr, abo kwity majut' oczi, meaning The Guide or flowers have eyes) (film director, screenwriter)
- 2023 – Dovbush (Ukrainian: Довбуш) (director, producer, screenwriter)

=== Documentary films ===
- 1994 – Matinka Nadiya (Mother Nadia)
- 1994 – Buria (The Storm)
- 1995 – Zymno (Winter)
- 1996 – Pustyn' (Deserts)
- 1998 – Tanok morzha (The Danse of the Walrus) (co-authored)
- 1999 – Natsiya. Lemky (A Nation – Lemkos)
- 1999 – Natsiya. Yevreyi (A Nation – Jews)
- 1999 – Hrikh (Sin)
- 2000 – Rizdvo, abo iak Hutsuly kintsia svitu chekaly (Christmas or how the Hutsuls were awaiting the Doomsday)
- 2001 – Аkvarel' (The Watercolour)
- 2005 – Den' siomyi (The Seventh Day) (film director)
- 2008 – Perebyzhchyk (The Defector) (co-authored with Mark Jonathan Harris)
- 2017 – Perelomnyi moment: vijna za demokratiyu v Ukrayini (Breaking Point: The War for Democracy in Ukraine ) (co-authored with Mark Jonathan Harris)
