= List of nonlinear narrative films =

The following is a chronological list of nonlinear narrative films.

== 2020s ==
Year	Title	Director	Note
2026	The Social Reckoning	Aaron Sorkin	
2026	The Odyssey	Christopher Nolan	
2026	Project Hail Mary	Phil Lord; Christopher Miller	
2025	Back to the Past	Ng Yuen-fai, Jack Lai	overlapped plot with A Step into the Past
2025	Tere Ishk Mein	Aanand L. Rai	
2025	A House of Dynamite	Kathryn Bigelow	Netflix political thriller film
2025	Weapons	Zach Cregger	
2025	96 Minutes	Hung Tzu-hsuan	
2025	HIT: The Third Case	Sailesh Kolanu	
2025	Retro	Karthik Subbaraj	
2024	We Live in Time	John Crowley	
2024	Maharaja	Nithilan Saminathan	
2024	Deadpool & Wolverine	Shawn Levy	
2024	Challengers	Luca Guadagnino	
2024	Orion and the Dark	Sean Charmatz	
2024	Captain Miller	Arun Matheswaran	
2023	Salaar: Part 1 - Ceasefire	Prashanth Neel	
2023	Animal	Sandeep Reddy Vanga	
2023	Mark Antony	Adhik Ravichandran	
2023	Oppenheimer	Christopher Nolan	
2023	Guardians of the Galaxy Vol. 3	James Gunn	
2023	Beau Is Afraid	Ari Aster	
2023	Iratta	Rohit M. G. Krishnan	
2022	Glass Onion: A Knives Out Mystery	Rian Johnson	
2022	Cobra	R. Ajay Gnanamuthu	
2022	Thallumaala	Khalid Rahman	
2022	Sita Ramam	Hanu Raghavapudi	
2022	Iravin Nizhal	R. Parthiban	Single-Shot film
2022	Vikram	Lokesh Kanagaraj	
2022	Decision to Leave	Park Chan-wook	
2022	Don	Cibi Chakaravarthi	
2022	Mahaan	Karthik Subbaraj	
2021	The French Dispatch	Wes Anderson	
2021	Dawn Breaks Behind the Eyes	Kevin Kopacka	
2021	Last Night in Soho	Edgar Wright	
2021	Eternals	Chloé Zhao	
2021	F9	Justin Lin	
2021	Sardar Udham	Shoojit Sircar	Indian film
2021	Quarantine	Diana Ringo	Finnish-Russian film
2020	Shock Wave 2	Herman Yau	
2020	Mank	David Fincher	Netflix biographical drama film
2020	Friend of the World	Brian Patrick Butler	
2020	The Devil All the Time	Antonio Campos	Netflix psychological thriller film
2020	There Is No Evil	Mohammad Rasoulof	
2020	Oh My Kadavule	Ashwath Marimuthu	Dual narrative
2020	One Day We'll Talk About Today	Angga Dwimas Sasongko	Indonesian film

== 2010s ==
Year	Title	Director	Note
2019	Little Women	Greta Gerwig	
2019	Enai Noki Paayum Thota	Gautham Vasudev Menon	
2019	Knives Out	Rian Johnson	
2019	Kaithi	Lokesh Kanagaraj	
2019	El Camino: A Breaking Bad Movie	Vince Gilligan	Netflix film with limited theatrical release
2019	It Chapter Two	Andy Muschietti	
2019	Super Deluxe	Thiagarajan Kumararaja	Tamil movie
2019	Captain Marvel	Anna Boden and Ryan Fleck	
2018	KGF: Chapter 1	Prashanth Neel	
2018	Odiyan	V. A. Shrikumar Menon	
2018	Vada Chennai	Vetrimaaran	
2018	Bad Times at the El Royale	Drew Goddard	hyperlink cinema
2018	Mamma Mia! Here We Go Again	Ol Parker	
2018	You Were Never Really Here	Lynne Ramsay	
2017	Jigsaw	The Spierig Brothers	
2017	Arjun Reddy	Sandeep Reddy Vanga	
2017	Vikram Vedha	Pushkar–Gayathri	
2017	Dunkirk	Christopher Nolan	
2017	Merry-Go-Round	Ihor Podolchak	
2017	Maanagaram	Lokesh Kanagaraj	hyperlink cinema
2017	Have a Nice Day	Liu Jian	
2016	Arrival	Denis Villeneuve	
2016	Brimstone	Martin Koolhoven	
2016	Manchester by the Sea	Kenneth Lonergan	
2016	The Truth Beneath	Lee Kyoung-mi	
2016	The Handmaiden	Park Chan-wook	
2016	Jil Jung Juk	Deeraj Vaidy	
2016	Deadpool	Tim Miller	
2015	The Hateful Eight	Quentin Tarantino	
2015	Yagavarayinum Naa Kaakka	Sathya Prabhas Pinisetty	
2015	Too Late	Dennis Hauck	
2015	Steve Jobs	Danny Boyle	
2015	11 Minutes	Jerzy Skolimowski	
2015	Anegan	K. V. Anand	
2015	Yennai Arindhaal	Gautham Vasudev Menon	
2015	I	Shankar	
2014	The Last Five Years	Richard LaGravenese	
2014	Comet	Sam Esmail	
2014	The Imitation Game	Morten Tyldum	
2014	Gone Girl	David Fincher	
2014	Predestination	The Spierig Brothers	
2013	Oculus	Mike Flanagan	
2013	Delirium	Ihor Podolchak	
2013	Trance	Danny Boyle	
2013	Man of Steel	Zack Snyder	
2012	Pizza	Karthik Subburaj	
2012	Premium Rush	David Koepp	
2012	The Dark Knight Rises	Christopher Nolan	
2012	3	Aishwarya Rajinikanth	
2011	Aaranya Kaandam	Thiagarajan Kumararaja	
2011	The Tree of Life	Terrence Malick	
2010	Blue Valentine	Derek Cianfrance	
2010	The Social Network	David Fincher	

== 2000s ==
=== 2009 ===
Year	Title	Director	Note
2009	500 Days of Summer	Marc Webb	
2009	Across the Hall	Alex Merkin	
2009	Mr. Nobody	Jaco Van Dormael	
2009	Shorts	Robert Rodriguez	
2009	Watchmen	Zack Snyder	hyperlink cinema

=== 2008 ===
Year	Title	Director	Note
2008	Downloading Nancy	Johan Renck	
2008	Las Meninas	Ihor Podolchak	
2008	Love Exposure	Sion Sono	
2008	Patti Smith: Dream of Life	Steven Sebring	
2008	The Air I Breathe	Lee Ji-ho	hyperlink cinema
2008	Speed Racer	The Wachowskis	
2008	Hell Ride	Larry Bishop	
2008	Brideshead Revisited	Julian Jarrold	
2008	Che	Steven Soderbergh	
2008	JCVD	Mabrouk El Mechri	
2008	Slumdog Millionaire	Danny Boyle	
2008	The Burning Plain	Guillermo Arriaga	

=== 2007 ===
Year	Title	Director	Note
2007	Into the Wild	Sean Penn	
2007	Paranoid Park	Gus Van Sant	
2007	La Môme (La Vie en Rose)	Olivier Dahan	
2007	Surf's Up	Ash Brannon, Chris Buck	
2007	Rendition	Gavin Hood	
2007	Before the Devil Knows You're Dead	Sidney Lumet	
2007	Atonement	Joe Wright	
2007	Michael Clayton	Tony Gilroy	
2007	I'm Not There	Todd Haynes	
2007	Premonition	Mennan Yapo	
2007	The Full Monteverdi	John La Bouchardiere	
2007	The Tracey Fragments	Bruce McDonald	
2007	Youth Without Youth	Francis Ford Coppola	
2007	Things We Lost in the Fire	Susanne Bier	
2007	Jara Bristite Bhijechhilo	Anjan Das	

=== 2006 ===
Year	Title	Director	Note
2006
2006	The Good Shepherd	Robert De Niro	
2006	The Fountain	Darren Aronofsky	
2006	The Prestige	Christopher Nolan	
2006	Away from Her	Sarah Polley	
2006	Flags of Our Fathers	Clint Eastwood	
2006	Glastonbury	Julien Temple	
2006	Unknown	Simon Brand	
2006	Babel	Alejandro González Iñárritu	
2006	Pan's Labyrinth	Guillermo del Toro	
2006	Reprise	Joachim Trier	

=== 2005 ===
Year	Title	Director	Note
2005	Sin City	Frank Miller, Robert Rodriguez	hyperlink cinema
2005	Batman Begins	Christopher Nolan	
2005	Where the Truth Lies	Atom Egoyan	
2005	I Love Your Work	Adam Goldberg	
2005	Hoodwinked!	Cory Edwards; Todd Edwards; Tony Leech	
2005	The Call of Cthulhu	Andrew Leman	
2005	Doom	Andrzej Bartkowiak	
2005	Last Days	Gus Van Sant	
2005	The Jacket	John Maybury	
2005	Breakfast on Pluto	Neil Jordan	
2005	The Constant Gardener	Fernando Meirelles	
2005	Snuff-Movie	Bernard Rose	

=== 2004 ===
Year	Title	Director	Note
2004	Alexander	Oliver Stone	
2004	Closer	Mike Nichols	
2004	Eternal Sunshine of the Spotless Mind	Michel Gondry	
2004	The Grudge	Takashi Shimizu	
2004	Haven	Frank E. Flowers	
2004	Wicker Park	Paul McGuigan	remake based on L'Appartement (1996)
2004	Primer	Shane Carruth	

=== 2003 ===
Year	Title	Director	Note
2003	Kill Bill	Quentin Tarantino	
2003	Ju-on: The Grudge 2	Takashi Shimizu	remake based on Ju-on 2 (2000)
2003	Ju-on: The Grudge	Takashi Shimizu	remake based on Ju-on (2000)
2003	Identity	James Mangold	
2003	21 Grams	Alejandro González Iñárritu	hyperlink cinema
2003	Elephant	Gus Van Sant	
2003	Oldboy	Park Chan-wook	
2003	Wonderland	James Cox	
2003	11:14	Greg Marcks	

=== 2002 ===
Year	Title	Director	Note
2002	Confessions of a Dangerous Mind	George Clooney	
2002	Solaris	Steven Soderbergh	remake based on Solaris (1972)
2002	Abandon	Stephen Gaghan	
2002	Adaptation.	Spike Jonze	
2002	American Gun	Alan Jacobs	
2002	Irréversible	Gaspar Noé	reverse chronology
2002	He Loves Me... He Loves Me Not	Laetitia Colombani	
2002	Cremaster 3	Matthew Barney	
2002	Ararat	Atom Egoyan	
2002	City of God	Fernando Meirelles	
2002	The Rules of Attraction	Roger Avary	
2002	The Hours	Stephen Daldry	
2002	Hero	Zhang Yimou	The story of assassins is recollected from varying perspectives and framed by a discussion between the king and an assassin called Nameless. The various chapters are delineated by different colors.

=== 2001 ===
Year	Title	Director	Note
2001	Mulholland Drive	David Lynch	
2001	Thirteen Conversations About One Thing	Jill Sprecher	
2001	Sex and Lucia	Julio Médem	
2001	In Praise of Love	Jean-Luc Godard	
2001	Ghosts of Mars	John Carpenter	
2001	Vanilla Sky	Cameron Crowe	remake based on Abre los ojos (1997)

=== 2000 ===
Year	Title	Director	Note
2000	The Weight of Water	Kathryn Bigelow	
2000	Ju-on 2	Takashi Shimizu	
2000	Ju-on	Takashi Shimizu	
2000	Chaos	Hideo Nakata	
2000	The Emperor's New Groove	Mark Dindal	
2000	In the Mood for Love	Wong Kar-wai	
2000	Joint Security Area	Park Chan-wook	
2000	Memento	Christopher Nolan	Two plot lines, simultaneously developing in opposite directions, join in a final scene at the film's conclusion.
2000	Happenstance	Laurent Firode	
2000	Pay It Forward	Mimi Leder	The main plot, involving Kevin Spacey, Helen Hunt, and Haley Joel Osment, moves forward in time; while in the subplot, investigative journalist Chandler (Jay Mohr) tracks the altruism movement backward in time.
2000	Virgin Stripped Bare by Her Bachelors	Hong Sang-soo	
2000	Amores perros	Alejandro González Iñárritu	hyperlink cinema
2000	Urbania	Jon Shear	

== 1990s ==
=== 1999 ===
Year	Title	Director	Note
1999	Peppermint Candy	Lee Chang-dong	reverse chronology
1999	Cremaster 2	Matthew Barney	
1999	Charming Billy	Wm. R. Pace	
1999	Snow Falling on Cedars	Scott Hicks	
1999	Jesus' Son	Alison Maclean	
1999	eXistenZ	David Cronenberg	
1999	Time Regained	Raúl Ruiz	
1999	Go	Doug Liman	hyperlink cinema
1999	The Limey	Steven Soderbergh	
1999	The Loss of Sexual Innocence	Mike Figgis	

=== 1998 ===
Year	Title	Director	Note
1998	Sliding Doors	Peter Howitt	
1998	Run Lola Run	Tom Tykwer	
1998	Out of Sight	Steven Soderbergh	
1998	The Thin Red Line	Terrence Malick	
1998	Firestorm	Dean Semler	
1998	Following	Christopher Nolan	
1998	New Rose Hotel	Abel Ferrara	

=== 1997 ===
Year	Title	Director	Note
1997	Lost Highway	David Lynch	
1997	The Shining	Mick Garris	
1997	Gummo	Harmony Korine	
1997	Titanic	James Cameron	
1997	The Ice Storm	Ang Lee	
1997	The Sweet Hereafter	Atom Egoyan	
1997	The Hanging Garden	Thom Fitzgerald	
1997	Cremaster 5	Matthew Barney	
1997	Genealogies of a Crime	Raúl Ruiz	

=== 1996 ===
Year	Title	Director	Note
1996	L'Appartement	Gilles Mimouni	
1996	Schizopolis	Steven Soderbergh	
1996	Lone Star	John Sayles	
1996	Three Lives and Only One Death	Raúl Ruiz	
1996	The Rich Man's Wife	Amy Holden Jones	
1996	The English Patient	Anthony Minghella	
1996	Pretty Village, Pretty Flame	Srđan Dragojević	
1996	Courage Under Fire	Edward Zwick	

=== 1995 ===
Year	Title	Director	Note
1995	Nixon	Oliver Stone	
1995	Love Letter	Shunji Iwai	
1995	The Usual Suspects	Bryan Singer	

=== 1990–1994 ===
Year	Title	Director	Note
1994	Before the Rain	Milčo Mančevski	
1994	Exotica	Atom Egoyan	
1994	Forrest Gump	Robert Zemeckis	
1994	Natural Born Killers	Oliver Stone	
1994	Sátántangó	Béla Tarr	
1994	Three Colors: Red	Krzysztof Kieślowski	
1994	Pulp Fiction	Quentin Tarantino	hyperlink cinema
1993	Batman: Mask of the Phantasm	Eric Radomski; Bruce Timm	
1993	Calendar	Atom Egoyan	
1993	Smoking/No Smoking	Alain Resnais	
1992	Reservoir Dogs	Quentin Tarantino	
1991	Fried Green Tomatoes	Jon Avnet	
1991	Drop Dead Fred	Ate de Jong	
1991	Daughters of the Dust	Julie Dash	
1990	Close-Up	Abbas Kiarostami	
1990	It	Tommy Lee Wallace	
1990	Jacob's Ladder	Adrian Lyne	
1990	Singapore Sling	Nikos Nikolaidis	

== 1980s ==
Year	Title	Director	Note
1988	Om-Dar-Ba-Dar	Kamal Swaroop	
1987	Siesta	Mary Lambert	
1987	Nuts	Martin Ritt	
1986	Street of Crocodiles	Quay brothers	
1985	Return to Waterloo	Ray Davies	
1984	Broadway Danny Rose	Woody Allen	
1984	Once Upon a Time in America	Sergio Leone	
1982	The Night of the Shooting Stars	Taviani brothers	
1982	Tempest	Paul Mazursky	
1982	Sans Soleil	Chris Marker	
1982	Pink Floyd – The Wall	Alan Parker	
1981	Possession	Andrzej Żuławski	
1981	The Beyond	Lucio Fulci	
1980	Bad Timing	Nicolas Roeg	
1980	In the Shadow of the Sun	Derek Jarman	
1980	Stardust Memories	Woody Allen	

== 1970s ==
Year	Title	Director	Note
1979	More American Graffiti	Bill L. Norton	
1978	Interiors	Woody Allen	
1977	Annie Hall	Woody Allen	
1977	Bhumika	Shyam Benegal	
1975	Mirror	Andrei Tarkovsky	
1974	Celine and Julie Go Boating	Jacques Rivette	
1974	The Phantom of Liberty	Luis Buñuel	
1974	F for Fake	Orson Welles	
1973	Happy New Year	Claude Lelouche	
1973	Lisa and the Devil	Mario Bava	
1973	O Lucky Man!	Lindsay Anderson	
1972	Slaughterhouse-Five	George Roy Hill	
1972	Solaris	Andrei Tarkovsky	
1972	The Discreet Charm of the Bourgeoisie	Luis Buñuel	
1971	200 Motels	Frank Zappa, Tony Palmer	
1971	Voldtekt	Anja Breien	
1970	Catch-22	Mike Nichols	
1970	The Conformist	Bernardo Bertolucci	
1970	Zabriskie Point	Michelangelo Antonioni	

== 1960s ==
Year	Title	Director	Note
1969	The Milky Way	Luis Buñuel	
1969	Beatrice Cenci	Lucio Fulci	
1968	The Color of Pomegranates	Sergei Parajanov	
1968	Petulia	Richard Lester	
1968	Head	Bob Rafelson	
1967	Week End	Jean-Luc Godard	
1967	Belle de Jour	Luis Buñuel	
1967	Point Blank	John Boorman	
1967	Two for the Road	Stanley Donen	
1967	The Trip	Roger Corman	
1967	Magical Mystery Tour	Bernard Knowles	
1966	Gambit	Ronald Neame	
1966	The Battle of Algiers	Gillo Pontecorvo	
1966	Chelsea Girls	Andy Warhol, Paul Morrissey	
1966	Blowup	Michelangelo Antonioni	
1966	Trans-Europ-Express	Alain Robbe-Grillet	
1966	Persona	Ingmar Bergman	
1964	Scorpio Rising	Kenneth Anger	
1964	The Outrage	Martin Ritt	
1963	Diamonds of the Night	Jan Němec	
1963	8½	Federico Fellini	
1963	This Sporting Life	Lindsay Anderson	
1963	Muriel	Alain Resnais	
1962	Harakiri	Masaki Kobayashi	
1962	La Commare Secca	Bernardo Bertolucci	
1962	Lawrence of Arabia	David Lean	
1962	La Jetée	Chris Marker	
1962	Salvatore Giuliano	Francesco Rosi	
1961	Last Year at Marienbad	Alain Resnais	
1960	La Dolce Vita	Federico Fellini	
1960	Breathless	Jean-Luc Godard	

== 1950s ==
Year	Title	Director	Note
1959	Hiroshima, My Love	Alain Resnais	
1958	La vida por delante	Fernando Fernán Gómez	
1958	A Movie	Bruce Conner	
1956	The Killing	Stanley Kubrick	
1955	Lola Montès	Max Ophüls	
1954	Andha Naal	S. Balachander	
1953	A Japanese Tragedy	Keisuke Kinoshita	
1952	The Bad and the Beautiful	Vincente Minnelli	
1950	Rashomon	Akira Kurosawa	

== 1910s – 1940s ==
Year	Title	Director	Note
1947	Stray Dog	Akira Kurosawa	
1947	Out of the Past	Jacques Tourneur	
1946	The Locket	John Brahm	
1946	The Killers	Robert Siodmak	
1945	Mildred Pierce	Michael Curtiz	
1944	The Great Moment	Preston Sturges|	
1945	Brief Encounter	David Lean	
1945	The Lost Weekend	Billy Wilder	
1944	Double Indemnity	Billy Wilder	
1944	Laura	Otto Preminger	
1941	Citizen Kane	Orson Welles	
1940	Rebecca	Alfred Hitchcock	
1936	Show Boat	James Whale	
1933	The Power and the Glory	William K. Howard	
1927	Napoléon	Abel Gance	
1924	Sherlock Jr.	Buster Keaton	
1921	The Phantom Carriage	Victor Sjöström	
1921	Destiny	Fritz Lang	
1916	Intolerance	D. W. Griffith	

== See also ==
- Nonlinear narrative
- Nonlinear gameplay
- Reverse chronology
- Hypertext fiction
- Hyperlink cinema
- Lists of films
  - List of non-narrative feature films
