= Merry-Go-Round (2017 film) =

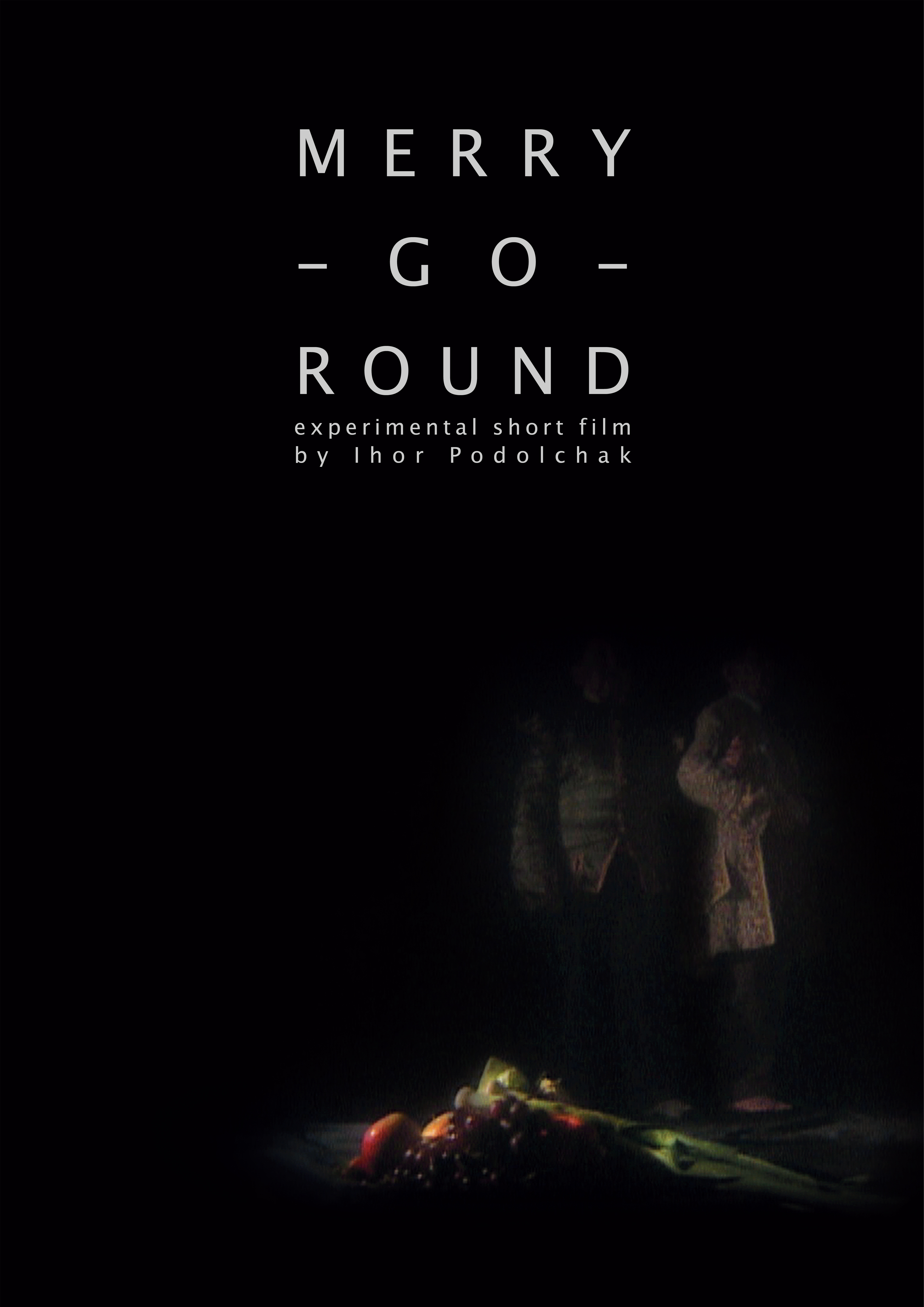
- Theatrical release poster
- Directed by: Ihor Podolchak
- Written by: Ihor Podolchak
- Produced by: Ihor Podolchak; Liliya Mlynarych; Ihor Dyurych; Max Asadchiy; Serhiy Nedzelskyy
- Cinematography: Serhiy Mykhalchuk
- Edited by: Ihor Podolchak
- Music by: Alexander Shchetynsky
- Distributed by: Ihor Podolchak
- Release dates: July 6, 2017 (Revelation Film Festival, Perth, Australia)
- Running time: 5 minutes
- Countries: Ukraine, Poland
- Language: None
- Budget: US$ 10,000

Merry-Go-Round (2017, Ukraine, Poland. 5 min.) – a short film by Ukrainian film director Ihor Podolchak, produced in 2017. Producers of the film, along with Igor Podolchak were Ihor Dyurych, Liliya Mlynarych, Max Asadchiy, Serhiy Nedzelskyy. Director of photography – Serhiy Mykhalchuk, art director Svitlana Makarenko. Music for the film was created by Oleksandr Shchetynsky. The world premiere of the film took place on July 9, 2017, in Australia in the program of the IFF in Perth "Revelation". The film was nominated for the National Film Award at the Odesa International Film Festival.

A laconic exercise - only five minutes - by the Lviv artist-expressionist and director of baroque, somewhat, blurred psychodrama (Las Meninas, Delirium), in the genre of video sculpture.

== About the director ==
Among the contemporary artists who became filmmakers, Ihor Podolchak is a figure obvious. Unlike Matthew Barney and Marina Abramović he does not balance on the verge of conceptual video art but he is engaged in cinematography in its pure form. At the same time, Podolchak's films are much closer to experimental cinema than those films that are shot by other contemporary artists.

== Synopsis ==
Somnambulistic circus Ribera&Velazquez welcomes everyone to the show "Merry-Go-Round", where shadows, that escaped the Platonic cave, turn the carousel in the foggy catacombs.

== Specifications ==
The film was shot in Betacam SP, PAL format. Projection Format: DCP. Sound: Stereo. Aspect Ratio: 16: 9 (HD), 1.85: 1 (2K DCP Flat).

== Participation in festivals ==
- 2017 – Revelation. Perth International Film Festival. Perth, Australia.
- 2017 – Brisbane International Film Festival. Australia.
- 2017 – Braunschweig International Film Festival. Braunschweig, Germany.
- 2018 – Fantasporto – Oporto International Film Festival. Porto, Portugal.
- 2018 – Experimental Video Show. The Exchange Gallery. Bloomsburg, PA, USA.
- 2018 – North Bellarine Film Festival, Australia.
- 2018 – Scandinavian International Film Festival. Helsinki, Finland.
- 2019 – Spectral Film Festival. Stevens Point, USA.
- 2019 – Paris European Film Festival "L'Europe autour de l'Europe". France;
- 2019 – Festival ECRA. Ріо-де-Жанейро, Бразилія;
- 2019 – L’Age d’Or International Arthouse Film Festival. Kolcata, India;
- 2019 – Cineautopsia v.5. Bogotá Experimental Film Festival. Colombia;
- 2019 – The Unseen Festival. Denver USA;
- 2019 – STRANGLOSCOPE – Mostra Internacional de Áudio, Vídeo, Filme. Brazyl;
- 2019 – Firenze FilmCorti Festival. Italy.

== Nominations ==
- Prix Sauvage Corto. Paris European Film Festival L'Europe autour de l'Europe. France
- The best Ukrainian short film. Odesa International Film Festival.
- Avant-guarde & Experimental Special Award. Skepto International Film Festival. Cagliari, Italy.
- Best Experimental Film. Lecce European Film Festival, Italy.
