= Masoch Fund =

External videos
- Art in Space, 1993
- Mausoleum for the President, 1994
- The Best Artists of the 20th Century - Pol Pot, 2001
- The Best Artists of the 20th Century - Mao Zedong, 2001
- The Best Artists of the 20th Century - Sigmund Freud, 2001

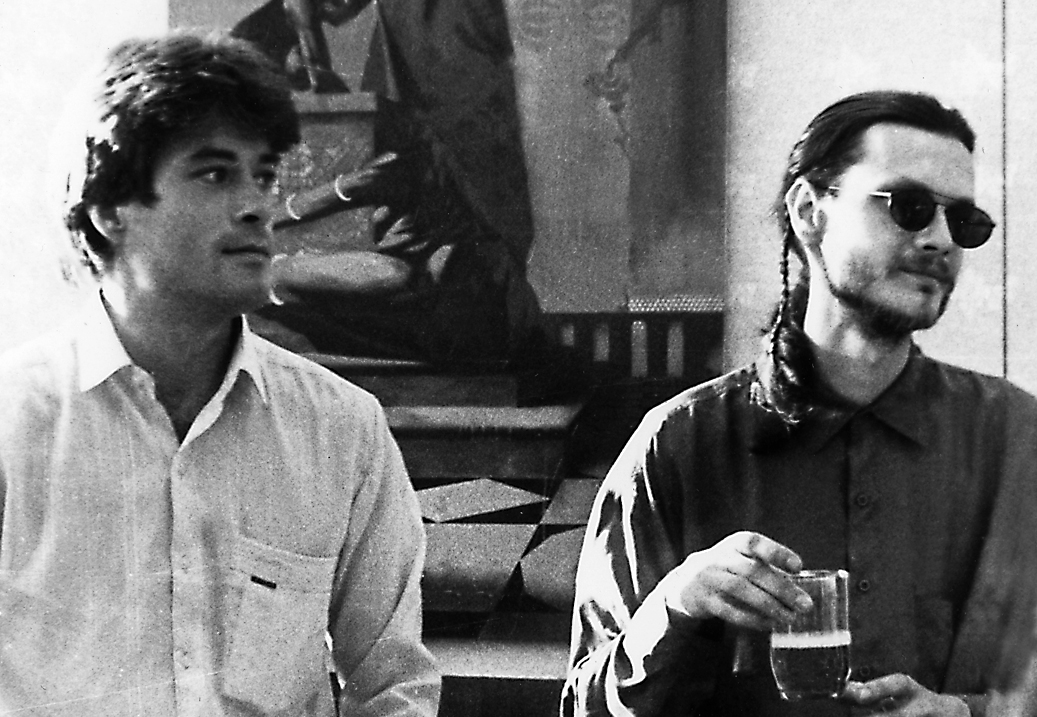
Ihor Dyurych and Ihor Podolchak. Lviv, 1992

The Masoch Fund is a Ukrainian art association founded in 1991 in Lviv by Roman Viktyuk, Ihor Podolchak and Ihor Dyurych. Its artistic practice is connected with the tradition of European actionism and Nicolas Bourriaud's "relational aesthetics". The Fund is named after Leopold von Sacher-Masoch, which makes a reference to the marginal fields of culture and society and also underlines the locality (Sacher-Masoch was born in Lviv).

The ideological principle of the Masoch Fund is "Aesthetics contra Ethics". Podolchak and Dyurych are called the masters of perfectly elaborated provocations. The Masoch Fund reveals and criticizes the fetishist mentality of modern society and tests the institutional boundaries of contemporary art.

The Masoch Fund focuses on the social, political and economic context of the Ukrainian society. Unlike other action artists whose work often refers to personal experience (Marina Abramović) or mysterial impermeability (Viennese Actionists), the Masoch Fund emphasizes the active role of its audience. It can be best compared to the work of Slovenian artists' collective IRWIN, Danish artists' group Superflex and the tandem of Svetlana Heger and Plamen Dejanov.

In 2006–2010, the Masoch Fund included a subsidiary production company, MF Films, that produced the films Las Meninas and Delirium.

== Selected works ==
=== Art in Space (1993) ===
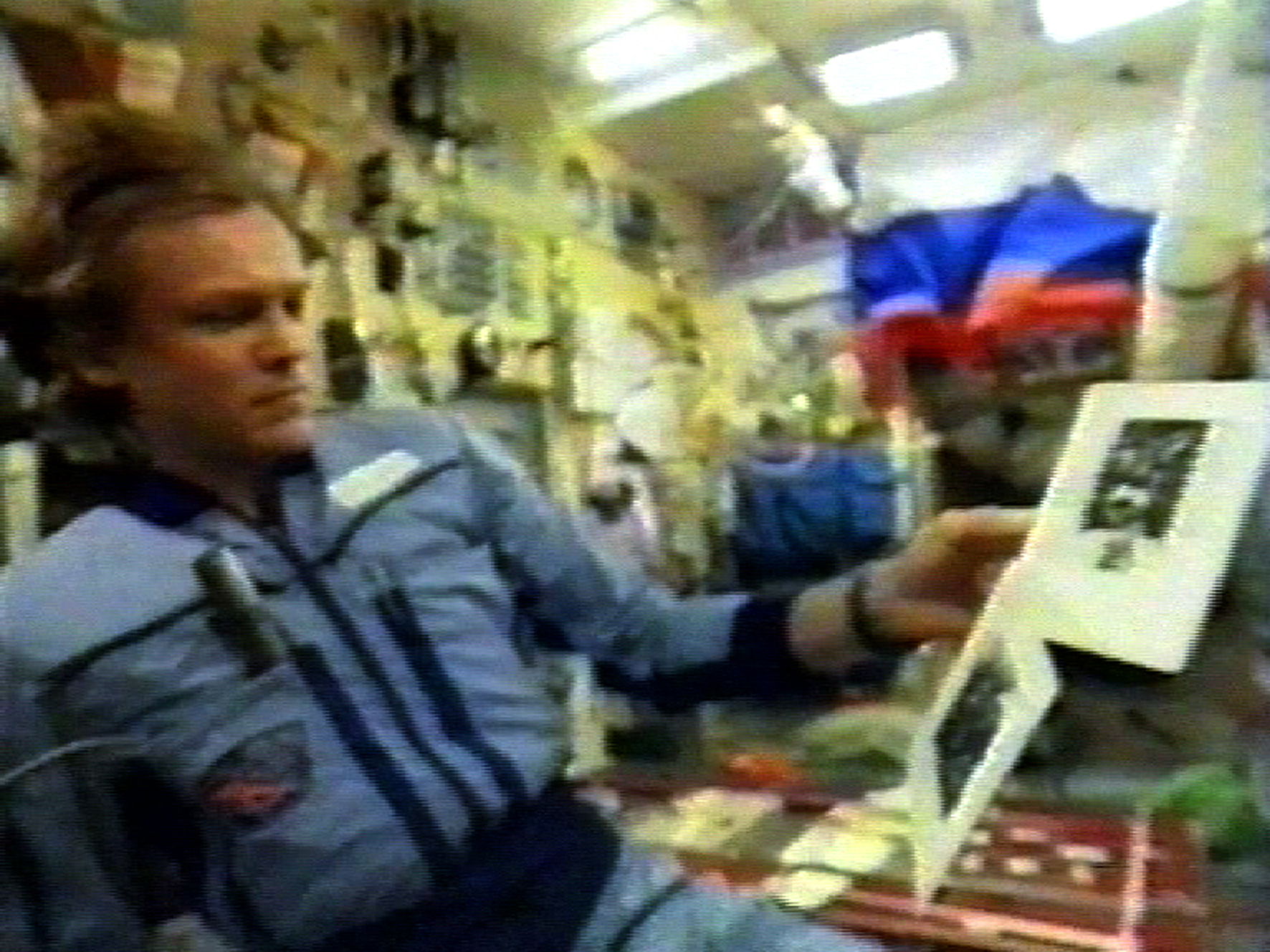
Ihor Podolchak's solo exhibition. Space station Mir, 1993

The project involved two stages. The first stage was a personal exhibition of Ihor Podolchak in the outer space. The exhibition took place on board of the space station Mir on January 25, 1993. The project was documented on video (5 minutes). The exhibited objects included Untitled (1990), The Look Through (1991). The third engraving that was planned to be exhibited was dismissed by a doctor from the mission control center due to its explicit erotic content. The second stage involved sending Podolchak's artbook Jakob Böhme to the space station and its subsequent putting into orbit. According to the authors’ conception, the book on orbit would become the first "ARTificial" satellite of the Earth. Technical problems at the space station Mir in the late 1990s prevented this part of the project from being realized. Art in Space project brings up the problem of existence of a work of art outside the cultural context and, to some extent, calls out to revise the evaluation criteria for art.

=== Mausoleum for the President (1994) ===
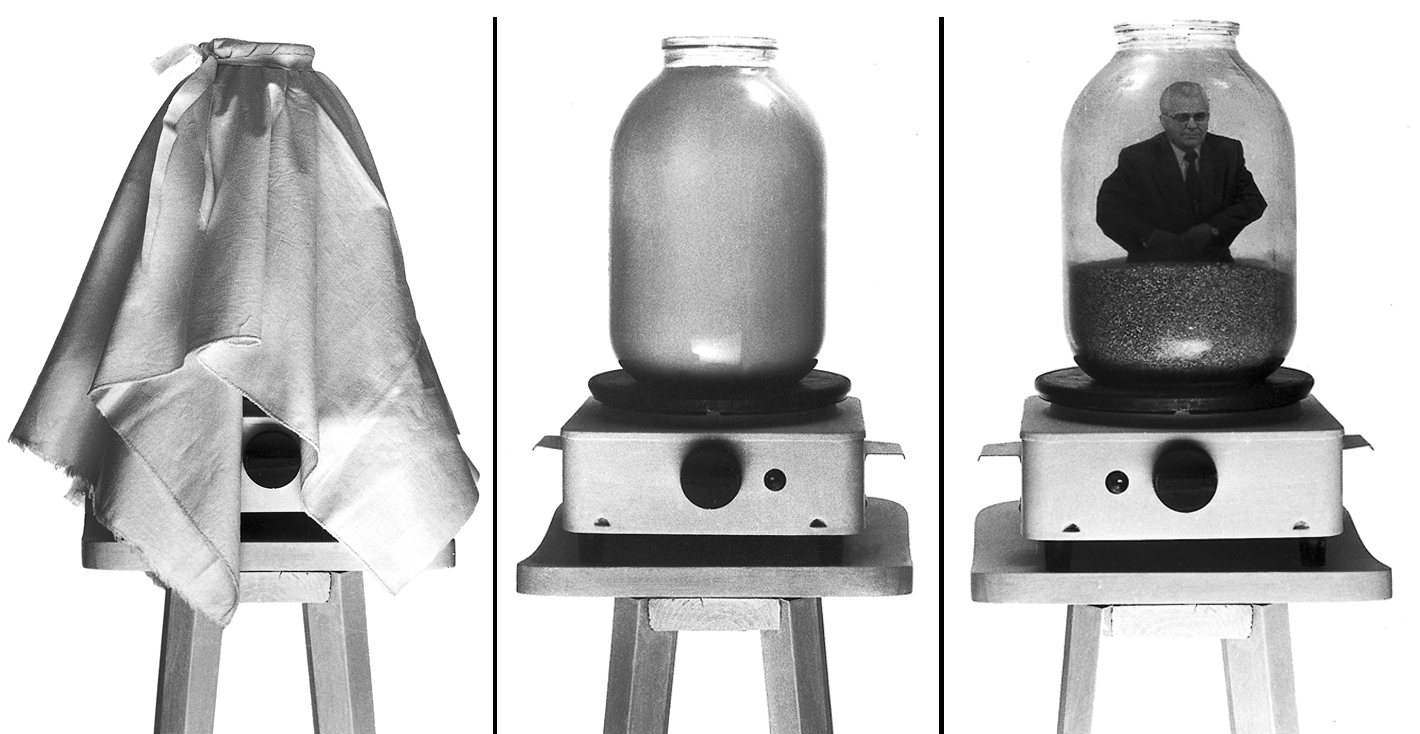
Mausoleum for the President. Art object, 1994

The work consisted of a jar with lard and pork rinds, an electric hot plate and a photo of the first President of Ukraine Leonid Kravchuk placed in lard. When the hot plate was on, lard in the jar melted, becoming transparent and revealing the preserved (mummified) image of the President. Mausoleum for the President was completed before the presidential election. It summarized the "romantic" period of the modern history of Ukraine – acquiring independence. The project proclaimed liberation of Ukrainian people from mental constraints which prevented them from gaining real independence. The topic of mausoleum was a provocation that implied historical parallels and political speculations. The work represented a search for the national recipe of mummification (lard and pork rinds are Ukrainian "totemic accessories").

=== Climax (1994) ===
The project was presented by Ihor Podolchak and Ihor Dyurych to George Soros during his meeting with Ukrainian artists. Soros was suggested to build a 40 meters high ice pyramid superstructure over Mount Everest. As a result, the highest peak on the Earth would reach symbolic 8,888 meters – four infinity symbols that would represent humanistic aspirations of the mankind. However, Soros humorously refused to participate in the project.

=== Happy Victory Day, Mr. Muller! (1995) ===
(German: Zum Tag des Sieges von Herrn Muller) On May 8, 1995, on the anniversary date of the end of World War II on the Eastern Front, 5500 Müllers (bearers of the most common and emblematic German surname) who lived in Berlin received greetings from the Masoch Fund saying “Happy Victory Day!”. The greeting card featured the image of 1945 Reichstag with a red flag and Christo and Jeanne-Claude's 1995 wrapped Reichstag as a supermarket product – the symbols of the beginning and the end of the 50-year-long post-war history. The project deconstructed the image of “winners and losers” in World War II. In 1995, Germany was an economically and politically powerful state, while the Soviet Union that had seemingly won the war already ceased to exist.

=== The Last Jewish Pogrom (1995) ===
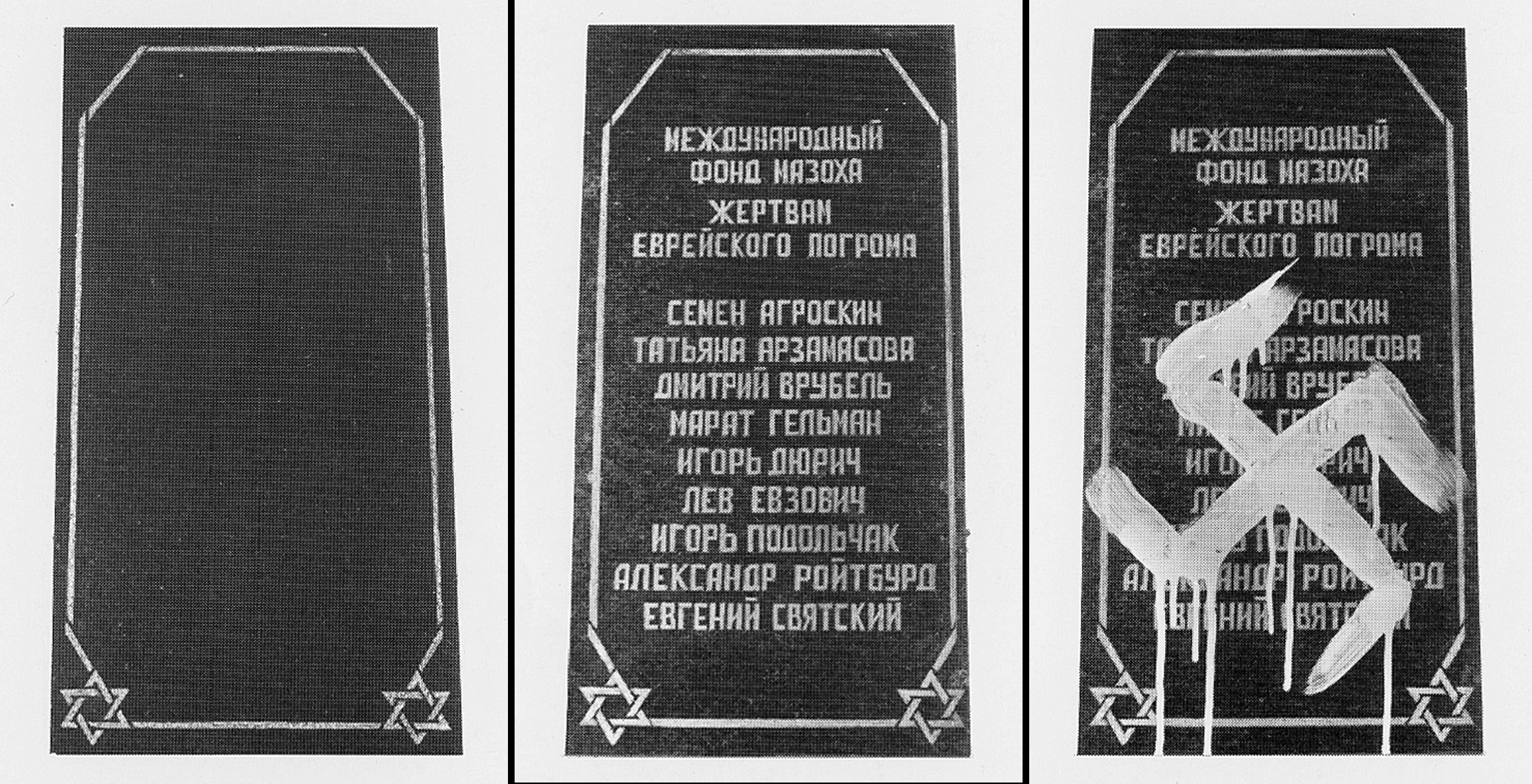
The Last Jewish Pogrom. Art object, 1995

The Last Jewish Pogrom was announced not as an art project but as a real event. Each spectator had to become a participant and choose the role of either the victim or the pogrom-maker. “Victims” were numbered and bonded to comply with the rules on the “pogrom territory” (not to leave the room, not to consume alcohol, etc.), and “pogrom makers” received a shot of vodka at the entrance. Most participants chose the roles of victims. The actual pogrom did not happen. The Masoch Fund organized an auction, and the “pogrom makers” became “schindlers” (the myth of Oskar Schindler) and ransomed the “victims”. The action raised the problem of responsibility of choice and safety of artistic space.

=== The Last Concert Tour in Ukraine (2000) ===
On the day when Bill Clinton was giving a speech in Kyiv, the Masoch Fund stuck around posters “The Last Concert Tour in Ukraine” featuring the American President playing sax. The official tour of the head of a foreign state was reduced to a concert tour of a mediocre musician.

=== The Best Artists of the 20th Century (2001) ===
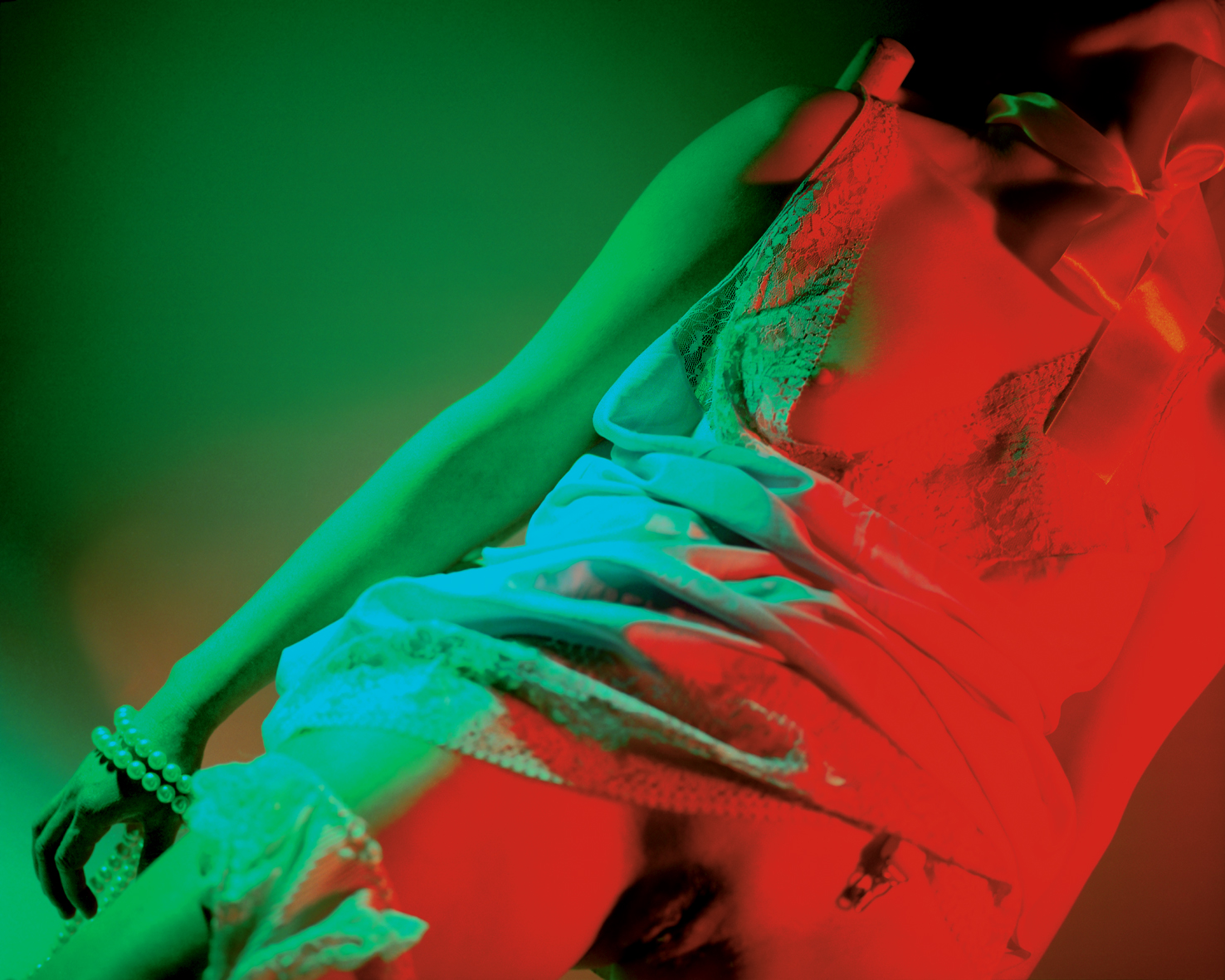
Ihor Podolchak. "De Salvo. Still Life". Color photo 70x100 cm. 2001. From the art project "The Best artists of the 20th Century"

Curator: Jerzy Onuch. Among the best artists there were presented fictitious works of politicians (Adolf Hitler – installations, actions; Mao Zedong – actions, video art; Nikita Khrushchev – land art, actions; Kim Il Sung – self-portraits); scientists (Sigmund Freud – video art); criminals (Bonnie and Clyde – wedding photo album; Al Capone – “racket art”, etc.). All participants of the project were represented not only by their quasi artworks (which in fact were created by Podolchak), but also by their personalized product brands (Saddam Hussein – perfumes, Ulrike Meinhof – insurance business, etc.) This project of the Masoch Fund was selected for the first Ukrainian exhibition at the 2001 Venice Biennale. After the notorious interference of the deputy prime minister of Ukraine Mykola Zhulynskyi, the project was cancelled.

=== From the Masoch Fund to the People of Ukraine (2005) ===
This conceptual project involved several possible scenarios of development of Ukraine, such as “Picturesque Ukraine”, “Masochistic Ukraine”, “Marginal Ukraine”, “American Ukraine”, “Multimonarchial Ukraine”, “Commercial Ukraine”. For example, the “Marginal Ukraine” project referred to border closure, cancellation of diplomatic relationships with all the countries, renewal of the nuclear power of the state, disbanding the governmental bodies, and disintegrating cities into villages. It was proposed to hold a referendum and define the principal direction of the country's development by choosing one of the Masoch Fund's projects.

== Sources ==
- Akinsha, K.; Holubizky, I.; Mendel Art Gallery. On the margin. Saskatoon: Mendel Art Gallery, 1999. ISBN 978-1-896359-23-6
- Kiyiv Art Meeting. New Art from Poland, Ukraine, Russia. / Тараненко, Андрій, Київ: Український дім / Галерея «Аліпій», 1995, pp. 38–47 (in Russian)
- Lehmann, B. Wir sind hipper, cooler, reicher. Die Zeit, 28.09.2006 Nr. 40. Retrieved December 14, 2011 (in German)
- Lehmann, B.Ukraine echt Im Land von Schein und Sein. Die Zeit, 29.01.2004. Retrieved December 14, 2011 (in German)
- Mikhaylovska Olena; Podolchak, Igor; Taranenko Andrey. Corpus delicti: post-erotic art photography. Prague: Masoch Fund, 1998. ISBN 978-966-71-6716-5
- Mikhaylovska, O.; Podolchak, I.; Taranenko, A.. Corpus delicti : post-erotic art photography. Multimedia CD. Prague: Masoch Fund, 1998.
- Баздырева, А. К «Космической Одиссее» будь готов!. Art Ukraine, Feb., 2011 (in Russian)
- Дюрич, І; Подольчак, І.; Тісто, O. Igor Podolchak : immoral-immortal. Львів: Фонд Мазоха, 1999. ISBN 966-5371-15-0
- Дюрич, І.; Подольчак, І.. The Best Artists of the 2oth Century. Multimedia CD. Kyiv: Masoch Fund, 2001
- Мистецька мапа України: Львів — живопис, графіка, скульптура. Київ: I︠U︡velir-pres, 2008. ISBN 978-966-965-794-7 (in Ukrainian)
- Бурхлива історія Фонду Мазоха. Свобода, Apr. 9, 2010 (in Ukrainian)
