= Alexander Shchetynsky =

Ukrainian composer (born 1960)

External videos
- Las Meninas (episode)

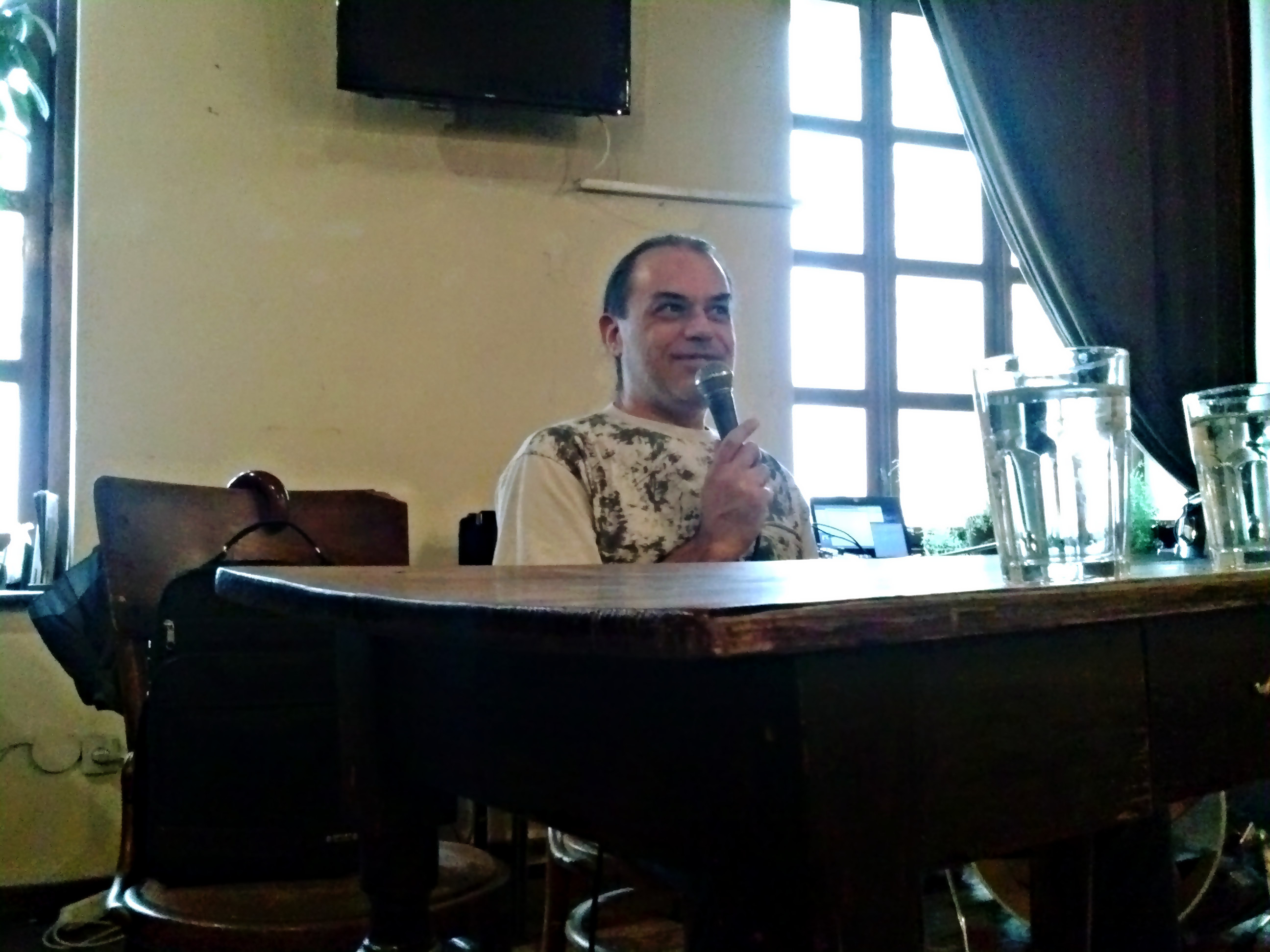
Alexander Shchetynsky Lviv 2016

Alexander Shchetynsky (Shchetinsky) (Ukrainian: Олекса́ндр Степа́нович Щети́нський; Russian: Алекса́ндр Степа́нович Щети́нский; Aleksandr Stepanovich Shchetins'kiy) is a Ukrainian composer. Born on 22 June 1960 in Kharkiv, in the Ukrainian SSR of the Soviet Union. His work list includes compositions in various forms ranging from solo instrumental to orchestral, choral pieces and operas.

== Education and influences ==
Shchetynsky graduated from the Kharkiv Art Institute in 1983. Although he studied composition officially with Valentyn Borysov, another Ukrainian composer, Valentyn Bibik, strongly influenced him in those formative years. Another important source of inspiration was so called Soviet musical avant-garde: Edison Denisov, Alfred Schnittke, Arvo Pärt, Sofia Gubaidulina, Valentin Silvestrov. Later Shchetynsky participated in master classes with Edison Denisov and Poul Ruders in Denmark, and summer courses in Poland, where he attended lectures by Louis Andriessen, Witold Lutosławski, Krzysztof Penderecki, Boguslaw Schaeffer, and Magnus Lindberg. Music of the Second Viennese School, Olivier Messiaen, and György Ligeti had a significant impact on Shchetynsky.

== Performances ==
Since the late 80s, his music has been presented at festivals and concerts in Europe and America, performed by internationally acclaimed artists and ensembles, such as the Moscow Helikon Opera, the BBC National Orchestra of Wales, the Warsaw Philharmonic Orchestra, children's choir Maîtrise de Radio France, the Arditti String Quartet, the Moscow Contemporary Music Ensemble, Ensemble Wiener Collage, Mark Pekarsky Percussion Ensemble, pianist Yvar Mikhashoff, soprano Phyllis Bryn-Julson, a.o. Among the publishers of Shchetynsky are Alain Van Kerckhoven Editeur, Boosey & Hawkes, Le Chant du Monde, and Gerard Billaudot Editeur S.A. Two "portrait" CDs with his music were released in the US and France. In 2011 NAXOS released the CD 'New Sacred Music from Ukraine' with his choral works.

== Awards ==
Shchetynsky received seven international composer's awards:

- Main and Special prizes at the International Kazimierz Serocki Competition, Poland (for orchestral work Glossolalie, 1990),
- First Prize at the International Sacred Music Competition, Fribourg, Switzerland (for The Preacher's Word for soprano and string quartet, 1991),
- Second Prize at the International Witold Lutosłavski Competition, Poland (for Flute Concerto, 1995),
- Second Prize at the International Henri Dutilleux Competition, Saint-Pierre-des-Corps, France (for The Baptism, Temptation and Prayer of our Lord Jesus Christ for bass, clarinet, trombone, viola, cello and double bass, 1996),
- Third Prize at the International Gustav Mahler Competition, Klagenfurt, Austria (for Sonata da camera for cello and chamber ensemble, 1998),
- Russian National Theatrical Prize, Gold Mask, in the category innovation (for chamber opera Annunciation in frame of the performance Voices of the Invisible – The Bible Triptych at the Helikon Opera in Moscow, 2000).
- Second Prize at the International Composition Prize Luxembourg 2006, Luxembourg (for Chamber Concerto for piano and 12 instrumentalists, 2006)

== Style ==
At the age of about 30, he developed his personal post-serial style based on combination of quasi-serial procedures and special attention to attractiveness of sound material and to melody as a source of expression. Another fundamental feature of his music is its rhythmic, structural and formal flexibility, which provokes feeling of "self-development" of initial micro-thematic patterns. The idea of modern spirituality became an impulse for many his vocal and instrumental compositions. This is particularly significant in his 3 operas and several choral compositions written recently. Moscow critic Alexey Parin referred to Shchetynsky as "a consequent stickler for avant-garde" and stated that "his spirituality reveals in strict, ascetically beautiful sounds that impress with their hermetism, within the context of up-to-date musical language". Nevertheless, in his newest compositions he moves towards postmodernistic aesthetics utilizing stylistic elements of various epochs. However, he stays apart from eclecticism and aims at finding a new unity in combination of those musical elements that historically never existed next to each other.

"His style is essentially that of a structuralist, relying on a synthesis of a variety of modernist techniques and exploring in each piece a particular musical metaphor. This method explains his reliance on pieces with descriptive titles. The influence of an especially eastern European variety of minimalism (more meditative and less didactic) is also apparent in the carefully worked out relationship between different degrees of sound and silence, the predominance of soft dynamics, and in the smallest details and changes in pitch, timbre and rhythm."

== Pedagogical activities ==
From 1982 to 1990 Shchetynsky taught composition at a music school in Kharkiv utilizing the Brainin Teaching Method of music education.

From 1991 to 1995 he taught composition, instrumentation, and techniques of contemporary music at the Kharkiv Art Institute. Since 1995, although being a free-lance composer, he regularly lectured on Ukrainian music, gave master classes, and presented own works at international festivals and symposia in Austria, Germany, Macedonia, the Netherlands, Poland, Slovakia, Switzerland, and Ukraine. Since 2018 he teaches composition, instrumentation, and other music theory subjects at the Kharkiv National Kotlyarevsky University of Arts.

== Public and management activities ==
From 1997 to 2005 Shchetynsky was the member of the Art Council of the Festival Contrasts in Lviv – the biggest and most prestigious international contemporary music festival in Ukraine. He was among the organisers of several other contemporary music festivals in Ukraine and Russia, and from 1995 to 2001 ran concert series New Music in Kharkiv.

Since 2006 he lives in Kyiv.

== Music for movies ==
He wrote the scores for three films which was written, directed and produced by Ihor Podolchak:

- Las Meninas, (2008, Ukraine);
- Delirium, (2013, Ukraine, Czech Republic);
- Merry-Go-Round, (2017, Ukraine, Poland).
