= Williams-Ellis =

Williams-Ellis is a surname and may refer to:

- Clough Williams-Ellis (1883–1978), British architect
- David Williams-Ellis (born 1959), British sculptor
- Hywel Williams-Ellis, British actor
- Susan Williams-Ellis (1918–2007), English pottery designer, who was best known for co-founding Portmeirion Pottery
