= Ian Mercer =

British actor

- Born: 10 July 1961 (age 65); Oldham, Lancashire, England
- Education: Northumbria University
- Occupation: Actor
- Years active: 1982–present
- Spouse: Susan E. Fenwick (div.)
- Children: 2

Ian Cameron Mercer (born 10 July 1961) is an English actor. He is known for playing Gary Mallett in the ITV soap opera Coronation Street from 1995 to 2000, having previously appeared in 1987 as Pete Jackson. His other television credits include Brookside (1982–83), Cracker (1993), and The Street (2007).

== Early life ==
Mercer was born in Oldham, Lancashire. On leaving school, Mercer trained as an electrical engineer but decided to become an actor when he became an assistant stage manager at the Oldham Coliseum Theatre in 1979.

== Career ==
His first television appearance was as Mile in Starting Out (1982), a series made by ATV for schools and written by Grazyna Monvid.

Mercer went on to work in such stage productions as Bent, Spend Spend Spend, Saturday Night, Sunday Morning, Billy Liar, Stop The Children's Laughter, Welcome Home, Romeo and Juliet, The Fancy Man, The York Realist, Beauty and the Beast and Revengers Tragedy.

His television and film acting credits include leading roles as a butcher in Blue Money (1985), Coronation Street (as Gary Mallett and in 1987, Pete Jackson), Shackleton (with Kenneth Branagh), Heartbeat, The Monocled Mutineer, A Touch of Frost, Cracker, Common As Muck, Peak Practice, New Tricks and Master and Commander: The Far Side of the World (with Russell Crowe). In 2009 he appeared in an episode of Doctors and two episodes of Waking the Dead. He appeared as Blackbeard's chief zombie henchman in Pirates of the Caribbean: On Stranger Tides. During August and September 2015 he returned to Doctors playing the recurring role of Andy Weston in an ongoing sub-plot.

In 2018, Mercer appeared in the Mike Leigh film, Peterloo, playing the "buffoonish" Dr Healey.

== Personal life ==
In 2007, Mercer completed three years of study at Northumbria University, gaining a degree in English and Art History.

In May 2011, he was convicted of benefit fraud, having falsely claimed £2,300 in council tax benefit despite being in work at the time. He was fined £165 with a £15 victim surcharge and £100 costs.

He lives in Northumberland with his two daughters, Scarlett Rae (b. 1997) and Carmine Mae (b. 2000).

== Filmography ==
=== Film ===
| Year | Title | Role | Director | Notes |
|---|---|---|---|---|
| 1990 | Alex | John | Beeban Kidron | Short film |
| 2002 | Re-inventing Eddie | Dougie | Jim Doyle | |
| 2003 | Master and Commander: The Far Side of the World | Mr. Hollar, Boatswain | Peter Weir | |
| 2005 | Lassie | Yorkshire Policeman | Charles Sturridge | |
| 2009 | The Boat That Rocked | Transfer Boatman | Richard Curtis | |
| 2009 | Creation | Goodman | Jon Amiel | |
| 2010 | Poor Wee Me | Mike | Simon Powell | |
| 2010 | Gold Top | Terry | Satvinder Johal | Short film |
| 2011 | Pirates of the Caribbean: On Stranger Tides | Quartermaster (Thomas Miller) | Rob Marshall | |
| 2016 | The Legend of Tarzan | Freckled Force Publique | David Yates | |
| 2018 | Peterloo | Dr. Joseph Healey | Mike Leigh | |
| 2022 | The Sea Beast | Old Nick (voice) | Chris Williams | Netflix film |

=== Television ===
| Year | Title | Role | Notes |
|---|---|---|---|
| 1982 | Starting Out | Milo | 5 episodes |
| 1982–1983 | Brookside | Demon Duane | 5 episodes |
| 1984 | Crown Court | Michael Rofe | 1 episode |
| 1984 | Weekend Playhouse | Brian | 1 episode |
| 1984–1985 | How We Used to Live | Freddy Selby | 3 episodes |
| 1985 | One by One | Colin | 2 episodes |
| 1986–1990 | ScreenPlay | Brad Peters | 1 episode (1986) 1 episode (1990) |
| 1986 | The Monocled Mutineer | Wheelchair | 1 episode |
| 1987 | Coronation Street | Pete Jackson | 13 episodes |
| 1991 | The Bill | D.S. Dave Lindsay | 1 episode |
| 1993 | Cracker | D.C./D.S. George Giggs | 4 episodes |
| 1994 | Screen Two | Local Reporter Probation Officer | 1 episode (March) 1 episode (June) |
| 1994 | Peak Practice | "Clarkey" Clarke | 2 episodes |
| 1994 | Common As Muck | Guy Simmons | 6 episodes |
| 1995 | The Final Cut | Graham Glass | 1 episode |
| 1995–2000 | Coronation Street | Gary Mallett | 425 episodes, Series regular |
| 1996 | A Touch of Frost | P.C. Craven | 3 episodes |
| 2003 | Sweet Medicine | Tony Durston | 1 episode |
| 2006 | The Afternoon Play | Eddie Connolly | 1 episode |
| 2006 | Doctors | Billy Collis | 1 episode |
| 2007 | Doctors | Damien Giggs | 1 episode |
| 2007 | New Tricks | Paul Wilmslow | 1 episode |
| 2007 | Heartbeat | Ronald Kirby | 1 episode |
| 2007 | The Chase | D.I. Proctor | 1 episode |
| 2007 | The Street | Richard Watts | 2 episodes |
| 2009 | Red Riding: In the Year of Our Lord 1974 | Paul Bosker | TV movie |
| 2009 | Red Riding: In the Year of Our Lord 1983 | Paul Bosker | TV movie |
| 2009 | Holby City | Ken O'Dowd | 2 episodes |
| 2009 | Doctors | Lenny Aston | 1 episode |
| 2009 | Spanish Flu: The Forgotten Fallen | Stanford | TV movie |
| 2009 | Waking the Dead | Jason Bloch | 2 episodes |
| 2010 | Shameless | Roscoe | 2 episodes |
| 2010 | Lewis | Lester Garvey | 1 episode (Your Sudden Death Question) |
| 2011 | Doctors | George Arnott | 1 episode |
| 2012 | The Scapegoat | Fincher | TV movie |
| 2013 | Doctors | Jim Grove | 1 episode |
| 2014 | Scott & Bailey | Frankie Waddington | 1 episode |
| 2015 | Doctors | Andy Weston | 15 episodes |
| 2016 | Churchill's Secret | Sgt Murray | TV movie |
| 2016 | In the Club | Mickey | 2 episodes |
| 2022 | All Creatures Great and Small | Mr Sunningwell | S3 Ep5 |
| 2024 | The Listeners | Tom | 3 episodes |

== Theatre credits ==
| Year | Title | Role | Venue(s) |
|---|---|---|---|
| 2001–2002 | The York Realist | Arthur | The Lowry (15–17 November 2001); Theatre Royal, Bristol (20–24 November 2001); Royal Court Theatre (6 January-9 February 2002); Strand Theatre (8 March-20 April 2002) |
| 2019 | Calendar Girls | Rod | Theatre Royal, Norwich (15 February) |
