= Under Electric Clouds =

2015 film

- Film poster
- Directed by: Aleksei Alekseivich German
- Written by: Aleksei Alekseivich German
- Starring: Louis Franck
- Cinematography: Serhiy Mykhalchuk; Evgeniy Privin
- Release dates: 10 February 2015 (Berlin); 4 June 2015 (Russia)
- Running time: 138 minutes
- Countries: Russia; Ukraine; Poland
- Language: Russian

Under Electric Clouds (Russian: Pod electricheskimi oblakami, Под электрическими облаками) is a 2015 Russian sci-fi drama film directed by Aleksei Alekseivich German. It was screened in the main competition section of the 65th Berlin International Film Festival where it won the Silver Bear for Outstanding Artistic Contribution for Cinematography. It also earned German the award for Achievement in Directing at the 9th Asia Pacific Screen Awards.

== Cast ==
- Louis Franck as Petr
- Merab Ninidze as Nikolai
- Viktoria Korotkova as Sasha
- Chulpan Khamatova as Valya
- Viktor Bugakov as Danya
- Karim Pakachakov as Karim
- Konstantin Zeliger as Marat
- Anastasiya Melnikova as Irina
- Piotr Gasowski as Uncle Borya
