= Serhiy Mykhalchuk =

Ukrainian cinematographer (born 1972)

Serhiy Mykhalchuk Сергій Михальчук
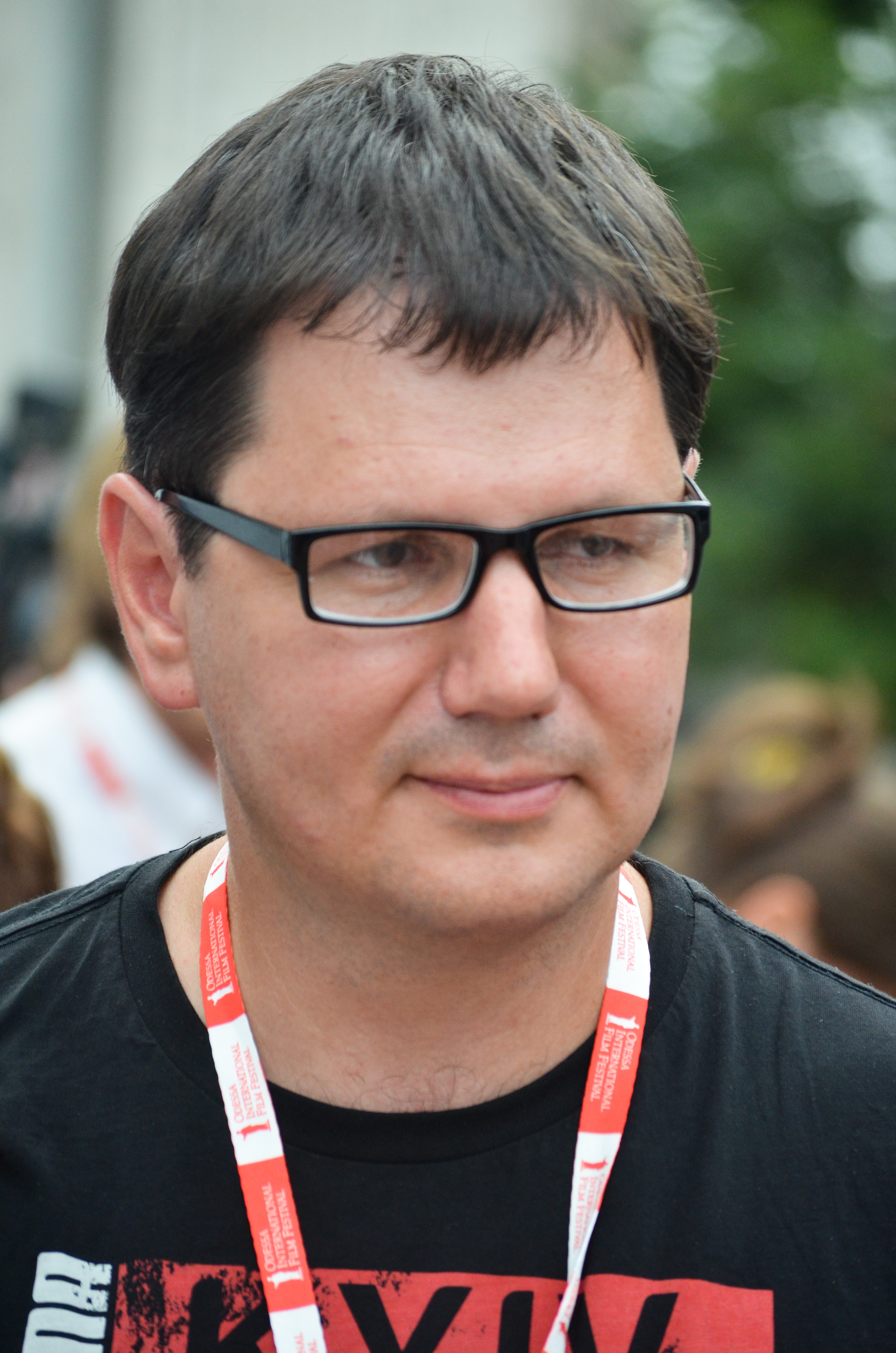
- Born: 13 July 1972 (age 54); Lutsk, Ukrainian SSR, Soviet Union
- Occupation: Cinematographer

Serhiy Mykhalchuk (Ukrainian: Сергій Михальчук; born 13 July 1972, in Lutsk) is a Ukrainian cinematographer. He graduated in 1994 from the Kyiv Theater Institute of Karpenko-Karyj. In addition to film work, Mykhalchuk has also produced documentaries and television feature films, music videos, and advertising features.

== Films ==
- 2000 – Zakon (The Law) (directed by Aleksandr Veledinsky, Russia)
- 2002 – Lubovnik (The Lover) (directed by Valeri Todorovsky, Russia)
- 2003 – Mamay (directed by Oles Sanin, Ukraine) Oscar nominee of Ukraine
- 2004 – Moy svodnyy brat Frankenshteyn (directed by Valeri Todorovsky, Russia)
- 2005 – Contact (directed by Andrej Novoselov, Russia)
- 2006 – I.D. (directed by Ghassan Shmeit, Syria)
- 2008 – Las Meninas (directed by Ihor Podolchak, Ukraine)
- 2008 – Illusion of Fear (directed by Oleksandr Kirienko, Ukraine)
- 2014 – The Guide
- 2015 – Under Electric Clouds
- 2019 – V.Silvestrov (directed by Serhii Bukovskyi, Ukraine)

== Awards ==
- 1999 – Lyubit kino (Love Cinema) film festival, Lumiere Brothers silver medal.
- 2002 – San Sebastian International Film Festival, Best Photography award, for Lubovnik
- 2003 – Open Film Festival Kinoshock, Best Cinematographer, for Mamay
- 2014 – Odesa International Film Festival, Best Cinematography, for The Guide
- 2015 – Berlin International Film Festival, Silver Berlin Bear, for Under Electric Clouds
