= Starting Out (British TV series) =

UK Educational Video Series from 1973-1992

Titlecard from the 1982 series

Starting Out is the title of seven series of programmes made for British schools by ATV and Central from 1973 to 1992. The writers included Catherine Storr, Dave Simpson, Anthony Horowitz and Grazyna Monvid. Comprising 56 episodes in total, the series were repeated until 1994.

The episodes were designed for older pupils who were about to leave school and who would soon be starting out on life as adults. A new series was made roughly every three years and was totally unrelated to that which came before, so that it was self-contained and relevant to the needs of each new generation of pupils. Several of the series were first broadcast late at night for preview by an adult audience, sometimes months before they were available to pupils.

The cast across the seven series included Joanna Lumley, Kirsten Hughes, John Savident, Kevin Lloyd, Rolf Saxon, Katharine Levy, Chris Gascoyne, Hywel Williams-Ellis, Nicholas Bond-Owen, Amanda Noar, Nick Conway, Perry Cree, David Nunn, Carol Chell, Rebecca Lacey and Ian Mercer.

Scripts from four episodes of the third series by Monvid were published as Choices: Four Plays from ITV's 'Starting Out' Series in 1986, (reprinted as Challenges: Four Plays from ITV's 'Starting Out' Series (Heinemann Floodlights) 1988), while scripts from the 1989 series by Horowitz were published as Starting Out.

== Series ==
- Series 1 (1973) written by Catherine Storr — 10 episodes about three girls, their boyfriends and their brothers
- Series 2 (1976) written by Catherine Storr — 10 episodes about a group of teenagers who meet a young man who is on probation.
- Series 3 (1980) written by Ben Steed, Dave Simpson and Sheila Yeger — 10 episodes about a teenage couple and their families, and the consequences of their actions.
- Series 4 (1982) written by Grazyna Monvid — 5 episodes about a step-family starting a new life in a new area.
- Series 5 (1986) written by Grazyna Monvid — 8 episodes about an inner-city youth club and the young people who go there.
- Series 6 (1989) written by Anthony Horowitz — 8 episodes about a family and the trouble that their son has got into.
- Series 7 (1992) written by Grazyna Monvid — 5 episodes about a boy and a girl who both run away from home for different reasons.
