= Grazyna Monvid =

British actress

Grazyna Monvid is a British actress, author and award-winning playwright.

As an actress Monvid has appeared in various British television dramas including The Liver Birds, Emmerdale Farm, Casualty, Game, Set and Match and Checking In, Checking Out.

In the 1980s, as a TV writer, she penned three series of ATV's schools series Starting Out, which starred Rolf Saxon, Ian Mercer, Joanna Lumley, Katharine Levy, Hywel Williams-Ellis, Amanda Noar and Kevin Lloyd, as well as episodes of Dramarama, A Change in Time, Scene and EastEnders (1991).

As a playwright Monvid's works include The Enemy Within and On Your Bike (1982) performed at the Belgrade Theatre in Coventry.

Monvid studied at the University of Sussex. In 1965 she married Michael J. Yates at Northampton in Northamptonshire.

== Publications ==
- Choices: Four Plays from ITV's Starting Out Series (Heinemann Floodlights) 1986 ISBN 0-435-23640-7
