= Dutch Girls =

1985 British television film

- Written by: William Boyd
- Directed by: Giles Foster
- Starring: Bill Paterson; Colin Firth; Timothy Spall; John Wells
- Music by: Ilona Sekacz
- Country of origin: United Kingdom
- Original language: English

Production
- Producers: Nick Elliott; Sue Birtwistle; Academy Entertainment
- Cinematography: Roger Pratt
- Editor: John Costelloe
- Running time: 83 minutes
- Production company: London Weekend Television

Original release
- Network: ITV
- Release: 24 November 1985

Dutch Girls is a 1985 film, released by the London Weekend Television Company, produced by Sue Birtwistle, directed by Giles Foster, and written by William Boyd. The film is about a group of teenage boys who go to the Netherlands to play hockey. On the trip they drink, smoke, and try to have sex with girls. It features several well-known actors who were young at the time — Colin Firth, Timothy Spall, Adrian Lukis and James Wilby.

== Cast ==
- Colin Firth as Neil Truelove
- Timothy Spall as Lyndon Baines Jellicoe
- Bill Paterson as Mr Mole
- James Wilby as Dundine
- Adrian Lukis as Murray
- Hywel Williams-Ellis as Lamb
- Gusta Gerritsen as Romelia
- Sylvia Millecam as Greetje
- Anne Wil Blankers as Mrs Van Der Merwe
- Colin McFarlane as Mkwela
- Erik Plooyer as Mr Van Der Merwe
- Richard Torn as Kees Van Der Merwe
- Stephanie Verwijmeren as Anna Van Der Merwe
