= Return to Waterloo =

Studio album by Ray Davies
- Released: 1 July 1985
- Studio: Konk Studios, London
- Genre: Rock
- Length: 27:59
- Label: Arista
- Producer: Ray Davies

Ray Davies chronology
Return to Waterloo (1985)	The Storyteller (1998)

Professional ratings
Review scores
Source	Rating
Allmusic	link

Return to Waterloo is the debut solo album by Kinks' leader and chief songwriter Ray Davies. Three of the tracks (tracks 3, 4 and 5) on the album release were also available in near-identical form on The Kinks' 1984 release Word of Mouth. All of The Kinks appear on the album with the exception of Dave Davies. According to Ray Davies, Dave Davies refused to perform on the album. He later said, "Dave refused to play and so it had to be 'Ray Davies and members of the Kinks'. If he had worked with me on it, it would have been a great record, but he let me down."

An hour-long musical film, Return to Waterloo, was also written and directed by Davies, wherein instead of dialogue, the story is told through music and lyrics. The film features Tim Roth, Kenneth Colley, Valerie Holliman, Dominique Barnes, and (briefly) Ray Davies himself. One song which appears in the film but not on the soundtrack is "Ladder of Success".

== Track listing ==
All tracks are written by Ray Davies

No.	Title	Length
1.	"Intro"	0:56
2.	"Return to Waterloo"	4:40
3.	"Going Solo"	3:55
4.	"Missing Persons"	2:53
5.	"Sold Me Out"	3:19
6.	"Lonely Hearts"	3:05
7.	"Not Far Away"	4:23
8.	"Expectations"	4:06
9.	"Voices In the Dark (End Title)"	4:22
Total length:		27:59

== Personnel ==
- Ray Davies – vocals, guitar, piano, synthesizer, gong, sound effects
- Ian Gibbons – synthesizer, keyboards, drum and percussion programming, backing vocals
- Louisa Davies – vocals "girl's voice"
- Valerie Hollerman – spoken word "woman station announcer"
- Jim Rodford – bass guitar, backing vocals
- Mick Avory – drums
- Robert Henrit – drums; extra percussion on "Voices in the Dark (End Title)"
- John O'Donnell – extra percussion on "Voices in the Dark (End Title)"

Technical

- Damian Korner, David Baker – engineer
