= Amanda Noar =

British actress (born 1962)

- Born: 14 October 1962 (age 64); Prestwich, Lancashire, England
- Occupations: Actress, Director & Choreographer
- Years active: 1980–present
- Spouses: Neil Morrissey (m. 1987; div. 1991) Emir Guleryuz (m. 1998)
- Children: 3

Amanda Noar (born 14 October 1962) is a British actress and the former wife of actor Neil Morrissey.

== Biography ==
Born in Prestwich, Lancashire, Noar attended the Arts Educational School from the age of 12. At age 16, she started her professional career in the Danny La Rue Show. She was later cast as Anita in the West End production of West Side Story. Her first television role was as Helen Carson in the ATV schools series Starting Out (1982), written by Grazyna Monvid. Her other TV work includes Julie Clay in Coronation Street (1983), Sally in Boon (1987), Natasha Glendenning in Lovejoy (1992), Norma in Stay Lucky (1993), Melanie Norriss in Casualty (1994), Rose Finnigan in Brookside (1999) and Letitia in Hollyoaks.

Stage roles include Anita in West Side Story at Her Majesty's Theatre in London and on national tour, Fields of Ambrosia at the Aldwych Theatre, London, and Chava in Fiddler on the Roof with Topol. In addition, Noar played Gypsy in Gypsy at The Grand Theatre, Swansea, and Hunyak in Chicago at The Haymarket Theatre in Leicester. She performed in Godspell on national tour, as well as roles in Sweet Charity and Cabaret. Her film work includes playing "Jess", a dancing alien, in Return of the Jedi (1983), Out on the Floor (1983), The Zero Option (1988), Kim in the comedy horror film I Bought a Vampire Motorcycle (1990) opposite husband Neil Morrissey, and The Frontline (1993).

Noar is of Jewish parentage and was married to actor Neil Morrissey from 1987 to 1991 and with him she had a son, Sam Morrissey, born in 1989. She has a son and daughter from her second marriage, to Emir Guleryuz, a trader in London whom she met on a blind date.

Noar is also the producer/director of the North London musical theatre company "Impact" which has put on many shows including Fiddler on the Roof, Oliver! and The Producers. The proceeds of these shows go to various charities.

Noar has directed many shows at Upstairs at the Gatehouse in Highgate, including “You’re A Good Man Charlie Brown”, Stephen Sondheim’s “Road Show” and “Pippin”. She also coaches at many drama schools including LSMT, Central and Goldsmiths university.

Noar won The Sylvia Anderson Award for Creativity for her direction on "The Clay Kickers Chorus" in 2018.
