= Hywel Williams-Ellis =

British actor

Hywel Williams-Ellis, sometimes billed as Hywel Williams Ellis, is a British actor who was active in the 1980s and 1990s.

Williams-Ellis' first television appearance was in the episode 'Days' of BBC2 Playhouse in 1981. He played Honesty Evans in thirteen episodes of the HTV series Smuggler (1981), which starred Oliver Tobias. He played Stewart in ATV's Starting Out (1982), a series for schools written by Grazyna Monvid. He reprised the role in one episode of the 1986 series by the same writer. Also in 1982 he appeared in I Remember Nelson for Central Television, while in 1984 he acted in Return to Waterloo, a television film made by Channel 4.

He played the role of Lamb in the television film Dutch Girls (1985), which starred Colin Firth and Timothy Spall, and appeared in three episodes of Dramarama between 1983 and 1985, playing a different character in each. Williams-Ellis played Herr Schmidt in Constant Hot Water (1986), and made an appearance in C.A.T.S. Eyes, also in 1986.

Williams-Ellis played a waiter in The Cook the Thief His Wife & Her Lover (1989), which starred Helen Mirren and Michael Gambon, and Barry Evans in an episode of Boon (1990).
