= Return to Waterloo (film) =

- U.S theatrical release poster
- Directed by: Ray Davies
- Written by: Ray Davies
- Produced by: Dennis Woolf
- Starring: Tim Roth; Kenneth Colley; Claire Parker
- Cinematography: Roger Deakins
- Edited by: David Mingay
- Music by: Ray Davies; Mick Avory; Jim Rodford; Ian Gibbons
- Production company: RCA Video Productions
- Distributed by: Channel 4 (United Kingdom TV)
- Release dates: 2 November 1984 (United Kingdom); 17 May 1985 (United States)
- Running time: 58 minutes
- Country: United Kingdom
- Language: English

Return to Waterloo is a 1984 British musical film written and directed by Ray Davies, and starring Tim Roth, Kenneth Colley and Claire Parker. The film shows the journey of a commuter from Guildford to Waterloo in London.

== Cast ==
- Kenneth Colley as The Traveller
- Tim Roth as Punk
- Claire Parker as Walkman Girl
- Ray Davies as Subway Singer
- Sue Vanner as Sexy Girl
- Michael Fish as Weather Forecaster
- Hywel Williams Ellis as Young Businessman
- Michael Cule as Fat Businessman
- Christopher Godwin as Thin Businessman
- Timothy Davies as Father at Horsley Station
- Joan Blackham as Mother at Horsley Station
- Myrtle Devenish as Blind Lady
- Claire Rayner as Agony Aunt
- Gretchen Franklin as Gossip Woman
- Nat Jackley as Old Soldier
- Roy Evans as Mortuary Assistant

== Production ==
The soundtrack was provided by members of The Kinks, who released an album Return to Waterloo in connection with it albeit without lead guitarist Dave Davies who refused to participate, hence the album being credited solely to Ray Davies. The film's cinematographer, Roger Deakins, would receive great acclaim in British and American film working with the Coen brothers and Sam Mendes.

== Release ==
The movie was intended for television, and was shown as such on Channel 4 in the United Kingdom on 4 November 1984. In the United States of America, the film was picked up by New Line Cinema and released theatrically on 17 May 1985, premiering at the Waverly in New York City.
