= Las Meninas (film) =

2008 film

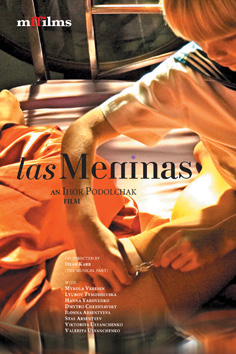
- Theatrical release poster
- Directed by: Ihor Podolchak; Dean Karr
- Written by: Ihor Podolchak
- Produced by: Ihor Podolchak; Liliya Mlynarych; Ihor Dyurych; Tamara Podolchak
- Starring: Mykola Veresen; Lyubov Tymoshevska; Hanna Yarovenko
- Cinematography: Serhiy Mykhalchuk
- Edited by: Ihor Podolchak
- Music by: Alexander Shchetynsky
- Distributed by: Ihor Podolchak, Ukraine; Insomnia World Sales
- Release dates: January 25, 2008 (Rotterdam Int. Film Festival); October 5, 2009 (Ukraine)
- Running time: 99 minutes
- Country: Ukraine
- Language: Ukrainian
- Budget: 850 000 $

Las Meninas (Spanish for The Maids of Honour, Ukrainian: «Меніни», romanized: Meniny) is a 2008 Ukrainian film directed by Ihor Podolchak. Its title alludes to the well-known painting by Diego Velázquez, Las Meninas. Ihor Podolchak was the producer, screenwriter, and director of this film. Las Meninas was produced by MF Films (a subdivision of Masoch Fund). It was the first Ukrainian film to participate in the Tiger Awards Competition of the International Film Festival Rotterdam. As of the beginning of 2011, the film has participated in 27 international film festivals, including 10 competition programs. In 2011, it was included in Top 15 Best Ukrainian films of the 20 years' Independence period.

…Podolchak's film, alongside Majewski's and Bartas's work, appears to be a perfect example for a cinematic or post-cinematic "dream of a gesture" (Agamben 1993, 139) transporting the viewer into a visibly subjective and surreal universe of enigmatic pictures….

== Plot ==
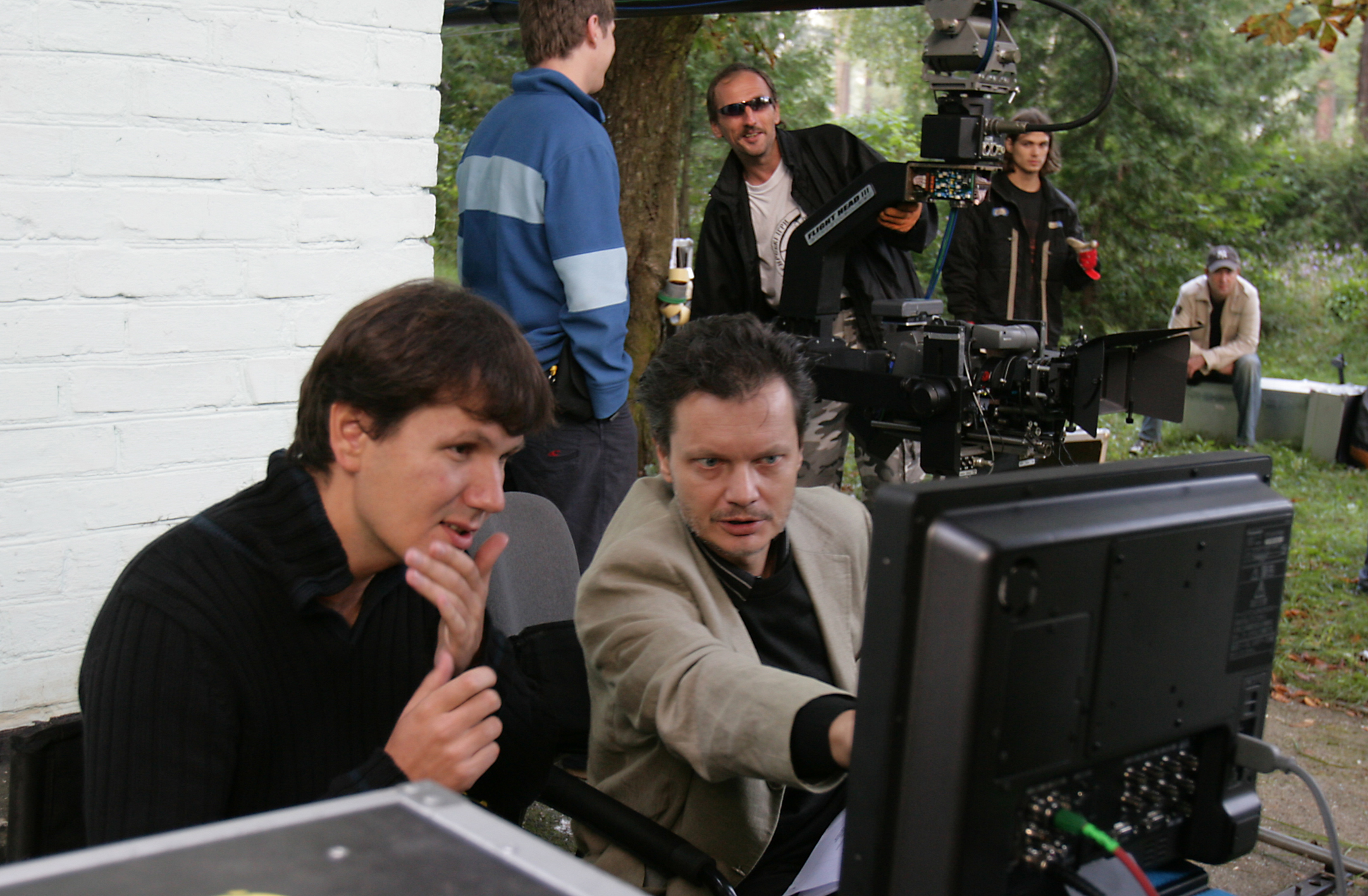
Serhiy Mykhalchuk (DoP, left) and Ihor Podolchak. Movie set. 2006

The film is about what the routine of everyday life can do to the human mind and psyche. It also reflects on the importance of the choices we make and how limited these choices are in the first place. The plot evolves around a family of four. They live in the suburbs, in a strange villa that appears, through a complex game of mirrors, to be more like a piece of installation art than a real house. The main character, who hardly appears on screen, is the son, a man in his thirties. Suffering from asthma and eczema since childhood, he uses his condition to manipulate his parents and his sister. Thus the existence of the terrorized family turns into an endless ritual of attempting to satisfy his whims, and always on the alert for yet another one of his "health crises". Las Meninas resembles the scattered pieces of a puzzle. It is up to the viewer to assemble them in order to form his very own picture – something that makes the film itself personal and unique.

== Cast ==
- Mykola Veresen as Father, Second Father, Young Father
- Lyubov Tymoshevska as Mother
- Hanna Yarovenko as Daughter
- Dmytro Chernyavsky as Son
- Ilona Arsentyeva as Daughter (girl)
- Stas Arsentyev as Son (boy)
- Viktoriya Ulyanchenko as Young Mother
- Valeriya Ulyanchenko as Young Mother

== Production ==
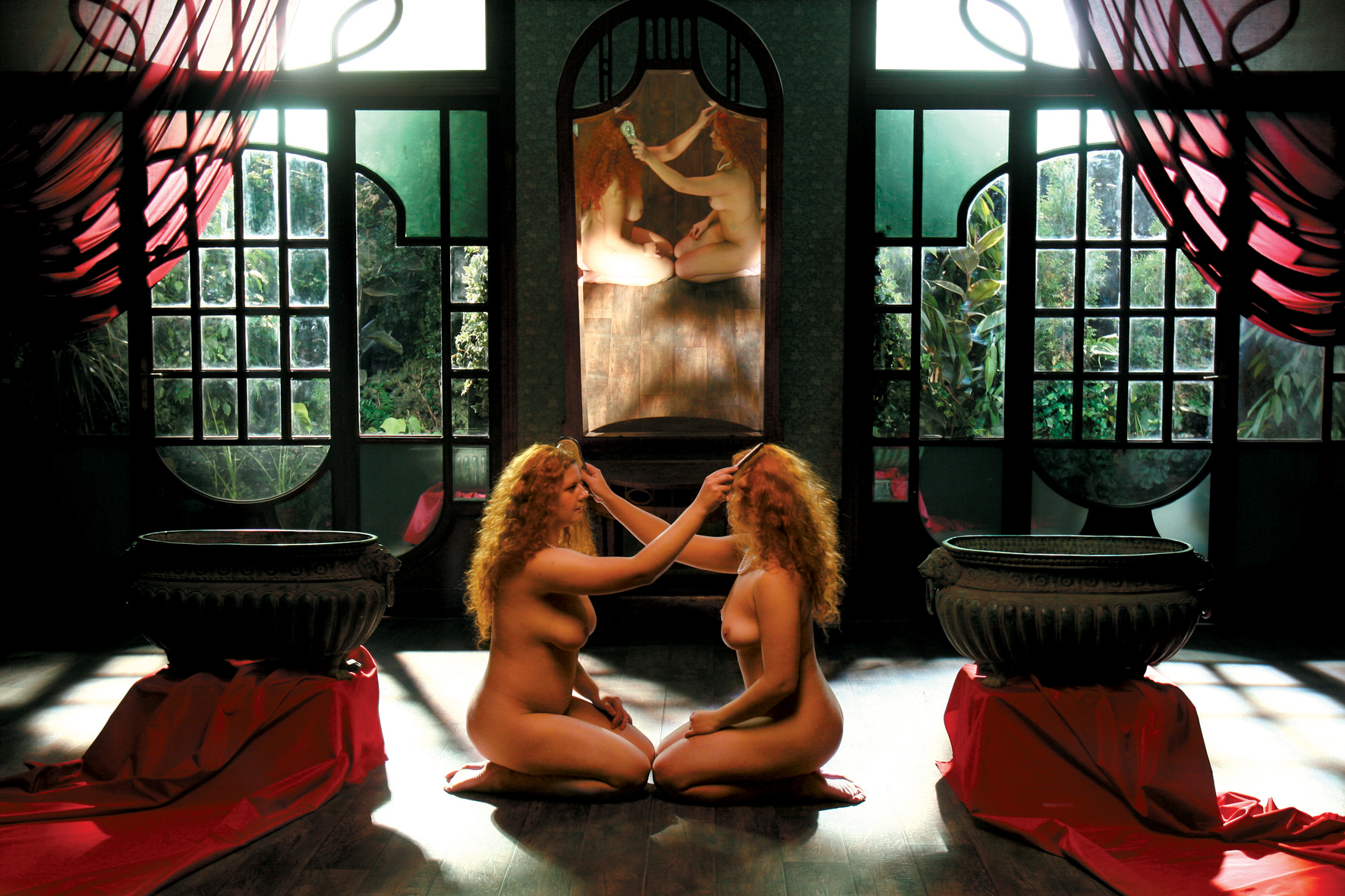
Still

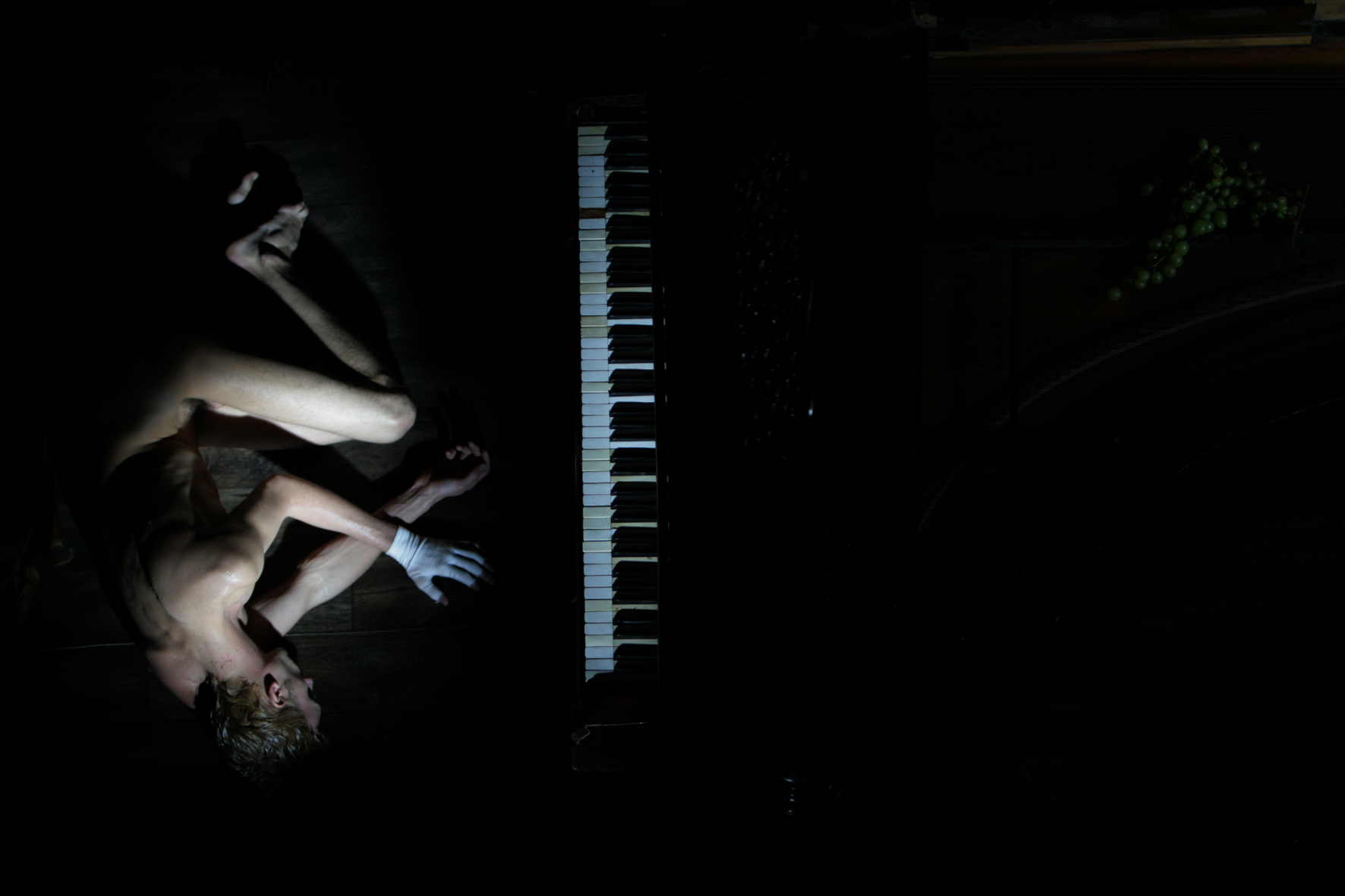
Still

The idea for the script appeared in 2004, inspired by Doctor Janos Sanocky's account of a case from his medical practice. The dialogue was co-written by the Lithuanian-Russian writer Andrey Levkin. The shooting of the film took place between September 15 and October 24, 2006, in Kyiv. Most of the film was shot through mirrors, which caused serious difficulties for the director of photography, since there was a permanent challenge for the crew to avoid getting into the shot. Editing, effects, color correction, and rendering of the film took 14 months. All post-production work except for rendering was done by Ihor Podolchak himself. Las Meninas was the first feature film in Ukraine created entirely with the digital intermediate process. Most of the music in the film was written for cello and piano by composer Alexander Shchetynsky. Director and composer paid attention to the central role of music as a semantic counterpoint to the dialogue and visual imagery, so the sound level of the film can be viewed as an integral sound installation. American video clip director Dean Karr co-directed the music part of the film.

== Releases and Reception ==
Las Meninas had a world premiere at the International Film Festival Rotterdam on January 25, 2008. During 2008–2011, the film participated in competition programs of the international film festivals in Brazil, Croatia, Russia, Poland, Slovakia, Spain, Romania, Italy, and Hungary; in non-competition programs in Germany, South Korea, France, Australia, Greece, UK, Colombia, Estonia, USA, Sweden, and South Africa. It was also included in the official selections of the Moscow International Film Festival and the Karlovy Vary International Film Festival.

The critics noted the film's "beautiful imagery" and praised the camerawork of Serhiy Mykhalchuk. Ukrainian premiere of the film took place on June 9, 2009 at the Festival of the European Cinema in Kyiv. Theatrical release in Ukraine was on October 5, 2009. The film received mixed reviews in Ukraine. The critical opinions were polarized – from aversion and accusations of being "artificial" to apologetics and high appreciation of the film's art quality and its break with the tradition of the so-called "Ukrainian Soviet cinema".

== Sources ==
- Flashback. Українське медіа-мистецтво 1990-х. Ukrainian media art of the 1990s. Catalog. Curators: Oleksandr Solovyov, Solomiya Savchuk. Київ: ДП НКММК Мистецький Арсенал, 2018. — 180 p. pp 16, 24, 40-41, 117 ISBN 978-966-97778-1-2 (in Ukrainian)
- International Film Guide 2009: the definitive annual review of world cinema, edited by Haydn Smith. 45th Edition. London & New York: Wallflower Press 2009 ISBN 978-1-905674-99-2
- Pethő, Ágnes. The Cinema of Sensations. Cambridge: Cambridge Scholars Publishing, 2015, pp. 155–182, ISBN 978-1-4438-6883-9, ISBN 1-4438-6883-3
- Бейкер Марія. Роттердам смотрит кино из Украины и Казахстана., Радіо BBC, 23 января 2008 (in Russian)
- Космолінська Наталка. Ігор Подольчак, Ігор Дюрич: У тому, що Україну представлятимуть галичани, є історична справедливість., „Поступ/Брама“ — No. 28(686) (in Ukrainian)
- Корниенко C. Las Meninas. Очень авторский фильм. svobodanews.ru, 19.02.08 (in Russian)
- Куровець, О. Las Meninas: „Обережно, артхаус!“», «Телекритика», 15-06-2009 (in Ukrainian)
- Купінська, А. Десять українських фільмів до річниці незалежності, life.pravda.com.ua, 24.08.2011 (in Ukrainian)
- Ложкина, А. Я мало думаю о зрителе «Top10», Sep., 2009 (in Russian)
- Плахов Андрій. Роттердамские угодники. «Коммерсантъ», No. 16/П(3833), 04.02.2008 (in Russian)
- Шпилюк А. Игорь Подольчак покоряет голландские высоты. «Коммерсант Украина», No. 8 от 23.01.2008, СР (in Russian)
