= Delirium (2013 film) =

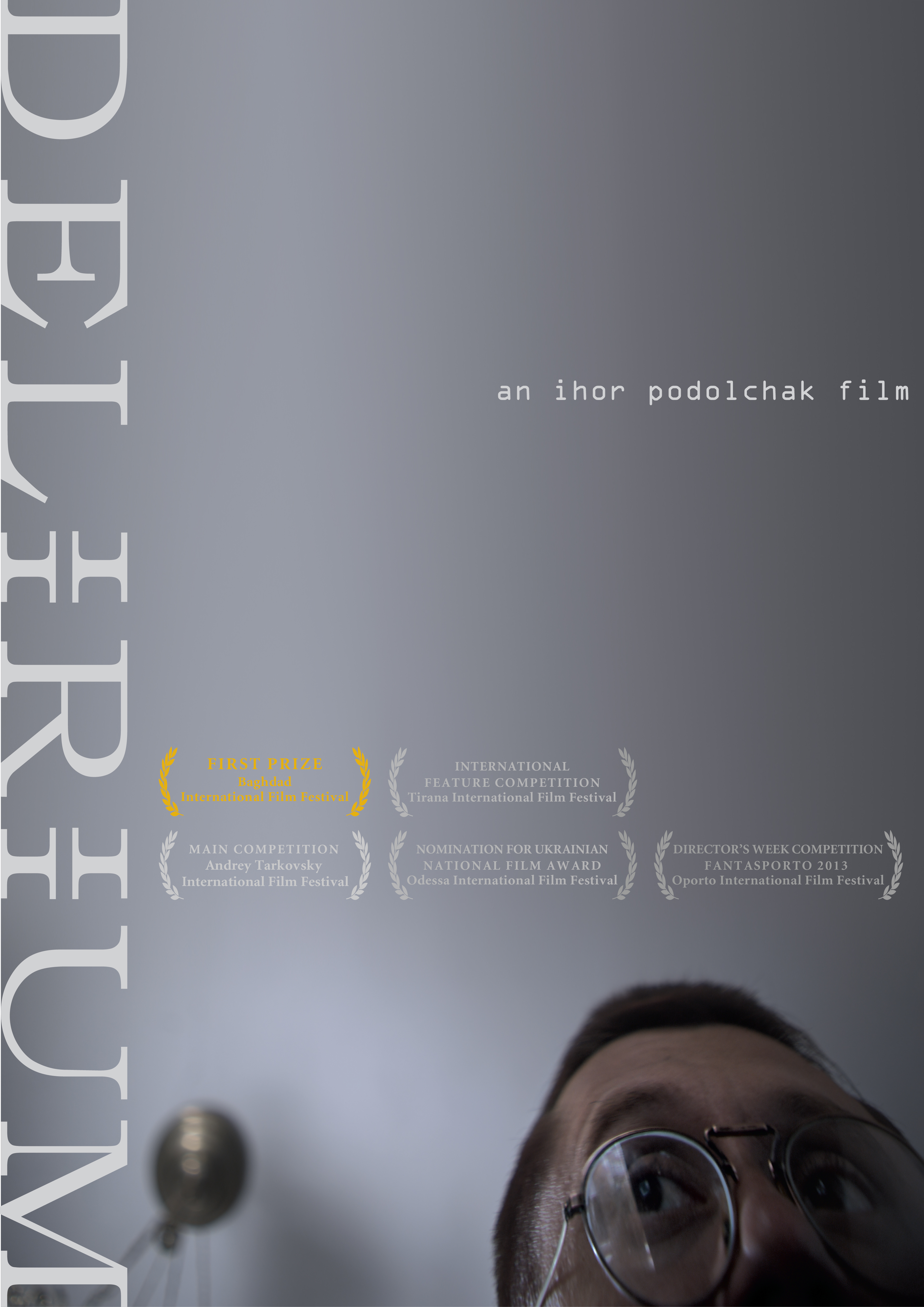
- Theatrical release poster
- Directed by: Ihor Podolchak
- Written by: Ihor Podolchak
- Produced by: Ihor Podolchak; Ihor Dyurych; Tamara Podolchak; Liliya Mlynarych
- Starring: Volodymyr Khimyak; Lesya Voynevych; Petro Rybka
- Cinematography: Mykola Yefymenko
- Edited by: Ihor Podolchak
- Music by: Alexander Shchetynsky
- Production companies: MF Films; Podolchak Films; Paulus von Lemberg
- Distributed by: Ihor Podolchak
- Release date: March 4, 2013 (Fantasporto)
- Running time: 96/100 minutes
- Country: Ukraine
- Language: Ukrainian
- Budget: 850,000 €

Delirium is a 2013 Ukrainian psychological drama film produced and directed by Ihor Podolchak, premiered in Director's Week Competition in Fantasporto (Portugal, 2013), awarded with the "First Prize" at Baghdad International Film Festival (2013).

Delirium is the second Podolchak feature film. The screenplay is based on the novel Inductor by Ukrainian writer Dmytro Belyansky.

== Plot ==
A family asks a young psychiatrist to be their guest for a while and help look after their father who's developed a suicidal fixation for ropes and knots among other things. It is also possible that the mental health of the guest is the real cause for concern.

== Cast ==
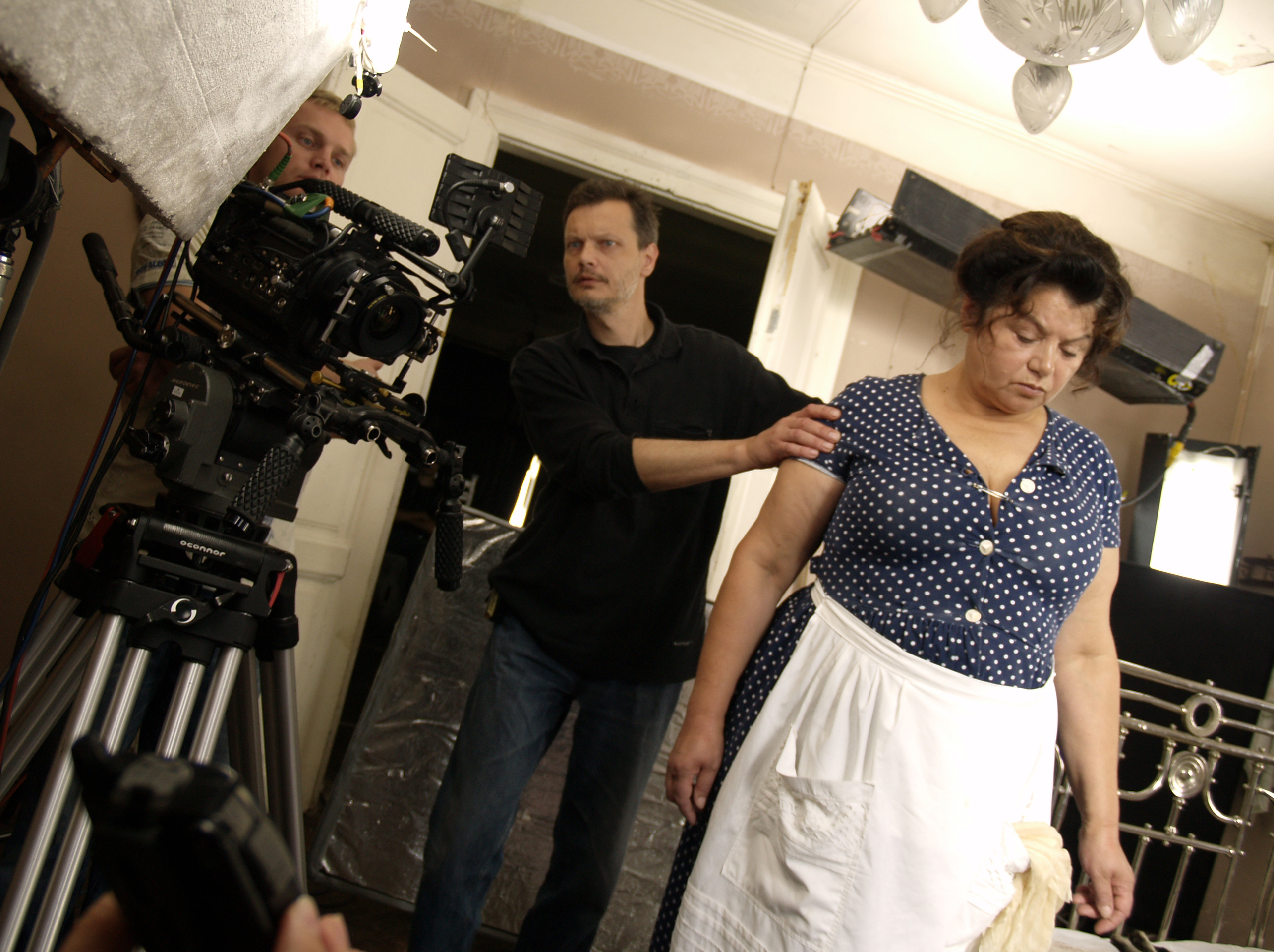
Mykola Yefymenko (DOP), Ihor Podolchak and Lesya Voynevych (Mother) at the movie set. 2008

- Volodymyr Khimyak as Guest, Psychiatrist
- Lesya Voynevych as Mother
- Petro Rybka as Father, Professor
- Olha Horbach as Daughter
- Olha Bakus as Maid
- Vasyl Kostenko as Son, Son in Law
- Ivan Kostenko as Priest

== Production ==
Work on the script had begun in the spring of 2008 and was completed on the eve of filming. The director's development and preparatory period were financially supported by the Hubert Balls Foundation (The Netherlands). In search of locations for filming, the film group carried out a long expedition on the Carpathians and Transcarpathians of Ukraine. The first stage of filming took place from August 1 to September 15, 2008, in the suburbs of Lviv - Briukhovychi and Horodok, the second stage was held in Kyiv in late 2009 - early 2010. In total. The shooting was conducted on a digital Red One camera. Almost the whole film, with the exception of the first and last scene, was shot with the help of the Tilt- Shift lenses, which made it possible to create a specific image with uneven focus distribution along the frame, plane and various geometric distortions of the frame content. In the scene, which was filmed in Gorodok church, an Oscar-winning Garmoshka crane and a gyrostabilized panoramic head Flight Head of the renowned Ukrainian company Filmotechnik were used.

Editing, color correction, and sound design were made on Apple hardware and Apple software: Final Cut Studio, and Logic Pro. Visual effects were made in Adobe After Effects. The sounds from the set were not used. The voices of three male characters - the Father, the Guest, the Son - was performed by the Kyiv actor Vitaly Linetsky. The sound design of the film was performed by well-known Ukrainian musician and TV showman - Miroslav Kuvaldin. The final edition of the sound was made by Igor Podolchak and Igor Durych in 2011.

== Music ==
The score was written and performed by Alexander Schetinsky. Initially, the director and composer planned to use the traditional musical genre Dies irae, which is part of the Catholic Mass. Were written six completed instrumental parts, named according to the sections of the Latin mass: Dies irae, Quantus tremor, Mors stupebit, Ingemisco, Tuba mirum, Lacrimosa.

The composer limited himself to the means of the symphony orchestra and did not use any text or vocals. The music does not contain direct illustrations, and, in particular, thanks to avant-garde style techniques, paradoxically combined with names, appealing to the surrealism principles, which fully corresponded to the aesthetics of the film. However, during the work the authors decided to use only two musical parts - Mors stupebit at the beginning of the film (initial titles) and Dies irae on the final credits.

During the unfolding of the film, music does not sound at all. Thanks to this, the initial and final musical fragments acquired additional dramatic significance: an introduction to the "problematic" of the film (the effect of tuning on the corresponding aesthetic "wave") and a semantic generalization.

== Interpretations ==
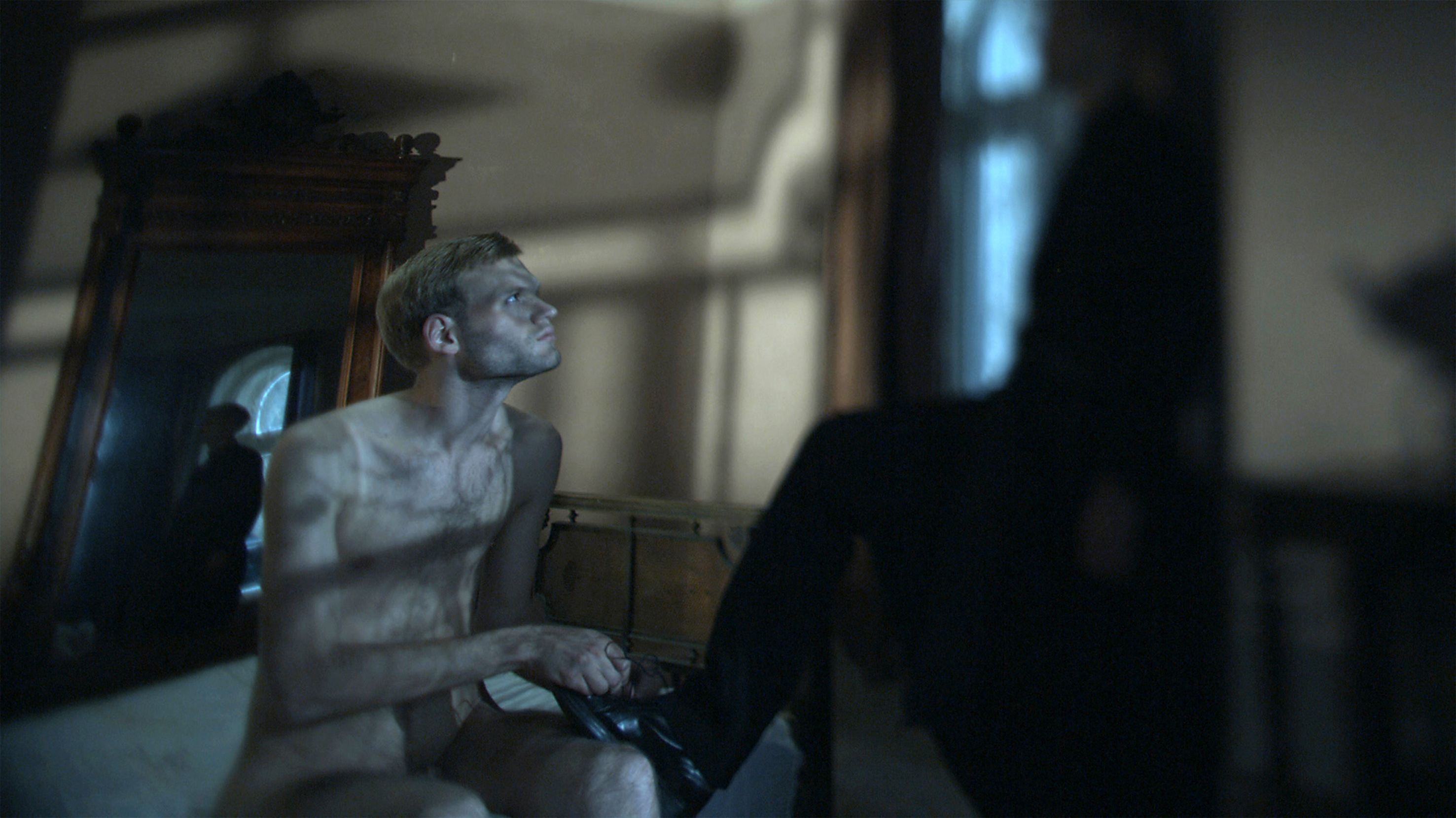
Still

Like in his first film Las Meninas, Deliriu appeals to the intricate family sagas, which appear in the novels by Witold Gombrowicz, Milorad Pavić, and Bruno Schulz. Unlike the sagas Luchino Visconti (The Damned) or Ingmar Bergman (Fanny and Alexander), Podol'chak avoids narrative but everything happens outside the space-time continuum with a focus on psychological states. His characters are arbitrary, which is emphasized by archetypal names: Father, Mother, Daughter.

Developing the themes set in his first film Las Meninas, Podolchak in Delirium somewhat modifies the "family" structure - introduces into the hermetic nightmare the "other" character - the person from the side. But this "stranger" (the main character is the Psychiatrist, a kind of heir to the narrator from The Fall of the House of Usher by Edgar Allan Poe) shows himself not as an alien body. His invasion does not cause any changes in the "family organism". The family absorbs the "alien", turning him into a full participant of a strange game, the exit of which does not exist.

From the point of view of cinematic genres, more accurately subgenres, Delirium can be attributed to the so-called "stories about the house with no way out" or "stories of houses with ghosts." From the films of the first category, the closest is Singapore Sling and See You in Hell, My Darling by Nikos Nikolaidis. From the films of the second category, The House on Telegraph Hill by Robert Wise and The Others by Alejandro Amenábar. But unlike the films by Wise and Amenabar, in Podolchak's Delirium the spectator encounters the concept of "erroneous suspense" when the director seems to create an atmosphere of anxious anticipation, but these premonitions of something terrible are being destroyed by the characters' inadequate reaction on them.

Suspense, performed by Podolchak, is self-destructing. It has no point of view "from the outside", there is no coordinate of "normality", relating to which the viewer is able to oppose herself/himself to screen suspense. The viewer becomes this obscurity. Thus Podolchak provokes a feeling of acute claustrophobia - there is no way out from Podolchak's "home-world". The spectator, like the characters, does not know is there anything beyond the boundaries of the place where she/he is at the moment. Since "this moment" has the ability to loop, then the flight "from here" becomes simply impossible.

== Awards and nominations ==
=== Awards ===
- 2013 - First Prize. Baghdad International Film Festival, Iraq

=== Nominations ===
- 2013 - Best Director Award. Fantasporo, 33rd Oporto International Film Festival. Porto, Portugal
- 2013 - National Ukrainian Film Award". Odesa International Film Festival. Ukraine
- 2013 - Grand-Prix. Zerkalo, Tarkovsky International Film Festival. Ples, Russia
- 2013 - Prize. Tirana International Film Festival. Albania

== Literature and sources ==
- International Film Guide 2010: the definitive annual review of world cinema, edited by Haydn Smith. 46th Edition. London & New York: Wallflower Press, 2010, p. 298 ISBN 978-1-906660-38-3
- Nogueira, C. Fantasporto 2013 - dia 4, O Cinéfilo Invertebrado 05.03.201. Retrieved March 22, 2013
- «В Португалии состоится мировая премьера украинского фильма «Delirium», 20хвилин, 20 лютого, 2013. Retrieved March 7, 2013
- «Игорь Подольчак: „Я хотел сделать фильм-бред“», . Retrieved July 18, 2012 (in Russian)
- Белянский, Д. Игорь Подольчак. Зеркало для Я, Art Ukraine, 5(24) вересень-жовтень. Retrieved July 18, 2012 (in Russian)
- Институт Горшенина. Мировая премьера украинского фильма DELIRIUM. LB.ua, 27 лютого 2013. Retrieved March 7, 2013 (in Russian)
- Олтаржевська, Л. У мене зараз інші пензлики. Україна молода, No. 030 за 26.02.2013. Retrieved March, 2013 (in Ukrainian)
- Підгороа-Ґвяздовский, Я. Художник і режисер Ігор Подольчак: «Свій новий фільм знімаю лише за власні гроші» «Дзеркало тижня», No. 37 (765) 3 — 9 жовтня 2009. Retrieved July 18, 2012 (in Ukrainian)
- Підгора-Ґвяздовський, Я. Фільтр для марень, Український тиждень. 1 жовтня, 2010. Retrieved July 18, 2012 (in Ukrainian)
- Підгора-Ґвяздовський, Я. Таблетка деліріуму, Що. 1-2, январь-февраль, 2012, стор. 22-31. Retrieved July 18, 2012 (in Ukrainian)
- Філатов, А. "Своїм фільмом "Delirium" хочу роздратувати глядача" - режисер Ігор Подольчак. Gazeta.ua, 22.02.2013. Retrieved March 7, 2013 (in Ukrainian)
- Що дивитися: нові українські фільми/DELIRIUM // Inspired — 17 жовтня 2014 (in Ukrainian)
