= Ihor Podolchak =

Ukrainian filmmaker and visual artist

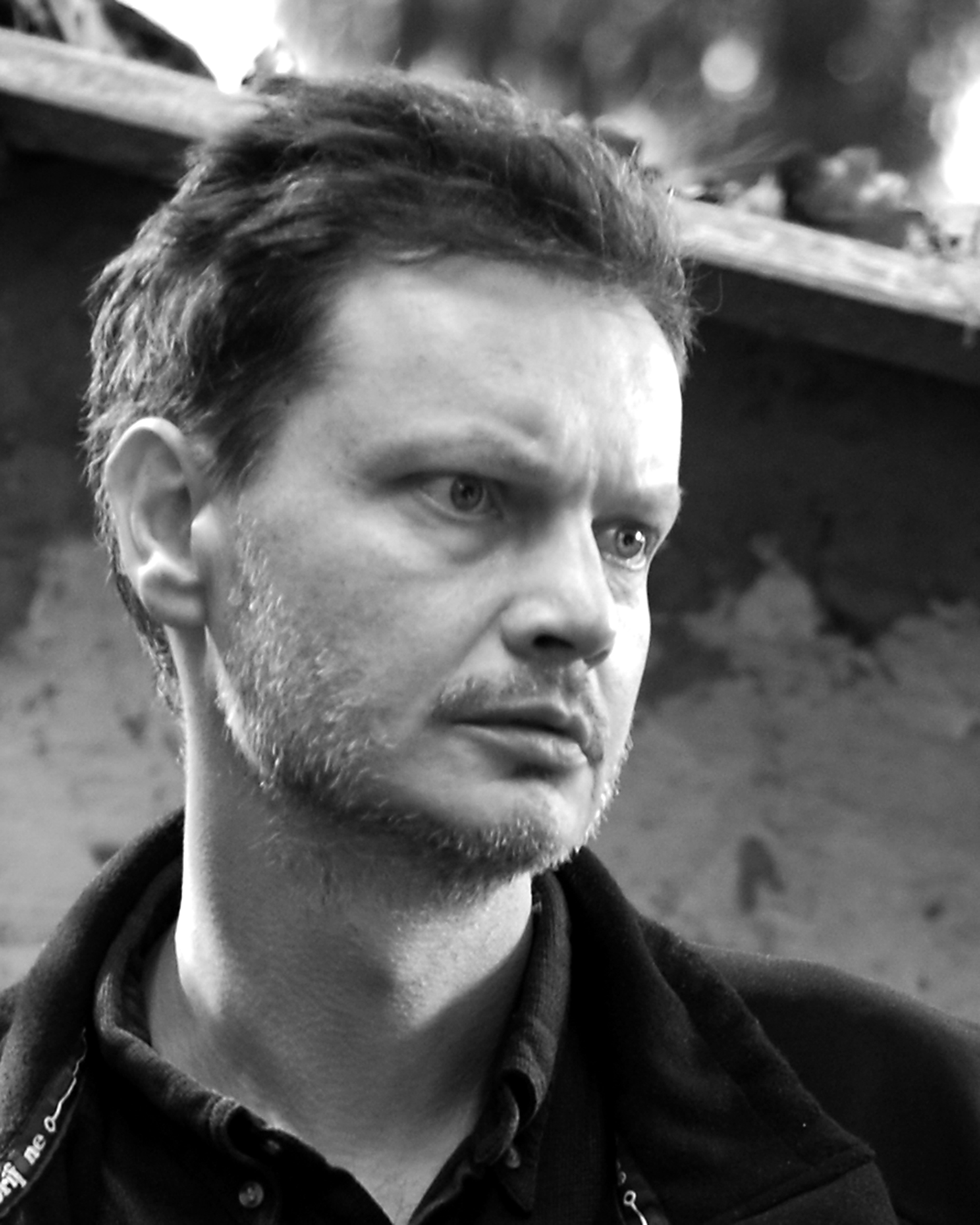
- Podolchak at the movie set Delirium 2008
- Born: April 9, 1962 (age 64); Lviv, Ukrainian SSR, USSR
- Education: The Lviv National Academy of Arts
- Occupations: Film director, screenwriter, producer, painter, printmaker, photographer
- Years active: 1984 – present
- Notable work: Las Meninas, Delirium
- Style: Nonlinear, Psychological, Surrealistic
- Spouse: Tamara Podolchak (1984-present)

Ihor Podolchak (Ukrainian: Ігор Подольчак; Polish: Ihor Podolczak; born April 9, 1962) is a Ukrainian filmmaker and visual artist. He is a co-founder of the creative association Masoch Fund, and a participant in the Ukrainian New Wave.

Ihor Podolchak was named as one of the 10 most prominent Ukrainian filmmakers by Forbes Ukraine in 2014, and is a member of the Ukrainian Film Academy.

== Biography ==
Podolchak was born in Lviv, Ukrainian SSR, USSR (now Ukraine). He graduated from Lviv Academy of Fine Arts (then Lviv State Institute of Applied and Decorative Arts) with distinction in 1984. From 1984 to 1985 he served in the Soviet Border Troops on the Soviet-Polish border.

From 1985 to 1986 he worked in the Art Fund of the Union of Artists of Ukraine. Since 1986, he has been a free artist and curator of contemporary art. He has also been a participant and laureate of numerous international exhibitions, organized and held in various international exhibitions across Ukraine, Russia, the US, and Norway. After completing his military service, he founded Production Center ltd, a company engaged in film production, creating series projects for Ukrainian and Russian TV channels.

After establishing the Masoch Fund, together with Igor Durich, he actively conducted various artistic projects in Ukraine, Russia, Poland and in Germany. Since 1997, he has been engaged in the integrated design of the visual-image components of political election campaigns in both Ukraine and Russia. Since 2006, he has written, scripted, shot, and produced movies such as:

- Las Meninas – 2008, full length, Ukraine
- Delirium – 2013, full length, Ukraine, Czech Republic
- Merry-Go-Round – 2017, short length, Ukraine, Poland

== Visual arts ==
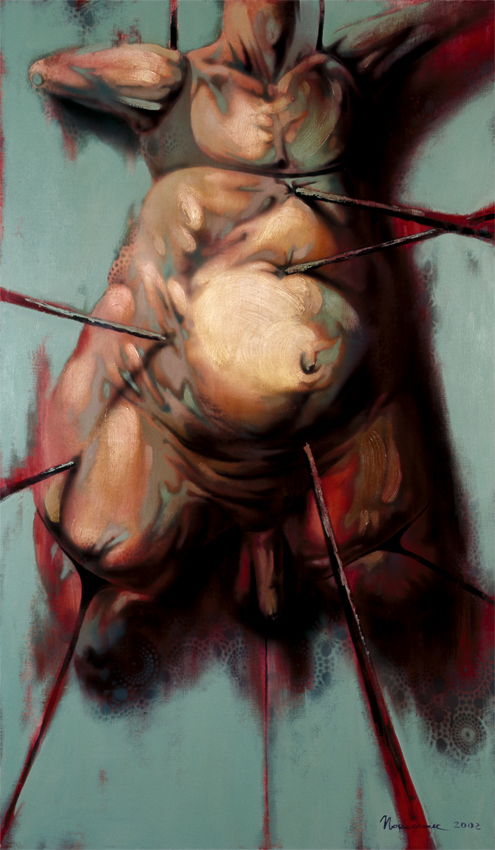
S. S. 2002, acrylic on canvas, 75х130 cm

Podolchak works in different genres of fine art – painting, prints, photography, video art and art actions. At the beginning of his career, the graphics prevailed, and from the mid-1990s makes art actions and performances, from the late 1990s video art.

In the center of Podolchak's creativity, is a human body in its various manifestations, relationships with other bodies, as well as in different stages of decomposition. In the artistic development of the theme of decomposition and decay there are only two types of matter, two definite formations of "flesh" – human and architectural. They are the receptacles of all sorts of energies, the connections of various semiotic codes – the most clearly demonstrated manifestations of regressive forces. The propensity to the metamorphoses of decomposition reveals and, in a special way, mythologizes the "corporeality" of these two organisms, and the inconstancy of the point of view on their relations in this state (fluctuations from allegory to thriller), constantly improves the iconography of Podolchak's aesthetics in general.

The artist's book Jacob Bohme was awarded as World's Best Book (Bronze Medal) by Stiftung Buchkunst Frankfurt am Main at Frankfurt Book Fair. One of his 24 personal exhibitions was the first art exhibition ever to be held in space, at space station Mir on January 25, 1993. Artworks of Podolchak can be found in 26 museums and public collections worldwide.

== Cinema ==
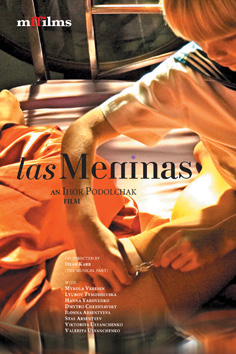
Poster Las Meninas

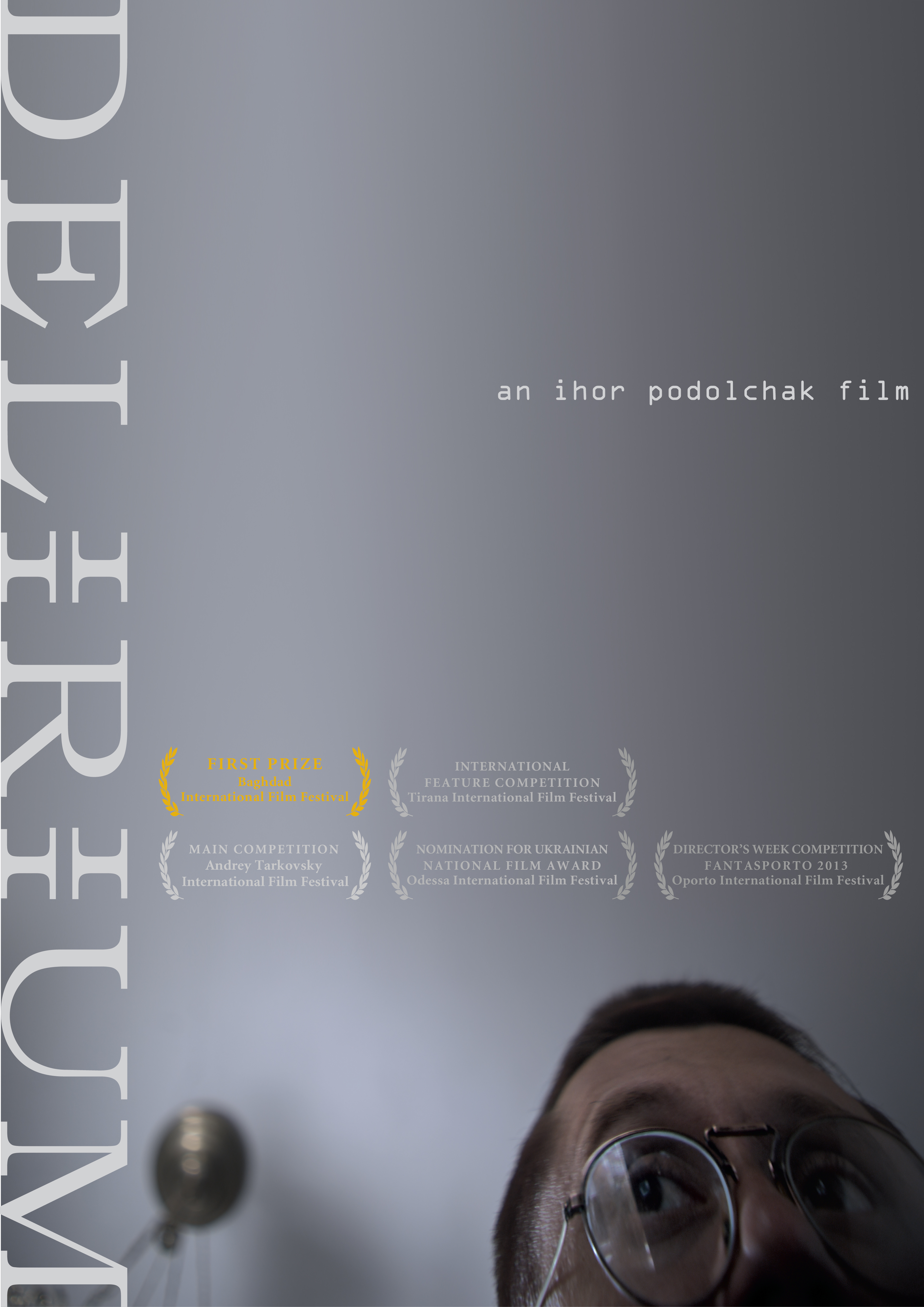
Poster Delirium

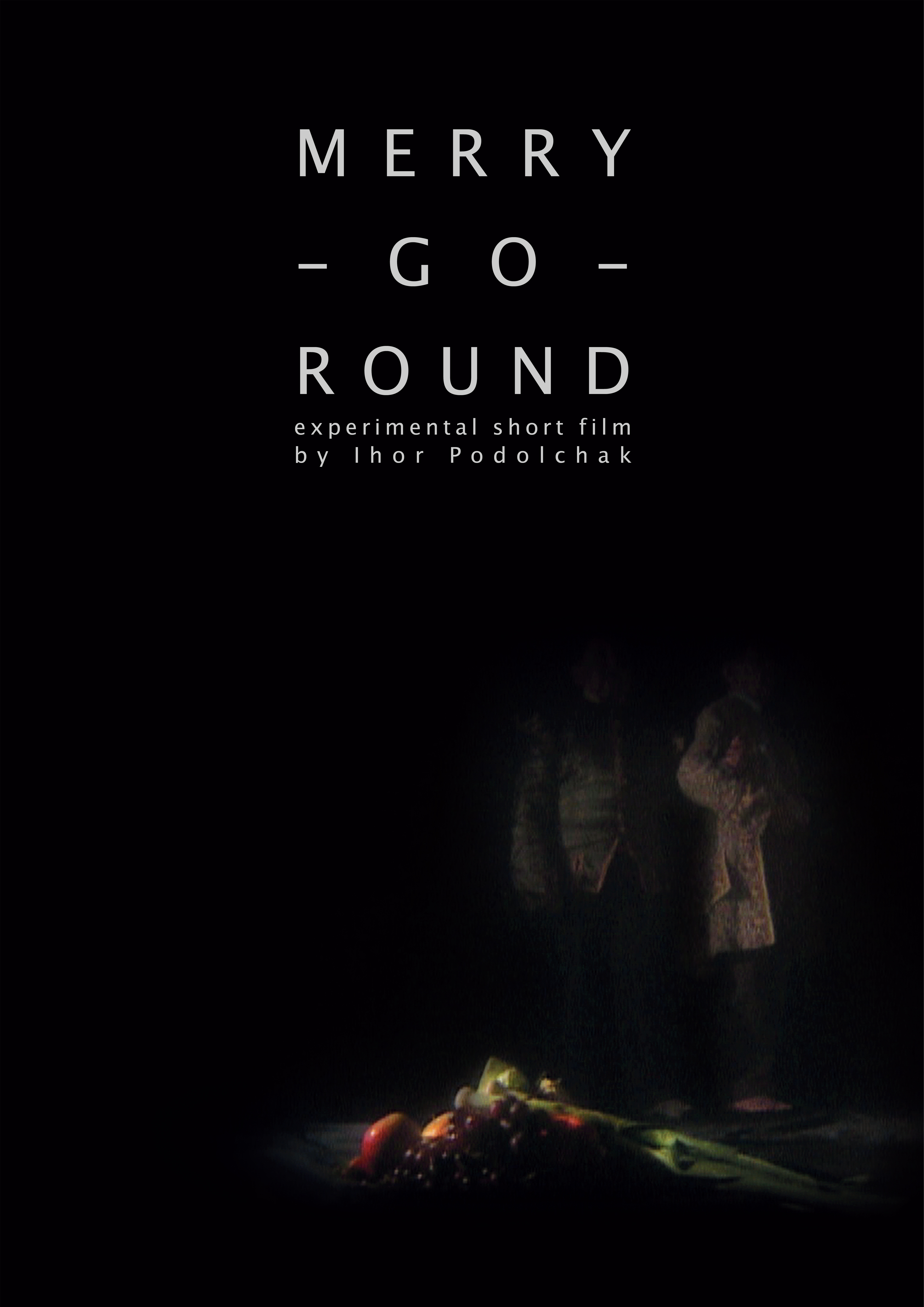
Poster Merry-Go-Round

Both Podolchak's films have common characteristic features: departure from narrative, anthropology of enclosed worlds, elaborated composition of frame, unusual shooting angles. The spaces of Las Meninas and Delirium are similarly dense, difficult for movement, tiresome both for the characters moving within them and the viewers watching them. This reflects the time of "the end of history" with its somnambulism, impotence, morbidity and hopelessness.

=== Las Meninas ===
Las Meninas is Podolchak's debut full-length film. He wrote, directed and produced it. The film had a world premiere at the International Film Festival Rotterdam in the competition program on January 25, 2008. Overall, it has participated in 27 international film festivals, including 10 competition programs.

=== Delirium ===
Delirium is Podolchak's second full-length feature. Its script is based on the story Inductor by the Ukrainian writer and journalist Dmytro Belyanskyi. The film's production lasted during 2008–2010. For the first time fragments of the film were demonstrated in 2012 on the 45th Karlovy Vary International Film Festival in the program Films in production. New full-length films from Central and Eastern Europe. After the prerelease screenings, Ukrainian film critics compared the second film of Podolchak to the works of Alain Robbe-Grillet, Pedro Costa and Nikos Nikolaidis.

Position 5 in Top-10 Ukrainian films of 2012 by "Афіша@Mail.Ru".

=== Merry-Go-Round ===
The first short length film (2017. Ukraine, Poland. 5 min). It was premiered at Revelation Perth International Film Festival on July 9, 2017 and was nominated for the Best Ukrainian Short Film at Odesa International Film Festival.

== Selected prizes and nominations ==
=== Prizes ===
- 2013 "First Prize", Baghdad International Film Festival, Iraq
- 1995 "Triennaleprize", 11th Norway International Print Triennial, Fredrikstad
- 1994 "Walter Tiemann Preis", Verein zur Förderung von Grafik und Buchkunst Leipzig e.V. an der Hochschule für Grafik und Buchkunst in Leipzig
- 1990 "Latvian Artist Union Prize", Triennial of miniature graphic art, Riga
- 1990 "1st Award for graphics", 5th Annual International Art Exhibition, Marietta, USA
- 1989 "Diploma", International Biennial of Art Impreza, Ivano-Frankivsk, Ukraine
- 1988 "Prix Ex Aequo", 12th International Print Biennial, Kraków
- 1987 "Honorable Medal", Small Graphic Forms, Łódź

=== Nominations ===
- 2017 "Best Ukrainian short film", Odesa International Film Festival
- 2013 "National Prize", Odesa International Film Festival
- 2013 "Best Director" Director's Week Competition, Fantasporto, Oporto International Film Festival, Porto
- 2009 "Prize", Trieste Film Festival
- 2008 "Tiger", 37th International Film Festival Rotterdam
- 2008 "Prize FIPRESCI", 7th Transilvania International Film Festival, Cluj-Napoca
- 2008 "Prize", 16th Artfilm International Film Festival, Slovakia

== Sources ==
- Last cantata. Ihor Podolchak : exhibition catalogue 11–28.07.2018. Kyiv : Golden Section, 2018. 38 p. (in Ukrainian and English)
- 100 Імен. Сучасне мистецтво України періоду Незалежності. (100 names. Contemporary Ukrainian Art from the Independence Time.) Київ: Видавництво "Мысль", 2008 ISBN 978-966-8527-62-3 (in Ukrainian)
- Bang-Heun, Cynn. Igor Podolchak. Catalog. Seoul: Ga In Gallery, 1992
- Böhme Jakob; Podolczak Igor; Tomkowski Jan. Artist's Book. Lodz: Correspondance des Arts II, 1993. OCLC 245835402
- Callaghan B. Fifteen Years in Exile. Toronto: Exile Editions, 1992 ISBN 1-55096-025-3
- Dyurych I; Podolchak, I. Art in Space. Special Edition for São Paulo Biennial. Kyiv: Masoch Fund, 1994
- Dyurych, I.; Podolchak, Ihor. Последний еврейский погром (The Last Jewish Pogrom). Kyiv: Masoch Fund, 1995 (in Russian)
- Dyurych, Ihor; Podolchak, I.; Тistol, О. Igor Podolchak : immoral-immortal. Lviv: Masoch Fund, 1999. ISBN 966-537-115-0
- Ewins, R.; Colless E. Igor Podolchak. Ukrainian Printmaker. Catalog. Hobart: University of Tasmania, 1991
- Flashback. Українське медіа-мистецтво 1990-х. Ukrainian media art of the 1990s. Catalog. Curators: Oleksandr Solovyov, Solomiya Savchuk. Київ: ДП НКММК Мистецький Арсенал, 2018. — 180 p. ISBN 978-966-97778-1-2, Pages 16, 24, 40–41, 117
- Fur, G. Dictionnaire du BDSM. Paris: La Musardine, 2016, pp. 3, 108, 153, 274. ISBN 2842718259, ISBN 978-2842718251
- Grenzgänger: acht Künstler aus der Ukraine. Linz: Büro für Kulturelle Auslandsbeziehungen des Landes Oberösterreich, 1994. ISBN 3-901246-09-6
- Matuszak, G.; Wozniak, Taras. Igor Podolchak. Lodz: Biuro Wystaw artystycznych, 1988
- Mikhaylovska O.; Podolchak, I.; Taranenko, A.Corpus delicti : post-erotic art photography. Prague: Masoch Fund, 1998. ISBN 978-966-7167-16-5
- Pethő, Ágnes. The Cinema of Sensations. Cambridge: Cambridge Scholars Publishing, 2015, pp. 155–182, ISBN 978-1-4438-6883-9, ISBN 1-4438-6883-3
- Pomiędzy. Polonistyczno-Ukrainoznawcze Studia Naukowe. Warsaw: University of Warsaw, Nr 1 (2015), pp. 137–146 Ciało cierpiące jako widowisko w malarstwie Igora Podolczaka i Wasylija Cagolowa / Marta Zambrzycka. ISSN 2543-9227 (in Polish)
- Raine, C.; Podolczak, Igor. Gilgamesh. Lodz, Poland: Book Art Museum, 1995. OCLC 82268972
- Rosiak, M. Igor Podolczak. Grafika. Catalog. Poznan: Galeria'72, 1989
- Rudel, J. Apocalypses: Rencontres Du Manege Royal.. La Garenne-Colombes: Editions de l'Espace européen, 1991 ISBN 2-7388-0139-0 OCLC 31674573
- Voznyak, T. Ihor Podolchak. Catalog. Lviv: Ukrainian Independent Center of Contemporary Art, 1991. OCLC 224935917 (in Ukrainian)
- Лук'янець В., Носко К. Де кураторство. (Where is the curatorial). — Х.: IST Publishing. 2017. — 256 p. Pages 40–47. ISBN 978-966-97657-0-3 (in Ukrainian)
- Носко К., Лук’янець В. Де кураторство. Художник як куратор та куратор як художник / упоряд. К. Носко, В. Лук’янець.. (Where is the curatorial). — Х.: IST Publishing. 2025. — 244 p. Pages 40–49. ISBN 978-617-8696-07-8 (in Ukrainian)
- Mистецька мапа України: Львів — живопис, графіка, скульптура. (Art Map of Ukraine: Lviv - painting, prints, sculpture.) Kyiv: I︠U︡velir-pres, 2008. ISBN 978-966-96579-4-7 (in Ukrainian)
