= Olha Bregman =

Ukrainian film producer

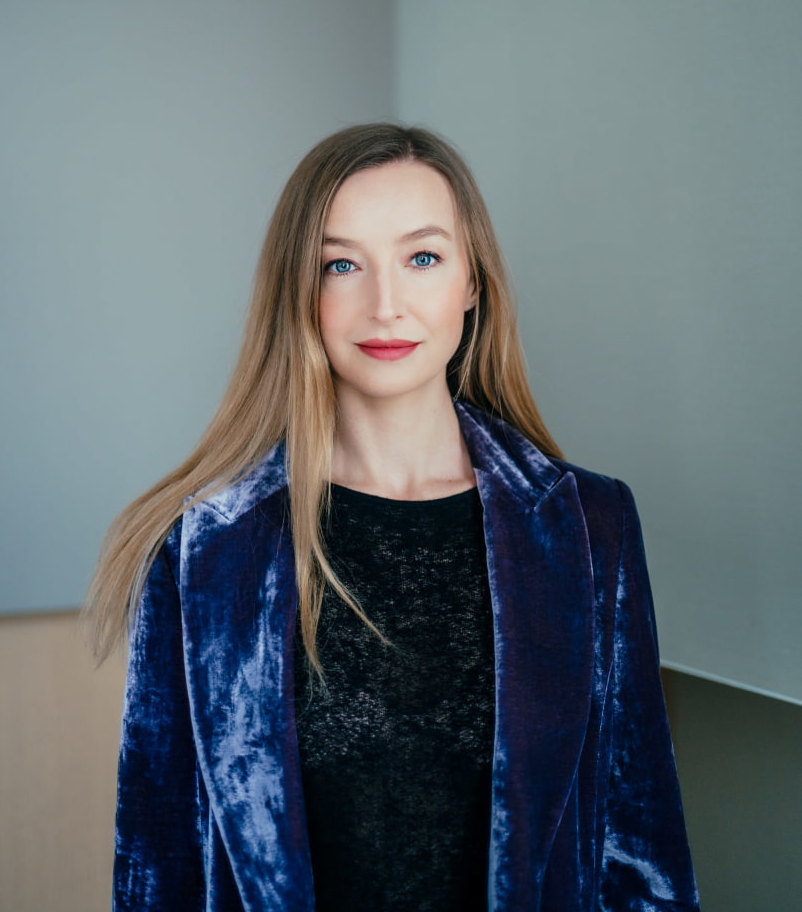
- Born: December 4, 1985 (age 40); Kyiv, Ukraine
- Occupation: Film producer
- Years active: 2012–present
- Organization: 2Brave Productions
- Known for: Timestamp, Intercepted, Rule of Two Walls
- Awards: Order of Princess Olga (III class).

Olha Mykolaivna Bregman (née Beskhmelnytsina; born 4 December 1985) is a Ukrainian film producer and co-founder of 2Brave Productions. She is known for producing documentary and fiction films presented at international film festivals, including the Berlin International Film Festival, the Rome Film Festival, and the Tribeca Festival

== Early life ==
Olha Bregman was born in Kyiv on 4 December 1985. She graduated from the Kyiv National University of Culture and Arts with a degree in Film Directing in 2012. She also studied International Economics at the Ukrainian State University of Finance and International Trade.

== Career ==
Bregman began her career in 2012 as an assistant producer at 435 Films, later working with MaGiKa Film, Digital Religion, and ESSE Production House.

In 2022, she co-founded 2Brave Productions with producer Natalia Libet. The company develops documentary and fiction films in international co-production.

Bregman is a member of the Ukrainian and European Film Academies, and served as Chair of the Ukrainian Film Academy from 2022 to 2024.

She co-produced two films directed by Kateryna Gornostai: the narrative feature Stop-Zemlia (2021), which won the Crystal Bear in the Generation 14plus section of the Berlin International Film Festival, and the documentary Timestamp (2025), which was selected for competition at Berlinale in 2025.

The documentary Rule of Two Walls, directed by David Gutnik and co-produced by Olha Bregman and Natalia Libet, received a Special Jury Mention in Tribeca’s documentary competition in 2023. Cuba and Alaska, directed by Yegor Troyanovsky, received the Best Documentary Award at the Rome Film Festival in 2025. In 2026,Traces, directed by Alisa Kovalenko and co-directed by Marysia Nikitiuk, received the Panorama Audience Award at the Berlin International Film Festival.

In addition to film work, Bregman is one of the four co-authors of two editions of the English-language guidebook Kyiv by Locals.

== Awards ==
In 2025, Bregman was awarded the Order of Princess Olga (III class) for her contribution to Ukrainian culture.

== Personal life ==
Since September 2024, Olha Bregman has been married to Ethan Bregman.

== Selected filmography ==
=== Documentary films ===
- The Living Fire (2014), dir. Ostap Kostyuk
- Vagrich and the Black Square (2014), dir. Andrii Zagdansky
- Ivan's Land (2019), dir. Andrii Lysetskiy
- Red Line. Corruption (2020)
- Demon (2020), dir. Yegor Troyanovsky
- Breaking into Baikonur (2019), Insiders Project
- Ukraine Overcoming the Darkness (2022)
- L'Arte Della Guerra (2023), dir. Tiziana Lupi, Marco Spagnoli
- Rule of Two Walls (2023), dir. David Gutnik
- Intercepted (2024), dir. Oksana Karpovych
- After the Rain: Putin's Stolen Children Come Home (2024), dir. Sarah McCarthy
- Timestamp (2025), dir. Kateryna Gornostai
- The Eukrainian (2025), dir. Viktor Nordenskjöld
- Cuba & Alaska (2025), dir. Yegor Troyanovsky – Best Documentary, Rome IFF; Jury & Audience Awards, Brussels IFF; Jury Award, Central Scotland Documentary Festival
- Traces (2026), dir. Alisa Kovalenko and co-dir. Marysia Nikitiuk

=== Short films ===
- Anna (2019), dir. Dekel Berenson;
- Blueberry Summer (2024), dir. Masha Kondakova
- Easter Day (2025), dir. Mykola Zaseev

=== Animated films ===
- Prychynna: The Story of Love (2017), dir. Andriy Shcherbak

=== Feature films ===
- Stop-Zemlia (2021), dir. Kateryna Gornostai
