= Natalia Libet =

Ukrainian film producer

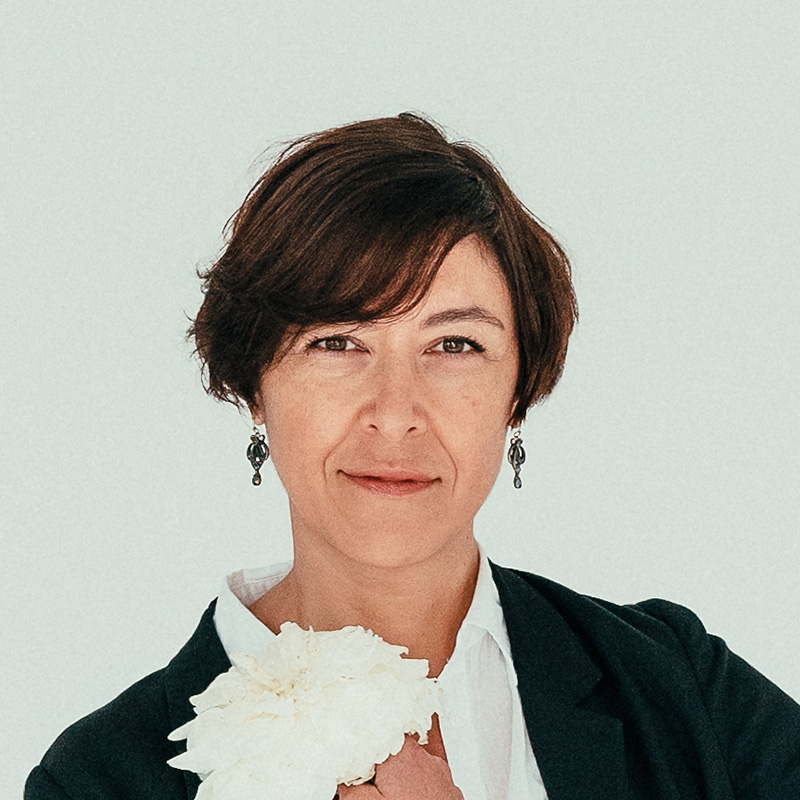
- Born: December 6, 1972; Lviv, Ukraine
- Citizenship: Ukraine
- Occupation: Film producer
- Years active: 2017–present
- Organization: 2Brave Productions
- Awards: Order of Princess Olga (III class)

Natalia Libet (born 6 December 1972) is a Ukrainian film producer and co-founder of the Kyiv-based production company 2Brave Productions. She has worked on documentary and fiction films, including international co-productions presented at film festivals such as the Berlin International Film Festival, the Venice Film Festival and the Tribeca Festival.

== Career ==
Libet has worked as a producer on fiction and documentary projects, with a focus on international co-productions.

In 2017 she joined the Ukrainian production companies Digital Religion and ESSE Production House.

In 2022 Libet co-founded the production company 2Brave Productions with producer Olha Bregman. The company works on Ukrainian and international films, including the documentary Rule of Two Walls (2023), directed by David Gutnik, and After the Rain: Putin's Stolen Children Come Home (2025), directed by Sarah McCarthy.

Ukrainian media have covered Libet's work on international co-productions and the support of Ukrainian cinema during the Russia–Ukraine war.

Natalia Libet has collaborated on several projects with director Kateryna Gornostai. Their collaborations include Stop-Zemlia and the documentary Timestamp (2025).

She produced Forever-Forever (2023), directed by Anna Buryachkova, which premiered at the Venice Film Festival and Cuba and Alaska directed by Yegor Troyanovsky, which premiered at Sheffield DocFest and later received the Best Documentary award at the 2025 Rome Film Festival.

Libet is a member of the European Producer's Club, the European and Ukrainian Film Academies and serves as head of First Cut+.

== Recognition ==
Libet has produced and co-produced films that have screened at major international film festivals. Her collaborations with Kateryna Gornostai include Stop-Zemlia (2021), which received the Crystal Bear in the Generation 14plus section of the Berlin International Film Festival and Timestamp (2025), selected for the festival's main competition.

Rule of Two Walls received a Special Jury Mention in Tribeca's documentary competition in 2023.. In 2026, Traces, produced by 2Brave Productions, received the Panorama Audience Award at the Berlin International Film Festival in 2026.

== Awards ==
In 2026, Libet was awarded the Order of Princess Olga (III class), a state honour of Ukraine, for her contribution to Ukrainian culture.

== Selected filmography ==
=== Narrative ===
- Stop-Zemlia (2021), producer
- Forever-Forever (2023), producer
- Do You Love Me? (2023), development producer
- Easter Day (2025), producer
- Blueberry Summer (2024), co-producer
- Parthenon (2019), co-producer
- Anna (2019), executive producer

=== Documentary ===
- Traces (2026), producer
- Timestamp (2025), producer
- Cuba & Alaska (2025), associate producer
- After the Rain: Putin's Stolen Children Come Home (2024), co-producer
- Rule of Two Walls (2023), executive producer
- Diary of a Bride of Christ (2022), producer
- Plai. A Mountain Path (2022), executive producer
