= List of LGBTQ-related films of 2021 =

2021 LGBT films

This is a list of lesbian, gay, bisexual, transgender or queer-related films released in 2021. It contains theatrically released films that deal with important gay, lesbian, bisexual, transgender or queer characters or issues and may have same-sex romance or relationships as a plot device.

== Films ==
Title	Director	Country	Genre	Cast	Notes	Ref
Acts of Love	Isidore Bethel, Francis Leplay	France, United States	Documentary			
After America	Jake Yuzna	United States	Drama	Yvonne Freese, Theresa McConnon, Daniel Nies, Ahmed Yusuf, Dan Fox, Eli Anthony, Robert Dante		
Ailey	Jamila Wignot	United States	Documentary			
All Eyes Off Me (Mishehu Yohav Mishehu)	Hadas Ben Aroya	Israel	Drama			
Alone (Seuls)	Paul Tom	Canada	Documentary			
Anaïs in Love (Les Amours d'Anaïs)	Charline Bourgeois-Tacquet	France				
Ayuda Babes	Joven Tan	Philippines	Comedy	Gardo Versoza, Ate Gay, Joey Paras, Iyah Mina, Marlo Mortel, Marc Logan		
Benedetta	Paul Verhoeven	France, Netherlands	Drama	Virginie Efira, Lambert Wilson, Daphne Patakia, Olivier Rabourdin, Clotilde Courau, Charlotte Rampling, Hervé Pierre		
Between Them (Toutes les deux)	Noël Mitrani	Canada	Romantic comedy	Veronika Leclerc Strickland, Mélanie Elliott, Vitali Makarov, Daniel Murphy, Laurent Lucas		
Billy Boy	Sacha Amaral	Argentina				
Bliss (Glück)	Henrika Kull	Germany	Drama			
Bruno Reidal, Confessions of a Murderer	Vincent Le Port	France				
Brutalia, Days of Labour	Manolis Lavris	Greece, Belgium				
Catching a Serial Killer: Bruce McArthur	James Buddy Day	Canada	Documentary			
Celts (Kelti)	Milica Tomovic	Serbia	Drama			
Cicada	Yoon Daewoen	South Korea	Thriller, Short film			
Cinderella	Kay Cannon	United States	Romantic comedy	Idina Menzel, Minnie Driver, Nicholas Galitzine, Billy Porter, Pierce Brosnan		
Compartment No. 6 (Hytti nro 6)	Juho Kuosmanen	Russia, Finland				
Cruella	Craig Gillespie	United States, United Kingdom	Crime, comedy	Emma Stone, Emma Thompson, Joel Fry, Paul Walter Hauser, Mark Strong, John McCrea, Kirby Howell-Baptiste		
Dawn, Her Dad and the Tractor	Shelley Thompson	Canada	Drama	Maya Henry, Robb Wells, Amy Groening, Reid Price		
The Divide (La Fracture)	Catherine Corsini	France	Drama	Valeria Bruni Tedeschi,Marina Foïs, Pio Marmaï		
Down in Paris	Antony Hickling	France	Drama	Antony Hickling, Jean-Christophe Bouvet, Manuel Blanc, Dominique Frot		
Esquí	Manque La Banca	Argentina, Brazil	Documentary			
Eternals	Chloé Zhao	United States	Superhero	Gemma Chan, Richard Madden, Kumail Nanjiani, Lia McHugh, Brian Tyree Henry, Lauren Ridloff, Barry Keoghan, Don Lee, Harish Patel, Kit Harington, Salma Hayek, Angelina Jolie		
Everybody's Talking About Jamie	Jonathan Butterell	United Kingdom	Musical Drama	Max Harwood, Richard E. Grant, Sarah Lancashire, Sharon Horgan, Lauren Patel, Ralph Ineson, Samuel Bottomley, Shobna Gulati, Adeel Akhtar		
Everything Went Fine (Tout s'est bien passé)	François Ozon	France	Drama	Sophie Marceau, André Dussollier, Géraldine Pailhas, Charlotte Rampling, Hanna Schygulla, Éric Caravaca, Grégory Gadebois		
The Fall of the Swift (La Caída del vencejo)	Gonzalo Quincoces	Spain	Short film			
Fanny: The Right to Rock	Bobbi Jo Hart	Canada	Documentary	Fanny		
Fear Street Part One: 1994	Leigh Janiak	United States	Slasher	Kiana Madeira, Olivia Scott Welch, Benjamin Flores Jr., Julia Rehwald, Fred Hechinger, Ashley Zukerman		
Fear Street Part Three: 1666	Leigh Janiak	United States	Supernatural horror	Kiana Madeira, Olivia Scott Welch, Benjamin Flores Jr., Julia Rehwald, Fred Hechinger, Ashley Zukerman		
Firebird	Peeter Rebane	United Kingdom, Estonia	Drama, romance, war	Tom Prior, Oleg Zagorodnii, Diana Pozharskaya		
Flee	Jonas Poher Rasmussen	United States, United Kingdom, France, Sweden, Norway, Denmark	Documentary			
Fresh Water	David Kalinauskas	Canada	Documentary	Antonio Lennert		
Frida	Aleksandra Odić	Germany	Drama, Short film			
Genderation	Monika Treut	Germany	Documentary			
Ghost Song	Nicolas Peduzzi	France	Documentary			
The Girl and the Spider (Das Mädchen und die Spinne)	Ramon Zürcher, Silvan Zürcher	Switzerland	Drama	Henriette Confurius, Liliane Amuat		
Great Freedom (Große Freiheit)	Sebastian Meise	Germany	Drama			
The Hill Where Lionesses Roar (Luaneshat e kodrës)	Luàna Bajrami	France, Kosovo	Drama			
How to Fix Radios	Emily Russell, Casper Leonard	Canada	Drama	James Rudden, Dimitri Watson, Willa Crowder, Hector Jenkins		
Human Factors (Der menschliche Faktor)	Ronny Trocker	Germany	Drama	Mark Waschke, Hassan Akkouch, Marthe Schneider, Spencer Bogaert		
If from Every Tongue It Drips	Sharlene Bamboat	Canada, United Kingdom, Sri Lanka	Documentary			
Instructions for Survival	Yana Ugrekhelidze	Georgia	Documentary			
International Dawn Chorus Day	John Greyson	Canada	Documentary	Shady Habash, Sarah Hegazi		
Jungle Cruise	Jaume Collet-Serra	United States	Adventure	Dwayne Johnson, Emily Blunt, Jack Whitehall, Edgar Ramirez, Jesse Plemmons, Paul Giamatti		
King Max	Adèle Vincenti-Crasson	France	Short			
Language Lessons	Natalie Morales	United States	Drama	Natalie Morales, Mark Duplass, Desean Terry		
The Last Chapter (La dernière séance)	Gianluca Matarrese	France, Italy	Documentary	Bernard Guyonnet	Winner of the Queer Lion at the 78th Venice International Film Festival	
The Laureate	William Nunez	United Kingdom	Drama	Tom Hughes, Dianna Agron, Laura Haddock, Fra Fee		
Leo by Night (Léo la nuit)	Nans Laborde-Jourdàa	France	Short drama	Nans-Laborde-Jourdàa, Cyusa Ruzindana Rukundo Marcou, Marie-Sohna Condé		
Leynilöggan	Hannes Þór Halldórsson	Iceland	Action, comedy	Auðunn Blöndal, Egill Einarsson, Björn Hlynur Haraldsson, Steinunn Ólína Þorsteinsdóttir		
Ma Belle, My Beauty	Marion Hill	France	Drama, romance			
Madalena	Madiano Marcheti	Brazil	Drama	Natalia Mazarim, Rafael de Bona, Pamella Yule		
The Man with the Answers	Stelios Kammitsis	Greece, Cyprus, Italy	Romantic drama, road movie	Vasilis Magouliotis, Anton Weil		
Mayor Pete	Jesse Moss	United States	Documentary	Pete Buttigieg		
La Mif	Fred Baillif	Switzerland	Drama			
Miguel's War	Eliane Raheb	Lebanon, Germany, Spain	Documentary			
The Mitchells vs. the Machines	Mike Rianda	United States	Science fiction, comedy	Abbi Jacobson, Danny McBride, Maya Rudolph, Mike Rianda, Eric André, Olivia Colman		
Moneyboys	C. B. Yi	Austria, Belgium, France, Taiwan		Kai Ko, Chloe Maayan, J.C. Lin, Bai Yufan, Sun Qiheng		
Moon, 66 Questions (Selini, 66 erotiseis)	Jacqueline Lentzou	Greece, France	Drama	Sofia Kokkali, Lazaros Georgakopoulos		
Mouth Congress	Paul Bellini, Scott Thompson	Canada	Documentary	Paul Bellini, Scott Thompson, Kevin McDonald		
My Girlfriend Is the Revolution	Marcelino Islas Hernández	Mexico	Coming-of-age, Romance	Sofía Islas, Ana Valeria Becerril, Flor Edwarda		
My Name Is Pauli Murray	Betsy West, Julie Cohen	United States	Documentary			
Neptune Frost	Saul Williams, Anisia Uzeyman	Rwanda, United States		Elvis Ngabo, Cheryl Isheja, Kaya Free		
No Fags (Tunten zwecklos)	Mirek Balonis, Jutta Riedel	Germany	Documentary			
North by Current	Angelo Madsen Minax	United States	Documentary			
On Solid Ground (Über Wasser)	Jela Hasler	Switzerland				
Operation Hyacinth (film)	Piotr Domalewski	Poland	Drama, Crime	Tomasz Ziętek, Hubert Miłkowski, Marek Kalita, Adrianna Chlebicka, Tomasz Schuchardt		
Paris, 13th District (Les Olympiades)	Jacques Audiard	France		Lucie Zhang, Makita Samba, Jehnny Beth, Noémie Merlant		
Pat Rocco Dared	Morris Chapdelaine, Bob Christie	Canada	Documentary	Pat Rocco		
The Power of the Dog	Jane Campion	Australia, New Zealand, United Kingdom, Canada	Drama	Benedict Cumberbatch,Kirsten Dunst, Jesse Plemons, Kodi Smit-McPhee, Thomasin McKenzie, Genevieve Lemon, Keith Carradine, Frances Conroy		
The Retreat	Pat Mills	Canada	Horror	Tommie-Amber Pirie, Sarah Allen		
Returning to Reims (Fragments)	Jean-Gabriel Périot	France	Documentary			
Ride or Die	Ryūichi Hiroki	Japan	Thriller	Kiko Mizuhara, Honami Sato, Yoko Maki, Shunsuke Tanaka, Anne Suzuki, Shinya Niiro, Tetsushi Tanaka, Setsuko Karasuma		
The Right Words (Haut les cœurs)	Adrian Moyse Dullin	France	Short film			
Scarborough	Shasha Nakhai, Rich Williamson	Canada	Drama	Liam Diaz, Essence Fox, Anna Claire Beitel		
The Scary of Sixty-First	Dasha Nekrasova	United States	Horror, Thriller	Betsey Brown, Madeline Quinn, Dasha Nekrasova		
Simone Is Gone (Simone est partie)	Mathilde Chavanne	France	Drama, Short film			
Softie (Petite Nature)	Samuel Theis	France				
Some Women	Quen Wong	Singapore	Documentary			
Someone Like Me	Steve J. Adams, Sean Horlor	Canada	Documentary			
Stillwater	Tom McCarthy	United States	Drama	Matt Damon, Camille Cottin, Abigail Breslin		
Stop-Zemlia	Kateryna Gornostai	Ukraine	Drama	Maria Fedorchenko, Arsenii Markov, Yana Isaienko, Oleksandr Ivanov, Andrii Abalmazov		
The Syed Family Xmas Eve Game Night	Fawzia Mirza	Canada, United States	Short comedy	Kausar Mohammed, Vico Ortiz		
Titane	Julia Ducournau	Belgium, France	Horror	Vincent Lindon, Agathe Rousselle, Garance Marillier, Laïs Salameh		
Venus by Water	Lin Wang	China	Drama			
We're All Going to the World's Fair	Jane Schoenbrun	United States	Horror	Anna Cobb, Michael J. Rogers		
Wheel of Fortune and Fantasy	Ryusuke Hamaguchi	Japan	Drama	Kotone Furukawa, Ayumu Nakajima, Hyunri, Kiyohiko Shibukawa, Katsuki Mori, Shouma Kai, Fusako Urabe, Aoba Kawai		
Wildhood	Bretten Hannam	Canada	Drama	Phillip Lewitski, Joshua Odjick, Michael Greyeyes, Joel Thomas Hynes		
Women Do Cry (Zhenite plachat)	Vesela Kazakova, Mina Mileva	Bulgaria	Drama	Maria Bakalova		
