= 2Brave Productions =

Ukrainian film production company

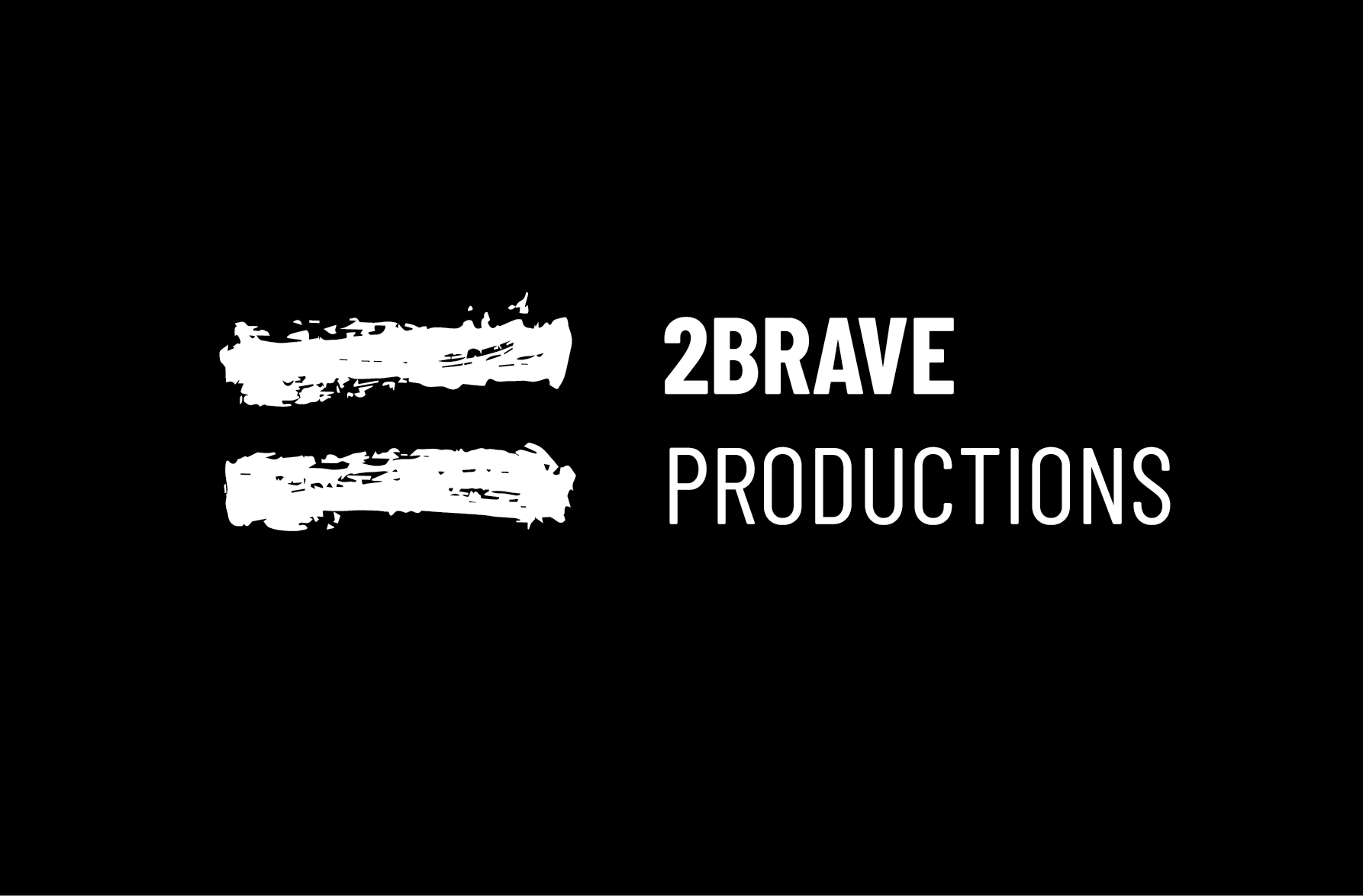
- Industry: Film production
- Founded: 2022
- Founders: Olha Bregman; Natalia Libet
- Headquarters: Kyiv, Ukraine
- Products: Feature films, documentary films
- Website: https://2braveproductions.com/

2Brave Productions is an independent Ukrainian film production company founded in 2022 by producers Olha Bregman and Natalia Libet. The company works in international co-productions in documentary and fiction filmmaking. Films produced by the company, such as Timestamp and Rule of Two Walls, have been selected for major international festivals, including the Berlinale, Tribeca, the Rome Film Festival and Sheffield DocFest.

== History ==
2Brave Productions was founded in 2022 by Ukrainian producers Olha Bregman and Natalia Libet.

In interviews, the co-founders stated that the full-scale Russian invasion of Ukraine influenced their decision to establish an independent production company focused on supporting Ukrainian filmmakers and developing international co-productions.

Among the company’s best-known productions are the documentary Timestamp directed by Kateryna Gornostai and selected for the main competition at the 75th Berlin International Film Festival; Cuba & Alaska directed by Yegor Troyanovsky, which won Best Documentary at the Rome Film Festival in 2025; and Rule of Two Walls, directed by David Gutnik, which received a Special Jury Mention in the documentary competition at the 2023 Tribeca Film Festival.

The documentary Rule of Two Walls was executive produced by Liev Schreiber, and its Los Angeles premiere in 2024 was moderated by Sharon Stone.

According to Filmmaker Magazine, Schreiber explained his decision to join Gutnik's project as an executive producer, stating:

“In David’s film, I saw the embodiment of the resilience I observed during my time in Ukraine: the profound spirit, sense of nation and history emboldened by an existential war. As an artist in my own right trying to do all that I can to help Ukraine, I responded to the film’s focus on Ukrainian artists processing the brutality of the war, while using their art to fight back.”

The documentary film Traces, directed by Alisa Kovalenko and co-directed by Marysia Nikitiuk, follows members of the organisation SEMA Ukraine, who document cases of torture and sexual violence during the Russo-Ukrainian war. The film premiered in February 2026 at the Berlin International Film Festival in the Panorama Dokumente section, where it received the Panorama Audience Award. According to media reports, Traces became the first Ukrainian film to receive this award.

== Founders ==
=== Olha Bregman ===
Olha Bregman is a Ukrainian film producer. Before co-founding 2Brave Productions, she worked with the production companies MaGiKa Film, Digital Religion, and ESSE Production House.

She is a member of the Ukrainian and European Film Academies, and served as Chair of the Ukrainian Film Academy from 2022 to 2024.

In 2025, Bregman was awarded the Order of Princess Olga (III class) for her contribution to Ukrainian culture.

Her producing credits include the feature film Stop-Zemlia (dir. Kateryna Gornostai), which won the Crystal Bear in the Generation 14plus section of the Berlin International Film Festival in 2021, and the documentary Intercepted (dir. Oksana Karpovych), which received awards at the 2024 Berlinale.

=== Natalia Libet ===
Natalia Libet is a Ukrainian film producer. She began her professional career in consulting and finance and later entered the film industry, working as a producer with the Ukrainian production companies Digital Religion and ESSE Production House prior to co-founding 2Brave Productions.

Libet is a member of the European Producers Club and of the European and Ukrainian Film Academies.

She produced films such as Stop-Zemlia (dir. Kateryna Gornostai) and the feature film Forever-Forever (dir. Anna Buryachkova), which premiered in the Orizzonti Extra section of the Venice Film Festival.

== Filmography ==
=== 2026 ===
- Traces — documentary, dir. Alisa Kovalenko and Marysia Nikitiuk; premiere in the Panorama Dokumente section of the 76-th Berlin International Film Festival, Panorama Audience Award

=== 2025 ===
- Timestamp — documentary, dir. Kateryna Gornostai; Berlin International Film Festival (Competition)
- Cuba & Alaska — documentary, dir. Yegor Troyanovsky; Sheffield DocFest; Best Documentary, Rome Film Festival
- Easter Day — short fiction film, dir. Mykola Zaseev
- The Eukrainian — documentary, dir. Viktor Nordenskjöld; CPH:DOX (F:ACT Award section)

=== 2024 ===
- After the Rain: Putin’s Stolen Children Come Home — documentary, dir. Sarah McCarthy; DOC NYC
- Blueberry Summer — short film, dir. Masha Kondakova, co-production

=== 2023 ===
- Rule of Two Walls — documentary, dir. David Gutnik; Tribeca Film Festival (Special Jury Mention)
- The Art of War — documentary, dir. Tiziana Lupi and Marco Spagnoli, co-production
