= Traces (film) =

2026 Ukrainian documentary film

- Ukrainian: Сліди
- Directed by: Alisa Kovalenko; Marysia Nikitiuk
- Produced by: Olha Bregman; Natalia Libet
- Cinematography: Alisa Kovalenko
- Edited by: Nikon Romanchenko; Alisa Kovalenko; Milenia Fiedler
- Music by: Wojciech Frycz
- Production companies: 2Brave Productions; Message Film
- Distributed by: Stranger Films Sales
- Release date: 16 February 2026 (Berlinale)
- Running time: 85 minutes
- Countries: Ukraine; Poland
- Language: Ukrainian

Traces (Ukrainian: Сліди) is a 2026 documentary film directed by Alisa Kovalenko and Marysia Nikitiuk. A co-production of Ukraine and Poland, it follows members of SEMA Ukraine, an organization of survivors of conflict-related sexual violence, as they document war crimes committed during the Russian invasion of Ukraine.

The film had its world premiere in the Panorama Dokumente section of the 76th Berlin International Film Festival on 16 February 2026, where it received the Panorama Audience Award, becoming the first Ukrainian film to win the prize. It was also selected as the Ukrainian entry for the Best International Feature Film at the 99th Academy Awards.

== Synopsis ==
Traces follows members of SEMA Ukraine, an organisation founded by survivors of conflict-related sexual violence (CRSV) committed during the Russian invasion of Ukraine. Through the journey of Iryna Dovhan, a former captive turned activist, who documents testimonies of affected women on the de-occupied territories of Ukraine, the film weaves a collective portrait of trauma. The film explores their efforts to document war crimes and support survivors, as well as the long-term consequences of wartime sexual violence, while focusing on resilience, solidarity, and the fight for justice.

== Production ==
The film is directed by Alisa Kovalenko and co-directed by Marysia Nikitiuk. It is a Ukrainian-Polish production by 2Brave Productions and Message Film, in association with Arte France, SEMA Ukraine and the Dr. Denis Mukwege Foundation. The Polish producers Violetta Kamińska, Izabela Wójcik, and Dariusz Jabłoński of the production company Message Film secured funding for the film from the Polish Film Institute. During production, the documentary was acquired by ARTE France.

Filming took place in Ukrainian territories affected by the Russian invasion and de-occupied by Ukrainian forces – such as Kyiv and Kherson regions.

The development of Traces grew out of the filmmakers' engagement with Ukrainian survivors of conflict-related sexual violence (CRSV). Director Alisa Kovalenko had previously worked as a human rights activist and had herself survived captivity and sexual violence in the Donbas in 2014. After publicly speaking about her experience, she became involved in the survivor community and later joined SEMA Ukraine, an organization bringing together Ukrainian women who survived CRSV as a result of Russian aggression.

Kovalenko began filming alongside Iryna Dovhan, a Ukrainian survivor and human rights activist who had been documenting testimonies of Russia's war crimes in Ukraine. The filmmakers recorded testimonies of survivors and followed their participation in mutual-support and advocacy activities. The production developed around a survivor-led approach, with the film focusing on the women's experiences, their relationships with one another, and their efforts to speak publicly about CRSV and seek justice.

The film's production was accompanied by a global impact campaign focused on conflict-related sexual violence, survivor advocacy and public awareness.

Alisa Kovalenko has described the film as both a documentary about the survivor community and a work created from within that community. She has emphasized the importance of the principle "Nothing about us without us" in the film's approach to representing survivors.

== Participants ==
The documentary features members of SEMA Ukraine, including:

- Iryna Dovhan
- Olha Cherniak
- Tetiana Vasylenko
- Halyna Tyshchenko
- Nina
- Liudmyla Mefodiivna Mymrykova

== Themes ==
The film examines conflict-related sexual violence during the Russian invasion of Ukraine and the experiences of survivors seeking justice and recovery. Rather than focusing solely on violence, the documentary explores resilience, mutual support and the restoration of personal agency through the work of SEMA Ukraine.

== Release ==
Traces had its world premiere in the Panorama Dokumente section of the 76th Berlin International Film Festival on 16 February 2026, where it received the Berlinale Panorama Audience Award.

== Reception ==
The documentary received positive critical attention following its premiere at the Berlin International Film Festival. Critics highlighted its portrayal of survivors' resilience, its treatment of trauma and recovery, and its focus on solidarity among women affected by conflict-related sexual violence.

== Accolades ==
- Berlinale Panorama Audience Award — Panorama Dokumente, 2026;
- Movies that Matter Grand Jury Documentary Competition Award, 2026;
- Top 20 Audience Favourites — Hot Docs Canadian International Documentary Festival, 2026;
- Millennium Docs Against Gravity: Smakjam Award for Best Production & Special Mention for Best Film in the Polish Competition, 2026.

== See also ==
- Conflict-related sexual violence
- Russian invasion of Ukraine
- List of submissions to the 99th Academy Awards for Best International Feature Film
- List of Ukrainian submissions for the Academy Award for Best International Feature Film
