= Wiz-Art =

Annual Ukrainian international short film festival

Lviv International Short Film Festival Wiz-Art
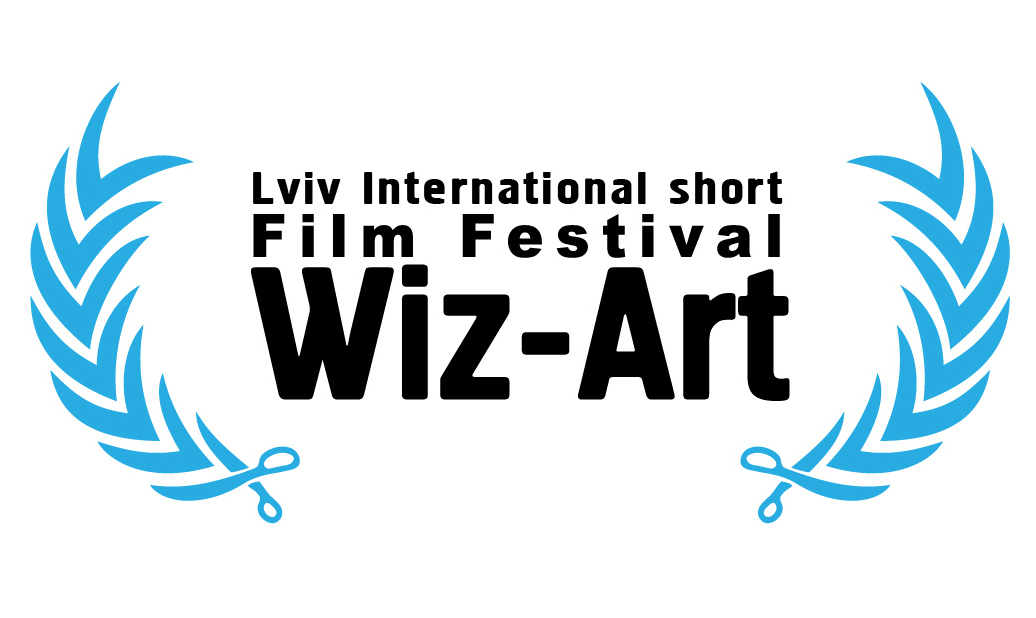
- Location: Lviv, Ukraine,
- Founded: 2008
- Festival date: July
- Language: International
- Website: http://wiz-art.ua/festival/

LISFF Wiz-Art is an annual International Short Film Festival, which takes place in Lviv, Ukraine at the end of July. The festival was started by art formation Wiz-Art, which was founded in 2008. The festival shows more than 100 brand new short movies every year. Wiz-Art is a powerful cultural and educational platform that unites Ukrainian and foreign filmmakers and introduces them to the Ukrainian audience experienced professionals. The festival has also premiered films featured as part of the Brussels Short Film Festival, in addition to collaborating with other festival programs.

== Competition program ==
Short film makers all over the world apply to participate in the festival. The festival shows more than 100 brand new short movies every year. Selected films in each category are eligible for several awards. Also, viewers are able to watch films from the non-competition program. Each year, the festival team chooses a socially relevant theme which is used as a basis for visual design at the event.

=== Awards ===
- GRAND PRIX OF LISFF Wiz-Art (in both competitions)

international competition:

- BEST DIRECTOR
- AUDIENCE AWARD

national competition:

- BEST UKRAINIAN FILM
- AUDIENCE AWARD

== Jury ==
The festival jury is elected by the administration of the festival. Usually there are several foreign guests in the jury and necessarily representative of Ukrainian cinema. The participants of the jury are professional directors, movie creators and producers. For eight years of the festival existence, representatives of the jury were: Ruth Paxton (Scotland), David Lindner (Germany), Vincent Moon (France), Igor Podolchak (Ukraine), Achiktan Ozan (Turkey), Anna Klara Ellen Aahrén (Sweden), Katarzyna Gondek (Poland), Christoph Schwarz (Austria), Gunhild Enger (Norway), Szymon Stemplewski (Poland), Philip Ilson (UK) and others.

== Festival history ==
=== 2008 ===
20-22 of November 2008 — I International Festival of Visual Art Wiz-Art. There were screenings of Sean Conway (UK), Boris Kazakov (Russia), Milos Tomich (Serbia), Volker Schreiner (Germany) films and retrospective show of the works of the famous avant-gardist Maya Deren (USA). 50 films were shown, 10 of which were short films of young Ukrainian filmmakers.

=== 2009 ===
23-25 of May 2009 — II International Festival of Visual Art Art Wiz-Art. Special guests were British movie maker and poet Julian Gende, German director Martin Sulzer (Landjugend) and Kevin Kirhenbaver, Russian producer and teacher Vladimir Smorodin. There were performances of VJs Shifted Vision and band Надто Сонна (2sleepy). There were retrospective shows of Scott Pagano and David Orayli works and the best movies of the Film School in Zlín (Czech Republic), Stockholm (Sweden), and Hamburg (Germany). Golden Apricot Yerevan International Film Festival and Slovak Festival Early Melons (Bratislava) presented their programs. Overall, 100 short films were shown.

=== 2010 ===
20–23 May 2010 — III International Short Film Festival Wiz-Art 2010. Special guests and members of the jury were Turkish director Ozan Achiktan, Slovak media artist Anton Cerny, Swedish filmmaker Anna Klara Oren, the Ukrainian producer Alexander Debych. The Festival was attended by directors from Ireland (Tony Donoh'yu), Spain (Fernando Uson), Portugal (Ana Mendes), Poland (Tomasz Jurkiewicz), Ukraine (Anna Smoliy, Gregory somebody Dmitry Red, Mrs. Ermine). There were retrospective shows of short films Finland and Asia. The best films of festivals in Italy (A Corto di Donne) and Russia (Beginning) were presented. The Grand Prix got the film "The Day of Life" (directed by Joon Kwok, Hong Kong). 105 films from 30 countries took part in competition and non-competition programs.

=== 2011 ===
26–29 May 2011 — IV International Short Film Festival Wiz-Art 2011. Special guests and members of the jury were Scottish filmmaker Ruth Paxton, German producer David Lindner and Ukrainian director Igor Podolchak. Tommy Mustniyemi (video-artist, Finland), Mike Mudgee (filmmaker, Germany), Emil Stang Lund (director, Norway), Morten Halvorsen (director, Denmark), Armin Dirolf (director, Germany) and others visited the festival. There were retrospective short films shows of the French-speaking part of Canada, the French animation and special program of Ukrainian short films. 98 films were shown in competition and non-competition programs. The Grand Prix got animated film The Little Quentin (Albert 'T Hooft & Paco Vink Netherlands 2010).

=== 2012 ===
26–29 July 2012 — V International Short Film Festival Wiz-Art 2012. Special guests and members of the jury were French filmmaker and traveler Vincent Moon, Icelandic filmmaker Isolde Uhadottir, coordinator of the International Festival Molodist Ilko Gladstein (Ukraine), Irish filmmaker Paul Odonahyu, also known as Ocusonic, Canadian director and producer Félix Dufour-Laperrière. The festival was attended by Hungarian director and an organizer of the BUSHO Festival Tamas Habelli, Ukrainian director Alexander Yudin, Max Afanasyev and Larisa Artyuhina. There were retrospective shows of Hungarian and Italian short films, as well as shows of young Ukrainian films "Cry, but shoot" (the quote of Alexander Dovzhenko) involving directors. As the part of Wiz-Art 2012 the audience had an opportunity to visit the Wiz-Art Lab — film school with lectures and master classes given by participants and guests of the festival. 98 films from 38 countries were shown in competition and non-competition programs. Grand Prix received the film Fungus (Charlotte Miller, Sweden, 2011).

=== 2013 ===
24-29 of July 2013 — VI International Short Film Festival Wiz-Art 2013. Special guests were Philip Illson, director of London Short Film Festival, Maria Sigrist, Austrian filmmaker, Dmytro Sukholytkiy-Sobchuk, Ukrainian filmmaker, Florian Pochlatko, Austrian filmmaker, and Romas Zabarauskas, Lithuanian film director. Grand Prix received the film Maybes (Florian Pochlatko, Austria, 2012) — an intimate story with larger issues at stake relating to the time we are living in. The other winners of Wiz-Art 2013 are: Best Director — Tarquin Netherway for the film The River (Australia, 2012), Best Script — Prematur (Gunhild Enger, Norway, 2012), Special Mention — Jamon (Iria Lopez, United Kingdom, 2012), Audience Award — Touch and See (Taras Dron, Ukraine, 2013).

=== 2014 ===
24-27 of July 2014 — VII International Short Film Festival Wiz-Art 2013. Special guests and members of the jury are: Gunhild Enger, Norwegian film director, Kateryna Gornostai, Ukrainian film director, Szymon Stemplewski, director of the Short Waves Festival (Poland), Mykyta Lyskov, Ukrainian director-animator, Volodymyr Tykhyy, art director of the Babylon’13 project, Olha Makarchuk, Ukrainian director-animator, Lisa Weber, Austrian filmmaker, and Ismael Nava Alejos, Mexican film director. The competition program consists of 15 short films from around the world. The national competition program has 11 Ukrainian shorts. Also, Wiz-Art 2014 presents a special documentary program dedicated to short films about Euromaidan and retrospectives of best Ukrainian short film classic of XX century. Wiz-Art Film School, an educational block, consists of lectures, Q&A sessions, meetings and workshops with festival guests.

=== 2017 ===
October 11-15 - X festival, the theme "What is the theory of life" (with the deliberate mistake of emphasizing the superficial perception of the world, where it is customary to look for simple recipes for happiness, about trying to appear instead of being). The program includes more than 100 tapes. Jury of the festival: director Svitlana Shymko (Ukraine), director and film producer Chris Dohr (Austria), director and film producer Terez Konz (Hungary). The Grand Prix of the festival and the prize of audience sympathy in the national competition went to the film "Pislyasmak" by the Ukrainian director Yury Katynskyi, the film "Technical break" by Philip Sotnichenko was the best Ukrainian short film, and the special award of the Ukrainian competition program went to the film "Kyiv-Moscow" by Anna Lyubinetskaya. In the international competition, the prize for the best direction was awarded to the film "Cold and Hot" by Marta Prus (Poland), the prize for the best cinematography was awarded to the film "Lighting" directed by Marzio Miranda Perez (Brazil), the prize for the best screenplay was awarded to the film "Fat Guys" directed by Sorayos Prapapana (Thailand), the film "Frenchwoman" directed by Yoshi Anyembe (France) received the audience's favorite prize, the film "Polonaise" directed by Agnieszka Elbanowska (Poland) received a special award from the jury. Meetings, presentations, film screenings, awakenings, theories, theories and practical workshops took place within the Wiz-Art Lab. The out-of-competition program "UA DOC Special" and 6 special film screenings were also presented: Archive films about Lviv, festival hits, COME OUT PLEASE LGBT program, LATE NIGHT SEXY SHORTS, THEORY OF LIFE. Physiology, THEORY OF LIFE. Proximity and other events.

=== 2018 ===
August 6-12 - XI festival, the theme of the festival is "What we don't see" - phenomena that go beyond our usual paradigm. The program includes more than 100 of the most current and brightest tapes from Ukraine and the world. The winners of the festival were determined by an international jury consisting of Ukrainian producer and program coordinator Daria Bassel, director Mark Raymond Wilkins and program selector and consultant of many film festivals Massimiliano Nardulli. The Grand Prix of the festival was won by Macedonian director Goran Stolevsky's film "Just look at her", the best Ukrainian short film was Kiril Zhekov's "Fishing Lesson". In the international competition, the film "Retouch" directed by Kave Mazagheri (Iran) received the prize of audience sympathy and the prize for the best screenplay, the prize for the best directorial work went to the film "I will always love you, Connie" directed by Amanda Kernel (Denmark). The audience sympathy prize of the Ukrainian competition went to the film "Mia Donna" by Pavlo Ostrikov. Special honors were awarded to the film "Ella - Essays on Departure" by Oliver Adam Cusio from Germany and "The Weightlifter" by Dmytro Suholytky-Sobchuk from Ukraine. As part of Wiz-Art Lab, in addition to film screenings and Q&A, discussions and talks by directors, a film screening by Wiz-Art Film School participants took place. For the first time, an experimental screening of the Sound and Vision film screening with organ improvisation was held. Special events were: AT THE CROSSROADS. URBAN MOBILITY SHORTS - Outdoor movie screening, GET EQUAL! SLIM! MARCH! — Equality Film Screening and Discussion, Roundup-Archive-Film-Archive - Screening and discussion of films created from media archive material, The Best of Britain FROM LSFF A selection from the London Short Film Festival, Midnight/Morning sexy shorts, END YOUTH Films about heroes of their time, Films for children 12+, festival hits and other non-competitive programs.

=== 2019 ===
August 19-25 - XII festival under the slogan "Dare to see. Dare to See” — blurriness is the defining characteristic of our trembling age. The festival program includes about 120 films. The winners were determined by an international jury consisting of director, producer and curator of art projects Nadia Parfan from Ukraine, director and screenwriter Jannik Dahl Pederson from Denmark and sales manager at Interfilm Berlin Short Sales&Distribution Sara Dombrink from Germany. 26 films - 10 in the national and 16 in the international programs - competed for the attention of the jury and the audience. The Grand Prix of the festival and the prize for the best screenplay was won by the film directed by Bohdan Muresanu from Romania "Christmas Gift". The best Ukrainian film was the animated film "Love" by Nikita Lyskov. The film "In joy, and only in joy" by Maryna Roschyna received a special award, the film "Summer and everything else" by Sven Bresser received the prize for the best director of the international competition. Audience awards went to "Anna" by Dekel Berenson (Britain) and "Plus One" by Myroslava Klochko (Ukraine). This year, the festival joined the top 10 festivals whose audience will choose the winner of the European Audience Award for short films. The 6th pitching of film projects took place within the framework of the festival. As part of Wiz-Art Lab, film screenings and Q&A with Nikita Lyskov, Yarema&Himey, Nadia Parfan, Sarah Dombrink and Yannik Dahl Pederson took place. This year there were 12 special screenings: festival hits and Sound and Vision, I want to believe, the best eight, memory archives, night films about from turn, dare to see, good night baby - horror shorts, way home. independence films, candid morning films, comedy shorts and more.

=== 2020 ===
September 7-13 - XIII festival under the slogan "I am with you". Due to quarantine restrictions caused by the COVID-19 pandemic, the screening took place for the first time in a new format - offline in Lviv, as well as at the Wiz-Art Film Festival Online cinema. The curators of the festival selected 30 films from among 1,500 submitted applications for the competition programs. The international competition consisted of three screenings, during which 18 films from 17 countries of the world fought for the victory. 11 films by Ukrainian directors took part in the National Competition. The winners of the International Competition Program were determined by the director, Bohdan Muresanu, a member of the program department of the International Film Festival in Karlovy Vary, Anna Korinek, and Yuliya Sinkevich, the general producer of the Odesa International Film Festival. The jury of the National Competition Program consisted of Deken Berenson, a British writer, Ivan Kozlenko, the general director of the Dovzhenko Center, and Kateryna Gornostay, a documentary filmmaker.

According to the results of the competition, the film "Southern Fever" by Thomas Woodroffe received a special award in the international competition "for outstanding cinematography". Irene Morai's film "Watermelon Juice" won the award for the best screenplay in the international competition. Ioseb "Soso" Bliadze was awarded the audience's sympathy prize for "Tradition". "Save me, doctor" by Dmytro Greshko was recognized as the best Ukrainian film. Natalia Kiselova's "Carpet" received a special award 1 in the national competition "for creating a lyrical image of a Ukrainian teenager, in whose life love and war enter equally rapidly and fatefully, giving rise to a hitherto unknown feeling of care and self-sacrifice on the way to growing up and accepting the Other." The audience sympathy prize in the national competition was awarded to the film "In our Synagogue" by Ivan Orlenko. The Grand Prix of the festival was won by the film "Do not sleep, be alert" directed by Pam Tien An.
