= My Dear Theo =

My Dear Théo
- Directed by: Alisa Kovalenko
- Written by: Alisa Kovalenko
- Release date: March 23, 2025
- Country: Ukraine

My Dear Théo is a 2025 Ukrainian co-production documentary written and directed by Alisa Kovalenko.

== Synopsis ==
The film is narrated as a letter from mother Alisa Kovalenko, a voluntary soldier in the Ukrainian Voluntary Army. As a mother and filmmaker, she promised to join the frontline combat in the case of a full-scale Russian invasion to Ukraine. After the 2022 Russian invasion, Kovalenko left her family and enlisted in the army. In the film, she reflects on her day-to-day life in the army and discusses her diary written for her son Theo.

The documentary was filmed from April 2022 until the beginning of 2024.

== Release ==
My Dear Theo was released on March 23, 2025 at the Copenhagen International Documentary Film Festival.
