= Human Factors (film) =

- Sundance release poster
- Directed by: Ronny Trocker
- Written by: Ronny Trocker
- Produced by: Susanne Mann; Martin Rehbock; Paul Zischler
- Starring: Mark Waschke; Sabine Timoteo; Hassan Akkouch; Marthe Schneider; Spencer Bogaert
- Cinematography: Klemens Hufnagl
- Edited by: Julia Drack
- Music by: Anders Dixen
- Release date: 29 January 2021 (Sundance)
- Running time: 102 minutes
- Countries: Germany; Italy; Denmark
- Languages: French; German; Flemish

Human Factors is a German-Italian-Danish co-production drama film directed and written by Ronny Trocker. The film stars Mark Waschke, Sabine Timoteo, Hassan Akkouch, Marthe Schneider and Spencer Bogaert.

The film had its world premiere at the 2021 Sundance Film Festival on 29 January 2021.

== Synopsis ==
A mysterious housebreaking exposes the agony of an exemplary middle class family.

— Variety

== Cast ==
- Mark Waschke as Jan
- Sabine Timoteo as Nina
- Hassan Akkouch as Hendrik
- Marthe Schneider as Amélie
- Spencer Bogaert as Lucas

== Production ==
The film began principal photography on 2 November 2019 and concluded on 12 December 2019. It was shot in Hamburg, Bruges, Koksijde, Blankenberge, De Panne and Veurne.

== Release ==
The film had its world premiere at the 2021 Sundance Film Festival on 29 January 2021.

== Reception ==
On the review aggregator website Rotten Tomatoes, 71% of 34 critics' reviews are positive.
