= We Will Not Fade Away =

2023 Ukrainian documentary film

- Official poster
- Directed by: Alisa Kovalenko
- Screenplay by: Alisa Kovalenko
- Produced by: Valery Kalmykov; Oleksiy Kobelev; Yana Kalmykova
- Cinematography: Alisa Kovalenko; Serhiy Stetsenko
- Edited by: Marina Maykovskaya
- Music by: Wojciech Frycz
- Production companies: ARTE G.E.I.E. Current Time TV; East Roads Films; HAKA Films
- Release date: 19 February 2023 (Germany)
- Running time: 100 minutes
- Countries: Ukraine; Poland; France
- Languages: English; Ukrainian; Russian

We Will Not Fade Away (Ukrainian: «Ми не згаснемо», romanized: My ne zhasnemo) is a 2023 Ukrainian documentary film written and directed by Alisa Kovalenko. The film was made with a children and teenager centric theme as it reflects the lives of youngsters who aspire to achieve their life goals amid uncertain chaotic circumstances which threaten to demolish their dreams and hopes. The film premiered in the Generation 14plus section at the 73rd Berlin International Film Festival on 19 February 2023. The film also premiered in the creative documentaries section at the 2023 Geneva International Film Festival and Forum on Human Rights.

== Synopsis ==
The documentary focuses on the plight of the Ukrainians and it has been portrayed through the lives of five teenagers namely Andriy, Ruslan, Ilya, Lisa and Lera who are living in the conflict-ridden Donbas region of Ukraine. The documentary dates back to 2019 where bombings can be heard in the background. However, things take swift turnaround as the teenagers receive a golden opportunity to embark on a journey to Nepal for the Himalayan expedition which eventually provides them a sigh of relief and also a sign of positive distraction for them in order to escape from the harsh reality.

== Production ==
The principal photography of the film began in 2019 and the filming predominantly took place in Eastern Ukraine where the director of the film Alisa Kovalenko spent three years for the shooting. The film was shot and set in the backdrop of Luhansk region in Zolotyi and Stanytsia Luhanska. The filming was wrapped up in 2022 coinciding with Russia's full-scale invasion of Ukraine which began in February 2022. The film was bankrolled by ARTE G.E.I.E., Current Time TV, East Roads Films and HAKA Films in a joint collaboration and support with State Film Agency of Ukraine, Polish Film Institute and IDFA Bertha Fund.

== Awards ==
The film received an honorable mention for the Nigel Moore Award for Youth Programming at the 2023 DOXA Documentary Film Festival.
