= Neukölln Unlimited =

- Directed by: Agostino Imondi; Dietmar Ratsch
- Written by: Agostino Imondi
- Produced by: Arek Gielnik; Dietmar Ratsch; Sonia Otto; Nico Hain; Boris Michalski; Prof. Didi Danquart
- Starring: Hassan Akkouch; Lial Akkouch; Maradona Akkouch
- Cinematography: Dietmar Ratsch
- Edited by: Agostino Imondi; Lars Späth
- Music by: Eike Hosenfeld; Moritz Denis; Tim Stanzel
- Distributed by: GMfilms / Barnsteiner-Film
- Release dates: February 13, 2010 (Berlinale); April 8, 2010 (Germany)
- Running time: 96 minutes
- Country: Germany
- Language: German

Neukölln Unlimited is a 2010 German documentary. The film follows three Lebanese siblings—Hassan, Lial and Maradona—through their daily lives in Berlin's district of Neukölln.

The film was co-produced by the German broadcaster RBB in collaboration with the Franco-German cultural channel Arte. Financial support for the documentary came from the German Federal Film Board, DFFF, Medienboard Berlin-Brandenburg, as well as from MFG Baden-Württemberg and the MEDIA Programme of the European Union.

The children of the Akkouch family, Hassan (18), Lial (19), and Maradona (14), are successful musicians and breakdancers who live in Berlin. They grew up with hip hop and streetdance, that is their language and their passion. But the pressure has put a strain on the two teenagers and a rivalry arises about who should be the family's main breadwinner.

In the meantime, Maradona gets himself into more and more trouble, and is suspended from school. He is at the crossroads between his siblings’ ambitious lifestyle and the street life of his mates. However, a surprising qualification for a TV-casting show could prove to be his turning point. If he wins the 100,000 euro prize money, he might be the one who saves the family.

Neukölln Unlimited can best be described as a musical film that deals with the topic of integration of immigrant youth living in neglected urban areas.

== Music and dance ==
The film score was produced by the German composers Eike Hosenfeld, Moritz Denis and Tim Stanzel. The musicians took their inspirations from the urban music played by the film's protagonists Hassan and Lial, breakdance type music heard during battles, as well as traditional middle-eastern melodies. This mixture of different sounds emphasizes the "living-in-two cultures" of the film's protagonists and their peers in Neukölln.

Other songs heard in the film were performed by Hassan and Lial's band NoIBN, and were produced by the independent music label Foreign Flavour. A lot of emphasis is also put on dance. Beside the various subgenres of street dancing, other forms like contemporary and expressionist dance are used as filmic metaphors for the protagonists' coming of age.

The soundtrack of the film is released exclusively for download by the German record label Salon Mondial. The album includes the complete music from the documentary, as well as some bonus tracks inspired by the film.

== Animation ==
To convey the protagonists' experience made during a past deportation, and to take the audience along on this emotional journey, the directors decided it was important not to show the historical context by using the classical documentary style of so-called "talking heads" giving interviews. They wanted to find a way to convey the experience of being deported and of feeling like a stranger in one's homeland, in this case Lebanon. They needed something that would remain in the audiences’ memories long after having seen the film. Because graffiti is a major artistic method of expression in the hip-hop and breaker scene, the directors decided to portray past events in the style of comic strips. Comic strip artist Benjamin Kniebe developed the drawings. Animation specialist Julia Dufek made the individual drawings come to life. The challenge of the animated sequences lay in portraying the drama without appearing unintentionally funny. Since "Neukölln Unlimited" is a low-budget production, complicated animation scenes were avoided and drama was created with the help of music, sound design, and, especially, Hassan's anecdotes.

== Filming locations ==
A breakdance battle was filmed in the gym hall of the Rütli highschool. Some famous Berlin locations seen in the film are the East Side Gallery, the Soviet War Memorial, and the former techno club E-Werk. Parts of the film were also shot in Cologne, Reggio Emilia, and at the Théâtre national de Chaillot in Paris.

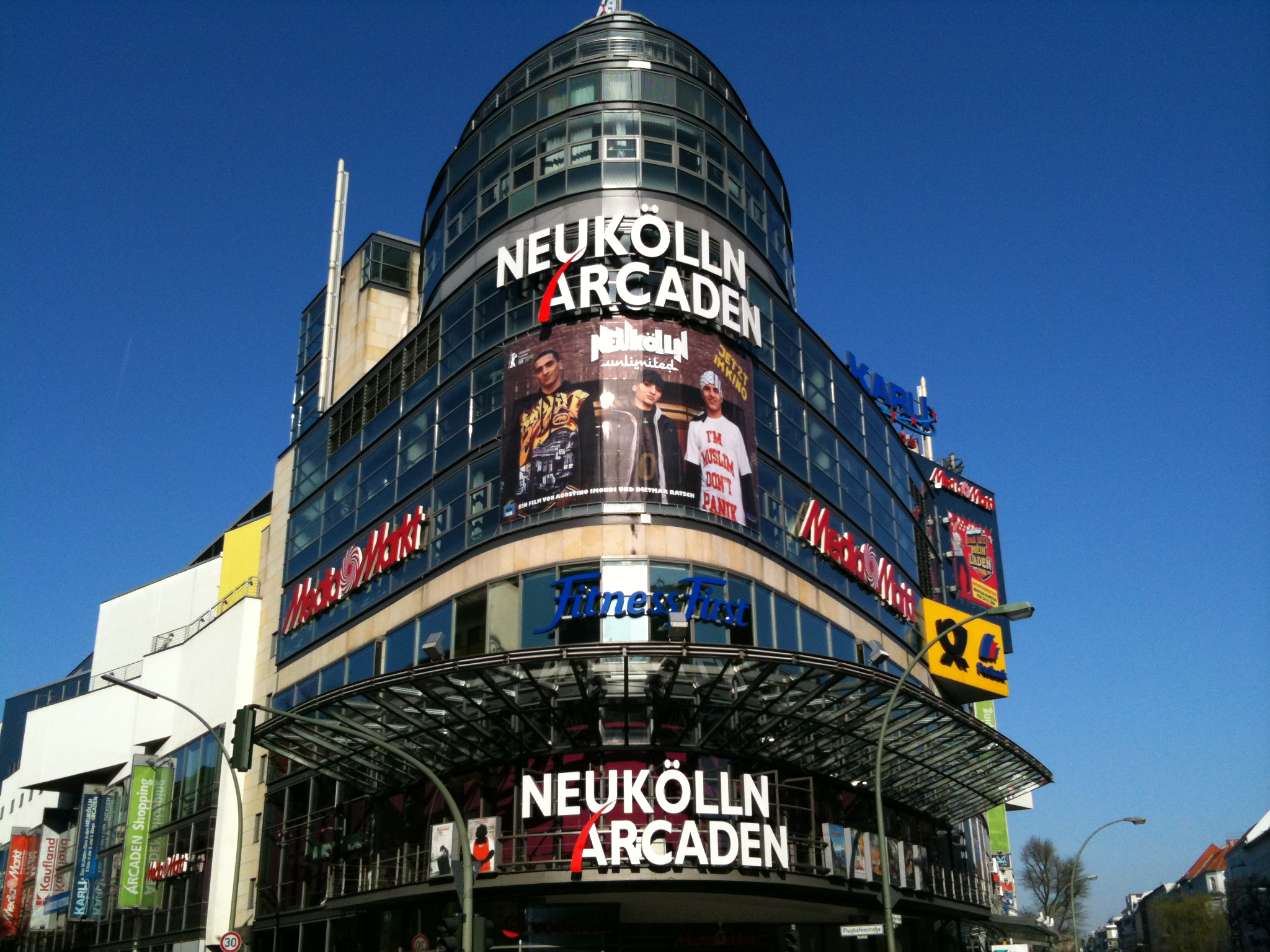
Filmposter hanging from the façade of a shopping centre in Berlin-Neukölln

== Festivals ==
- 60th Berlin International Film Festival
- 12th Buenos Aires International Festival of Independent Cinema
- 23rd Singapore International Film Festival
- Sarajevo Film Festival 2010
- CineSparks Film Festival for Young People, Brisbane 2010
- 12th Taipei Golden Horse Film Festival, Section "Next Generation"
- 11th Seoul International Youth Film Festival, Section "It's ok to be different"
- 6th Tel Aviv International Children Film Festival
- Chicago International Children's Film Festival
- "Movies That Matter" Film Festival, Den Haag
- "Moscow, Achtung Berlin!" Film Festival
- Monterrey International Film Festival
- São Paulo International Film Festival
- German Film Days, Hanoi, Vietnam
- European Film Festival, Yangon, Myanmar

== Awards ==
- Crystal Bear for best Feature Film, 60th Berlin International Film Festival
- Film Workers Union Award, Buster Film Festival 2010, Copenhagen
- 1st Prize for Feature Documentary, Chicago International Children's Film Festival
- MovieSquad All Rights Award, Movies That Matter Film Festival, The Hague, won

== Nominations ==
- Peace Film Award 2010
- German Film Critics Award 2011
- German Documentary Film Award 2011
