= Waking Up the Nation =

Waking up the Nation: The Freedom Bus
- Directed by: Agostino Imondi
- Written by: Agostino Imondi
- Produced by: Agostino Imondi, Adam Ceremuga
- Music by: Geoffrey Datson
- Distributed by: VideoTeppista
- Release dates: June 2002 (Australia); January 2006 (Germany)
- Running time: 48 min.
- Country: Australia
- Language: English

Waking up the Nation: The Freedom Bus is an Australian documentary film shot in 2002 and internationally released in 2005, directed by Agostino Imondi.

== Plot ==
The documentary tells the story of a group of Australian human rights activists, who travel on an old bus, the Freedom Bus, to visit asylum seekers imprisoned in immigration detention centres across the country, and to educate Australian communities on their 12,000-kilometres-journey. As the first civilians, they visited the detainees in some of the most remote parts of the country, like the detention centres in Port Hedland, and Curtin, and managed to expose some of the human rights violations committed against the asylum seekers in the camps.

== Production and release ==
The film was shot Guerilla filmmaking style during the months of January and February 2002. A small funding for the film was provided by private donors. An early 80-minutes version of this film, aimed at local political activist groups, was released in Australia in 2002. In 2005 the film was re-edited for international audiences, and had a limited theatrical and DVD release in 2006. Segments of the film were also used for the BBC-documentary "Australia's Pacific Solution"

Additional footage from the documentary was also used by Amnesty International as part of the Make Some Noise campaign.

Some of the film's footage was also heavily used by anti-racism advocacy groups in Australia for their campaigns.

== Festivals ==
- Aljazeera International Documentary Film Festivall
- Singapore International Film Festival
