= Odesa International Film Festival =

Annual film festival in Ukraine

- Location: Odesa, Ukraine
- Founded: 2010
- Awards: Grand Prix "The Golden Duke"
- Producers: Viktorya Tigipko, President
- Festival date: second half of July
- Language: Ukrainian, English
- Website: https://oiff.com.ua/en

The Odesa International Film Festival (Ukrainian: Оде́ський міжнаро́дний кінофестива́ль) is an annual film festival held in the middle of July in Odesa, Ukraine.

Since 2016 the festival program has consisted of three parts: the International competition, National competition and European Documentary competition. The National competition is divided into Features and Shorts.

== History ==
The first Odesa International Film Festival was held from 16 to 24 July 2010. As part of the Festival, a competitive program of 16 feature films was shown. In total, more than 100 films were presented at the competitive and non-competitive screenings at the festival. For the first 2 years, "Rodina" cinema served as the main venue for the festival as well as the festival center in which competitive screenings and all main events of the festival took place. Since 2012, the main location of the event has been the Festival Palace of Odesa Theater of Musical Comedy with 1,260 seats. "Rodina" cinema remains a festival center, which hosts screenings of the Ukrainian national competitive program, non-competitive programs and retrospectives, as well as workshops.

The opening and closing ceremonies, as well as the traditional "red carpet" for film festivals are held at the famous Odesa Opera and Ballet Theatre – one of the most famous architectural monuments of Ukraine.

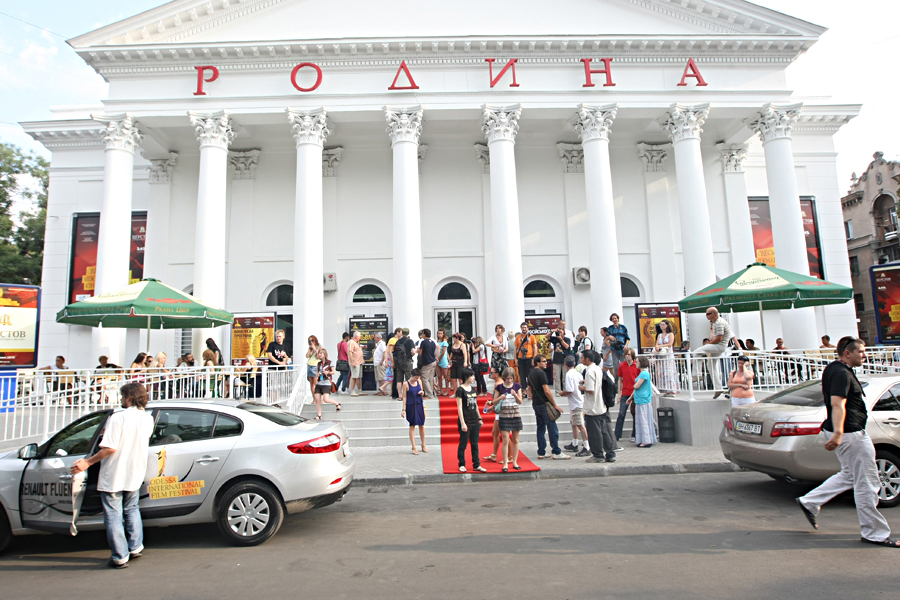
Festival Center at the Rodina cinema

The festival screenings cover three main venues: the Festival Palace, the Festival Center at the Rodina cinema, and the Stella Artois Green Theater. Also, since 2019, the Multiplex cinema has become one of the festival grounds.

The main festival prize – "The Golden Duke" – an updated version of the eponymous prize created by the noted Odesa sculptor Mykhailo Reva for the Golden Duke film festival held in Odesa in 1988. For the first two years, the main prize of the Odesa Film Festival was awarded based on the jury's decision. Since 2012, the Grand Prix of the Odesa Film Festival has been awarded according to the results of the audience vote.

The festival has an International jury that evaluates the International Competition Program and awards prizes for Best Feature Film, Best Director, Best Acting. In 2012 the festival added another competition program – the Ukrainian National Competition, in which the prize for the best Ukrainian film is decided by the Jury of the National Competition program. Since 2016, the Jury of the European Documentary Film Competition has been choosing the best documentary.

The first festival was attended by over 40 thousand audience members. In the following year, this number increased to over 70 thousand viewers. At the third Odesa Film Festival in 2012, the screenings were attended by about 100,000 spectators, about 4,500 guests and 700 accredited media representatives. The audience of the opening and closing ceremonies was about 3 million people, the program featured 85 films from 40 countries.

Within the framework of the festival, a special project is also developing dynamically – a film school: a series of masterclasses conducted by famous festival guests for students of the film industry and film lovers. The second festival also had an educational direction – "Script Workshop" Interschool ": workshops for a limited number of screenwriters, who were pre-selected in the script competition. At the third festival in 2012, the School of Film Critics operated within the film school.

Later, new directions for film professionals under the auspices of the Film Industry Office appeared at the Odesa Film Festival, including the summer and winter Film Markets, the pitching of completed projects and projects in development ("Work in progress"), and series projects ("EastSeries") as well.

In 2011, on its closing day, the Odesa Film Festival received an award from the authoritative international community of journalists – the Hollywood Foreign Press Association (HFPA), which awards the Golden Globe Award. The honorary award of the festival was presented by HFPA member Gabriel Lerman.

The Fourth Odesa Film Festival took place from 12 to 20 July 2013. Among the innovations was the establishment of a new prize for the best Ukrainian short film. A retrospective of Serhiy Paradzhanov's movies also took place at the 4th festival.

Since 2016, the festival has had a video room in which one can watch films of competition programs. The festival also awards "The Golden Duke" for the contribution to cinematography, which in 2017 was awarded to actress Isabelle Huppert and director Agnieszka Holland, and in 2018 – to actresses Ada Rogovtseva and Jacqueline Bisset. At the 10th Odesa Film Festival, the winners of the award were British stage and film director Mike Leigh and the legend of French cinematography, a special guest of the 10th anniversary OIFF, actress Catherine Deneuve. Also, during the anniversary of the 10th OIFF, two honorary statuettes were presented to the Odesa Film Studio on the occasion of its 100th anniversary and the famous satirist Mykhailo Zhvanetsky, who is a regular guest and friend of the festival.

During the 8th OIFF within the Film Industry Office section, in addition to the traditional pitching of feature films and presentations of motion pictures at the Work in Progress stage, the Odesa IFF ScripTeast Series Projects competition and Actor's Workshop took place.

Due to the ongoing Russo-Ukrainian War, the Karlovy Vary International Film Festival in the Czech Republic will be hosting parts of the OIFF in July 2022 and Prishtina Film Fest in Kosovo will be the host of the Film Festival in Pristina. In 2023, due to Russia's invasion of Ukraine, the festival was held in Chernivtsi.

== Board ==
As of 2019, the festival management consists of:

- Viktoria Tigipko (President)
- Yuliia Sinkevych (General Producer)
- Yuliia Sharko (administrative director)
- Anna Machukh (Business Development Director)
- Oleksandr Kholodenko (executive director)

== The structure of the festival ==
=== Competition program ===
The festival has three competition programs: the International Feature Film Competition Program, the National Competition Program and the European Documentary Film Competition .

The films allowed to participate in the European Documentary Competition are selected from feature-length documentaries, which were made in full or within the framework of international co-production with production entities from the following countries: Austria, Albania, Armenia, the Republic of Belarus, Belgium, Bulgaria, Bosnia and Herzegovina, Great Britain, Hungary, Germany, Greece, Georgia, Denmark, Israel, Ireland, Iceland, Spain, Italy, Cyprus, Kosovo, Lithuania, Luxembourg, Macedonia, Netherlands, Norway, Poland, Portugal, Russia, Romania, Serbia, Slovakia, Slovenia, Turkey, Ukraine, Finland, France, Croatia, Czech Republic, Switzerland, Sweden, Estonia.

The International Competition Program selects new feature films completed after 1 January of the current year, and whose premieres have not yet taken place on the territory of Ukraine at the time of the beginning of the festival.

The selection of films is carried out by a selection committee, and the main selection criterion is a film of high artistic level, designed for a wide audience, which is the main concept of the international competition program. New feature films shot between 1 January of the previous year and which have not yet been shown in Ukraine are selected for the competition.

The National Competition will feature Ukrainian short-length and feature-length films completed after 1 January of the previous year.

Film format – film (35 mm) or digital (DCP).

1,110 films from 40 countries of the three continents were submitted to participate in the 10th anniversary Odesa International Film Festival. 12 films-participants of the International Competition competed for the main prize – Grand Prix; 5 feature and 10 short films took part in the National Competition Program, 8 – in the European Documentary Film Competition. In total, about a hundred films were shown in the festival's competition and non-competition programs.

=== Jury ===
The films of the competition program are evaluated by an international jury, which includes film and cultural figures, famous directors, actors, film critics, film producers. The composition of the jury is determined by the festival management.

From 2010 to 2012, the jury of the International Federation of Film Clubs FICC, which awarded its own prize "Don Quixote", as well as the National Jury of Film Critics, the jury "Ukrainian Laboratory" (Mykola Shustov Award for Best Ukrainian Film) worked with the international jury.

Since 2016, the festival had the Jury of the International Competition Program, the Jury of the National Competition Program, the Jury of the European Documentary Film Competition and the Jury of the International Film Press Federation (FIPRESCI), and within the professional section – the Jury of Pitching and Work in Progress.

=== Prizes ===
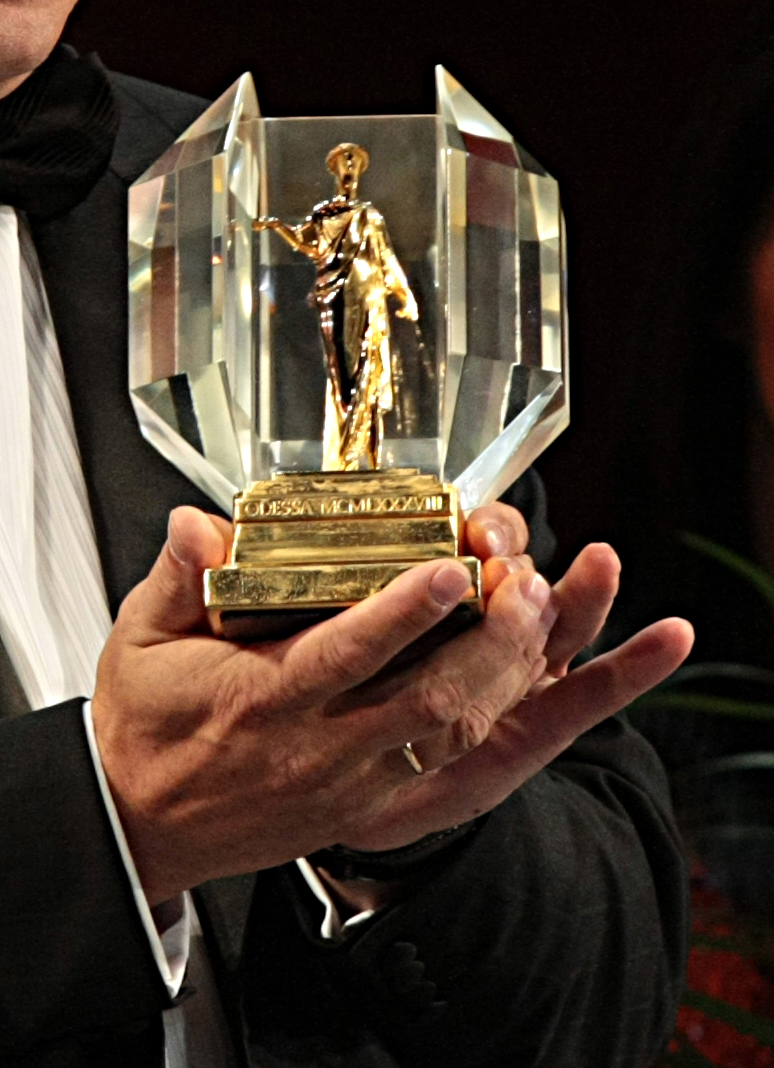
The "Golden Duke"

The Grand Prix, the main prize of the Odesa Film Festival – a "Golden Duke" statuette and a monetary award of 10,000 EUR – are awarded to the director of the film by the results of the audience vote. In 2019, the Audience Choice Award of the National Competition Program was introduced, the winner of which is also determined by audience voting

The International Jury awards prizes in the following categories (two additional special awards can be presented):

- Best Film (a monetary award of 5,000 EUR and "The Duke OIFF" statuette ("The Duke of Odesa International Film Festival")
- Best Director (a monetary award of 3,000 EUR and "The Duke OIFF" statuette)
- Best Actor/Actress (a monetary award of 2,000 EUR EUR and "The Duke OIFF" statuette to the actor/actress)

National Film Critics jury presents prizes in the following categories:

- Best Ukrainian Feature Film (a monetary award of 100,000 UAH and "The Golden Duke" statuette)
- Best Ukrainian Short Film (a monetary award of 50,000 UAH and "The Duke OIFF" statuette)
- Best Ukrainian Director (a monetary award of 60,000 UAH and "The Duke OIFF" statuette)
- Best National Actor/Actress (a monetary award of 50,000 UAH and "The Duke OIFF" statuette)

National Film Critics jury can also present two additional awards

- Special Jury Mention
- Viewers' Choice Award – the organizers of the festival hold audience balloting to determine the recipient of this award.

Since 2016, during the Festival, The European Documentary Competition is also held. The European Documentary Jury presents the award – The Golden Duke (along with a monetary award of 2,000 EUR to the director

Starting in 2011, alongside the main festival prizes, the festival also awards the "Don Quixote" prize (awarded by the International Film Association Federation), the National Film Critics' prize, the "Mykola Shustov" prize (awarded to the best Ukrainian film according to the "Ukrainian Laboratory" jury,) and a Best Project prize (awarded to the wonder of the pitching contest).

== Non-competitive program ==
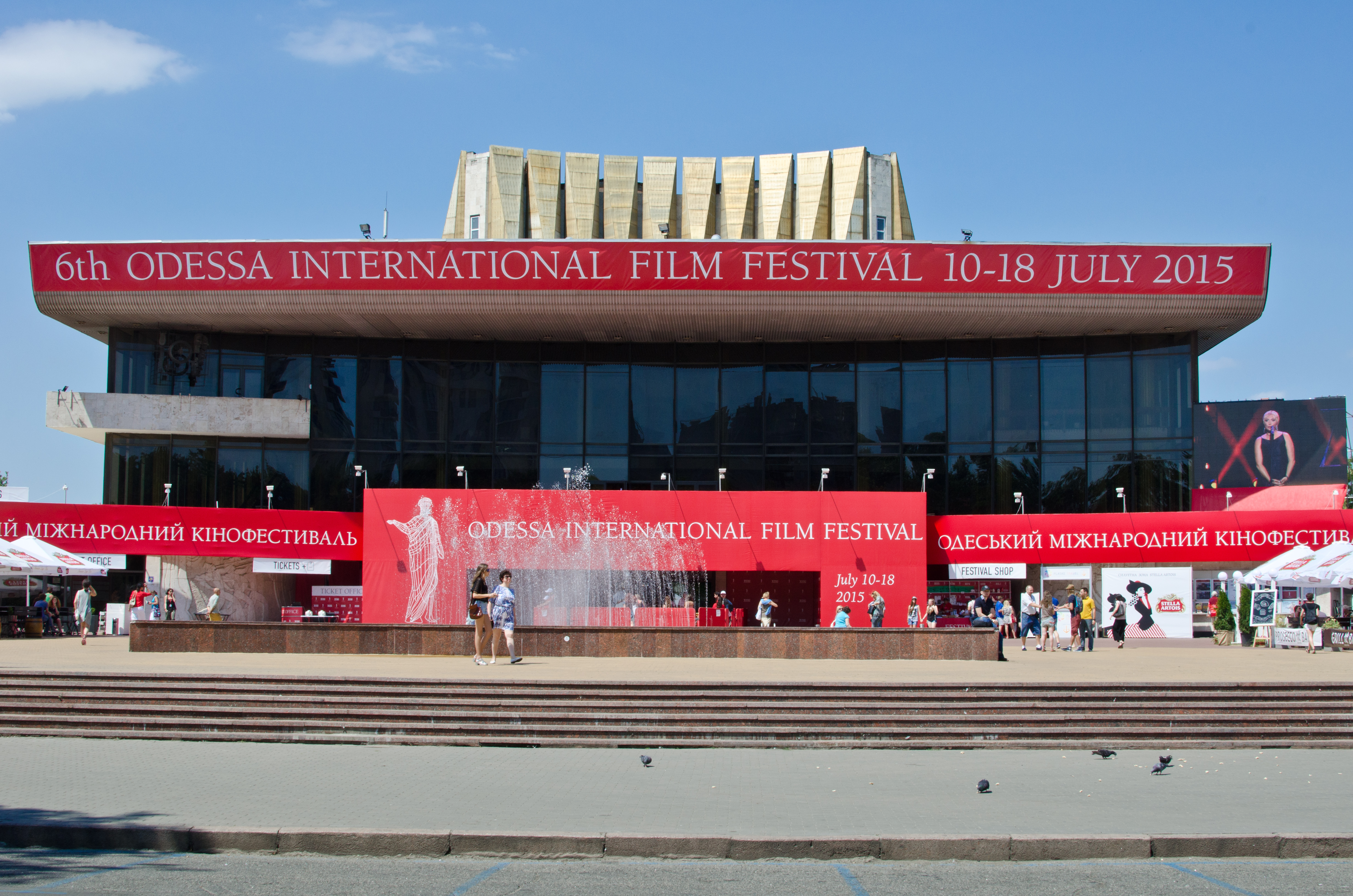
Festival palace

The non-competitive program follows a structure familiar to many film events – a "Festival of Festivals". The films screened include the latest hits of world festivals, retrospectives and exclusive premieres ("Gala Premieres". section) of the more noteworthy works of film art shown in the category of "Special Screenings". This portion of the program also includes screenings of works of national cinematography ("The French Panorama", "Odesa Focus", "Ukrainian Retrospective")

== Potemkin Stairs Open-air ==
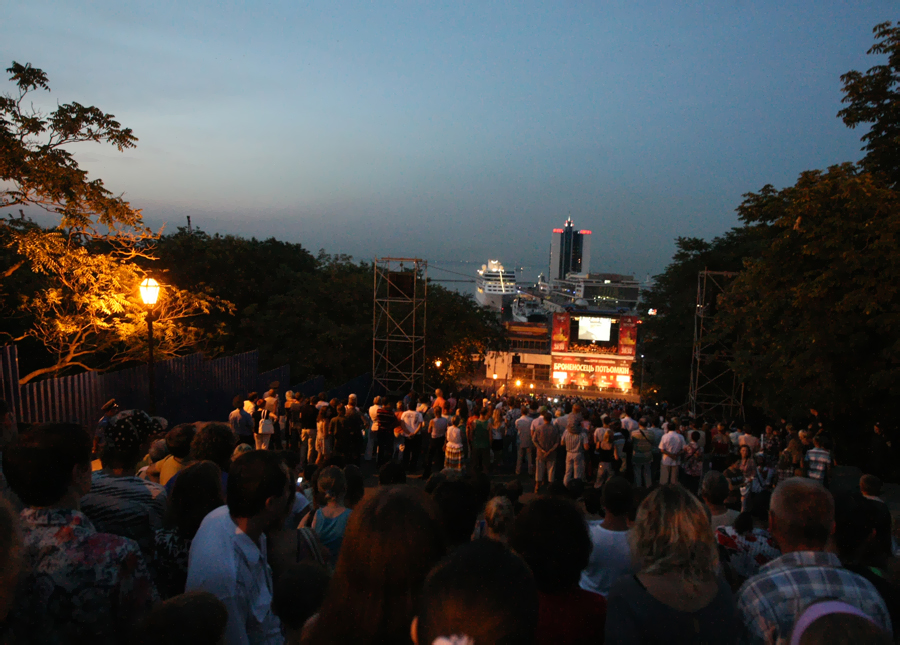
Film concert "Battleship Potemkin" at the Potemkin Stairs as part of the First Odesa Film Festival-2010

Perhaps the most noted of all festival events is its open-air screenings on the Potemkin Stairs which are transformed into a screening venue for one festival evening. During the first OIFF, crowds of viewers marveled at Sergei Eisenstein's masterpiece "Battleship Potemkin" to the accompaniment of a live symphonic orchestra. This grand affair set the tone for later festival open-air events. In 2011, the Potemkin Stairs, again with a full symphonic orchestra, welcomed Fritz Lang's 1927 masterpiece "Metropolis" for which over two thousand viewers assembled on the stairs.

In 2012, at the third festival, at the Potemkin Stairs, the symphony orchestra accompanied the screening of Charlie Chaplin's "Lights of the Big City," which was presented to the audience by his daughter, actress Geraldine Chaplin. In 2013, the film poem "Sunrise: A Song of Two Humans" by Friedrich Murnau was shown. Alfred Hitchcock's film "Blackmail" was shown at the Potemkin Stairs as part of the 5th OIFF. During the 6th OIFF, in 2015, there was a screening of the film "Man with a Movie Camera" by Dzyga Vertov, and in 2016 – "Sherlock Holmes" by Arthur Bertelet to the music of Donald Sosin accompanied by a symphony orchestra. During the 8th OIFF, the Potemkin Stairs screened Julien Duvivier's 1930 film "The Ladies' Delight" based on Émile Zola's novel of the same name. The show was accompanied by the music of Canadian composer Gabriel Thibodeau, vocal parts were performed by soloist Sophie Fournier.

The second OIFF gave the audiences another open-air venue – The Langeronovskiy Descent, where nightly films were screened for audiences underneath the night sky. Since 2017 instead of Langeronovskiy Descent screenings took place at Odesa Green Theatre in Shevchenko Park.

At the festival in 2014, a fundraiser was held for Ukrainian director Oleg Sentsov, illegally convicted and imprisoned in Russia.

In 2019, on the occasion of the anniversary of the festival, two open-air performances took place on the Potemkin Stairs. On 13 July, the cult film "Cossacks" (1928) produced by MGM was shown to the audience at the Potemkin Stairs. And on 19 July, the guests of the OIFF saw Vlad Troitsky's unique musical media-performance opera "Stairs to ...". This show was created specifically for the anniversary Odesa International Film Festival. Open-air screenings were also waiting for the audience at the Green Theater – in particular, on the 6th day of the film festival, a German film, a classic of silent cinema, " The Cabinet of Dr. Caligari" by Robert Wiene was shown. A special performance at the Green Theater was accompanied by a performance by the British musical trio The Tiger Lillies

== Professional events ==
Film Industry Office (Pitch/Work in Progress)

The Film Industry Office section was established as a platform for professional communication, support and development of Ukrainian film projects and the film industry in general, as well as for the presentation of the Ukrainian film industry to the international community.

The section includes pitching of feature film projects that are at the pre-production stage, as well as presentations of Work in Progress projects – feature films in the final stage of production, scheduled for cinematic screening.

Participants in the section can be distributors, buyers, festival selectors, representatives of film establishments and specialized film companies, investors, filmmakers (actors, directors, screenwriters, cameramen, production artists), producers.

Movie market (winter and summer)

OIFF also holds two film markets annually – in winter and summer. OIFF Film Market is a professional communication platform for distributors, representatives of cinemas, film studios, and companies that provide rental and other services. In 2017–2018, Anna Machukh was the director of the Odesa International Film Festival Film Market.

== Summer Film School ==
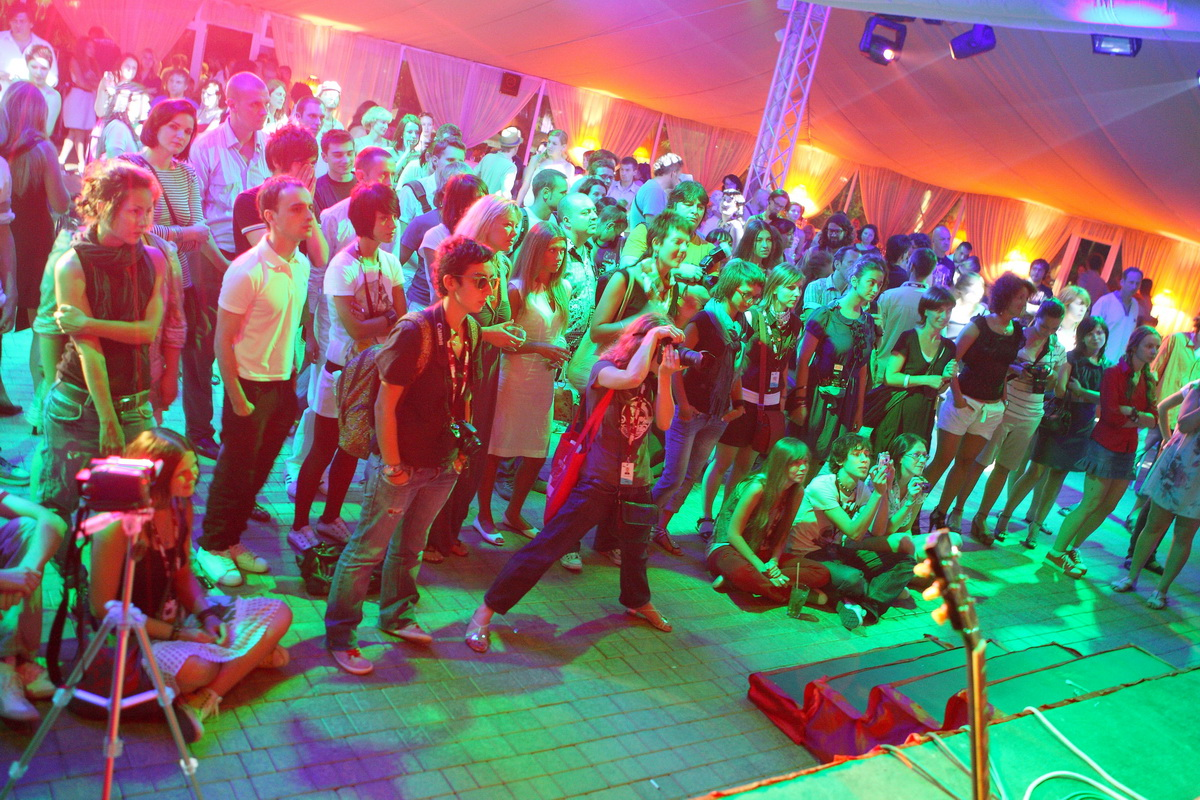
Summer Film School

The Summer Film School program was established for students of film schools and other types of learning establishments who consider themselves lovers of the film arts.

During the daytime, the U-Cinema Theater on the property of the Odesa Film Studio, serves as a forum for master-classes organized for the members of the Summer Film School. Lectures and discussions are led by world cinema industry professionals – guests of the festival. In the evenings, this and other theaters serve as screening venues for the festival program. In the later evenings, members of the Summer School participate in parties and other festivities.

In the course of the first Odesa Film Festival master classes were given by Hollywood actors Rutger Hauer and John Malkovich; directors Krzysztof Zanussi, Otar Ioseliani, Vadim Perelman, Kira Muratova, Darren Aronofsky, Christian Petzold, Jos Stelling. and Aleksander Mitta; actor Jerzy Stuhr, film connoisseur Naum Kleiman and others.

The Summer Film School students were eligible for discount tickets to all festival screenings as well as lodging in the festival tent-city on a separate property near the Odesa Film Studio. During the nighttime hours, DJ parties and other events were organized.

Since 2016, the type of festival accreditation "Summer Film School" has not been used. Also, similarly to the Summer Film School, a series of educational events under this name was last held in 2016 at the 7th OIFF. However, master classes and creative meetings are held during the festival and entry is simplified – you can reserve a seat with any type of accreditation.

== Evening parties ==
Vibrant evening parties serve as conclusions to busy OIFF days. These parties are held at beach clubs on the Odesa seacoast or restaurants. These events present opportunities for informal mingling between festival participants and the enjoyment of various shows and presentations.

The venues offer entertainment from elite jazz evenings to public concerts of bands and DJs. Entrance to festival parties is free to all holders of OIFF badges.

== Criticism ==
Criticism of the pro-Russian nature of the festival

Formally, the festival positions itself as "Ukrainian", although some film critics have previously accused it of being "pro-Russian". For example, at the 2nd OIFF, most of the tapes at the festival were with subtitles in Russian, but since 2014 the festival's program department has abandoned Russian-language subtitles, leaving subtitles exclusively in Ukrainian and English.

Geng Jun, the director of "Free and Easy" that took part in a competitive program in 2018, said: "During the presentation of my film, I paid attention to Ukrainian subtitles and felt a great pleasure. If the film is also translated into Ukrainian, it will be incredible." Describing the results of the 2nd OIFF (2011), Valentyna Klymenko, a film critic for the newspaper "Ukrayina Moloda" ("Young Ukraine"), stated that only Russian subtitles were present in almost all films and noted with regret that it was possible to get headphones with simultaneous Ukrainian translation by "pledging your passport or driver's or journalist's license. Tolerant."

Commenting on the 6th OIFF (2015), the director and founder of the Ukrainian Film Club, Professor of Linguistics at Columbia University (USA) Yuri Shevchuk in his article "Odesa International Film Festival: a parade of Russian glamor" in the Telekrytyka magazine explores OIFF strategies, its program, language, and image policy. The author questioned the "Ukrainianness" of the film festival, criticizing the dominance of Russianness in it (Russian-speaking presenters, Russian-language titles in films, etc.) and noted that "only by becoming Ukrainian in form and content, the Odesa Film Festival will finally become truly international." Later, in a comment to Hromadske Radio, Shevchuk noted that "the Odesa festival lacks self-awareness in the non-provincial dimensions. It insists on its Russianness ". He also emphasizes that " the festival has a fantastic potential if it realizes itself as the gateway to the Ukrainian national cinematography. "

Remark of the president of the festival about the "civil war in Ukraine"

During the opening of the 8th OIFF (2017), OIFF President and Co-founder Viktoria Tigipko mentioned the "civil war in Ukraine." The reaction of the Ukrainian public to this statement was extremely negative, and later many Ukrainians took to social media to express their indignation at Victoria Tigipko's story to foreign guests of the film festival about the "civil war in Ukraine". Tigipko later stated that her words were "interpreted out of context" and that she was only trying to use terminology familiar to foreign festival guests.

== Winners ==
Following are the winners of the Odesa International Film Festival:

Grand Prix – Audience Award "Golden Duke" for the Best Film

Year	Film	Directed by	Country	Ref
2010	"Minors under 16..."	Andrey Kavun	Russia	
2011	"Tomboy"	Céline Sciamma	France	
2011	"Almanya: Welcome to Germany"	Yasemin Şamdereli	Germany	
2012	"Broken"	Rufus Norris	Great Britain	
2013	"The Geographer Drank His Globe Away"	Alexander Veledinsky	Russia	
2014	"Zero Motivation"	Talya Lavie	Israel	
2015	"Mustang"	Deniz Gamze Ergüven	France; Turkey; Germany; Qatar	
2016	"Burn Burn Burn"	Chanya Button	Great Britain	—N/a
2017	"King of the Belgians"	Peter Brosens; Jessica Woodworth	Belgium; Netherlands; Bulgaria	
2018	"Crystal Swan"	Darya Zhuk	Belarus	—N/a
2019 (tie)	"Homeward"	Nariman Aliev	Ukraine	
2019 (tie)	"And Then We Danced"	Levan Akin	Georgia	
2020	"Dinner in America"	Adam Rehmeier	United States	
2021	"Stop-Zemlia"	Kateryna Gornostai	Ukraine	
2023	"In the Rearview"	Maciek Hamela	Poland	
2026	To Die to Live	Yuliia Hontaruk	Ukraine, Slovakia, Latvia	
