= Agostino Imondi =

Sicilian documentary film director

- Born: Basel, Switzerland
- Occupation: Filmmaker
- Years active: 2000–present

'Agostino Imondi is an Italian documentary film director.

== Early life and education ==
Agostini Imondi was born in Basel, Switzerland.

He studied film direction in Rome, Italy.

== Career ==
Imondi started his career in the media industry in Australia in 2000, starting as a volunteer camera operator and editor for Melbourne community TV station Channel 31.

Over the years, Imondi collaborated under the pseudonym Videoteppista with various guerilla film groups and grassroots medias, including SKA TV in Melbourne, Indymedia Italy, and Berlin-based videoactivist collective Ak-Kraak.

His first documentary, Waking up the Nation (2002, 2005), a guerilla film, told the story of a group of Australian] human rights activists, who travel on an old bus, the Freedom Bus, to visit asylum seekers imprisoned in immigration detention centres across the country. Shot and released in Australia in 2002, the film was primarily used by Australian human rights groups for their campaigns.

Upon his return to Europe, Imondi re-edited the documentary for international audiences, where the film had limited screenings in German movie theatres, as well as being screened at some international film festivals.

In 2003 he worked with British director Christina Hotz on the Dutch-South African co-production Orange Farm Water Crisis, which deals with water privatisation in the South African township of Orange Farm. The short documentary was screened at various film festivals around the world.

After moving to Berlin he worked as editor on Unsere Mutter (Our Mother), an experimental film by Iranian filmmakers Kia Kiarostami and Daryush Shokof, shot by Kiarostami and fellow Iranian director Bahman Ghobadi.

In 2006 he started research for a new documentary, which later would become the film Neukölln Unlimited, co-directed with the German director Dietmar Ratsch. For this movie he won a Crystal Bear at the 60th Berlin International Film Festival in 2010.

Some of his short documentaries and current affairs stories have been broadcast on AlJazeera, arte, C31 Melbourne, and RBB. He had also worked as freelance video editor for other filmmakers.

== Filmography (as director) ==
- 2002: Waking Up The Nation
- 2003: Orange Farm Water Crisis
- 2010: Neukölln Unlimited

== Awards and nominations ==
- 2003: Winner, Best Video, Festival dei Diritti, Italy, for Orange Farm Water Crisis
- 2010: Winner, Crystal Bear for best Feature Film, 60th Berlin International Film Festival for Neukölln Unlimited
- 2010: Nominated, Peace Film Award, for Neukölln Unlimited - (lost to Mohamed Al-Daradji for Son of Babylon)
- 2010: Winner, Buster Award for best Documentary, Buster Film Festival, Copenhagen
- 2010: Winner, 1st Prize for Feature Documentary, Chicago International Children's Film Festival
- 2011: Nominated, German Documentary Award - (lost to Wim Wenders for Pina)
- 2011: Nominated, German Film Critics Award - (lost to Hajo Schomerus for Im Haus meines Vaters sind viele Wohnungen)
- 2011: Winner, MovieSquad All Rights Award, Movies That Matter Film Festival, The Hague won
