= Hassan Akkouch =

German actor

Hassan Akkouch (born 1988) is a Lebanese German actor, known for his roles in Tatort (2013), Verbrechen Nach Ferdinand von Schirach (2013), and Der Kriminalist (2006). He also participated in Neukölln Unlimited (2010), a German documentary about immigrant youth living in a neglected urban area in Berlin, Germany.

== Early life ==
Akkouch was born in Lebanon. He was two years old when he fled with his family to the Neukölln district of Berlin, Germany. In Germany, the family has been threatened by ongoing deportations. Three years of this event (2006–2009) are described in the documentary Neukölln Unlimited by Agostino Imondi and Dietmar Ratsch.

== Film career ==
Tatort

In an April 3, 2013 episode of Tatort (the long-running German language television crime drama series), Akkouch plays the role of Tarek Birol. In this episode, the four-member "Tatort" team determines in the case of a 16-year-old high school student who is found dead in Phoenix Lake. The first two episodes generated great audience interest and made for wider discussion.

Neukolln Unlimited

Neukölln Unlimited is a 2010 German documentary co-produced by the German broadcaster RBB in collaboration with the Franco-German cultural channel Arte. Financial support for the documentary came from the German Federal Film Board, DFFF, Medienboard Berlin-Brandenburg, as well as from MFG Baden-Württemberg and the MEDIA Programme of the European Union. The film was awarded the Crystal Bear at the Berlinale 2010.

The documentary follows the daily lives of three siblings of the Lebanese Akkouch family: Hassan (18), Lial (19), and Maradona (14), who are successful musicians and breakdancers in the Neukölln district of Berlin. They grow up with a passion for Hip Hop and streetdance, but pressure is put on the two teenagers when a rivalry arises about who should be the family's main breadwinner. In the meantime, Maradona gets himself into more and more trouble until he is suspended from school. He is at a crossroads between his siblings’ ambitious lifestyle and the street life of his friends. However, a surprising qualification for a TV-casting show could prove to be a turning point in his life. If he wins the €100,000 prize money, he may be the one who saves the family. Neukölln Unlimited can best be described as a musical film that deals with the topic of integration of immigrant youth living in neglected urban areas. This documentary goes beyond the typical clichés about migrants in ‘problem’ areas to portray the everyday lives of three youths struggling for their family's right to stay in Germany.

Verbrechen Nach Ferdinand von Schirach

In this crime drama, Hassan plays the role of Abbas Fortas. A young woman lies dead on a luxurious hotel bed, slain with a heavy lamp which was resting on one of the nightstands. An envelope with €500 in cash is left at the scene. One of the wealthiest men in the city gets tangled up in the story, and he finally admits to having had a "financial arrangement" with the victim. Nevertheless, he insists he has nothing to do with her death – he left the hotel long before the discovery of the corpse. A security camera in the hotel garage seems to refute his statement until it is discovered that the camera clock always runs at winter time, and the crime took place in the summer.

== Awards ==
- Crystal Bear at the Berlinale 2010
