= No Fags =

2021 film directed by Mirek Balonis and Jutta Riedel

- German: Tunten zwecklos
- Directed by: Mirek Balonis, Jutta Riedel
- Written by: Mirek Balonis, Jutta Riedel
- Produced by: Mirek Balonis, Jutta Riedel
- Starring: Hamburger Bollenmädels
- Cinematography: Mirek Balonis
- Edited by: Mirek Balonis, Jutta Riedel
- Music by: Mirek Balonis
- Release date: October 23, 2021 (Hamburg International Queer Film Festival)
- Running time: 83 minutes
- Country: German
- Language: German

No Fags (German: Tunten zwecklos) is a 2021 German documentary film directed by Mirek Balonis and Jutta Riedel about the Hamburg Bollenmädels, a group of homosexual friends. The film premiered on 23 October 2021, at the Hamburg International Queer Film Festival in Hamburg and was shown in selected German cinemas from 9 November 2023.

== Synopsis ==
The film follows the Hamburg Bollenmädels group over an extended period of time and portrays its nine members. Animated sequences complement filmic observations and interviews, which deal with their childhood, their (early or late) coming out, their relationship with their parents, their sexuality, experiences in the West German gay scene, the discrimination and stigmatization of homosexuals by society, the violence against them, the emergence of AIDS and the associated propaganda and repression by politics and the media against homosexual people in West Germany. The Bollenmädels also address their role in the German queer community today. One of the protagonists says that, as a gay man, he is "old hat" and that the term "gay" is "too one-sided" for younger LGBTQI people. They would prefer the term "queer".

The Hamburg Bollenmädels represent many German homosexuals who came out in the West German provinces in the early 1980s and escaped the conservative climate there. One member of the group provocatively poses the question of whether fags can "represent the gays" from the perspective of other homosexuals. After all, No Fags, the title of the film, used to appear frequently in the personal ads of German gay print media. The following descriptions by the Bollenmädels suggest that, in addition to the discrimination faced by society as a whole, fags were also rejected by parts of the West German gay scene.

Most of the current group members of the Bollenmädels met in Hamburg at the end of the 1980s and became friends. They have very different professions. In 1995, the men founded the group as part of Christopher Street Day. In addition to monthly meetings, they like to perform as Schwarzwaldmädel at Hamburg Pride, the Hamburg CSD, but also in various Hamburg clubs and scene meeting places, but also in a variety of self-designed costumes, which always have a visual reference to the original Bollenmädel costume.

The Bollenmädels' commitment to an open and free society continues to this day. In 2018, at an official invitation, the group presented Manneken Pis with a self-made dirndl with a Bollenhut. The Bollenmädels' dirndl is the first female costume in the 400-year history of the Brussels landmark Manneken Pis. The dressing up on site spontaneously developed into a multicultural street party. This event also forms the conclusion of the documentary.

== Production ==
Filmmakers Mirek Balonis and Jutta Riedel realized No Fags with their Cologne-based production company Trawa Film. Filming took place in Belgium and Germany from July 2018 to March 2020. They received the money for the production and distribution of the film through a crowdfunding campaign and from the German film funding Film- und Medienstiftung NRW.

== Reception ==
The reviews of the film so far have been positive. The German LGBTI online magazine Queer.de, for example, considered No Fags one of the "most exciting films of 2022" and Toby Frei from German ka-news praised the two filmmakers' "sensitive interviews".

Some prominent cultural figures also praised the film. Some of their comments are included in the press material for the film.

German director and screenwriter Wieland Speck, for example, gained the following insight from the film: "I knew nothing about the Bollenmädels and so your film (addressed to the filmmakers) is a beautiful piece of history and contemporary history." And he also states: "I think it's very important to show the subcultural pieces of the puzzle and thus the connections between emancipation, without which there would be no larger movement. The animations also raise the whole thing to a more universal level and the individual stories of the protagonists also provide a picture of the societies of origin, which include the change in family understanding, as the film shows."

The co-founder of the political gay and lesbian movement in the Federal Republic of Germany and filmmaker Rosa von Praunheim recommended the film for a cinema audience and praised it as an "excellent and affectionate portrait of the original group of friends and activists 'Bollenmädels' from Hamburg."

== Accolades (Selection) ==
- 2022: Jury Prize in the category Best Documentary at the Romanian Wallachia International Film Festival
- 2022: Best first time director documentary award at the French Festival du Cinema de Paris
- 2023: Best LGBTQ Award at the Czech Brno Film Festival
- 2023: Best Queer Award at the Spanish C L I M A X Festival Internacional de Cinema Independiente
- 2023: Award Best feature-length Documentary at the Scottish film festival Close:Up Edinburgh Docufest
