= Alisa Kovalenko =

Ukrainian filmmaker (born 1987)

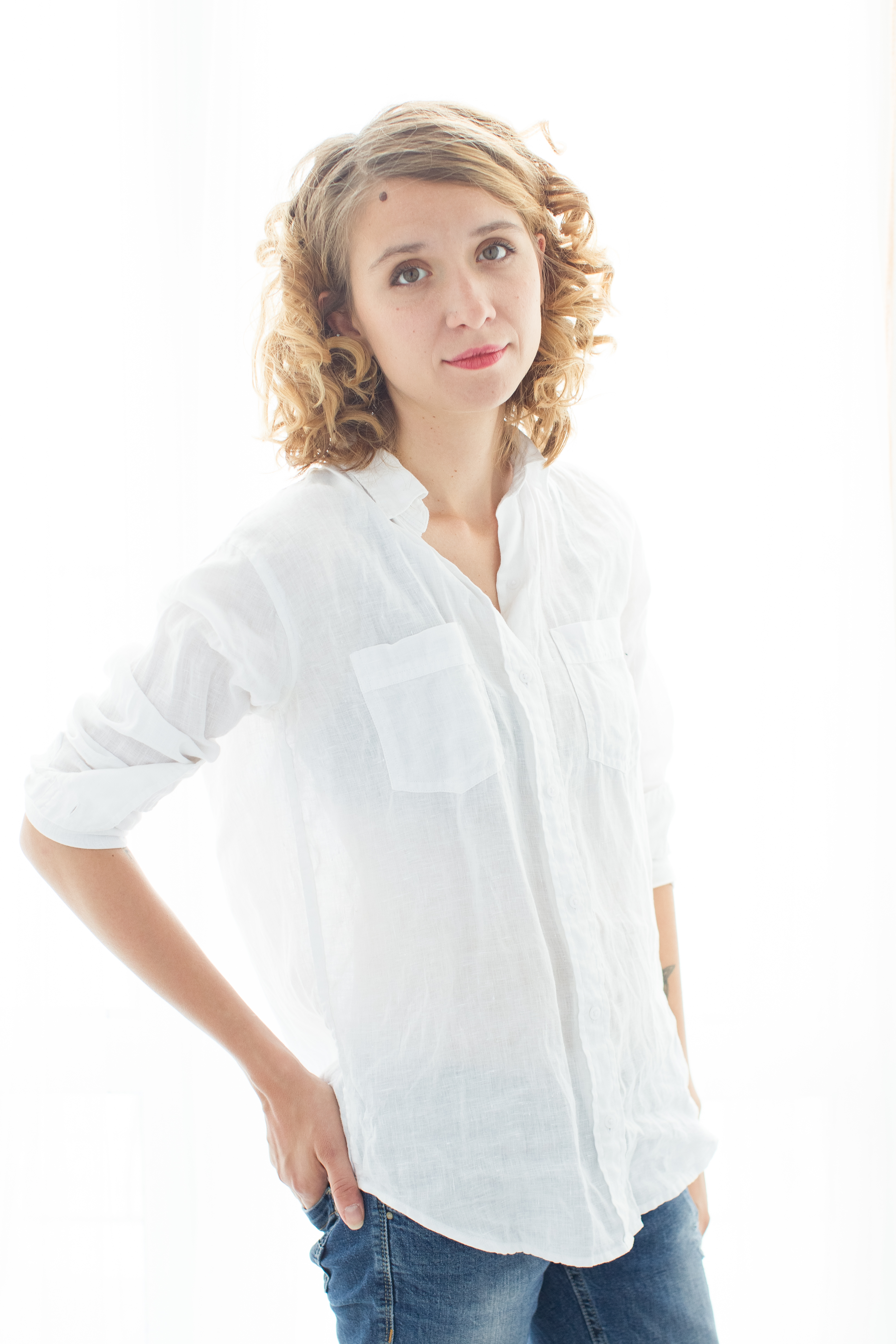
- Alisa Kovalenko
- Born: September 24, 1987 (age 38); Zaporizhzhia, Ukraine
- Citizenship: Ukraine
- Occupations: Documentarian; Film producer
- Known for: We Will Not Fade Away
- Children: 1

Alisa Kovalenko (born September 24, 1987) is a Ukrainian documentary filmmaker and ex-soldier in the Ukrainian Voluntary Army. Her films have focused on Russia's invasion of Ukraine both during the 2014 annexation of Crimea and the full-scale Russian invasion of Ukraine in 2022.

She is known for films such as We Will Not Fade Away (2023) and Alisa in Warland (2015).

== Early life and education ==
Alisa Kovalenko was born in Zaporizhia, Ukraine in 1987. In Kyiv, she studied documentary filmmaking at the Karpenko-Karyi University and then went on to study at the Wajda Film School in Warsaw, Poland.

== Career ==
In 2014, while still a film student, she made her first film, Sestra Zo about a former soccer player. In 2015, her first feature-length documentary, Alisa in Warland, premiered at the International Documentary Film Festival Amsterdam. The footage came about when Kovalenko traveled to the front line of the war in Donbas during Russia's annexation of Crimea in 2014. It was co-directed by Liubov Durakova.

In 2018, her second documentary, Home Games, which centered around a 20-year-old female soccer player from a poor family, premiered at IDFA.

In 2019, Kovalenko's experiences in Donbas lead her to begin a documentary film about the lives of teenagers in the war torn area and an opportunity five of them had to travel to the Himalayas. In 2023, the final film We Will Not Fade Away premiered at the 73rd Berlin International Film Festival.

Originally, We Will Not Fade Away was going to have a very different tone, but the Russian Invasion of Ukraine completely changed the project. Following the Russian occupation, some of those in the film safely fled, but at the time of the release, two of the leads of the film were unaccounted for. Kovalenko said that the experience made her feel "powerless as a documentary filmmaker."

The full-scale Russian invasion of Ukraine in 2022 prompted Kovalenko to join the Ukrainian Volunteer Army (before production of We Will Not Fade Away was complete) saying, "I promised myself if a war ... will cover all Ukraine, then I will fight not with my camera but with a gun." After her tour, she finished editing We Will Not Fade Away and then turned new footage from the frontlines into the film My Dear Theo, a video diary for her young son, which premiered in the main competition at CPH:DOX in 2025.

Her latest film Traces is co-directed by Marysia Nikitchuk and focuses on conflict-related sexual violence (CRSV) due to Russia's invasion of Ukraine. The film premiered at the Berlin Filmfestival of 2026 and was nominated for best documentary feature.

== Activism ==
Kovalenko is a member of SEMA Ukraine, which advocates for survivors of conflict-related sexual violence. During the war in Donbas, Kovalenko was sexually assaulted by Russian-backed forces. She has said that many cases go unspoken and wants to help other survivors with her work and by being open about her experience and the realities of the Russian invasion.

== Accolades ==
Since 2019 Kovalenko has been a member of the European Film Academy.

== Personal life ==
She is married to producer Stéphane Siohan and together they have one son.

== Filmography ==
- Sestra Zo (2014)
- Alisa in Warland (2015) co-directed with Liubov Durakova
- Home Match (2017, Short)
- Home Games (2018)
- Girl Away from Home (2023, Short)
- We Will Not Fade Away (2023)
- My Dear Theo (2025)
- Trances (2026)
