= Timestamp (film) =

2025 documentary film by Kateryna Gornostai

- Festival release poster
- Ukrainian: Стрічка часу
- Literally: Ribbon of time
- Directed by: Kateryna Gornostai
- Screenplay by: Kateryna Gornostai
- Produced by: Olha Beskhmelnytsina; Natalia Libet; Viktor Shevchenko
- Starring: Olha Bryhynets; Borys Khovriak; Mykola Kolomiiets; Valeriia Hukova; Mykola Shpak
- Cinematography: Oleksandr Roshchyn
- Edited by: Nikon Romanchenko
- Music by: Alexey Shmurak
- Production companies: 2Brave Productions; Cinéphage Productions; a_BAHN; Rinkel Docs
- Distributed by: Best Friend Forever
- Release date: 20 February 2025 (Berlinale)
- Running time: 125 minutes
- Countries: Ukraine; France; Luxembourg; Netherlands
- Language: Ukrainian

Timestamp (Ukrainian: «Стрічка часу», romanized: Strichka chasu) is a 2025 documentary film written and directed by Kateryna Gornostai. The film is a mosaic of the everyday lives of teachers and students from different corners of Ukraine.

The international co-production between Ukraine, Luxembourg, Netherlands, and France, was selected in the Competition at the 75th Berlin International Film Festival, where it competed for the Golden Bear and had first screening on 20 February 2025 at Berlinale Palast.

== Content ==
Timestamp does not use voice-over, interviews, and re-enactments. Instead, it focuses on illustrating the profound impact of the war in Ukraine on daily life, capturing the challenges and hardships of living under constant threat.

In the words of the director Kateryna Gornostai,

"We focused on the everyday moments and simple school experiences, like tears during the first bell ceremony, a senior playing Saint Nicholas, and the colorful ribbons in the hands of graduates. All of this, of course, is set against the backdrop of war. Students often study in shelters due to air raids, the principal shows the damaged and sealed-off parts of the school while lessons continue in another wing, and an online graduation is marked by a bell taken out of Bakhmut. The war has permeated everyday life, but all we can do is continue living and learning."

Zoya Lytvyn, founder of Osvitoria said about the film, "We want to remind the world that the war in Ukraine continues, children and teachers are paying a devastating price for the fundamental right to education."

The film portrays school life in Cherkasy, Kharkiv, Borodianka, and Bucha in the Kyiv region, capturing the resilience and struggles of these communities. There is a moment in the film where, during a funeral in Romny, Sumy region, just two days prior, a Russian drone strike devastated the local school, tragically claiming the lives of the headmaster, deputy headmaster, librarian, and secretary.

== Cast ==
- Olha Bryhynets
- Borys Khovriak
- Mykola Kolomiiets
- Valeriia Hukova
- Mykola Shpak

== Production ==
The film is created by cinematographer Oleksandr Roshchyn, editor Nikоn Romachenko, and producers Olha Brehman (Beskhmelnytsina) and Nataliia Libet, and Viktor Shevchenko. It is the same team which worked in Kateryna Gornostai's 2021 film Stop-Zemlia.

It is produced by the Ukrainian company 2Brave Productions. The French Cinephage Productions, the Luxembourg company a_BAHN, and the Dutch Rinkel Docs are co-producers of the film. It is based on a concept of the Ukrainian educational organisation Osvitoria, who are executive producer of the documentary.

In February 2024, the film was selected to be a CPH:FORUM 2024 project.

== Release ==
Timestamp had its world premiere on 20 February 2025, as part of the 75th Berlin International Film Festival, in Competition.

It will be showcased in the official selection in documentary section at the Luxembourg City Film Festival on 8 March 2025. it was also part of Horizons section of the 59th Karlovy Vary International Film Festival, where it was screened from 4 July to 9 July 2025.

It was presented in the 'Standing with Ukraine' at the 29th Tallinn Black Nights Film Festival on 7 November 2025.

Brussels-based Best Friend Forever has acquired the rights of the documentary film, it is the only documentary selected for the main competition at the 75th Berlin International Film Festival.

The film was shortlisted alongwith other eight films as the Ukraine‘s Oscar submission for 98th Academy Awards.

== Accolades ==
Award	Date of ceremony	Category	Recipient	Result	Ref.
CPH:FORUM	21 March 2024	Eurimages New Lab Outreach Award	Timestamp	Won	
Berlin International Film Festival	23 February 2025	Golden Bear	Kateryna Gornostai	Nominated	
Berlin International Film Festival	23 February 2025	Berlinale Documentary Film Award	Timestamp	Nominated	
Warsaw Film Festival	19 October 2025	Free Spirit Audience Award	Timestamp	Won	

== See also ==
- Russo-Ukrainian War
- List of Ukrainian submissions for the Academy Award for Best International Feature Film
