= Forever-Forever =

2023 drama film

- Directed by: Anna Buryachkova
- Written by: Anna Buryachkova; Marina Stepanska
- Produced by: Vitalii Sheremetiev; Natalia Libet; Olexii Zgonik; Rinskje Raap; Reinier Selen; Lyuba Knorozok
- Starring: Alina Cheban; Zachary Shadrin
- Cinematography: Olena Chekhovska
- Edited by: Yuri Reznichenko
- Music by: Lika Bugaeva
- Release date: September 5, 2023 (Venice)
- Language: Ukrainian

Forever-Forever (Ukrainian: «Назавжди-назавжди«, romanized: Nazavzhdy-Nazavzhdy) is a 2023 coming-of-age drama film co-written and directed by Anna Buryachkova at her feature film debut. A co-production between Ukraine and Netherlands, it premiered in the Orizzonti Extra section at the 80th Venice International Film Festival, marking the festival's landmark 80th anniversary edition.

== Plot ==
After transferring from a downtown high school, Tonia joins a new badass gang of youngsters, trying to find protection and a place she truly belongs. They spend time together, roaming around Kyiv's post-socialist suburbs, having fun and getting in trouble. Soon, Tonia falls in love with Zhurik, whilst also longing for Sania and finds herself tangled up in an alluring secret love triangle. But Tonia's abusive past still haunts her, challenging this newfound friendship and romance. Will she be able to find her own path or lose herself in this new controversial relationship?

Set in the late 90s Kyiv, this is a story of the young and rebellious amid the ruins of the Soviet regime. Those who had to grow up faster due to the circumstances but got lost in the adult world. A story of which we need constant reminding, as some things only exist at the moment, while others last forever.

== Cast ==
- Zachary Shadrin as Dzhura
- Alina Cheban as Tonia
- Arthur Aliiev as Sania
- Yelyzaveta Tsilyk as Lera
- Daria Zhykharska as Ira
- Oleksandr Yatsenko

== Production ==
The film was penned during the 2020 COVID-19 quarantine. It was shot in Kyiv, with shootings being wrapped two weeks before the Russian invasion of Ukraine. The movie is released by DGTL RLGN Film Company.

== Release ==
The film had its world premiere on 5 September 2023 at the 80th Venice International Film Festival in the Orizzonti Extra section, as part of the festival's landmark 80th anniversary edition.

== Reception ==
The film was awarded best film at the 2023 FilmFestival Cottbus.
