= Kateryna Gornostai =

Ukrainian filmmaker

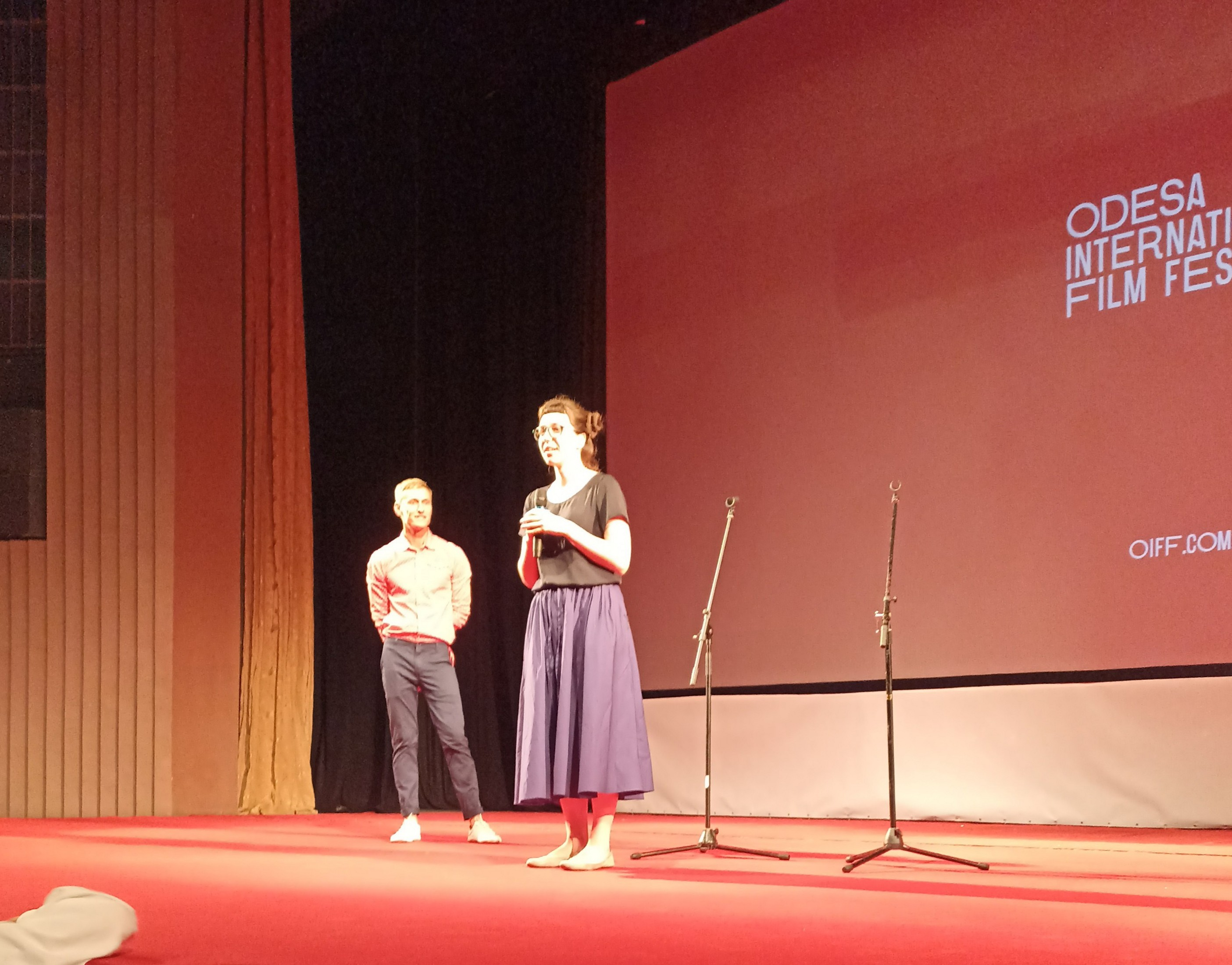
- Kateryna Gornostai presents her film Stop-Zemlia at the 12th Odesa International Film Festival
- Born: 15 March 1989 (age 37); Lutsk, USSR (Ukraine)
- Education: Marina Razbezhkina and Mikhail Ugarov's School of Documentary Film and Theatre; National University of Kyiv-Mohyla Academy
- Occupations: Filmmaker; screenwriter; film editor
- Years active: 2013–present
- Awards: Shevchenko National Prize

Kateryna Gornostai (Ukrainian: Горностай Катерина Павлівна; born March 15, 1989) is a Ukrainian film director, screenwriter and film editor. She is a jury member of the film festival Wiz-Art since 2014 and a member of the Ukrainian Film Academy since 2017.

== Biography ==
Kateryna Gornostai was born in Lutsk, Volyn Oblast on March 15, 1989. She was the only child of psychotherapists Svetlana Vaskivska and Pavel Gornostay.

== Education ==
First, Kateryna studied biology (2010) and later Journalism (2012, MD) at the National University of Kyiv-Mohyla Academy. Having graduated from the Marina Razbezhkina and Mikhail Ugarov's Documentary Film and Theatre in Moscow from October 2012 to November 2013, she returned home to Kyiv.

== Film career ==
Kateryna Gornostai started her career as a documentary filmmaker in 2012. She is currently working on educational documentaries as well as her own documentary and fiction film projects. Kateryna also teaches documentary filmmaking at Kyiv-Mohyla Academy's School of Journalism. She began to experiment with fiction films and hybrid forms. Her aesthetic and ability to convey life without artificiality have caught the attention of film critics.

== Filmography ==
Year	English name	Ukrainian name	Genre	Occupation
2011	True News	Справжні новини	Documentary	Director, co-authored with Dmitro Krasny
2013	Between Us	Між нами	Documentary, short film, course work	Director & cinematographer, co-author R. Bondarchuk, Y. Gontaruk, A. Kiselyov, A. Litvinenko, R. Lyubi, O. Solodunov, D. Stoykov, O. Techinsky, V. Tykhy
2014	Euromaidan, Rough Cut	Євромайдан. Чорновий монтаж	Documentary	Director & cinematographer
2015	Away	Віддалік	Fiction short film	Director & cinematographer
2015	Maidan is Everywhere	Скрізь Майдан	Middle-length documentary	Director & cinematographer
2016	Condensed milk	Згущьонка	Fiction short film	Director, co-authored with Dmitro Krasny
2017	Lilac	Бузок	Fiction short film	Director & screenwriter
2018	Crocodile	Крокодил	Fiction short film	Director & screenwriter
2021	Stop-Zemlia	Стоп-Земля	Fiction feature film	Director & screenwriter
2025	Timestamp	Strichka chasu	Documentary film	Director

== Awards ==
Year	Film	Nomination	Festival
2015	Away	Best Ukrainian Film at 2015	Wiz-Art Film Festival
		Best Acting at 2015	Odesa International Film Festival
		Best Ukrainian Short at 2015	Molodist International Film Festival
2015	Maidan is Everywhere	Andriy Matrosov Award at 2015	DocuDays UA
2017	Lilac	Special Jury Mention and the FIPRESCI Prize for Best Ukrainian Short Film at 2017	Odesa International Film Festival
2021	Stop-Zemlia	"Crystal Bear" for the best feature film from the Youth Jury of the Generation 14plus competition	Berlin International Film Festival
		Best Ukrainian Film at 2021; Best acting work and the Grand Prix	Odesa International Film Festival
		Best Feature Film, Opening of the Year, Best Director, Best Actress, and Best Screenplay	"Kinokolo"

== See also ==
- 55th Karlovy Vary International Film Festival
- List of LGBT-related films of 2021
