= Stop-Zemlia =

2021 Ukrainian film

- Film poster
- Directed by: Kateryna Gornostai
- Screenplay by: Kateryna Gornostai
- Produced by: Vitalii Sheremetiev; Vika Khomenko; Natalia Libet; Olga Beskhmelnytsina
- Starring: Maria Fedorchenko; Arsenii Markov; Yana Isaienko; Oleksandr Ivanov; Andrii Abalmazov
- Cinematography: Oleksandr Roshchyn
- Edited by: Kateryna Gornostai; Nikon Romanchenko
- Music by: Maryana Klochko
- Production company: ESSE Production House
- Distributed by: Altered Innocence(USA) Pluto Film (worldwide) Arthouse Traffic (Ukraine)
- Release dates: 1 March 2021 (Berlinale); 22 August 2021 (UK); 4 November 2021 (Ukraine)
- Running time: 122 minutes
- Country: Ukraine
- Language: Ukrainian
- Budget: approx. €829,000
- Box office: $143,434

Stop-Zemlia (Ukrainian: «Стоп-Земля», lit. 'Stop-Earth') is a 2021 Ukrainian romance, coming-of-age and drama film directed and written by Ukrainian director Kateryna Gornostai, and starring Maria Fedorchenko, Arsenii Markov, Yana Isaienko and Oleksandr Ivanov. The feature film portrays a teenage coming of age story. All the depicted events are fiction, but creative team attempted to portray them as improvisations. The characters had a set of activities when the script was written, but they gained traits once the actors were found. The film was first released on May 3, 2021, in Berlin International Film Festival, and received the Crystal Bear for the Best Film in the Generation 14plus competition.

The film received positive reviews from critics. Later the film appeared at the 12th Odesa International Film Festival (OIFF) on August 19, 2021, where the film received the main award of the festival - the Grand Prix. Kateryna Gornostai also became the winner of Duke in the nomination Best Full-Length Film. On March 9, 2022, the film was awarded the Taras Shevchenko National Prize of Ukraine.

The film's director, Kateryna Gornostai, opened the presentation by stating that the title 'Stop-Zemlia' is important to the film's success, and the film ended up keeping the same title in English, as so not to lose its intended impact. Kateryna spent about a year looking for real people to play the heroine and the class of students, and the chosen actors then underwent a 7-week acting workshop together before filming began.

== Plot ==
16-year-old Masha is studying in an ordinary high school in Kyiv. Her close friends Yana and Senia help her not to feel strange and detached in the class, living in their own way through busy school days. In addition to worry about future exams, Masha is forced to leave her comfort zone when falling in love with her classmate Sasha. She understands that if she does not dare to ask, she will never know whether her love for a guy is mutual.

While focusing on Masha, the film also switches to perspectives of Senia, Yana and Sasha throughout to offer a fuller picture of their lives and relationships.

== Cast ==
- Maria Fedorchenko as Masha Chernykh
- Arsenii Markov as Senia Steshenko
- Yana Isaienko as Yana Bratiychuk
- Oleksandr Ivanov as Sasha Hanskyi
- Andrii Abalmazov as Andrii Klymyshyn
- Rubin Abukhatab as Rubin Zhuravlov
- Marharyta Astakhova as Margo Osipova
- Oksana Babych as Oksana Herasymenko
- Inna Belikova as Masha's mother
- Sehiy Derevyanko as Masha's father
- Marta Dolesko as Marta Belska
- Kateryna Gornostai as herself
- Daniel Khoroshavin as Dania Andronov
- Kateryna Kozlova as Katia Shydlovska
- Viktoriia Kravchenko as the Biology teacher
- Nika Krykun as Nika Polonska
- Nastya Kulchytska as Nastia Shchukina
- Nina Makarchuk as Nina Alenych
- Yeva Nahorna as Yeva Hulak
- Olesya Ostrovska as Sasha's mother
- Ivan Perepechechenko as Vania Dychenko
- Solomia Savchak as Solia Velychko
- Lev Shurov as ‘Mouse’ Ostashchenko
- Artem Sliusarenko as Artem Dzhun
- Olena Tolmachova as Lena Lynnyk
- Polina Vorona as Polina Chorna
- Dymytrii Yaroshenko as Matvii Chernykh (Masha's brother)
- Anton Tejov as Anton Kapko
- Sofia Yevmina as Sonia Konovalenko
- Daryna Yurchyshyn as Darka Hnatyk
- Mykyta Zhernosiekov as Nikita Zhardetski

== Release ==
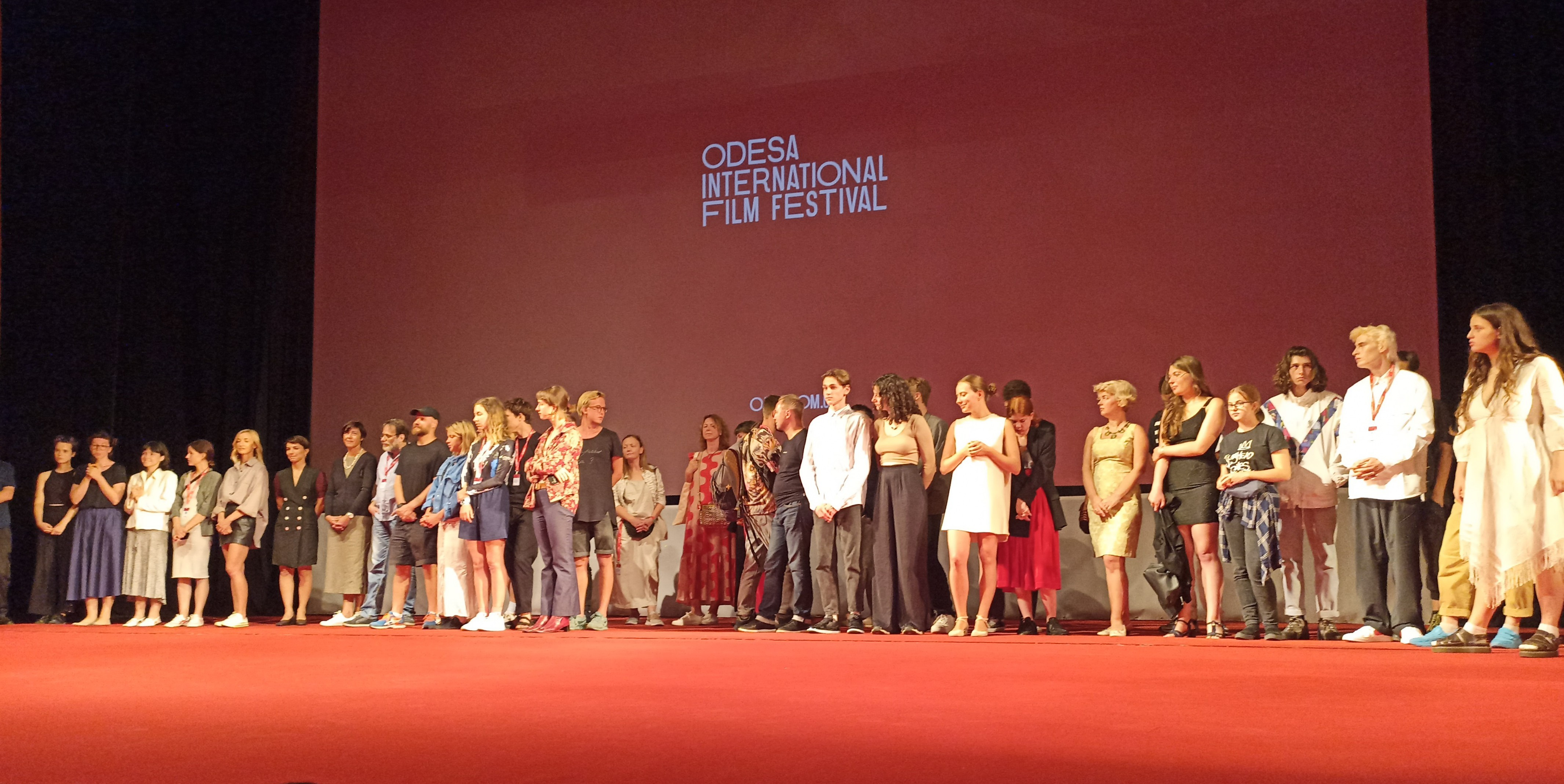
Stop-Zemlia (2021) production crew on the stage before the screening in the 12th Odesa International Film Festival, August 19, 2021.

The German company Pluto Film acquired the international distribution rights to Stop-Zemlia in February 2021. Altered Innocence purchased the film's American distribution rights in March 2021. The Ukrainian Arthouse Traffic had already bought the film's Ukrainian distribution rights prior to that.

On March 1, 2021, the film was released via online digital access during the 71st Berlin International Film Festival's (a.k.a. Berlinale) Generation 14plus competition. The film was physically presented at the Berlinale on June 9, 2021.

On November 4, 2021, the film was released in limited theaters in Ukraine.

On January 21, 2022, the film was released in select theaters in the US, and paid streaming on Amazon and YouTube.

At the beginning of March, 2022, Altered Innocence released a limited amount of copies of Stop-Zemlia on DVD.

== Box office ==
The film's budget was ₴25.72 million, approximately, €829,000. Currently, 92 percent of the tape's funding comes from the sponsorship of Ukrainian state film agency with the remainder of the budget being covered by partnerships. It grossed and took a worldwide total of $143,434.

== Reception ==
- "The film convincingly covers a variety of important topics which appeal to us as young people. Platonic love, queerness, solidarity and psychological stress reinforce the effect of the film as an authentic coming-of-age story. By virtue of creative visualisation techniques, it becomes clear in an artistic manner how our generation dreams, feels and experiences life. The message is conveyed that it is part of life to face certain fears in order to be able to enjoy the most exciting years of youth" - Statement of the Youth Jury, Berlinale.
- "Emotional and subjective realism takes precedence in this otherwise naturalistic and observational film" - Katie Walsh, Los Angeles Times.
- "Gornostai’s strengths are also evident in her recreations of adolescent egoism" - Elizabeth Weitzman, The Wrap.

Awards
Award	Festival
Crystal Bear	Berlin International Film Festival
Grand Prix	Odesa International Film Festival
Golden Duke	Odesa International Film Festival

== See also ==
- 55th Karlovy Vary International Film Festival
- List of LGBT-related films of 2021
- Timestamp
