= Police state (disambiguation) =

Police state is a government that exercises power arbitrarily.

Police State may also refer to:

- Police State (1989 film), an Australian TV film about the Fitzgerald Inquiry
- Police State (2017 film), an American sci-fi and adventure film
- Police State, a 2023 film by Dinesh D'Souza and Dan Bongino
- Police State (performance), a 2025 durational performance by Nadya Tolokonnikova

== See also ==
- List of fictional police states
- No to police state, All-Ukrainian civil campaign against police brutality
- Military rule (disambiguation)
