= Timeline of the 1991 Soviet coup attempt =

20 August 1991: position of the Supreme Soviets of the Republics and regions in relation to the GKChP (coup plotters). Support for the GKChP Resistance to the GKChP Neutrality or no reaction

This is a timeline of the 1991 Soviet coup attempt, starting from the house arresting of Mikhail Gorbachev and ending in the surrender of the failed coup leaders, both in Foros, Crimea. Apart from the coup plotters united in the State Committee on the State of Emergency (GKChP), and the Government of the Soviet Union (which largely supported the GKChP), the two main players were the governments of the Russian SFSR (where almost 150 million people lived, or 51% of the total Soviet population), and the Ukrainian SSR (home to over 50 million people, or almost 20% of all Soviet citizens). (Note: By August 1991, the three Baltic republics and the Georgian SSR had already declared their independence. The remaining Soviet population was concentrated in the five Central Asian republics, with smaller populations living in Belarus, Azerbaijan, Armenia, and Moldavia.)

== Prelude ==
Date and time	Place	Description
29 July	Soviet Union	The direct cause and primary motivation for the attempted coup was a confidential conversation of 29 July 1991 between Gorbachev, Boris Yeltsin and Nursultan Nazarbayev at Novo-Ogaryovo (Moscow), discussing how to implement the New Union Treaty that was to be signed on 20 August 1991. The three leaders came to an agreement to purge some high-ranking officials of the Soviet government and KGB on or after 20 August as well, including Prime Minister Valentin Pavlov (to be replaced by Nazarbayev), Vice-President Gennady Yanayev, KGB head Vladimir Kryuchkov, and Interior Minister Boris Pugo, while Gorbachev rejected Yeltsin's demand to remove Minister of Defence Dmitry Yazov. As the whole conversation was wiretapped by the KGB, its head Kryuchkov began plotting a coup with his would-be co-conspirators to prevent their own removal from power, preferably at a time when Gorbachev was away on holiday outside Moscow, just like how Leonid Brezhnev and his associates had overthrown Nikita Khrushchev in 1964.
6–14 August	Soviet Union	On 4 August, Gorbachev flew to his summer dacha in Foros, Crimea for a holiday that was to last until 18 August; he planned to return to Moscow on 19 August. On 6 August, Kryuchkov ordered his KGB experts to make an impact assessment of how the general public would react to declaring a state of emergency. The results were largely negative, and would further deteriorate the economic situation. However, a tapped Gorbachev–Yeltsin telephone conversation on 14 August confirmed their readiness to sign the New Union Treaty, showing no signs that their alliance was falling apart, as Kryuchkov had hoped; therefore, he decided to press ahead. Starting from 14 August, Kryuchkov began making detailed plans for the coup, ordering his KGB subordinates to prepare for a state of emergency and wiretapping the conversations of all democratic leaders.
16 August	Soviet Union	Kryuchkov held meetings with his co-conspirators all day at the KGB headquarters on how to proceed with the state of emergency.
17 August	Soviet Union	The Kryuchkov KGB group met a larger group of top party and Soviet government officials (who were not yet involved in the plot) at the "ABC" safehouse. Kryuchkov informed Prime Minister Pavlov and others that they were going to be removed from power after the New Union Treaty signing on 20 August. Pavlov said he was prepared to resign, but nevertheless joined the plotters. After the coup had failed, Pavlov and other participants in this meeting testified that removing Gorbachev from power was not discussed at the ABC safehouse; they simply planned to go to Crimea to convince Gorbachev to declare a state of emergency.

== Timeline ==
Date and time	Place	Description
18 August, 16:30	Ukrainian SSR	KGB officers arrived at Gorbachev's dacha in Foros, Crimea, ordered his telephone lines to be cut, and around 16:45 initiated an unscheduled meeting with him, headed by General Valentin Varennikov, isolating Gorbachev from allies outside. They initially denied Gorbachev was under arrest, and tried to persuade them to join their side; although Gorbachev was more concerned about the rise of Boris Yeltsin at the time, and so far trusted most people in the would-be State Committee on the State of Emergency (GKChP), he understood it was created extra-constitutionally. Gorbachev instead negotiated to convince the plotters to stay loyal to him, accusing them of treason if they did not. As no agreement could be reached and Gorbachev forcefully refused cooperation on the GKChP's terms, the plotters put him under house arrest and left, confused and angry that the President did not support them.
18 August, 22:00	Soviet Union	The KGB delegation from Crimea arrived in the Moscow Kremlin to report on their failure. The plotters disagreed about their next course of action for some time, eventually deciding that in order to prevent Gorbachev from retaliating, he had to be removed from power on "health grounds" by Vice-President Gennady Yanayev. Only a few hours earlier that day, Yanayev (who had been drinking with a friend at a resort near Moscow when he was unexpectedly called to Moscow) had been informed about the plot by Kryuchkov. When asked by Kryuchkov to sign a prepared copy of a one-sentence decree to become acting president of the Soviet Union due to Gorbachev's incapacity and declare a state of emergency, Yanayev protested: there was no evidence Gorbachev had any medical problem, that whatever business there was could be taken care of once the president had recovered, and finally that Yanayev did not feel ready to become acting president. However, the plotters pressured Yanayev into signing the decree, as getting the vice-president on board was their only hope of superficially legitimising the coup, even though their actions remained thoroughly unconstitutional. (Note: Although the paperwork prepared by Kryuchkov and his henchmen contained numerous references to the 1977 Constitution of the Soviet Union, the decrees issued by the GKChP were all unconstitutional: Gorbachev was not incapacitated, and a state of emergency could only be declared with the consent of the Supreme Soviet of the Soviet Union and the Supreme Soviets of all 15 Republics of the Soviet Union. The only reason the GKChP managed to cite for the emergency was "the need to save the harvest", although this seemed neither better nor worse than usual.)
19 August, 00:00	Soviet Union	Acting President Yanayev and Prime Minister Pavlov spent the rest of the night drinking until dawn in Yanayev's office.
19 August, 03:30	Soviet Union	KGB head and coup mastermind Kryuchkov spent the rest of the night organising the implementation of the coup, calling a general meeting of the KGB leadership at 03:30, where he announced the end of perestroika, the failure of the democratic leadership (Gorbachev and his advisors) to control the situation, and that it was time to impose a state of emergency.
19 August, 04:00	Soviet Union	News broadcasts later reported (retroactively) that the state of emergency entered into force "for a period of six months, beginning at 04:00 o'clock Moscow time on 19 August 1991."
19 August, 04:00	Ukrainian SSR	General Igor Maltsev ordered the Crimean Airport to close. Warships anchored near Kap Foros near the summer dacha of president Mikhail Gorbachev. (Note: The Gorbachev family spent a sleepless night, unsure what was going on; Raisa Gorbacheva noted in her diary: "The patrol ships came unually close to the shore, stayed for about fifty minutes and subsequently left.")
19 August, 04:20	Russian SFSR	60 commandos of the KGB "Alpha" group were sent to Boris Yeltsin's resort house (dacha) in Arkhangelskoye-2 near Moscow, with orders to arrest him. It is unclear whether they came close to it, but Kryuchkov changed his mind and called off the Alpha operation in Arkhangelskoye, because he feared the backlash it would cause, and he still counted on Yeltsin coming to the support of the GKChP against Gorbachev. The KGB allowed Yeltsin to travel to Moscow unhindered.
19 August, 05:00	Soviet Union	Kryuchkov spread a list of 70 opposition leaders to be detained to military commanders.
19 August, 05:57	Soviet Union	Official radio statement by the GKChP proclaiming the state of emergency, and mentioning the members of the GKChP A State of Emergency was declared in the entire territory of the Soviet Union. All power was claimed by the State Committee on the State of Emergency (GKChP), a "Gang of 8" whose members were Acting President Gennady Yanayev, Prime Minister Valentin Pavlov, Interior Minister Boris Pugo, Defence Minister Dmitry Yazov, Chairman of the KGB Vladimir Kryuchkov, First Deputy Chairman of the Defense Council of the USSR Oleg Baklanov, Chairman of the Peasants' Union of the USSR Vasily Starodubtsev, and President of the Association of State Enterprises Alexander Tizyakov. (Note: The Gorbachev family also received this news, because they had hidden a tiny Sony radio in the Crimean dacha.)
19 August, c. 06:00~18:00	Soviet Union	The most famous part of Swan Lake, associated with the coup. Recordings of Tchaikovsky's ballet Swan Lake were broadcast in continuous loops for about 12 hours on television throughout the Soviet Union. Throughout the country, people were confused and afraid, because there was a lack of information about what was going on, and a fear that mass arrests were about to take place.
19 August, 06:30	Ukrainian SSR	General Valentin Varennikov, one of the putchists, met CPU Secretary Stanislav Hurenko in Kyiv, demanding he declare a state of emergency in the Ukrainian SSR. Hurenko called Verkhovna Rada president Leonid Kravchuk to meet them at the Central Committee, but Kravchuk refused, telling Varennikov to meet him in the Verkhovna Rada building instead.
19 August, 07:30	Ukrainian SSR	Pressed by Varennikov, Kostyantyn Masyk chaired an emergency meeting of the government of Ukraine (with 36 to 38 people including KGB officer Yevhen Marchuk), starting around 07:30 or 07:40. The meeting concluded that each minister had to formulate proposals for action plans specific to their sector to preserve the functioning of the republic's systems during the state of emergency.
19 August, 08:00	Ukrainian SSR; Russian SFSR	Boris Yeltsin tried to call Mikhail Gorbachev in Crimea from Moscow, but could not get through. Yeltsin called Leonid Kravchuk in Kyiv, because "Crimea is yours". (Note: Russian: Крым ваш, romanized: Krym vash, lit. 'Crimea is yours'. See also Krymnash.) However, Kravchuk could not reach Gorbachev by telephone either, as he was supposedly "ill". Kravchuk called Yeltsin back; they conclude something was very wrong, and that they needed to act carefully.
19 August c.8:30	Ukrainian SSR	Varennikov brought many generals (including Kyiv Military District commander Viktor Chechevatov) with him to the Rada, seeking to compel Kravchuk, Hurenko and Kostyantyn Masyk to declare a state of emergency and grant permission to send troops into Ukraine (with the pretext to quell supposed 'nationalist unrest' in Lviv), but Kravchuk played for time by red-taping Varennikov with parliamentary procedures until Varennikov gave up and left.
19 August, 09:00	Russian SFSR	Tanks were driven near the Russian Soviet Federative Socialist Republic's parliament building, the White House. At the time, Boris Yeltsin was still in Arkhangelskoye-2, but he decided to travel to Moscow.
19 August c.9:30	Soviet Union	Coup mastermind Kryuchkov tried to call his co-conspirators Yanayev and Pavlov, but nobody answered the phone. He started calling everyone he could.
19 August, 10:00	Soviet Union	First GKChP meeting in Yanayev's office. Kryuchkov informed the rest that Yeltsin told him on the phone that he refused to cooperate with the coup. This was a setback, but no major concern, said Kryuchkov, as the coup was otherwise going according to plan.
19 August, 10:40	Soviet Union	The GKChP suspended the freedom of the press; all media were told to cease publications, except for spreading statements issued by the GKChP itself.
19 August, 10:45	Russian SFSR	Russian Soviet Federative Socialist Republic President Boris Yeltsin condemned the coup and called for a general strike, but it went unanswered.
19 August, 12:00	Russian SFSR	Tanks were driven near the Kremlin and Red Square. People gathered near the Parliament Building of the Russian SFSR to support Yeltsin, and built barricades around the Parliament Building.
19 August, 12:50	Russian SFSR	Boris Yeltsin delivered his famous tank speech, calling the GKChP unconstitutional, its actions illegal, and its decrees null and void. However, relatively few people heard it, and although foreign journalists present spread this news around the world within the next hour, it was not broadcoast on Soviet television until evening.
19 August, 12:50	Ukrainian SSR	Three GKChP-aligned military helicopters began circling above the Verkhovna Rada of Ukraine in Kyiv, threatening to arrest the democratically-elected people's deputies.
19 August, 13:00	Georgian SSR	Georgia's president Zviad Gamsakhurdia encouraged people to be calm in Tbilisi.
19 August, 14:00	International	U.S. President George H. W. Bush condemned the coup.
19 August, 16:10	Russian SFSR	Boris Yeltsin declared himself the legal Head of State of Russia. The GKChP declared an emergency in Moscow and Leningrad. Miners strike started in Russia.
19 August, 16:35	Lithuanian SSR	Lithuania's leader Vytautas Landsbergis encouraged people to start passive resistance.
19 August, 18:00	Soviet Union	Ending the Swan Lake loops on Soviet television, the GKChP held its first press conference in the Foreign Ministry Building at 18:00. Gennadi Yanayev announced that President Gorbachev was ill, and staying in Crimea. After loyal Soviet reporters asked prepared questions that helped Yanayev make the case why extraordinary measures were needed, 24-year-old local journalist Tatiana Malkina of the GKChP-banned Independent Newspaper (who secretly managed to sneak in) unexpectedly asked: "Do you understand that last night you carried out a coup d'état? And which comparison is best, to 1917 or to 1964?" Thereafter, the press conference became a debacle, with the GKChP barely able to convince the gathered foreign and independent journalists of what they were seeking to achieve, why, and on what legal grounds. Moreover, the general impression that the public got from the GKChP was a bunch of old, grey, half-bald men who were hardly competent to run the country, much less in an emergency situation for which the reasons were unclear. (Note: Ukrainian author Oksana Zabuzhko recalled the press conference as akin to 'horror films': "Everything was so incredibly grey, horribly soviet, you know, as if some bogeys creeped out from the swamp, the shadows of the past." Leonid Kravchuk recalled: "It was clear that all those people at the table were unable to do anything; they contradicted each other, sat with their heads low. They were totally helpless. Yanayev himself showed an absolute incapability to generalise the situation. He did not look like a person who took charge of the really hard mission. I believe even he was not sure that they were doing the right thing.") It was widely noticed that Yanayev's voice was trembling and his hands were restless.
19 August, 19:00	Ukrainian SSR	Leonid Kravchuk held a televised speech, saying "no state of emergency has been declared in Ukraine, the situation is generally stable," everyone should remain calm, and society would continue to run based on the laws of Ukraine and the Declaration of State Sovereignty of Ukraine (1990). He heavily implied that the creation and actions of the State Committee on the State of Emergency (GKChP) were illegal and unconstitutional ("But there is no doubt that in a Rechtsstaat, everything should be done on the basis of the law, including a declaration of a state of emergency", and "It is our unity that will become a guarantee against any attempts, from any side, to act in defiance of the Constitution"), but stopped short of saying so explicitly, instead emphasising that they had no legal force in Ukraine.
19 August, 20:00	Russian SFSR	The GKChP warned Boris Yeltsin not to provoke the masses.
19 August, 21:00	Russian SFSR	Tamanskaya elite force tanks proceeded to support Yeltsin.
20 August, 00:30	International	U.S. President George H. W. Bush called the coup leaders in an effort to restore Gorbachev to power.
20 August, 01:00	Russian SFSR	Tens of thousands of people demonstrated against the GKChP near the White House parliament building.
20 August, 04:00	Russian SFSR	Mayor of Leningrad, Anatoly Sobchak, condemned the coup.
20 August, 08:00	Estonian SSR; Latvian SSR; Lithuanian SSR	Soviet Army's Baltic commander Fedor Kuzmin declared control over Estonia, Latvia and Lithuania.
20 August, 12:00	Russian SFSR	Over 100,000 people demonstrated against the coup in Leningrad.
20 August, 14:00	Moldavian SSR	Moldavia's premier Valeriu Muravschi declared his support for Yeltsin.
20 August, 15:00	International	European Community halted all economic aid en route to the Soviet Union.
20 August, 16:00	International	U.S. President George H. W. Bush gave his support to Boris Yeltsin by telephone, supporting the return of Gorbachev to power.
20 August, 19:50	Ukrainian SSR; Kazakh SSR	Ukraine's Verkhovna Rada rejected the GKChP's declaration of the state of emergency, saying it had no legal force in Ukraine, and that the Rada would not declare one in Ukraine either. Kazakhstan's president Nursultan Nazarbayev condemned the coup and resigned from the Politburo and Central Committee.
20 August, 20:00	Russian SFSR	Yeltsin took control of all Russian troops under his command. A curfew was declared at night time.
20 August, 20:35	Soviet Union	GKChP member Prime Minister Valentin Pavlov announced that he was ill.
20 August, 21:00	Soviet Union	GKChP member Defence Minister Dmitry Yazov resigned because of health reasons.
20 August, 23:00	Russian SFSR	In Moscow tens of thousands of people condemn the coup.
20 August, 23:10	Estonian SSR	Estonian Supreme Soviet declared restoration of its pre-1940 independence from the Soviet Union.
20 August, 23:59	Russian SFSR	Demonstrators burnt two tanks in front of the Parliament Building.
21 August, 00:01	Russian SFSR	Tanks were not able to break the barricades in the front of the White House parliament building.
21 August, 00:40	Russian SFSR	Three civilians were shot in a skirmish in Moscow.
21 August, 01:31	Russian SFSR	The army failed to break the barricades in front of the Russian Parliament Building.
21 August, 02:21	Russian SFSR	Civilians formed a human chain in front of the Russian Parliament Building. Arrest warrant issued for Yeltsin.
21 August, 08:39	Russian SFSR	Russian Parliament Building still free. Some tanks defected to Yeltsin's side.
21 August, 09:20	Latvian SSR	General strike started in Latvia.
21 August, 11:50	Ukrainian SSR	Mikhail Gorbachev refused to return to Moscow as offer behest of the coup leaders. Yeltsin also refused to travel to Crimea to get Gorbachev back to Moscow.
21 August, 13:00	Uzbek SSR	Uzbekistan's president Islam Karimov declareds the GKChP's actions illegal and threatened to leave the Communist Party.
21 August, 13:15	Russian SFSR	The coup leaders fled Moscow.
21 August, 13:29	Russian SFSR	Soviet Russian Parliament gave a mandate to Yeltsin to arrest the coup leaders.
21 August, 13:39	Soviet Union	Military cadre agreed to pull all troops from Moscow.
21 August, 14:59	Ukrainian SSR	Coup leaders escaped to Crimea.
21 August, 15:20	Soviet Union	Ministry of Defence announced that all troops were pulled out, back to their bases.
21 August, 16:13	Byelorussian SSR	Some coup leaders are arrested in Sverdlovsk, Byelorussia.
21 August, 16:15	Soviet Union	Supreme Soviet's Defence Committee declared the emergency over.
21 August, 16:29	Ukrainian SSR	GKChP members Kryuchkov (KGB) and Defense Minister Yazov travelled to Crimea to meet Gorbachev.
21 August, 17:00	Lithuanian SSR	Soviet troops pulled out from Lithuania. Press censorship was lifted.
21 August, 17:10	Soviet Union	The Supreme Soviet of the USSR declared the GKChP's instructions null and void, and restored Gorbachev to power.
21 August, 18:14	Soviet Union	Supreme Soviet announced that Gorbachev was President of the Soviet Union again.
21 August, 18:30	Ukrainian SSR	Gorbachev left Crimea.
21 August, 18:59	Soviet Union	GKChP member Vice-President Gennadi Yanayev returned to the Kremlin.
21 August, 19:19	International	U.S. President George H. W. Bush talked with Gorbachev by telephone.
21 August, 20:13	Soviet Union	Gorbachev was announced to lead the Soviet Union again.
21 August, 20:17	Ukrainian SSR	Four coup leaders were located and arrested at Gorbachev's dacha in Crimea.

== Bibliography ==
- Collapse: How Ukrainians Destroyed the Evil Empire (2021), documentary miniseries detailing the events in Kyiv and Moscow from 19 to 24 August 1991
  - "The Day of Fear" (documentary). Collapse: How Ukrainians Destroyed the Evil Empire. Episode 1 (in Ukrainian and English). Suspilne. 23 August 2021. (events of 19 August 1991)
  - "The Night of Anger" (documentary). Collapse: How Ukrainians Destroyed the Evil Empire. Episode 2 (in Ukrainian and English). Suspilne. 23 August 2021. (events of 20 August 1991)
  - "No Euphoria" (documentary). Collapse: How Ukrainians Destroyed the Evil Empire. Episode 3 (in Ukrainian and English). Suspilne. 23 August 2021. (events of 21 August 1991)
- Plokhy, Serhii (2015). The Last Empire: The Final Days of the Soviet Union. New York: Oneworld Publications. ISBN 978-1-78074-417-9.
- Sokol, Alexander (17 August 2001). "19 августа 1991 года на военный аэродром в борисполе высадилась полоцкая десантная дивизия, «прославившаяся» подавлением антисоветских мятежей в вильнюсе и баку" [On 19 August 1991, the Polotsk Airborne Division—which had ‘gained notoriety’ for suppressing anti-Soviet uprisings in Vilnius and Baku—landed at the military airfield in Boryspil]. Fakty.ua (in Russian). 2001 interview with Kostyantyn Masyk, then-acting head of the Ukrainian government as first deputy chairman of the Council of Ministers of the Ukrainian SSR in August 1991.
