= Constitution of Baden-Württemberg =

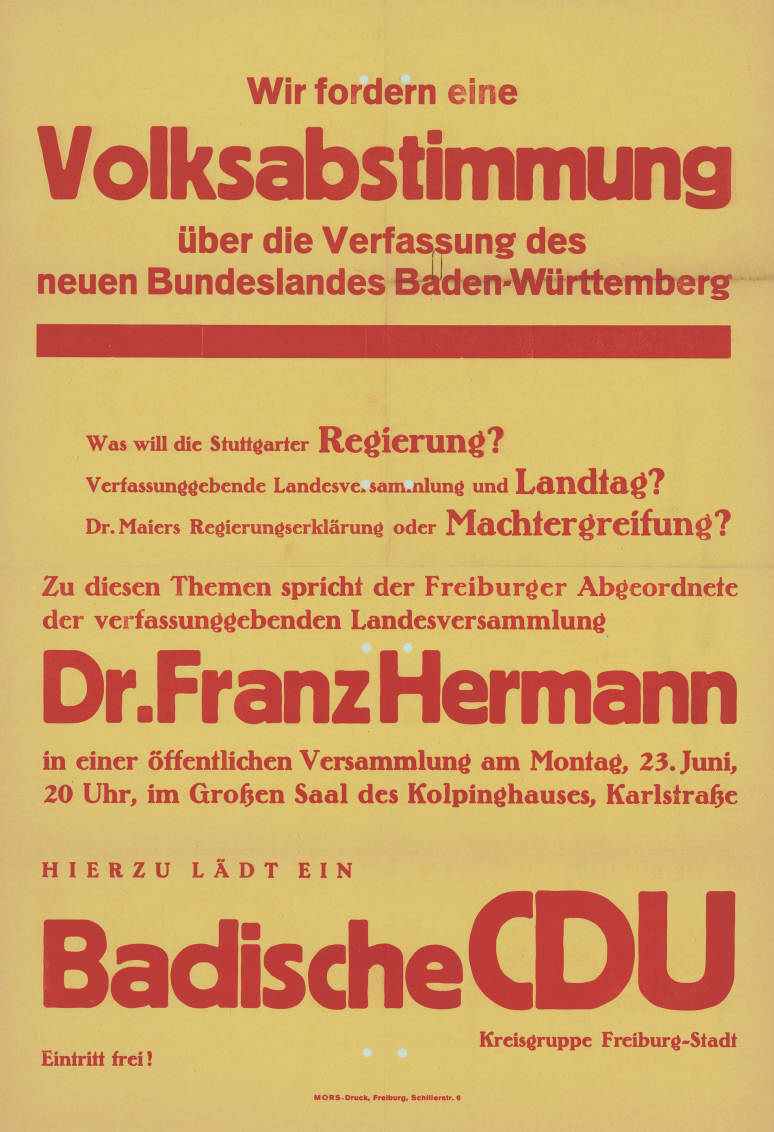
CDU poster calling for a referendum on the constitution

The Constitution of the State of Baden-Württemberg was passed by the state constitutional assembly on 11 November 1953 after the founding of the state of Baden-Württemberg on 25 April 1952 and came into force on 19 November 1953 with a solemn state ceremony in the main house (opera house) of the Württemberg State Theatre. Unlike other German state constitutions, it was not confirmed by a referendum. It replaced the constitutions of the states of Baden, Württemberg-Baden and Württemberg-Hohenzollern. For a transitional period from 15 May 1952, the law on the provisional exercise of state power in the southwest German state, which had been passed by the state constitutional assembly, applied.

The Constitution of Baden-Württemberg has been amended twenty-five times since then, most recently by law of 26 April 2022.

== Structure and content ==
The constitution consists of the preamble and two main parts, which in turn are divided into a total of 11 sections.

=== First main part: Of man and his orders ===
I. Man and State (Articles 1–3c)
II. Religion and religious communities (Articles 4–10)
III. Education and instruction (Articles 11–22)

The constitution does not contain its own catalogue of fundamental rights, but declares in Article 2 paragraph 1 that the fundamental rights and civil rights laid down in the Basic Law for the Federal Republic of Germany are an integral part of the constitution.

- the “inalienable human right to a homeland” (Article 2, paragraph 2);
- the right of every young person “irrespective of origin or economic situation [...] to an education and training appropriate to his or her abilities” (Article 11 paragraph 1);
- the right of every young person “irrespective of origin or economic situation [...] to an education and training appropriate to his or her abilities” (Article 11 paragraph 1).

=== Second main part: On the state and its systems ===
I. The foundations of the state (Articles 23–26)
II. The state parliament (Articles 27–44)
III. The government (Articles 45–57)
IV. The legislation (Articles 58–64)
V. The administration of justice (Articles 65–68)
VI. The administration (Articles 69–78)
VII. The financial system (Articles 79–84)
Final provisions (Articles 85–94)

Like the Basic Law, the Constitution contains an eternity guarantee that extends to the principles of the republican, democratic and social constitutional state (Article 64). This also corresponds to the homogeneity requirement enshrined in the Basic Law (Article 28 Paragraph 1 of the Basic Law).

==== Political system ====
The structure of the country's political institutions as laid down in this main part corresponds to a parliamentary system of government.

- The Landtag, the unicameral parliament, is normally elected by the people for a term of five years (voting age is linked to adulthood).
- The Minister-President, head of government and head of state, is elected by the state parliament. The other members of the state government are appointed and dismissed by him and confirmed by the state parliament. The government is dependent on the trust of the state parliament, which can overthrow it (or the prime minister) at any time through a constructive vote of no confidence.
- The Constitutional Court decides on constitutional disputes. Its members are elected by the state parliament by a simple majority for a term of nine years; they can be re-elected. Otherwise, the courts' organization is regulated by federal law and is uniform throughout Germany.
- The State Audit Office is an independent state body responsible for auditing finances.
- Elements of direct democracy are provided for in the form of referendums and popular votes both in the legislative process (including for laws amending the constitution) and with the aim of dissolving the state parliament. However, these are largely insignificant in constitutional reality, so that to date there has only been one referendum on the initiative of the state parliament (see referendum on Stuttgart 21).

== Literature ==
- Klaus Braun, Klaas Engelken: Kommentar zur Verfassung des Landes Baden-Württemberg. 2 Bände, Richard Boorberg Verlag, Stuttgart u. a. 1984–1997, ISBN 3-415-01044-9 (Hauptbd.), ISBN 3-415-02253-6 (Ergbd.).
- Paul Feuchte: Verfassungsgeschichte von Baden-Württemberg. Verlag W. Kohlhammer, Stuttgart 1983, ISBN 3-17-008110-1, (Veröffentlichungen zur Verfassungsgeschichte von Baden-Württemberg seit 1945 1).
- Paul Feuchte (Hrsg.): Verfassung des Landes Baden-Württemberg. Kommentar. Verlag W. Kohlhammer, Stuttgart u. a. 1987, ISBN 3-17-007989-1.
- Volker M. Haug (Hrsg.): Verfassung des Landes Baden-Württemberg. Handkommentar. Nomos, Baden-Baden 2018, ISBN 978-3-8487-0500-9.
- Gerald G. Sander (Hrsg.): Verfassung des Landes Baden-Württemberg. Kommentar. Kommunal- und Schulverlag, Wiesbaden 2023, ISBN 978-3-8293-1651-4
