= List of fictional police states =

Fictional police states have featured in a number of media ranging from novels to films to video games.

== List of works featuring a police state ==
- Nineteen Eighty-Four by George Orwell. Orwell's novel describes Britain under the totalitarian Oceanian regime that continuously invokes (and helps to create) a perpetual war. This perpetual war is used as a pretext for subjecting the people to mass surveillance and invasive police searches. The novel has been described as "the definitive fictional treatment of a police state, which has also influenced contemporary usage of the term."
- The Star Wars franchise by George Lucas. The Galactic Empire dominates the galaxy the series is set in and rule it with the help of brutal enforcement carried out by the foot soldiers known as stormtroopers. The Galactic Empire is later reformed under the name of the First Order, who continue the totalitarian and authoritarian practices of their predecessor. The Andor television series depicts the Internal Security Bureau (ISB) as a secret police bureaucracy working to suppress dissent using authoritarian tactics.
- The Star Trek franchise by Gene Roddenberry. The Cardassian Union is a military dictatorship ruled over by the Central Command and a separate agency known as the Obsidian Order, which serves as both the secret police and intelligence agency of the Union. The Obsidian Order strictly polices the citizens of the Union, even going so far as to record the measurement of each indigent of what each citizen eats. Any person arrested for a crime on Cardassia is treated to a show trial with a pre-determined guilty verdict that usually results in life imprisonment or a death sentence.
- Warhammer 40,000 by Games Workshop. The Imperium of Man is a galactic empire run by a small group of oligarchic elites known as the High Lords of Terra. The Imperium imposes strict sets of rules on almost all of their citizens. The Inquisition not only keeps a watchful eye on everyday citizens but would destroy whole planets should there be dissenters or Chaos collaborators.
- The Hunger Games by Suzanne Collins. The elite of the Capitol dominate, exploit and repress the rest of what is left of an impoverished United States.
- THX 1138 directed by George Lucas. This 1971 film echoed contemporary images of police beating up anti-Vietnam War protestors.
- We by Yevgeny Zamyatin. The novel is about the "One State" where people live in glass homes and have no privacy.
- "A Sound of Thunder" by Ray Bradbury. A fascist state is inadvertently created by time travelers as a result of the butterfly effect.
- The television series Babylon 5 features two police states. One is the Earth Alliance government under President Morgan Clark, who ascended from being Vice President after assassinating President Luis Santiago and other moderates; the Alliance uses hardline military units, Psi Corp, Nightwatch, and other factions to crush all dissent, leading to civil war with the anti-fascist military units, government officials, and civilians. The other is the Centauri Republic under the rule of the insane Emperor Cartagia and the more extreme lords in the nobility led by Lord Refa. Cartagia rose to power with the death of his uncle Emperor Turhan and Prime Minister Malachi, and his regime assassinated, punished, slaughtered anyone that became obstacles to power.
- "The Honor Harrington Series" by David Weber. Between the books A Short, Victorious War, and Ashes of Victory, the Republic of Haven is ruled by a 'Committee of Public Safety' which, having come to power by a violent coup, maintains that power by dictatorial methods, carried out by the Office for State Security (StateSec). Towards the end, StateSec assumes complete control over the Republic, only to be overthrown by a military coup whose leaders then restore a democratic system.
- At the end of episode 8 in season 3 of Riverdale, the town of Riverdale becomes somewhat of a police state after the town is put under quarantine with the police, under the orders of mobster Hiram Lodge, exercising control and dominance over the town's inhabitants.
- The song "Everything Is Under Control" by Coldcut has lyrics that mention a police state: "Television incision on our frontal lobe, Capitalism: our mind control. You know Big Brother ain't a TV show! It's how we roll with what they know."
- The state of Gilead in the universe of The Handmaid's Tale novel and TV series exercises extreme control over all its citizens, especially with regard to the reproductive autonomy of fertile women.
