= Police state =

State that exercises extreme control over civil society and liberties

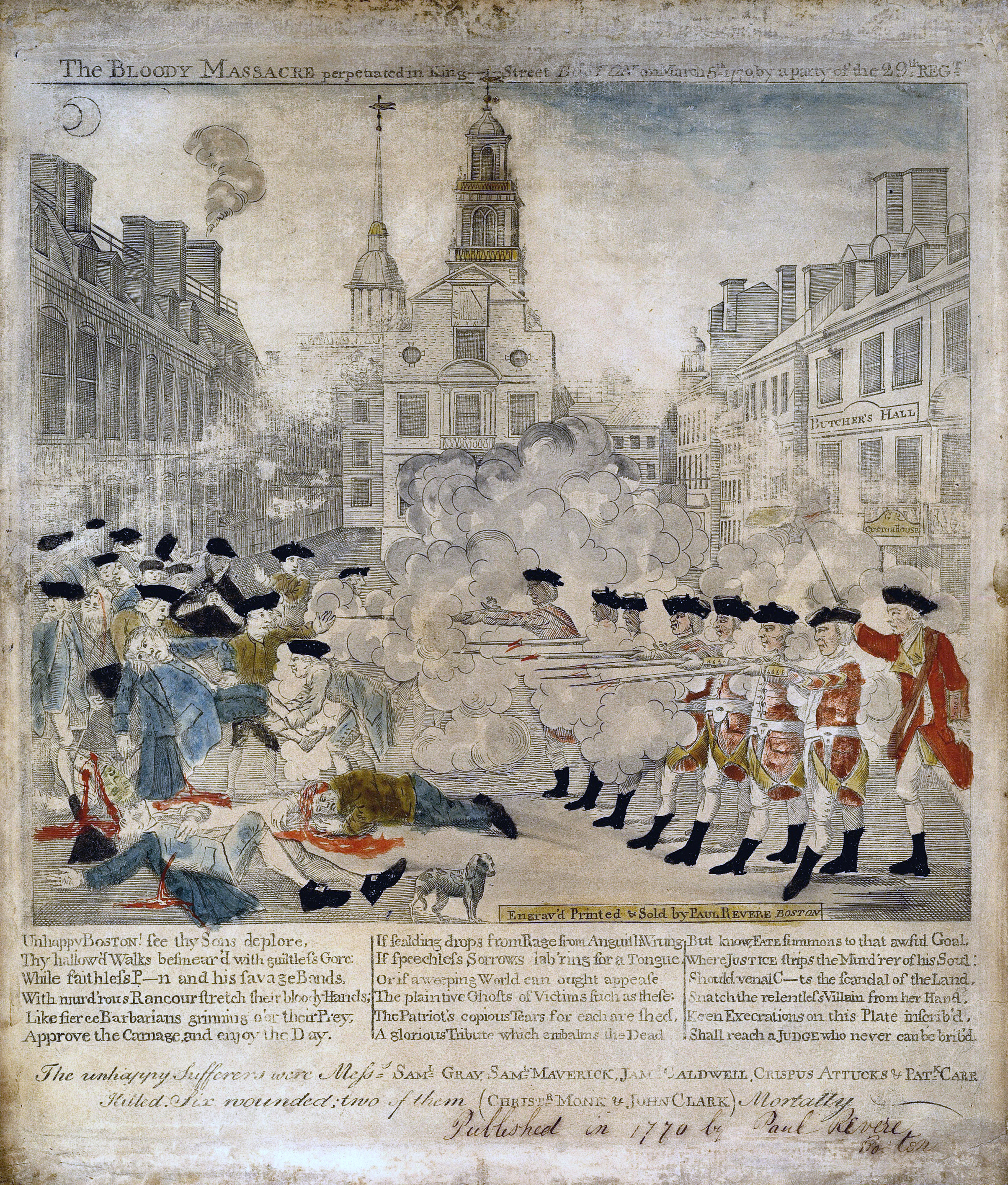
The British occupation of Boston following colonial protests of the Townshend Acts led to direct British military control of the city in October 1768, culminating in the Boston Massacre on 5 March, 1770

A police state is a state whose government institutions exercise an extreme level of control over civil society and liberties. There is typically little to no distinction between the law and the exercise of political power by the executive, and the deployment of internal security and police forces play a heightened role in governance. A police state is a characteristic of authoritarian, totalitarian or illiberal regimes (contrary to a liberal democratic regime). Such governments are not exclusive to simply one-party states or dominant-party states, as they can also arise in a democracy or multi-party system.

Originally, a police state was a state regulated by a civil administration, but since the beginning of the 20th century it has "taken on an emotional and derogatory meaning" by describing an undesirable state of living characterized by the overbearing presence of civil authorities. The inhabitants of a police state may experience restrictions on their mobility, or on their freedom to express or communicate political or other views, which are subject to police monitoring or enforcement. Political control may be exerted by means of a secret police force that operates outside the boundaries normally imposed by a constitutional state. Robert von Mohl, who first introduced the rule of law to German jurisprudence, contrasted the Rechtsstaat ("legal" or "constitutional" state) with the anti-aristocratic Polizeistaat ("police state").

== History of usage ==
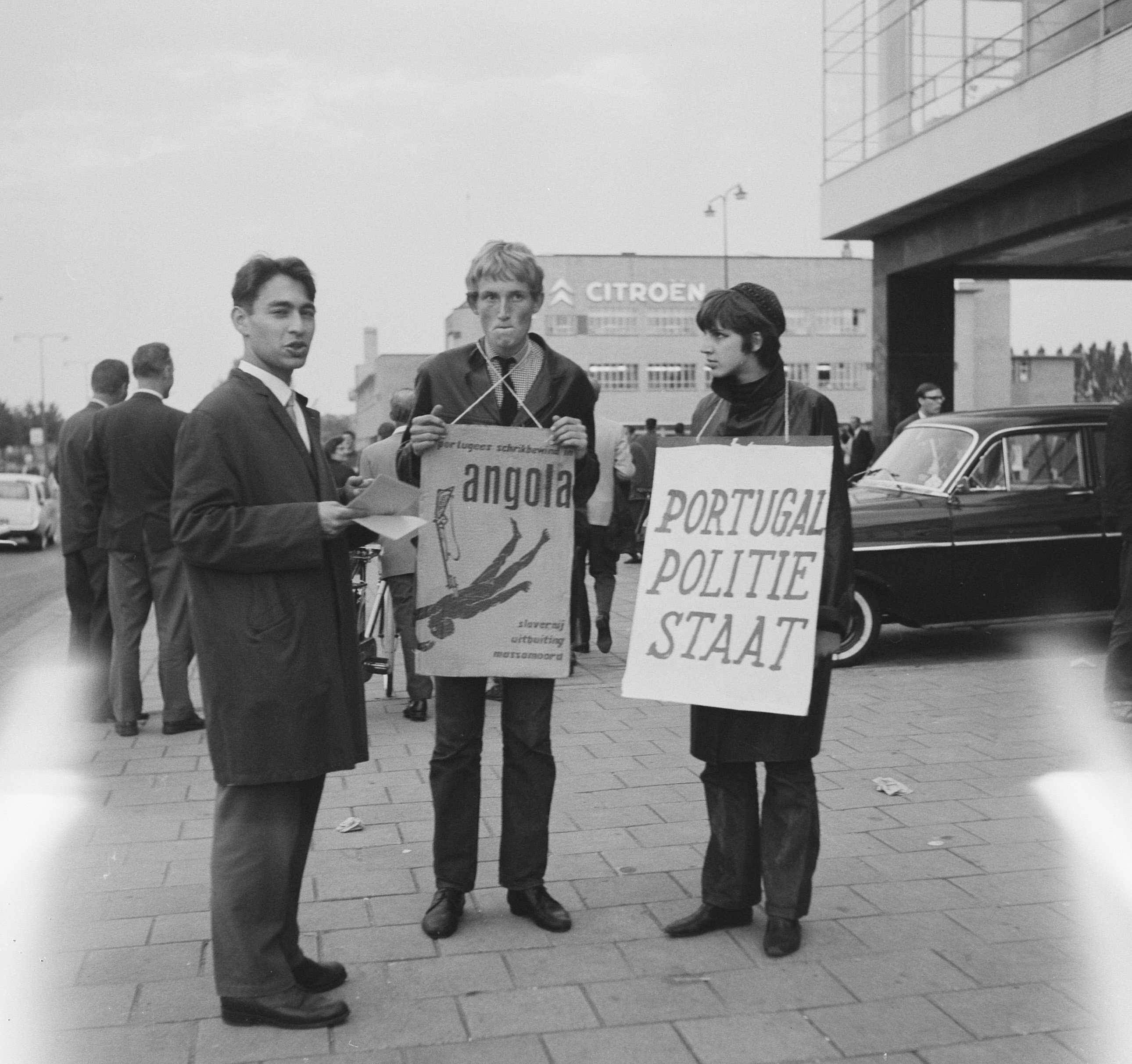
Demonstration in Amsterdam in 1963 against the police state (politiestaat) in Portuguese Angola during the Angolan War of Independence

The Oxford English Dictionary traces the phrase "police state" back to 1851, when it was used in reference to the use of a national police force to maintain order in the Austrian Empire. The German term Polizeistaat came into English usage in the 1930s with reference to totalitarian governments that had begun to emerge in Europe.

Because there are different political perspectives as to what an appropriate balance is between individual freedom and national security, there are no objective standards defining a police state. This concept can be viewed as a balance or scale. Along this spectrum, any law that has the effect of removing liberty is seen as moving towards a police state while any law that limits government oversight of the populace is seen as moving towards a free state.

An electronic police state is one in which the government aggressively uses electronic technologies to record, organize, search and distribute forensic evidence against its citizens.

== Examples of states with related attributes ==
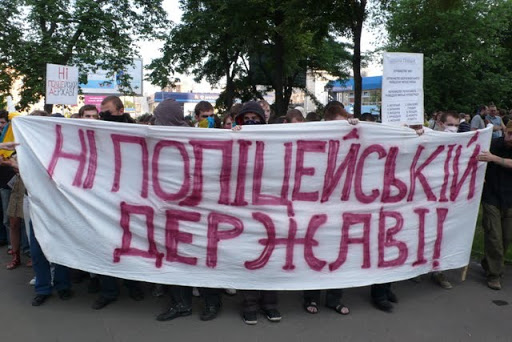
"No to police state" banner in Ukraine

Early forms of police states can be found in ancient China. The rule of King Li of Zhou in the 9th century BCE featured strict censorship, extensive state surveillance, and frequent executions of those who were perceived to be speaking against the regime. During this reign of terror, ordinary people did not dare to speak to each other on the street, and only made eye contacts with friends as a greeting, hence known as 道路以目, Dàolù yǐ mù, 'The roads have eyes'. During the 4th century BCE, the state of Qin introduced a registration system for its population, which initially collated the names of individuals, and later began keeping track of entire households. Adapting a concept originally used within the military to society at-large, Qin households were organised into 'groups of five' (五; wǔ), wherein the heads of each household were made mutually responsible for reporting any wrongdoing committed by other members of the group.

Some have characterised the rule of King Henry VIII during the Tudor period as a police state. The Oprichnina established by Tsar Ivan IV within the Russian Tsardom in 1565 functioned as a predecessor to the modern police state, featuring persecutions and autocratic rule.

Nazi Germany emerged from an originally democratic government, yet gradually exerted more and more repressive controls over its people in the lead-up to World War II. In addition to the SS and the Gestapo, the Nazi police state used the judiciary to assert control over the population from the 1930s until the end of the war in 1945.

During the period of apartheid, South Africa maintained police-state attributes such as banning people and organizations, arresting political prisoners, maintaining segregated living communities and restricting movement and access.

Augusto Pinochet's Chile operated as a police state, exhibiting "repression of public liberties, the elimination of political exchange, limiting freedom of speech, abolishing the right to strike, freezing wages".

The Republic of Cuba under President (and later right-wing dictator) Fulgencio Batista was an authoritarian police state until his overthrow during the Cuban Revolution in 1959 with the rise to power of Fidel Castro and foundation of a Marxist-Leninist republic.

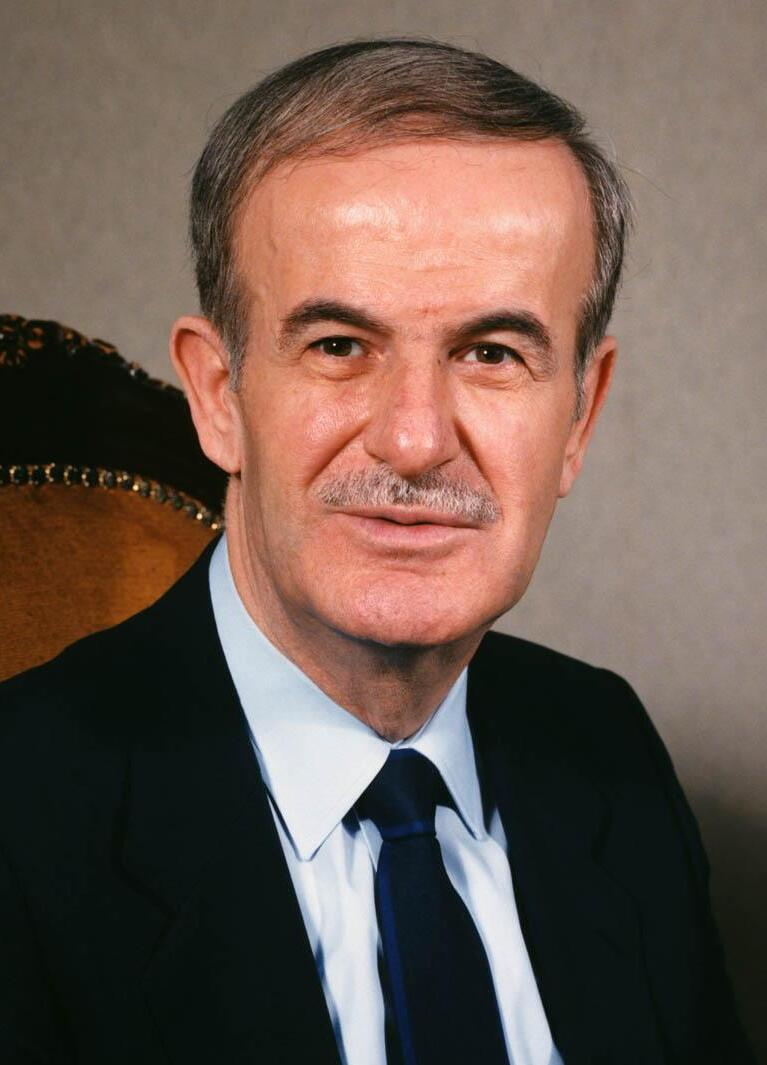
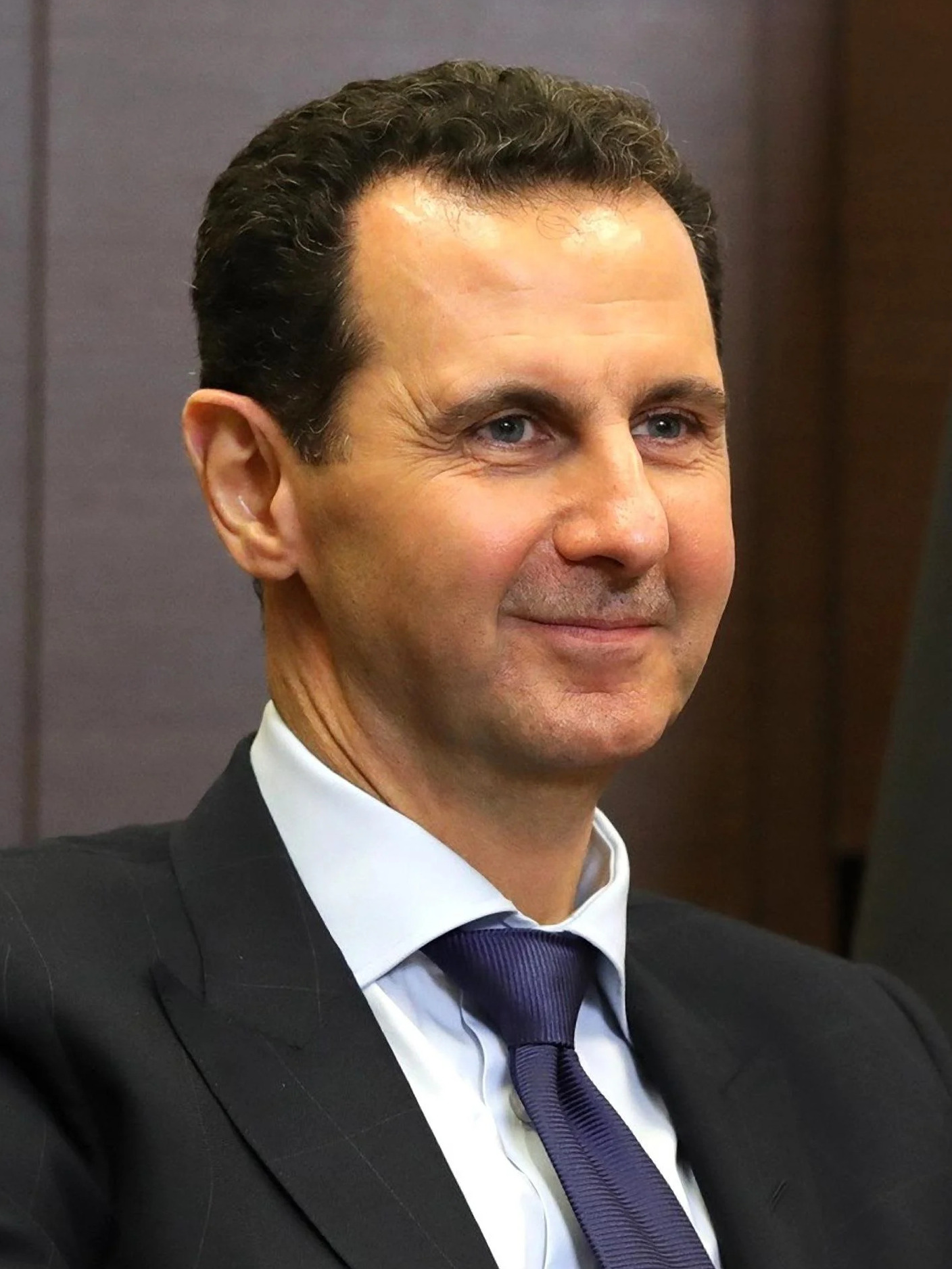
Ba'athist Syria under Hafez al-Assad (r. 1971–2000) and his son Bashar al-Assad (r. 2000 – 2024) has been described as the most ruthless police state in the Arab World.

Following the failed July 1958 Haitian coup d'état attempt to overthrow the president, Haiti descended into an autocratic and despotic family dictatorship under the Haitian Vodou black nationalist François Duvalier (Papa Doc) and his National Unity Party. In 1959, Papa Doc ordered the creation of Tonton Macoutes, a paramilitary force unit whom he authorized to commit systematic violence and human rights abuses to suppress political opposition, including an unknown number of murders, public executions, rapes, disappearances of and attacks on dissidents— an unrestrained state terrorism. In the 1964 Haitian constitutional referendum, he declared himself the president for life through a sham election. After Duvalier's death in 1971, his son Jean-Claude (Baby Doc) succeeded him as the next president for life, continuing the regime until the popular uprising that had him overthrown in February 1986.

Ba'athist Syria under the dictatorship of Bashar al-Assad was described as the most "ruthless police state" in the Arab world, with a tight system of restrictions on the movement of civilians, independent journalists and other unauthorized individuals. Alongside North Korea and Eritrea, it operated one of the strictest censorship machines that regulated the transfer of information. The Syrian security apparatus was established in the 1970s by Hafez al-Assad, who ran a military dictatorship with the Ba'ath party as its civilian cover to enforce the loyalty of Syrian populations to the Assad family. The Mukhabarat was given free hand to terrorise, torture or murder non-compliant civilians, while public activities of any organized opposition was curbed down with the raw firepower of the army. Bashar and his family were overthrown in December 2024 during the Syrian Revolution with the Fall of the Assad regime and the Fall of Damascus which had forced Bashar to leave Syria for Russia and its capital Moscow for political asylum.

North Korea is claimed to have elements of a police state, from the Juche-style Silla kingdom, to the imposition of a fascist police state by the Japanese, to the totalitarian police state imposed and maintained by the Kim family.

Afghanistan became a police state as well as pervasive surveillance state under the Taliban, since returning to power after the fall of Kabul in August 2021, the Taliban's secret police organization known as the GDI as the regime's efforts to enforce a totalitarian interpretation of Sharia law and eliminate dissent by the new government of the newly established "Islamic Emirate".

In response to government proposals to enact new security measures to curb protests, the AKP-led government of Turkey has been accused of turning Turkey into a police state. Since the 2013 removal of the Muslim Brotherhood-affiliated former Egyptian president Mohamed Morsi from office, the government of Egypt has carried out extensive efforts to suppress certain forms of Islamism and religious extremism (including the aforementioned Muslim Brotherhood), leading to accusations that it has effectively become a "revolutionary police state".

The USSR was a police state. Notable secret police forces in the former USSR were the Cheka, the NKVD, and the KGB. Tools of state control used by the Soviet Union include censorship, forced labour under the Gulag system of labour camps, and deportation and genocide of ethnic minorities and civilians such as Dekulakization, NKVD Order No. 00485 against the Poles and De-Cossackization. Modern-day Russia and Belarus are often described as police states.

The dictatorship of Ferdinand Marcos from the 1970s to early 1980s in the Philippines had many characteristics of a police state.

Hong Kong is perceived by some human rights organizations and press to have implemented the tools of a police state after passing the National Security legislation in 2020, following repeated attempts by People's Republic of China to erode the rule of law in the former British colony.

The United States has been described as a police state since the reelection of President Donald Trump in 2024, particularly due to the mass detention of activists—including green card holders such as Mahmoud Khalil—and immigrants without due process or transparency, alongside unidentified ICE detentions.

Several analysts noted that Mexico underwent a shift toward a police state following the approval of a telecommunications law in 2025. The legislation required the creation of a user registry that includes real-time geolocation data, and the modification of the Unique Population Registry Code (CURP) to include biometric data. These data must be provided by government agencies and private companies that already possess them, and using the CURP would be required to access telephone, cable, and internet services, as well as to make online purchases and travel. Additionally, the government approved the elimination of checks and balances such as the National Institute of Transparency for Access to Information and Personal Data Protection and the Federal Telecommunications Institute. Also, the government was granted the authority to access citizens' phone calls and to censor media content it deems inappropriate or harmful to audiences. Further, although the National Guard was originally created to be under civilian command, its transfer to the military, under full control of the Secretariat of National Defense, was approved.

=== Fictional police states ===
Fictional police states have featured in media ranging from novels to films to video games. George Orwell's novel 1984 describes Britain under the totalitarian Oceanian regime that continuously invokes (and helps to cause) a perpetual war. This perpetual war is used as a pretext for subjecting the people to mass surveillance and invasive police searches. This novel was described by The Encyclopedia of Police Science as "the definitive fictional treatment of a police state, which has also influenced contemporary usage of the term".

== See also ==
- Arbitrary arrest and detention
- Counterintelligence state
- État légal (French)
- Kangaroo court
- Legal abuse
- List of countries by incarceration rate
- Martial law, the suspension of normal civil law during periods of emergency
- Nanny state
- Surveillance state

== Works cited ==
- Barbieri-Low, Anthony J.; Yates, Robin D. S. (2015). Law, State, and Society in Early Imperial China. Sinica Leidensia. Vol. 126. Brill. doi:10.1163/9789004300538. ISBN 978-90-04-30053-8.
- Sanft, Charles (2014) [2013]. Communication and Cooperation in Early Imperial China: Publicizing the Qin Dynasty. Albany: State University of New York Press. ISBN 978-1-4384-5037-7.
