= No to police state =

Ukrainian civil campaign against police brutality

Civil campaign "No to police state" Громадянська кампанія "Ні поліцейській державі"
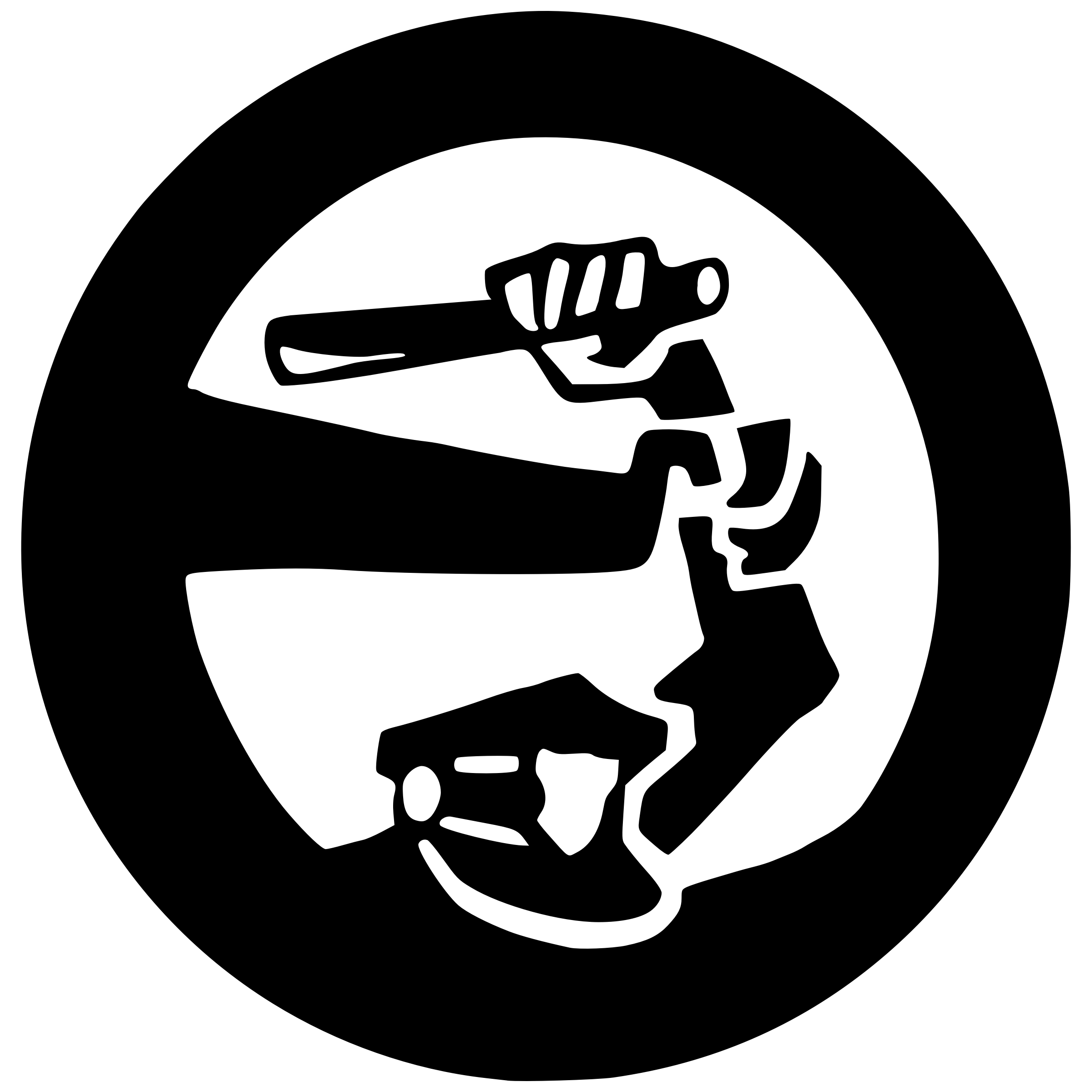
- Image used by activists during the campaign
- Date: May 2010
- Location: Ukraine
- Caused by: The death of student Igor Indylo in the police precinct of Shevchenkivskyi District, Kyiv
- Goals: To force government to conduct a proper investigation and punish guilty police officers
- Methods: Protests
- Status: Unfinished

Parties
| Civil organizations: Vidsich; Direct Action; Foundation of Regional Initiatives; Black Committee; Patriot of Ukraine; other; Political parties: Svoboda; Also: students; journalists; relatives of people killed by the police | Ministry of Internal Affairs; other government authorities |

Lead figures
| | colonel Volodymyr Polishuk (Head of Community liaison center of Kyiv police); major Petro Onyshenko |

The campaign "No to police state" (Ukrainian: Громадянська кампанія "Ні поліцейській державі", romanized: Hromadianska kampaniia "Ni politseiskii derzhavi") was a Ukrainian civil campaign against police brutality that began in 2010, in response to the death of 20-year-old student, Ihor Indylo, while in police custody in Kyiv. The campaign demanded a proper investigation into Indylo's death and the prosecution of those guilty, as well as investigation into other high-profile cases of police misconduct.

== Background ==
Ihor Indylo died in the police precinct of Shevchenkivskyi District, Kyiv, on May 18, 2010. Indylo's family, as well as civil activists and journalists, believed that he was murdered by the police. His death captured public attention and started a civil campaign. In the spring of 2011, Judge Mykola Yashchenko of the Kyiv Court of Appeals ordered further investigation into the incident, ruling the prosecution had not properly established a cause of death.

== Timeline of Indylo's death ==
17 May 2010

- Indylo invites friends to his dormitory to celebrate his birthday
- CCTV shows Indylo enter the police station at 8:38PM
- Indylo is interrogated by officers
- an ambulance is called at 8:52PM
- the ambulance leaves at 9:20PM, Indylo is conscious
- at 9:49 CCTV shows officers dragging Indylo to a cell and leaving him on the floor

18 May 2010

- at 1:23AM, Indylo rolls off a bench and falls approximately 50cm
- no further movement from Indylo after 3AM
- police discover his body at 4:51AM

== Conflicting versions of events ==
=== Police ===
Police made no statements in the first days after Indylo's death, but media attention forced police to make a statement on May 26. The Shevchenkivskyi chief of police Petro Miroshnychenko announced: "We know that Indylo fell three times. First, he was seen laying on the floor in the dormitory. Second, he fell in the presence of his friend. Third, he has fallen from the bench in the police precinct from a height of approximately half a meter."

=== Ukraine Parliamentary Commissioner for Human Rights ===
On June 2, Ukraine Parliamentary Commissioner for Human Rights Nina Karpachova stated that Indylo's death was a murder and police will try to "hush up" the case.

=== Society and media ===
Activists of the "No to police state" campaign pointed out controversial facts of Indylo's death and accused the involved policemen of murder.

On June 18 during a press conference in Kyiv, journalists announced the results of their own investigation. Journalist Dmytro Gnap announced that Indylo was most likely pushed hard, hit the wall and became unconscious because the right half of his brain was injured. A brain hemorrhage started and lasted for nearly 7 hours. Then Indylo was dragged to the room for administrative detainees and left to die. Gnap also announced that Indylo was not tortured and other journalists, who took part in investigation, agreed with him.

MP Yurii Karmazin announced that he did not believe Indylo's injuries to be accidental. According to his experience in law enforcement, such injuries cannot be caused by the fall to the floor. Journalist Olena Bilozerska and human rights activist Tetyana Yablonska also believed that Indylo was tortured.

== Goals ==
According to activists, their goal was to punish all involved in high-profile cases of police brutality.

Among these cases are:

- The death of Igor Indylo in the police precinct of Shevchenkivskyi District in Kyiv, which started the campaign;
- The beating of an activist protecting the Park of Maxim Gorky in Kharkiv from destruction. Police beat the activist by themselves or did nothing to stop other men beating activists;
- The death of Dmytro Yashuk in the police precinct of Sviatoshynskyi District in Kyiv. He was found hanged. Police claimed that he hanged himself, but others were convinced that somebody hanged him;
- The beatings of Denis Malenko, Andriy Bondar and the underage Sergiy Ivanchenko in the police precinct of Leninskiy District in Kropyvnytskyi;
- The beatings of two journalists, Dmytro Stoykov and Yevgen Safonov, by policemen in Zaporizhzhia. The guilty policeman were only reprimanded;
- The systematic obstruction of meetings and protest actions by police.

By June 2010, the demands of activists became more global. They started demanding police reform and amendments to laws.

Activists demanded:

- The strengthening of punishment for misconduct, especially for tortures;
- The expansion of the powers of the Ukraine Parliamentary Commissioner for Human Rights, especially concerning the prevention and combating of torture by policemen;
- The reestablishment of public councils in all territorial divisions of the Ministry of Internal Affairs and establishment of transparent mechanisms for public access to monitor police work.

== Timeline of campaign ==
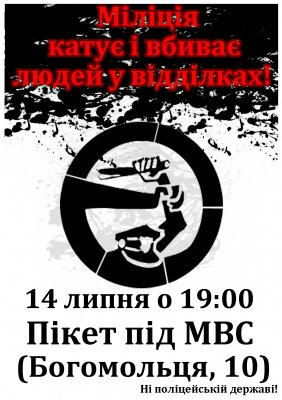
Sticker of campaign asking people to come to a protest action

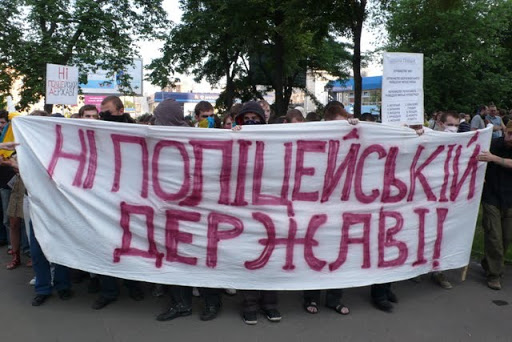
The banner of protest action with text "No to police state"

2010

- May 26 - Activists held an action against the beating of an activist protecting the Park of Maxim Gorky in Kharkiv. The same day the story of Indylo's death was shown on the news. The story told that students claimed that police put pressure on them to force them testify and that Indylo participated in a fight before police came and sat in the police car already beaten and with his head injured. It also said that in the night between May 17 and 18, ambulances came to the precinct four times and emphasized that police made no statements about the death of Indylo.
- June 1 - The first all-Ukrainian protest against police brutality titled "We don't want to fall - we don't want to die" took place. Protesters demanded the replacement of all management at the police precinct of Shevchenkivskyi District, to appoint a parliamentary commission to investigate all recent high-profile cases of police brutality and to publish results of the investigation of the death of Indylo. Protesters promised to repeat protest action if their demands were not met. The action took place in 18 Ukrainian cities: in Kyiv near the police precinct of Shevchenkivskyi District, in Kharkiv, Donetsk, Lviv, Lugansk, Zhytomyr, Khmelnytskyi, Rivne, Kirovograd, Ivano-Frankivsk, Ternopil, Uzhgorod, Yevpatoria and other near regional offices of Ministry of Internal Affairs.
- June 4 - Activists held an action titled "Police is illegal" in Kyiv and Lviv which was caused by another beating of an activist. In Kyiv it took place near the building of Ministry of Internal Affairs. There was also a flashmob to support Kharkiv activists on Maidan Nezalezhnosti in Kyiv.
- June 10 - The second all-Ukrainian protest action against police brutality took place in 12 cities: Kyiv, Donetsk, Zaporizhia, Simferopol, Kherson, Poltava, Zhytomyr, Khmelnytskyi, Rivne, Ternopil, and others.
- June 14 - A roundtable titled "Police and society: opposition or understanding" was held in Lviv with activists and Lviv Oblast police management participating.
- June 18 - The press conference "New murders in Kyiv precincts: versions of police and parents of victims" took place in Kyiv. Police representative Volodymyr Polishuk, journalists and others announced their versions of recent high-profile deaths in police precincts of Kyiv: the death of Igor Indylo in the police precinct of Shevchenkivskyi District and the death of Dmytro Yashuk in the police precinct of Sviatoshynskyi District. A police representative denied officers being involved in the deaths. Journalists, MP Yuriy Karmazin and relatives of Dmytro Yashuk announced the results of their own investigations that rejected the police version.
- June 24 - Activists organized a procession from the Square of Contracts to Mykhailivska Square. Activists performed a theatrical performance titled "The kitchen of death." Apart from demands to punish those guilty in Indylo's death and those of high-profile cases of police brutality, new and more global demands appeared: to strengthen punishment for misconduct, especially for torture by police; to expand the powers of Ukraine Parliamentary Commissioner for Human Rights; to reestablish public councils in all territorial divisions of the Ministry of Internal Affairs; and to establish transparent mechanisms for public access to monitor the work of police and others.
- June 26 - The residents of Lubny participated in protest actions against police brutality titled "Let's protect Lubny residents from Lubny police." organized by the mayor Vasil Koryak. It was caused by the beating of a boy by police and systematic misconduct and brutality of local police.
- June 28 - A flashmob against police brutality took place in Sofiivska Square in Kyiv. People laid on the pavement and their body contours were marked with a chalk.
- July 14 - Another protest action took place near the building of the Ministry of Internal Affairs in Kyiv. It started because the police officers who killed Indylo were not punished. The police officers who beat journalists in Zaporizhzhia were given soft punishment, and activists protecting the Park of Maxim Gorky in Kharkiv were arrested.
- July 22 - A protest action against police permissiveness titled "Enough telling lies!" took place near police precinct of Sviatoshynskyi District in Kyiv. Relatives and friends of Dmytro Yashuk took part. Protesters demanded a proper autopsy of Dmytro Yashuk's body and to learn the names of suspects of the case.
- September 8 and 9 - People involved in solidarity actions were arrested for distribution of leaflets in Kyiv and Lviv.
- September 30 - A press conference about police brutality took place in Kyiv. The police were represented by Volodymyr Polishuk; victims were represented by relatives of Dmytro Yashuk, Kharkiv Human Rights Protection Group and members of the public initiative of Sviatoshynskyi District residents.

== Links ==
- No to police state on vk.com
