= Collapse: How Ukrainians Destroyed the Evil Empire =

2021 documentary miniseries by Suspilne

- Колапс: як українці зруйнували Імперію Зла
- Written by: Oleksandr Zinchenko
- Directed by: Serhiy Lysenko
- Country of origin: Ukraine
- Original languages: Ukrainian; English; Polish; Russian
- No. of seasons: 1
- No. of episodes: 7

Production
- Producer: Yaroslav Lodyhin
- Running time: 336 minutes
- Production company: Esse Production House

Original release
- Release: 23 August – 24 August 2021

Collapse: How Ukrainians Destroyed the Evil Empire (Note: .Ukrainian: Колапс: як українці зруйнували Імперію Зла, romanized: Kolaps: jak Ukrajinci zrujnuvaly Imperiju Zla.) is a 2021 documentary miniseries on the Ukrainian public television channel Pershyi. It reveals details on the 1989–1991 Ukrainian revolution, the disintegration of the Soviet Union and the 1991 Soviet coup attempt that had been kept secret for decades, and places them in the wider historical context. The concept was developed by Yaroslav Lodyhin, directed by Serhiy Lysenko, written by Oleksandr Zinchenko, produced by Vitaliy Sheremetiev, Olha Bregman, Iryna Budnova, Serhiy Nedzelskyi, and Yaroslav Lodyhin. The TV series tells the story of Ukraine's withdrawal from the Soviet Union and the role of Ukrainians in the collapse of the so-called Evil Empire. This is arguably the first attempt to present a wholly Ukrainian perspective, free from the narratives of any foreign state.

The series premiered on television on 23 August 2021. On 23 August, Pershyi broadcast four episodes back-to-back from 5 pm. And on 24 August from 6 pm, the other three were broadcast.

== Background ==
Yaroslav Lodyhin was inspired by Serhii Plokhy's 2015 book The Last Empire: The Final Days of the Soviet Union. With Collapse, the documentary makers sought to tell the most comprehensive story about how Ukraine's declaration of independence made the continued existence of the USSR impossible. The project presents secret documents from the CIA and the KGB, which have never before been used to describe these events. Furthermore, it includes testimonies from participants and witnesses to the events, which have never been examined before, and information from American, Ukrainian, Russian and Polish politicians and historians who have never spoken about the events of 1991 in such detail. Thirty years after the collapse of the ‘Evil Empire’, there now is access to once-classified KGB and CIA documents, as well as the memoirs of those who made the decisions and those who were direct witnesses to and participants in the mass processes that swept across the entire Soviet Union. However, the makers found that to date, there had not been a single film or series that provided a comprehensive account of the collapse of the USSR. It is usually depicted from a Moscow-centric perspective, leaving in the shadows key processes that caused the disintegration of the Soviet Union. Some of these events did not take place in Moscow, but in Kyiv (particularly in the Verkhovna Rada), at Boryspil Airport, at Mikhail Gorbachev’s dacha in Crimea, or elsewhere in Ukraine. The producers have stated that the project is the first attempt to tell the story, in an accessible way, of how Ukrainians brought down the Evil Empire.

== Production ==
The series was produced by a team of documentary filmmakers from Esse Production House, known from winning the Crystal Bear award for Stop-Zemlia at the 71st Berlinale.

The series was written by the author and historian Oleksandr Zinchenko. It was directed by Serhiy Lysenko, who previously directed the Ukrainian historical action film Ex. The cinematographers Serhiy Mykhalchuk (winner of awards at the Berlin and San Sebastián film festivals, director of the films Mamay, The Guide, Ex, The Wild Fields) and Dmytro Sanin (Only a Miracle).

== Protagonists ==
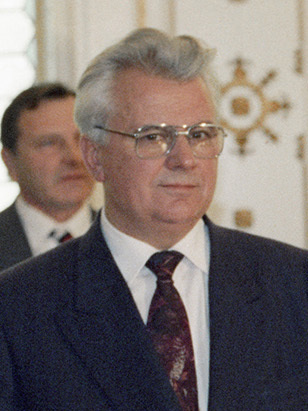
Leonid Kravchuk in 1991

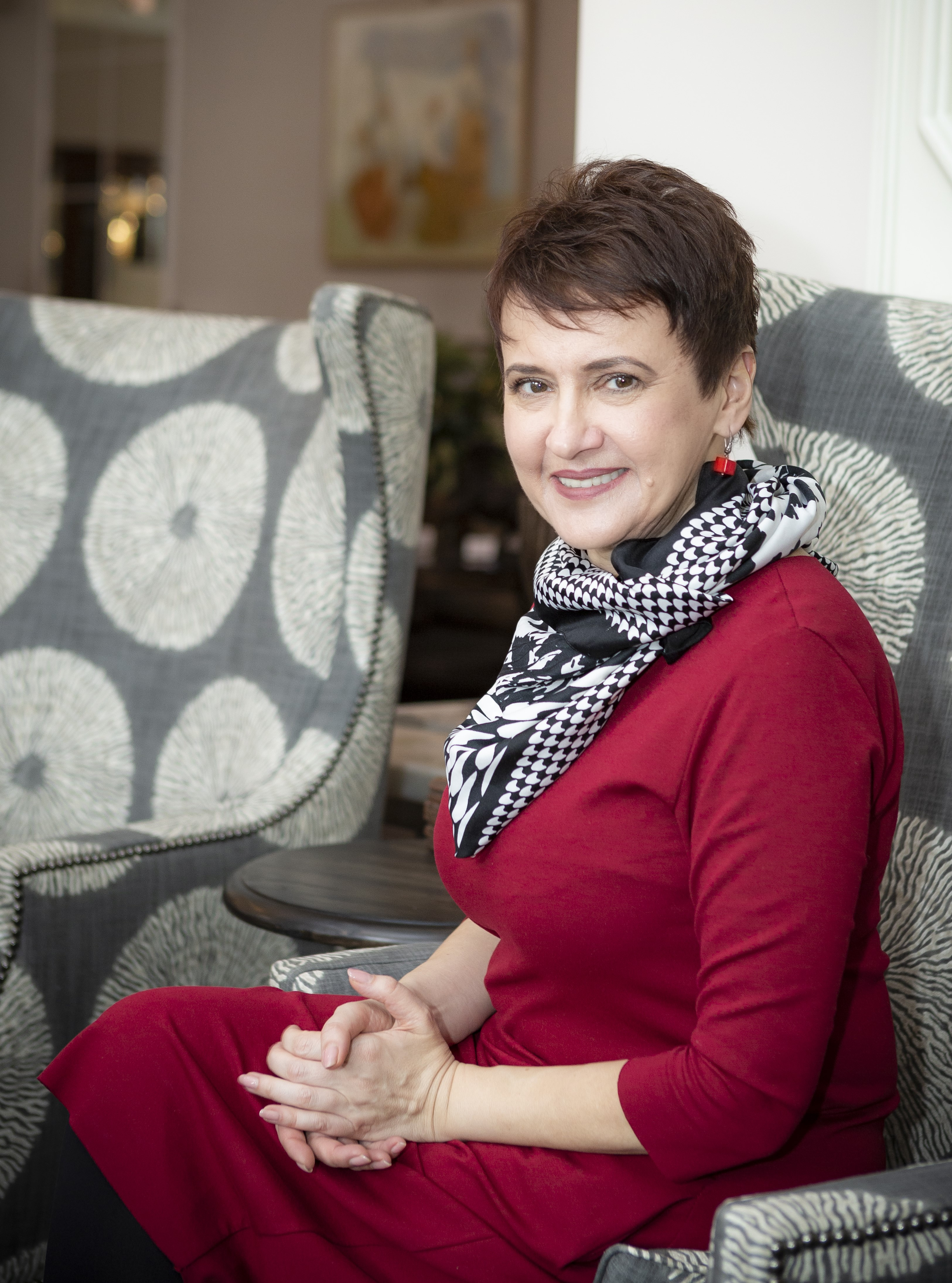
Oksana Zabuzhko in 2021

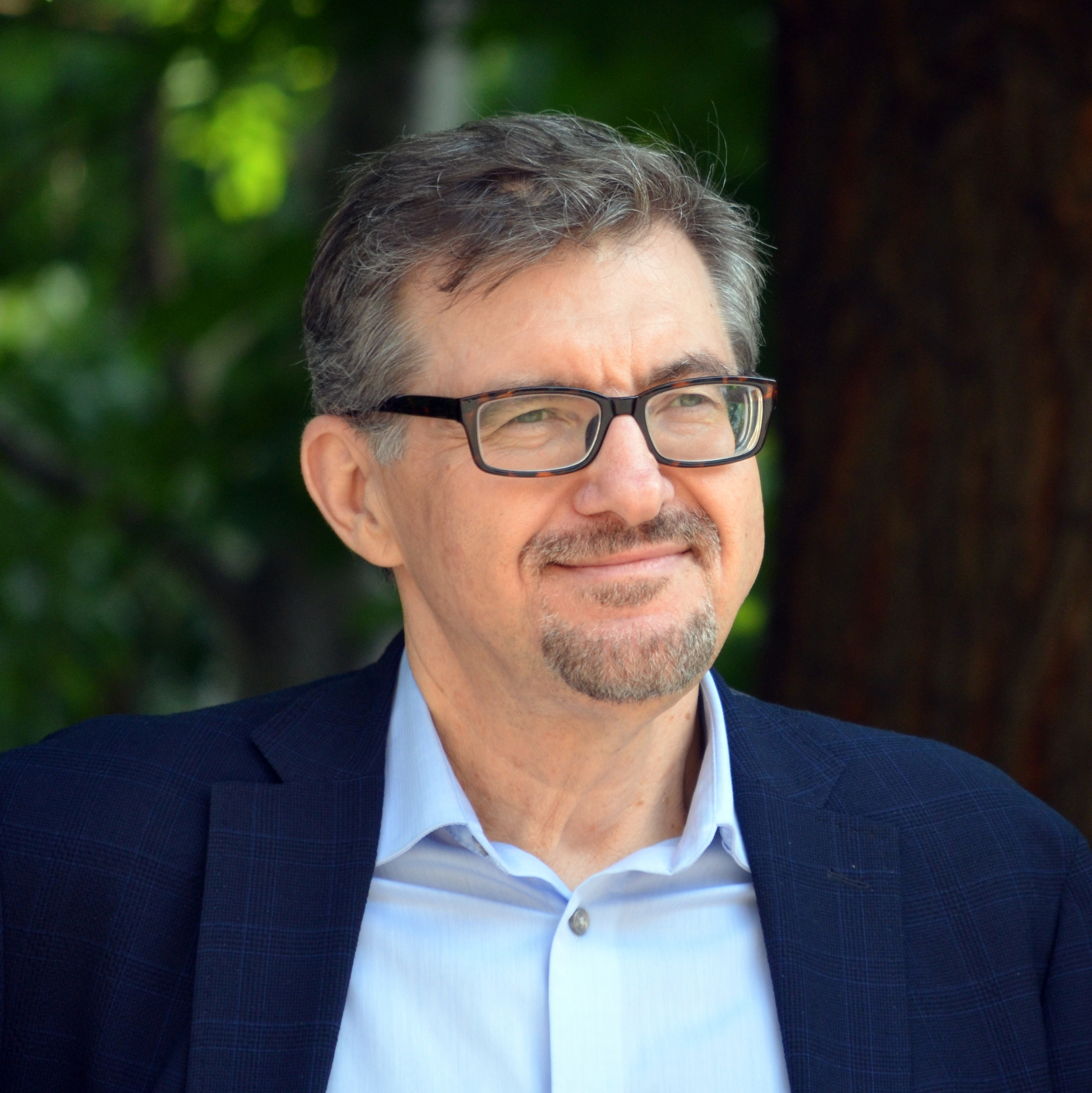
Serhii Plokhy in 2019

Interviewees include:

- Leonid Kravchuk — the first President of Ukraine.
- Oksana Zabuzhko — a writer and poet.
- Lech Wałęsa — President of Poland from 1990 to 1995.
- Vitaly Portnikov — a journalist, columnist and writer. One of the first parliamentary correspondents in the USSR, he has been working with Radio Free Europe/Radio Liberty since 1991.
- Nadiya and Robert McConnell – two of the leading advocates for Ukrainian independence in the United States.
- Serhii Plokhy — a historian and professor of Ukrainian history at Harvard University, where he also serves as director of the Harvard Ukrainian Research Institute. He is one of the leading experts on the history of Eastern Europe.
- Yuriy Kostenko — a Ukrainian politician and Member of Parliament for four terms.
- Maria Burmaka — a Ukrainian singer who took part in the 1989 "Chervona Ruta" festival.
- Yevgeny Kiselyov — a journalist and political commentator.
- Yevhen Marchuk — the first head of the Security Service of Ukraine. Prior to that, he was a member of the government of the Ukrainian SSR.
- Adam Michnik — a Polish dissident, journalist and publisher. Associated with Solidarity and a close associate of Lech Wałęsa.
- Kateryna Yushchenko — an economist and the wife of Ukraine's third president, Viktor Yushchenko.
- Mykola Veresen — a journalist and television presenter. In 1991, following the failure of the State Committee for the State of Emergency and the adoption of the Act of Declaration of Independence of Ukraine, he raised the blue-and-yellow flag above the building that now houses the Presidential Administration.
- Viktor Pynzenyk — an economist, academic, politician. Member of the Ukrainian Parliament for six terms.
- Marta Dyczok — a Canadian academic of Ukrainian descent.
- Artemy Troitsky — a Russian journalist and music critic.
- Gennady Burbulis — a Russian politician who represented Russia at the signing of the Belovezha Accords.
- Volodymyr Filenko — a Ukrainian politician and Member of Parliament for four terms.
- Ivan Zayets – a Ukrainian opposition politician of People's Movement of Ukraine (Rukh)
- Yaroslav Kendzior – a Ukrainian journalist, human rights activist and former Rukh Member of Parliament
- Oleksandr Moroz – a Ukrainian communist politician
- Roman Popadiuk – American foreign press secretary to president George H. W. Bush, from 1992 1st United States Ambassador to Ukraine
- Danuta Kuroń – a Polish trade union activist of Solidarity
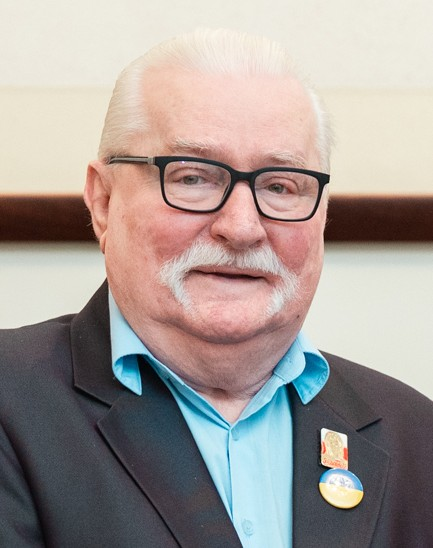
Lech Wałęsa in 2026

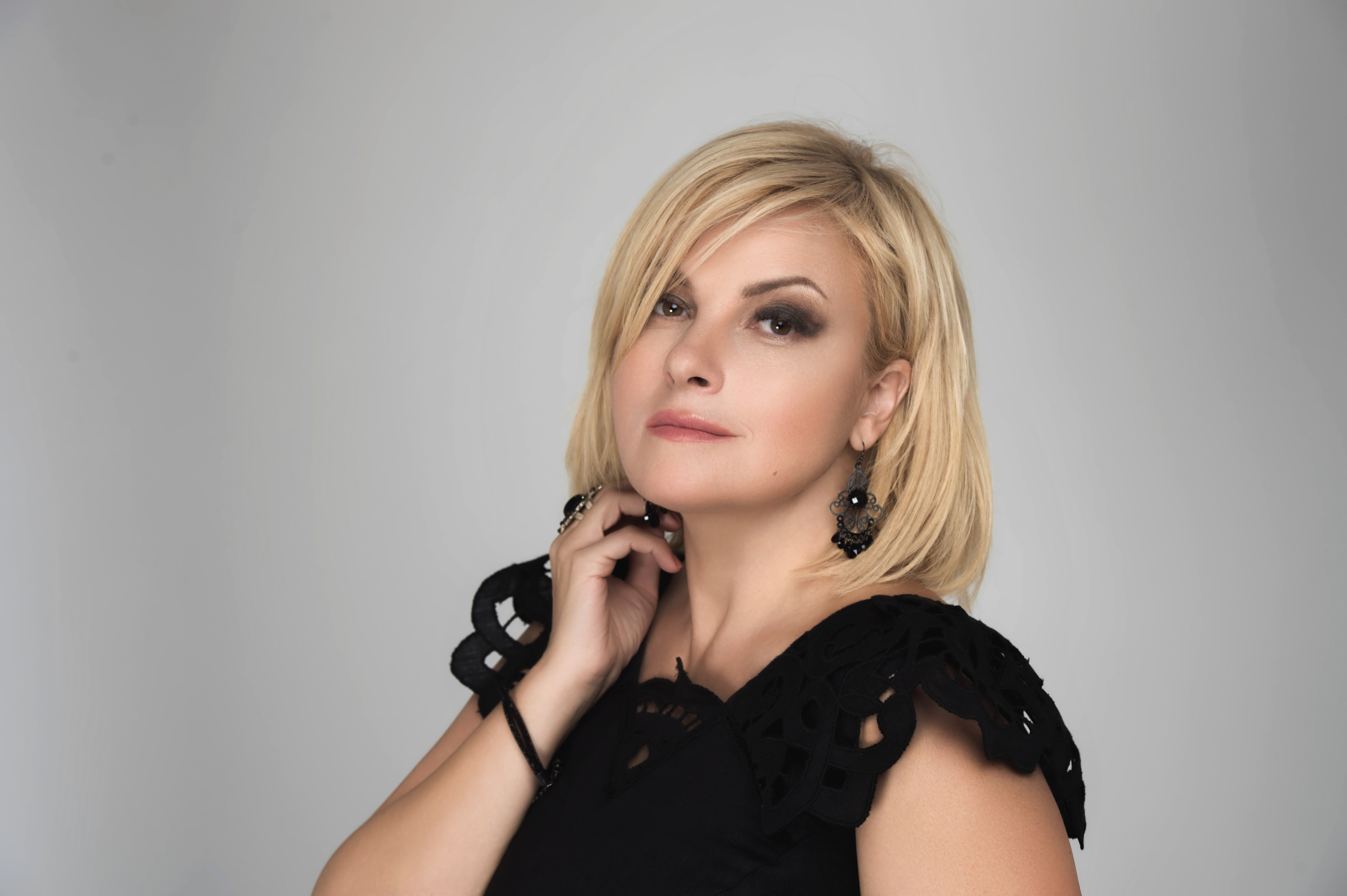
Maria Burmaka 2018

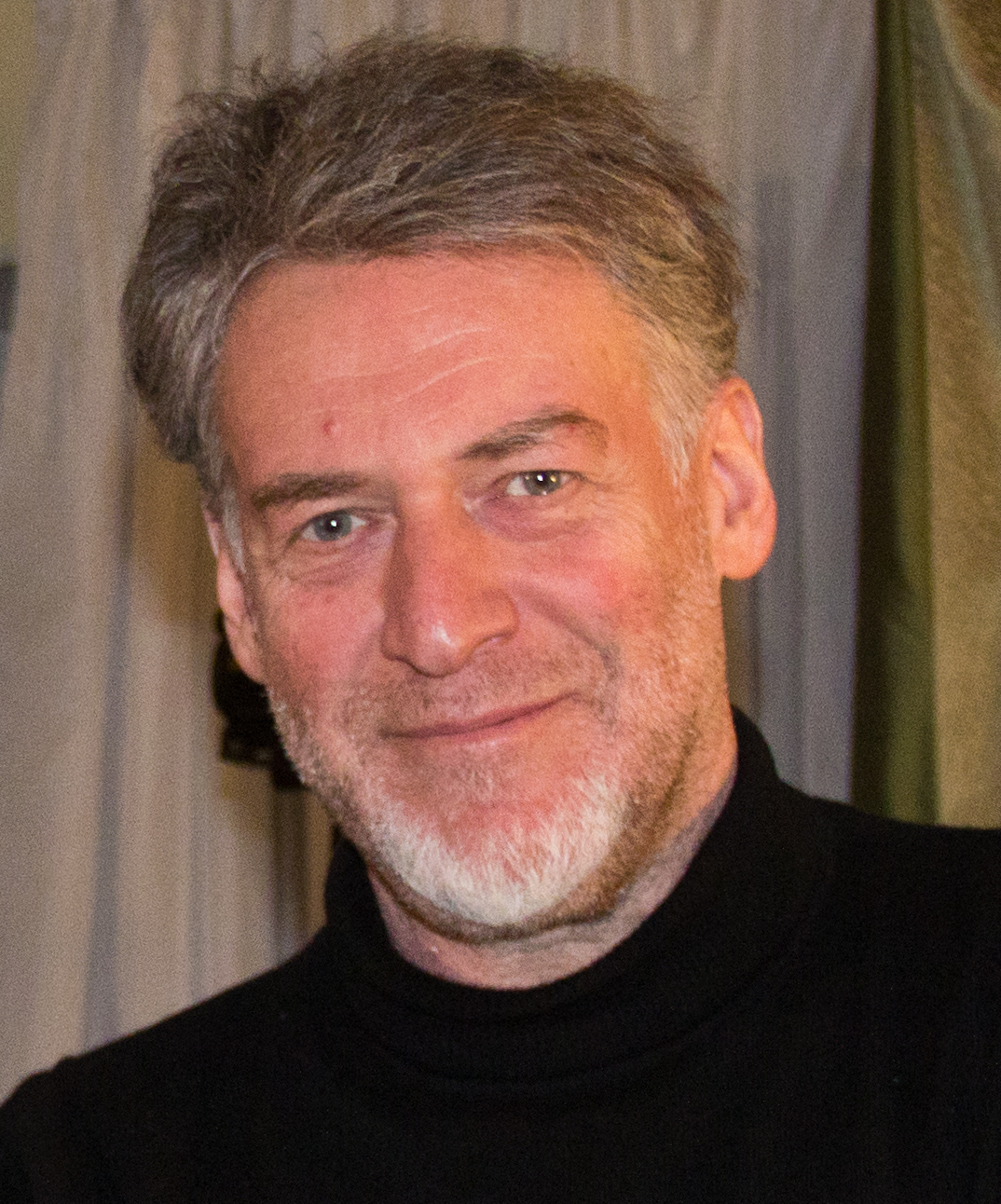
Artemy Troitsky in 2013

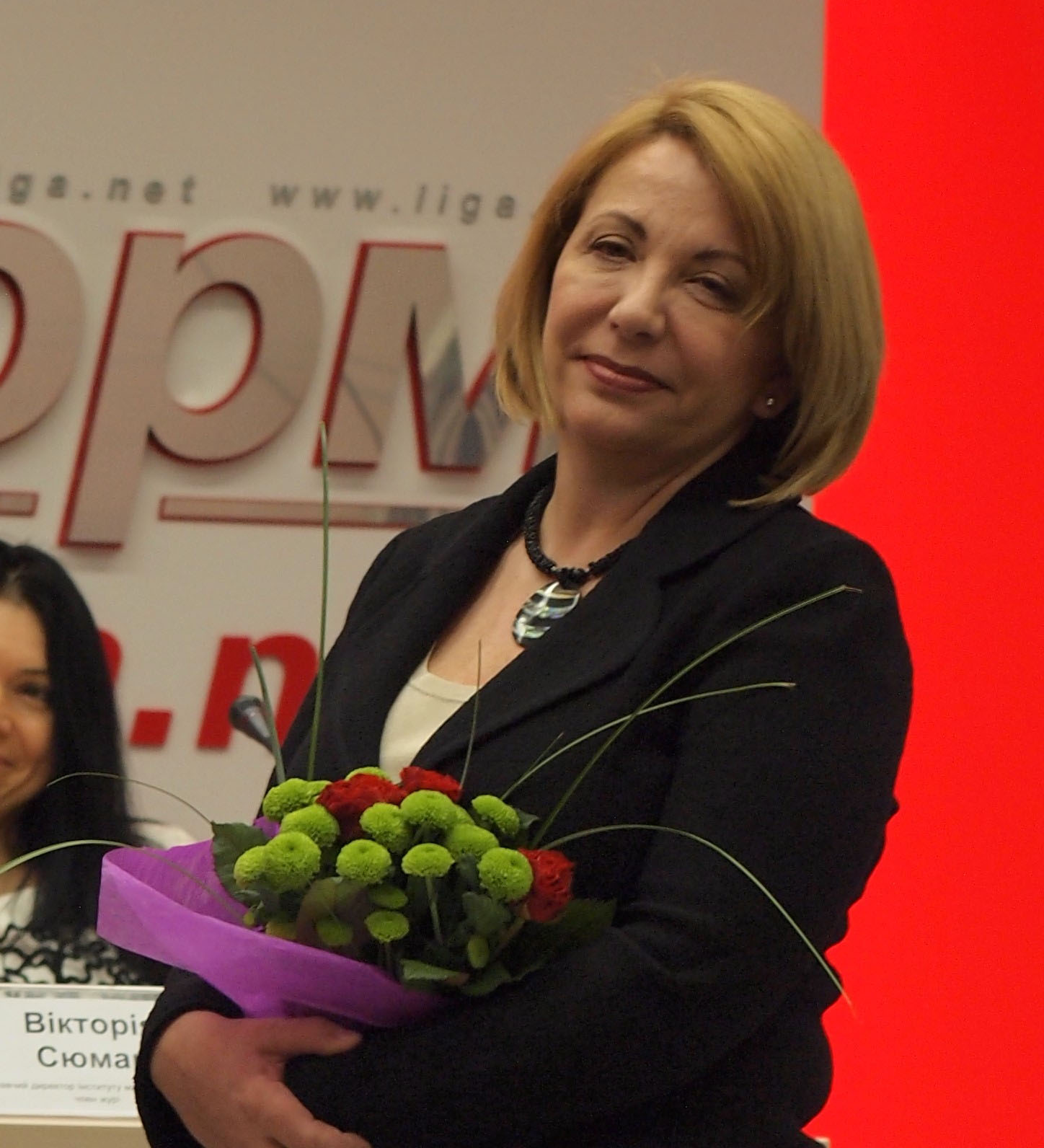
Kateryna Yushchenko in 2012

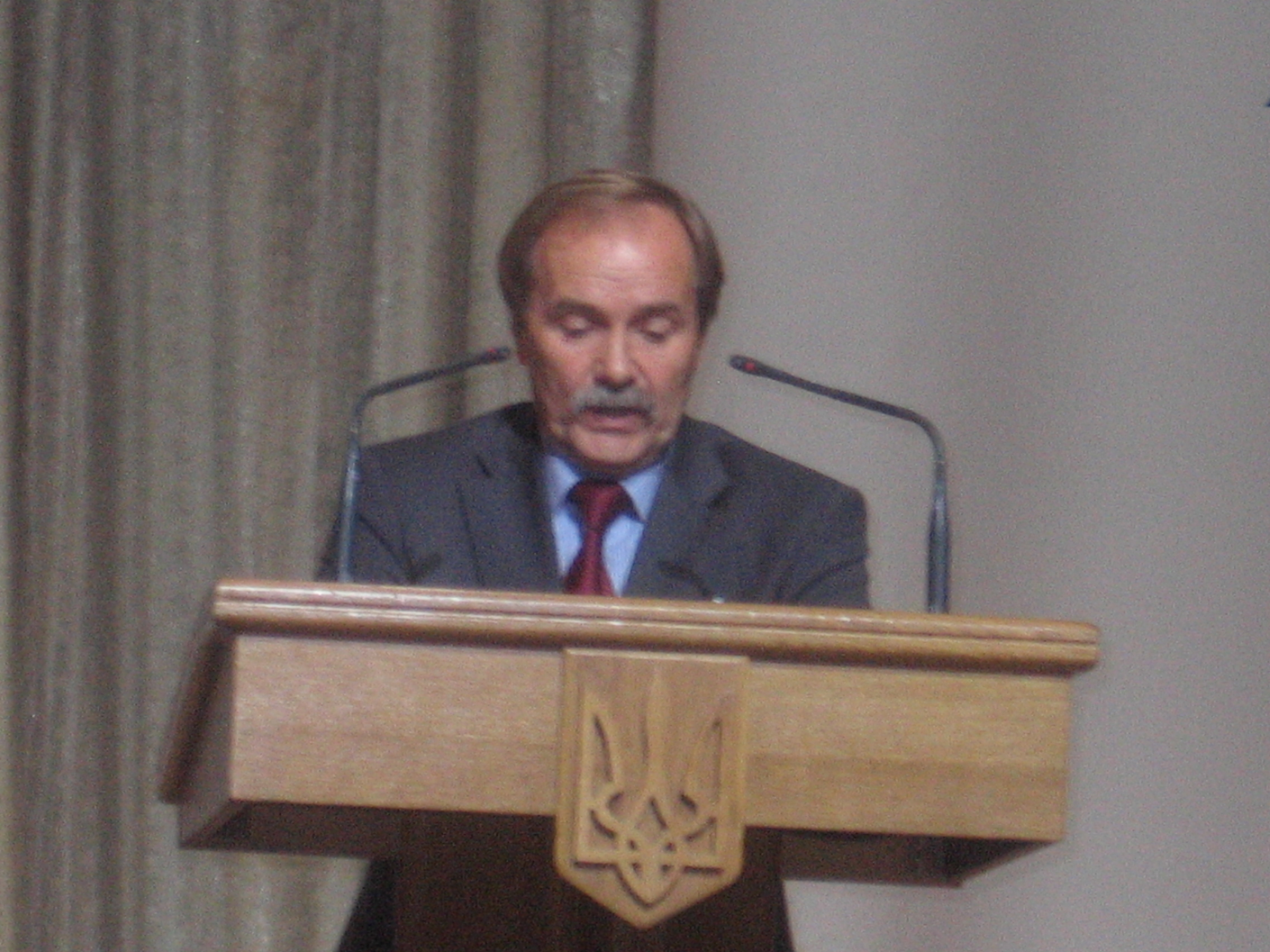
Ivan Zayets in 2009 (not to be confused with Viacheslav Chornovil)

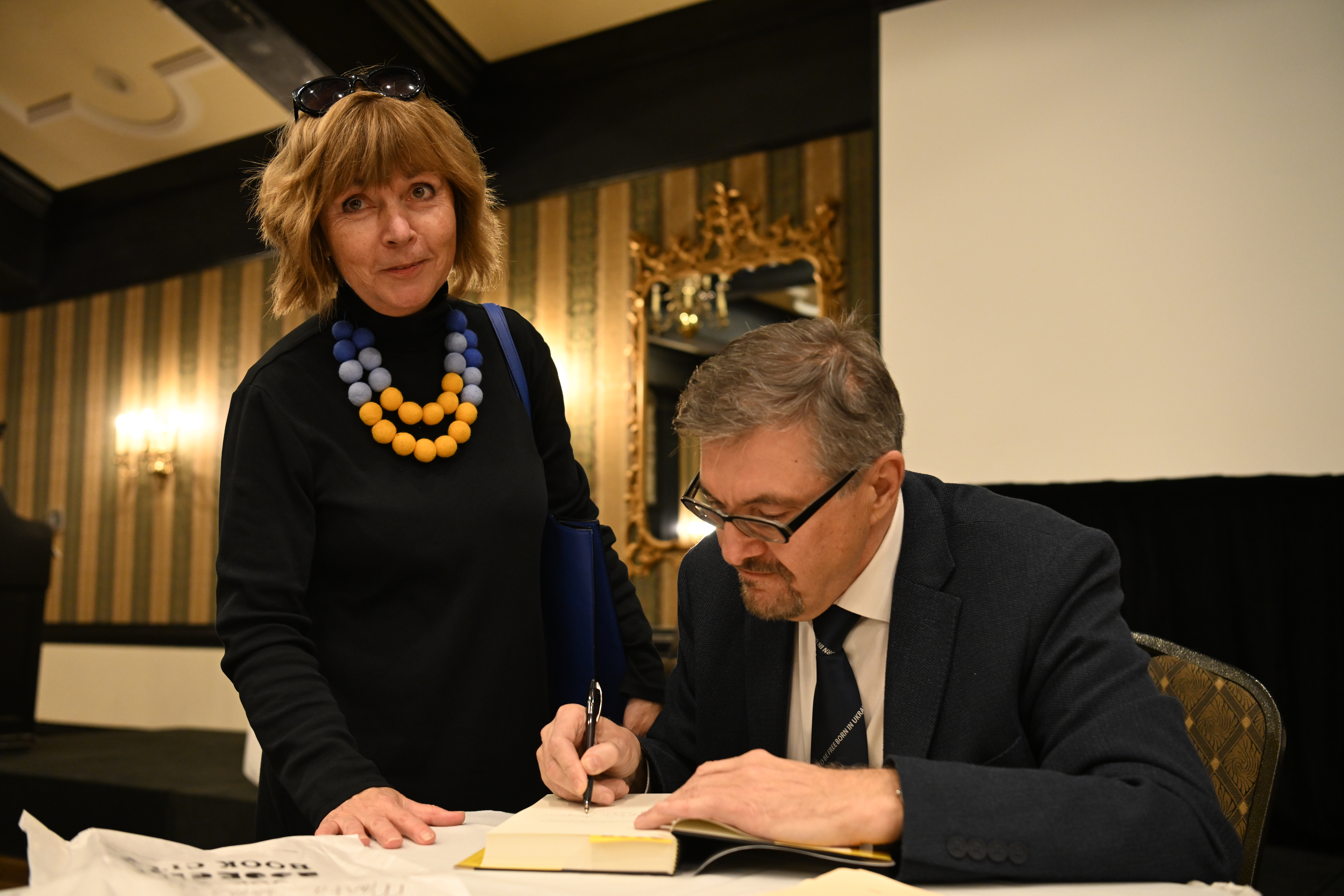
Marta Dyczok and Serhii Plokhy in 2023

== Episodes ==
The series consists of 7 episodes. Essentially, each episode covers a single day. The final episode describes events that unfolded over a period of about six months. Each episode also explores (using flashbacks) some of the key reasons behind the collapse of the USSR and Ukraine's declaration of independence: economic factors and the international context. For example, the domino effect that unfolded in Central and Eastern Europe between 1989 and 1991. Did Poland have any influence on Ukraine? What triggered the chain reaction in Ukraine? It was a turbulent cascade of events. The authors managed to locate a lost recording of the session of the Verkhovna Rada of Ukraine of 24 August 1991, when the Act of Declaration of Independence of Ukraine was adopted.

Episode titles:

1. 19 August: "The Day of Fear" («День страху»).
2. 20 August: "The Night of Anger" («Ніч гніву»).
3. 21 August: "No Euphoria" («Без ейфорії»).
4. 22 August: "Default" («Дефолт»). Contains long-term narrative about the economic crisis since the Era of Stagnation through the 1990s.
5. 23 August: "The Domino Effect" («Ефект Доміно»).
6. 24 August: "Independence" («Незалежність»).
7. 25 August – December 1991: "On the Verge of Nuclear War. The Collapse at Christmas" («На межі ядерної війни. Колапс на Різдво»).

== Screening ==
To mark the 30th anniversary of Ukrainian independence in 2021, the series was broadcast on Suspilne.
