= Central Park (Kharkiv) =

City park in Kharkiv, Ukraine

Coordinates: 50°01′12″N 36°14′42″E

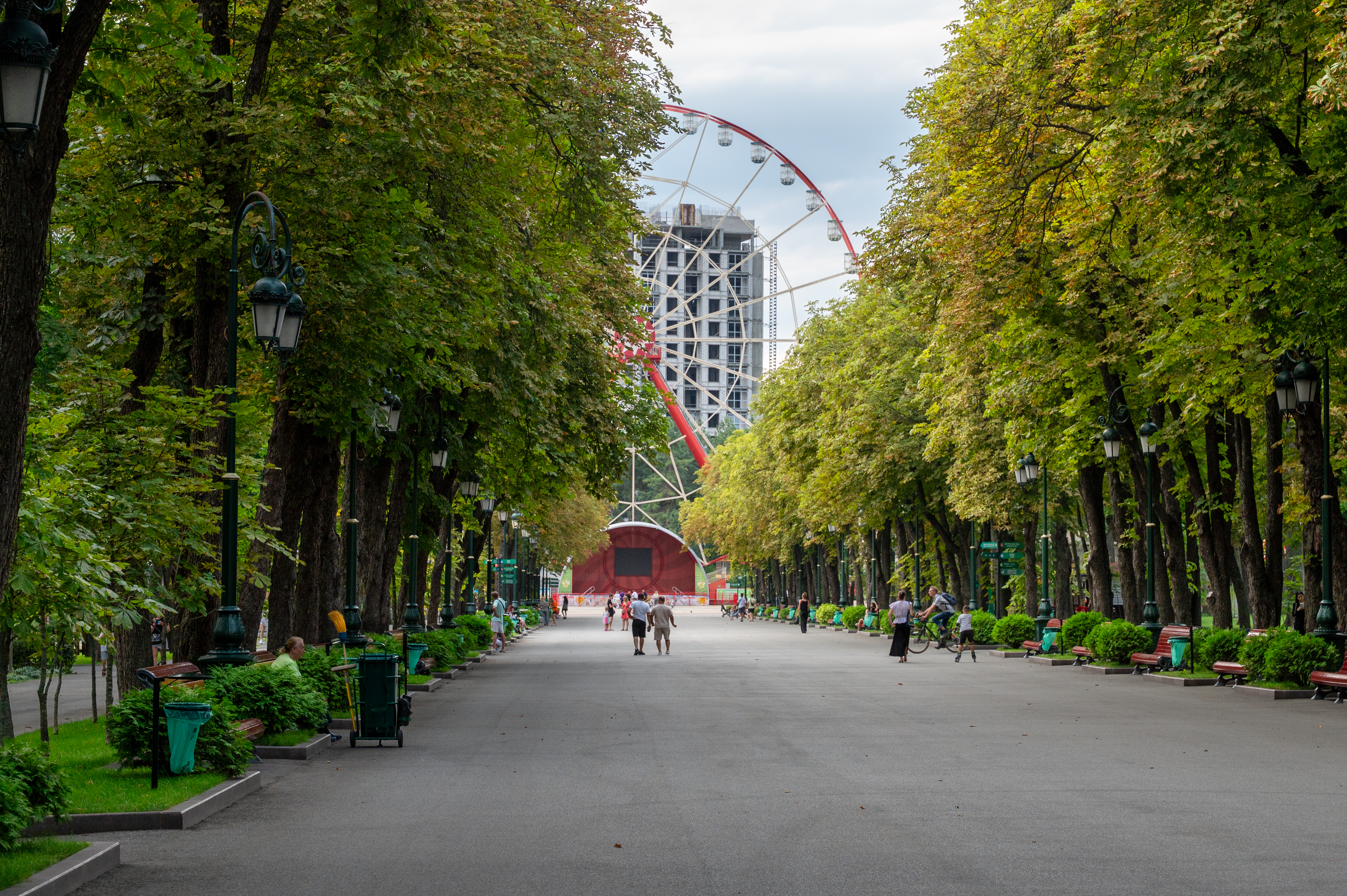
- Interactive map of Central Park
- Location: Kharkiv, Ukraine
- Area: 130 hectares (320 acres)
- Open: 1907
- Website: centralpark.kh.ua

Immovable Monument of Local Significance of Ukraine
- Official name: «Міський парк» (City park)
- Type: Architecture
- Reference no.: 7419-Ха

Central Park for Culture and Recreation (Ukrainian: Парк культури і відпочинку) is a park in the city of Kharkiv, Ukraine. It is bounded to the south by Vesnina Street, to the east by Sumska Street, to the north by the so-called elite private settlement construction, and to the west by Dynamo Street. It was laid out in 1893–1895 and opened in 1907.

== History ==
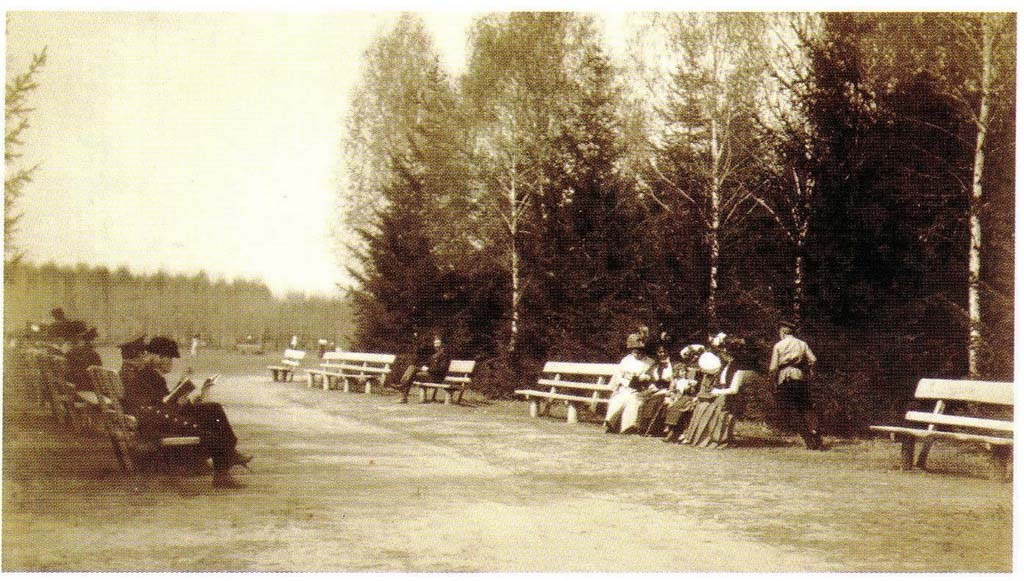
Park before the revolution

The origin of the park was from the City governing council who "put forth a proposition to plant trees on 20-40,000 square metres on both sides of the Sumskoy road" The idea was that the area would be used for horse riding in a similar manner to the Boulogne Forest. Teachers, university students, and school students all assisted voluntarily with the tree planting. Each tree had a plaque planted next to it showing who had planted it.

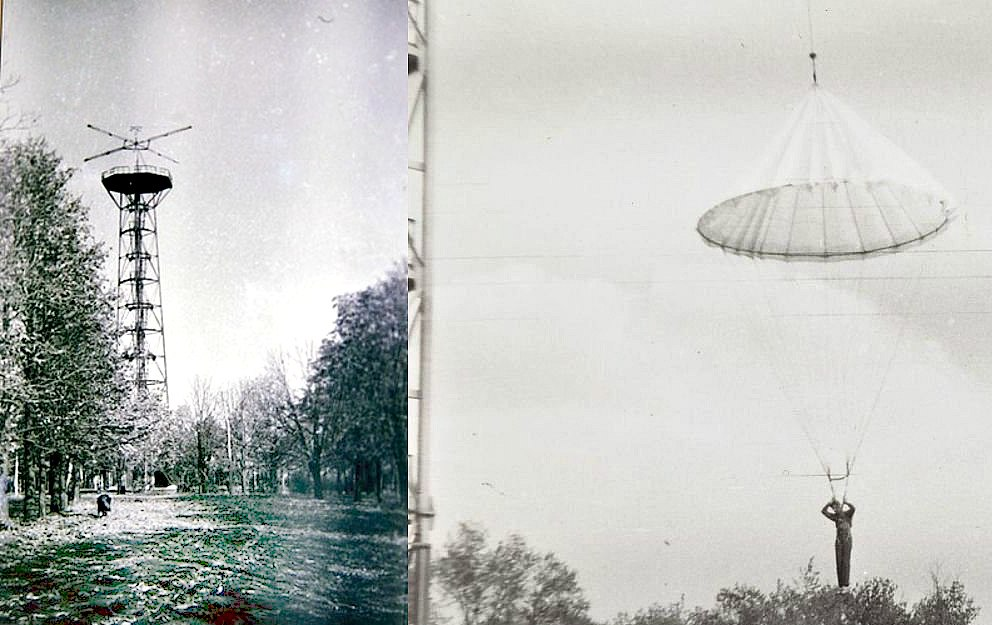
Parachute tower in the park

In 1899 in honour of the 100th birthday of Alexander Pushkin the size of the park was doubled.

In 1932 the park was increased again in size to its ultimate size of 130 hectares.

It was in 1938 that the park was given its name of Maxim Gorky Central Park for Culture and Recreation, two years after the death of influential Russian and Soviet writer Maxim Gorky. In 1940 the first Children's railway, 3.6 km long, was opened in the park.

During the Second World War all the facilities in the park were ruined and thousands of trees were felled, including the city's only cedar grove. On the cessation of hostilities the Kharkiv community immediately set about rebuilding the park.

In the 1950s and 1960s 1.2 million people per year would visit the park.

A statue of Maxim Gorky was located near the entrance of the park from 1980 until 1999. It was restorated in 2006, but replaced by a glass squirrel sculpture in 2011.

In 2006 the city restored the colonnade at the entrance to the park and in 2007 the park's fountain was restored. The park features tennis courts, a movie theatre, a children's railway, and an aerial cableway.

In 2005 the City authorities considered the possibility of building a tunnel under the park to relieve traffic congestion. This proposal did not proceed however the authorities did proceed with a plan to build a road though the park. To this end, in February 2008, 9.9 hectares of the park from Sumskaya Street to Novgorodskaya Street were transferred to the Department of Construction, Maintenance and Reconstruction for the building of a road, a hotel complex and some private dwellings. At the same time another 12.8 hectares of park land was granted a change of status to enable the construction of residential and public buildings. These grants effectively reduced the park's size to 107 hectares.

In May 2009, the Ukrainian Parliament pronounced a moratorium on construction works in parks and forest parks but nevertheless on 19 May 2010 the Executive Committee of the Kharkiv City Council made a decision to cut 500 trees and continue with building a road across the park. This decision by the Council led to considerable public protest from May to July 2010 leading to many arrests and imprisonments.

The park was severely damaged during the 2022 Battle of Kharkiv.

On 13 June 2023 the Kharkiv City Council renamed the park (from the official name Central Park of Culture and Recreation named after M. Gorky) to Central Park of Culture and Recreation.
