= Rechtsstaat =

Continental European legal doctrine

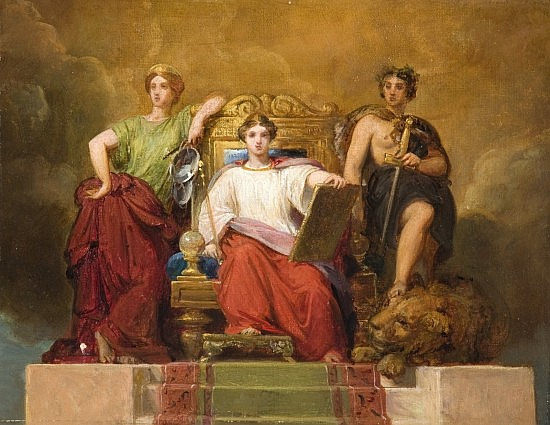
The Law, between Justice and State Power, allegory by Dominique Antoine Magaud (1899)

Rechtsstaat (German: [ˈʁɛçt͡sˌʃtaːt]; lit. "state of law"; "legal state") is a doctrine in continental European legal thinking, originating in German jurisprudence. It can also be translated as "rule-of-law state", "legal state", "state of justice", or "state based on justice and integrity". It means a state in which everyone, especially the government, is subject to the law.

A Rechtsstaat is a constitutional state in which the exercise of governmental power is based on and constrained by the law. It is closely related to "constitutionalism" which is often tied to the Anglo-American concept of the rule of law, but differs from it in also emphasizing what is just (i.e., a concept of moral rightness based on ethics, rationality, law, natural law, religion, or equity). Thus it is the opposite of Obrigkeitsstaat (German: [ˈoːbʁɪçkaɪ̯t͡sʃtaːt]) or Nichtrechtsstaat (a state based on the arbitrary use of power), and of Unrechtsstaat (a non-Rechtsstaat with the capacity to become one after a period of historical development).

In a Rechtsstaat, the power of the state is limited in order to protect citizens from the arbitrary exercise of authority. The citizens share legally based civil liberties and can use the courts. In continental European legal thinking, the Rechtsstaat is contrasted with both the police state and the État légal.

== Immanuel Kant ==
German writers usually place the theories of German philosopher Immanuel Kant (1724–1804) at the beginning of their accounts of the movement toward the Rechtsstaat. Kant did not use the word Rechtsstaat, but contrasted an existing state (Staat) with an ideal, constitutional state (Republik). His approach is based on the supremacy of a country's written constitution. This supremacy must create guarantees for implementation of his central idea: a permanent peaceful life as a basic condition for the happiness of its people and their prosperity. Kant proposed that this happiness be guaranteed by a moral constitution agreed on by the people and thus, under it, by moral government.

Kant's political teaching may be summarized in a phrase: republican government and international organization. In more characteristically Kantian terms, it is doctrine of the state based upon the law (Rechtsstaat) and of eternal peace. Indeed, in each of these formulations, both terms express the same idea: that of legal constitution or of 'peace through law.' ... Taken simply by itself, Kant's political philosophy, being essentially a legal doctrine, rejects by definition the opposition between moral education and the play of passions as alternate foundations for social life. The state is defined as the union of men under law. The state rightly so called is constituted by laws which are necessary a priori because they flow from the very concept of law. A regime can be judged by no other criteria nor be assigned any other functions, than those proper to the lawful order as such."

The actual expression Rechtsstaat appears to have been introduced by Carl Theodor Welcker in 1813, but it was popularised by Robert von Mohl's book Die deutsche Polizeiwissenschaft nach den Grundsätzen des Rechtsstaates ("German Policy Science according to the Principles of the Constitutional State", 1832–33). Von Mohl contrasted government through policy with government, in a Kantian spirit, under general rules.

== Principles of the Rechtsstaat ==
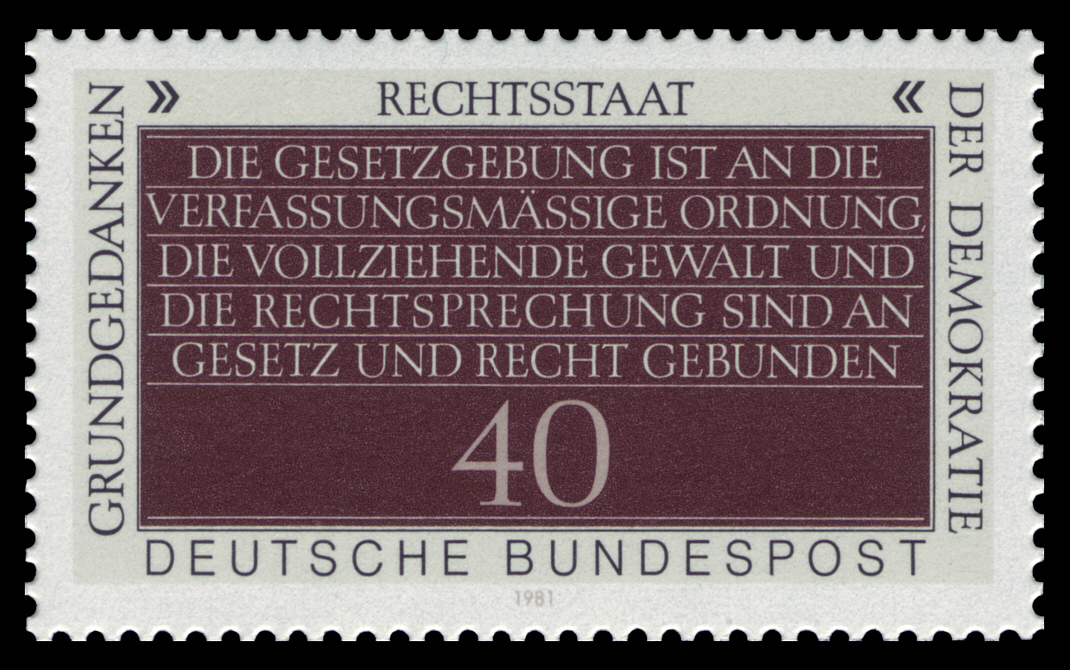
German stamp (1981). Rechtsstaat, Fundamental Concept of Democracy – "The legislature is bound by the constitutional order, the executive and the judiciary by law and right." (Article 20(3) GG)

The most important principles of the Rechtsstaat are:

- The state is based on the supremacy of national constitution and guarantees the safety and constitutional rights of its citizens
- Civil society is an equal partner to the state
- Separation of powers, with the executive, legislative, and judiciary branches of government limiting one another's power and providing for checks and balances
- The judicature and the executive are bound by law (not acting against the law), and the legislature is bound by constitutional principles
- Both the legislature and democracy itself are bound by elementary constitutional rights and principles
- Transparency of state acts and the requirement of providing a reason for all state acts
- Review of state decisions and state acts by independent organs, including an appeal process
- Hierarchy of laws and the requirement of clarity and definiteness
- Reliability of state actions, protection of past dispositions made in good faith against later state actions, prohibition of retroactivity
- Principle of the proportionality of state action

== Russian model of Rechtsstaat: a concept of the legal state ==
The Russian legal system, borne out of transformations in the 19th century under the reforms of Emperor Alexander II, is based primarily on the German legal tradition. It was from here that Russia borrowed a doctrine of Rechtsstaat, which literally translates as "legal state". The concept of "legal state" (Правовое государство, pravovoe gosudarstvo) is a fundamental (but undefined) principle that appears in the very first dispositive provision of Russia's post-Communist constitution: "The Russian Federation – Russia – constitutes a democratic federative legal state with a republican form of governance." Similarly, the first dispositive provision of Ukraine's Constitution declares: "Ukraine is a sovereign and independent, democratic, social, legal state." The effort to give meaning to the expression "legal state" is anything but theoretical.

Valery Zorkin, President of the Constitutional Court of Russia, wrote in 2003:

Becoming a legal state has long been our ultimate goal, and we have certainly made serious progress in this direction over the past several years. However, no one can say now that we have reached this destination. Such a legal state simply cannot exist without a lawful and just society. Here, as in no other sphere of our life, the state reflects the level of maturity reached by society.

The Russian concept of legal state adopted many elements of constitutional economics. Constitutional economics is a field of economics and constitutionalism that describes and analyzes the specific interrelationships between constitutional issues and functioning of the economy, including the budget process. The term "constitutional economics" was used by American economist James M. Buchanan as a name for a new academic sub-discipline that in 1986 brought him the Nobel Prize in Economic Sciences for his "development of the contractual and constitutional bases for the theory of economic and political decision-making." According to Buchanan, the ethic of constitutionalism is a key for constitutional order and "may be called the idealized Kantian world" where the individual "who is making the ordering, along with substantially all of his fellows, adopts the moral law as a general rule for behaviour". Buchanan rejects "any organic conception of the state as superior in wisdom, to the individuals who are its members." He believes that a constitution, intended for use by at least several generations of citizens, must be able to adjust itself for pragmatic economic decisions and to balance interests of the state and society against those of individuals and their constitutional rights to personal freedom and private happiness. The standards of constitutional economics when used during annual budget planning, as well as the latter's transparency to the civil society, are of primary importance to the implementation of the rule of law. Moreover, the availability of an effective court system, to be used by the civil society in situations of unfair government spending and executive impoundment of any previously authorized appropriations, becomes a key element for the success of any influential civil society. Some Russian researchers support an idea that, in the 21st century, the concept of the legal state has become not only a legal but also an economic concept, at least for Russia and many other transitional and developing countries.

== See also ==
- Far-right politics in Germany (1945–present)
- Nuremberg Principles
