= Our Secrets =

2026 short film by Lenti Liang

- Tian Tian De Mi Mi
- Directed by: Lenti Liang
- Screenplay by: Lenti Liang
- Produced by: Ji Shuofan
- Starring: Huiying Zhu, Hui Yi, Jianyu Wang
- Cinematography: Becky Baihui Chen
- Production company: USC School of Cinematic Arts
- Distributed by: PARALLAX FILMS - Midnight Blur Films
- Release date: 2026
- Running time: 15 minutes
- Countries: United States, China
- Language: Mandarin Chinese

Our Secrets (Chinese: Tian Tian De Mi Mi) is a 2026 short film written, directed and produced by Lenti Liang, made as her thesis film for the USC School of Cinematic Arts. Set in Guangzhou, China, the film follows a teenage girl, Tian Tian, whose visit to a family doctor turns into an experience of medical abuse, and explores her mother's inability to recognize or address it.

The film premiered in the Cinefondation section of the 2026 Cannes Film Festival, where Liang received the 2026 L'Oréal Paris Lights On Women's Worth Award.

== Plot ==
In early spring in Guangzhou, Tian Tian, a teenage girl, begins to sense a quiet awakening of desire. During a spinal check-up, physical contact unsettles her, leaving her with a mix of confusion and unease. She later tries to speak with her mother, but the conversation falters. Much remains unspoken between them.

== Production ==
Our Secrets was made as Liang's MFA thesis film at the USC School of Cinematic Arts. Liang has said the story is drawn from a personal experience of medical mistreatment she went through at age eighteen, which she had not previously discussed publicly, and that making the film was part of a healing process, including in her relationship with her own mother.

== Release ==
The film was selected for Cinefondation, the section of the Cannes Film Festival dedicated to student and film-school productions from all over the world, as one of 19 works chosen from 2,750 submissions for the festival's 29th edition. It screened as part of La Cinef's Programme 4 on 21 May 2026 at the Buñuel Theatre.

== Awards ==
On 22 May 2026, Liang received the 2026 L'Oréal Paris Lights On Women's Worth Award, presented by actress Gillian Anderson at a ceremony in Cannes during the 2026 Cannes Film Festival. The award, now in its seventh edition, recognizes emerging female directors of short films throughout the world.

== See also ==
- Cinefondation
- 2026 Cannes Film Festival
