= A Man of His Time =

2026 film by Emmanuel Marre

- French promotional poster
- French: Notre Salut
- Literally: Our Salvation
- Directed by: Emmanuel Marre
- Written by: Emmanuel Marre
- Produced by: Alexandre Perrier; Sébastien Andres; Alice Lemaire; Jules Grange; François-Pierre Clavel
- Starring: Swann Arlaud; Sandrine Blancke; Mathieu Perotto; Jean-Baptiste Marre; Harpo Guit; Mathilde Abd-el-Kader; Florian Surrier; Claudine Barthel-Fournier
- Cinematography: Olivier Boonjingp
- Edited by: Nicolas Rumpl
- Production companies: Michigan Films; Kidam; Condor Films; Les Films Pelléas; Unité; Les Films de Pierre; The Ink Connection; Actarus; France 2 Cinéma; RTBF; Be tv & Orange; Proximus
- Distributed by: Condor Distribution (France); Cinéart (Belgium)
- Release dates: 20 May 2026 (Cannes); 30 September 2026 (France); 30 September 2026 (Belgium)
- Running time: 155 minutes
- Countries: France; Belgium
- Language: French

A Man of His Time (French: Notre Salut, lit. 'Our Salvation') is a 2026 drama film written and directed by Emmanuel Marre, and loosely based on his great-grandfather's life. A co-production of France and Belgium, it stars Swann Arlaud as Henri Marre, a collaborationist during the Vichy France, a puppet state established by Nazi Germany during the World War II.

The film had its world premiere in the main competition of the 79th Cannes Film Festival on 20 May 2026, where it won the Best Screenplay prize and three parallel prizes. It was theatrically released in France and Belgium on 30 September.

== Synopsis ==
In 1940, Henri Marre arrives in Vichy with aspirations to publish his manuscript Notre Salut, which he hopes will rescue France. Day after day, he dedicates himself to collaborating with the Vichy regime.

== Cast ==
- Swann Arlaud as Henri Marre
- Sandrine Blancke as Paulette Marre
- Mathieu Perotto as Gasque
- Jean-Baptiste Marre as Maux
- Harpo Guit as Harpo
- Mathilde Abd-el-Kader as Corinne
- Florian Surrier as Theophile
- Claudine Barthel-Fournier as Arlette

== Production ==
=== Development ===
A co-production between France and Belgium, A Man of His Time was produced by Michigan Films (Belgium) and Kidam (France), in co-production with Condor Films, Les Films Pelléas, Unité, Les Films de Pierre, The Ink Connection, Actarus, France 2 Cinéma, RTBF, Be tv & Orange, and Proximus. Arlaud's character, while fictional, was inspired by Emmanuel Marre's own great-grandfather Henri Marre, who was a provincial inspector at the Limoges office of the Commission for the Fight against Unemployment in the 1940s.

=== Filming ===
Principal photography began on 14 April 2025, with shooting scheduled to last nine weeks. Filming took place in Vichy, Limoges, Bordeaux and Brussels.

Initially intending to shoot on 16mm film, for budget, shot length and camera size reasons, cinematographer Olivier Boonjingp chose to shoot with two Digital Bolex cameras instead.

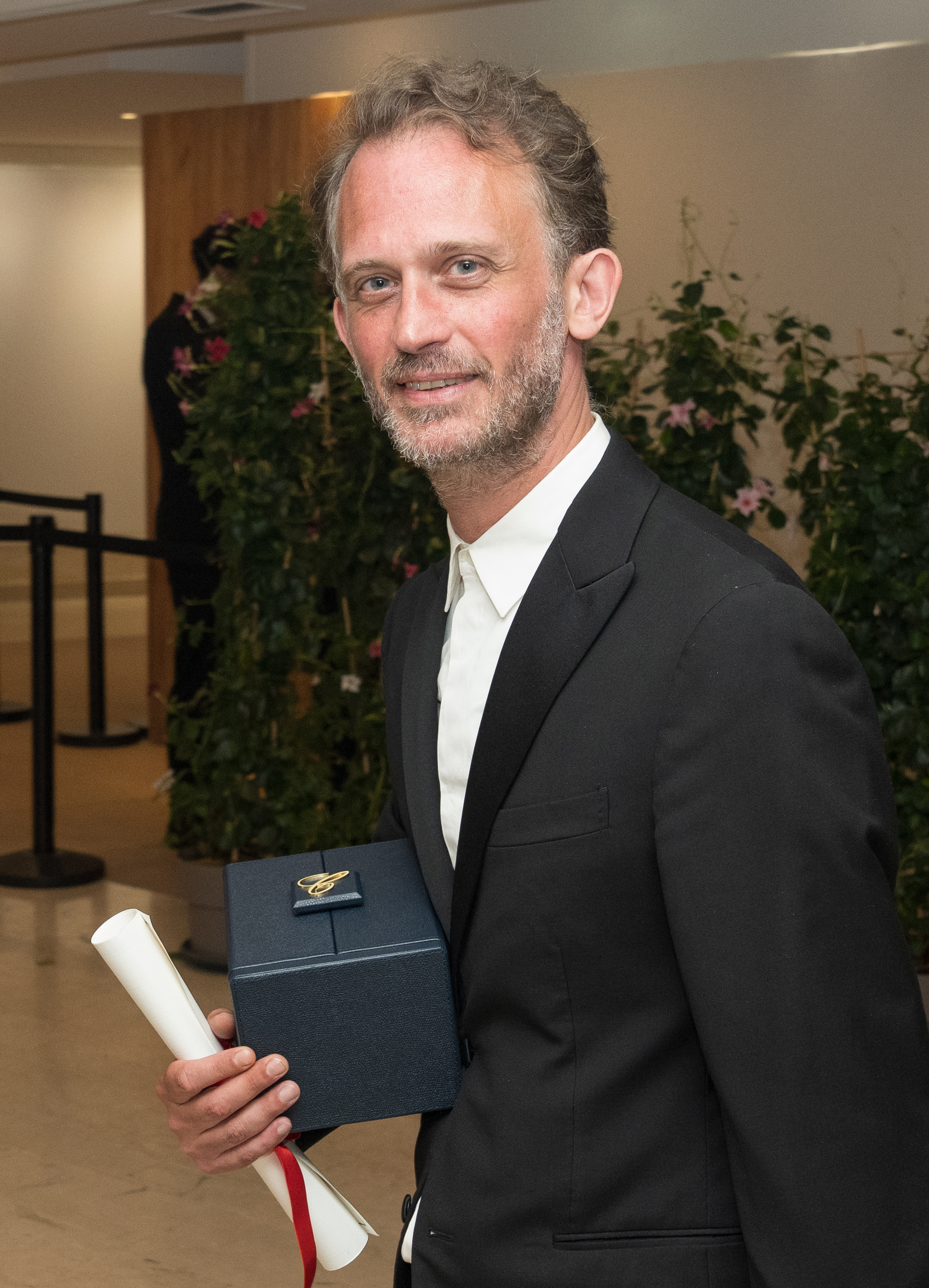
Marre at the awards ceremony of the 2026 Cannes Film Festival

== Release ==
A Man of His Time was selected to compete for the Palme d'Or at the 2026 Cannes Film Festival, where it had its world premiere on 20 May. It will have its North American premiere in the Main Slate of the 2026 New York Film Festival. It was also selected for the 71st Valladolid International Film Festival.

International sales were handled by Paris-based company Charades. The film will be released theatrically in France and Belgium on 30 September 2026, distributed by Condor Distribution in France and Cinéart in Belgium. 1-2 Special acquired the film for the United States, currently planning a theatrical release in 2027.

== Reception ==
=== Critical response ===
On the review aggregator website Rotten Tomatoes, 81% of 27 critics' reviews are positive, with an average rating of 6.4/10. Metacritic, which uses a weighted average, assigned the film a score of 69 out of 100, based on 13 critics, indicating "generally favorable" reviews.

=== Accolades ===
Award	Date of ceremony	Category	Recipient(s)	Result	Ref.
Cannes Film Festival	23 May 2026	Palme d'Or	Emmanuel Marre	Nominated	
Cannes Film Festival	23 May 2026	Best Screenplay	Emmanuel Marre	Won	
Cannes Film Festival	23 May 2026	Prix des Cinémas Art et Essai	Emmanuel Marre	Won	
Cannes Film Festival	23 May 2026	Prix de la Citoyenneté Special Mention	Emmanuel Marre	Won	
Cannes Film Festival	23 May 2026	CST Award for Best Artist-Technician	Nicolas Rumpl	Won	
Rome Film Festival	13 October 2026	Gillo Pontecorvo Award	Emmanuel Marre	Won	
Valladolid International Film Festival	31 October 2026	Best Actor	Swann Arlaud	Won	
Valladolid International Film Festival	31 October 2026	Best Cinematography	Olivier Boonjing	Won	
