= Forever Your Maternal Animal =

2026 film by Valentina Maurel

- International promotional poster
- Spanish: Siempre soy tu animal materno
- Directed by: Valentina Maurel
- Screenplay by: Valentina Maurel
- Produced by: Benoît Roland; Grégoire Debailly
- Starring: Daniela Marín Navarro; Mariangel Villegas; Marina de Tavira; Reinaldo Amién Gutiérrez
- Cinematography: Nicolás Wong
- Edited by: Bertrand Conard
- Production companies: Wrong Men; Geko Films
- Distributed by: Cinéart; JHR Films
- Release date: 16 May 2026 (Cannes)
- Running time: 100 minutes
- Countries: Belgium; France; Mexico
- Language: Spanish

Forever Your Maternal Animal (Spanish: Siempre soy tu animal materno) is a 2026 drama film written and directed by Valentina Maurel. It stars Daniela Marín Navarro, Mariangel Villegas, Marina de Tavira, and Reinaldo Amién Gutiérrez.

The film had its world premiere in the Un Certain Regard section of the 79th Cannes Film Festival on 16 May 2026, where its female ensemble won the section's Best Actress prize.

== Premise ==
After years of living abroad in Europe, Elsa returns to her hometown of San José, Costa Rica, to reconnect with her dysfunctional family.

== Cast ==
- Daniela Marín Navarro as Elsa
- Mariangel Villegas as Amalia
- Marina de Tavira as Isabel
- Reinaldo Amién Gutiérrez as Nahuel

== Production ==
Writer-director Valentina Maurel had previously worked with actors Daniela Marín Navarro and Reinaldo Amien Gutiérrez on her debut feature film, I Have Electric Dreams (2022). Wanting an "experienced actress" to play Elsa's mother, Maurel cast Mexican actress Marina de Tavira.

The film was shot in the Zapote district of San José, Costa Rica, the neighborhood in which Maurel herself was raised. The film received funding from the Wallonia-Brussels Federation Film and Audiovisual Centre.

== Release ==
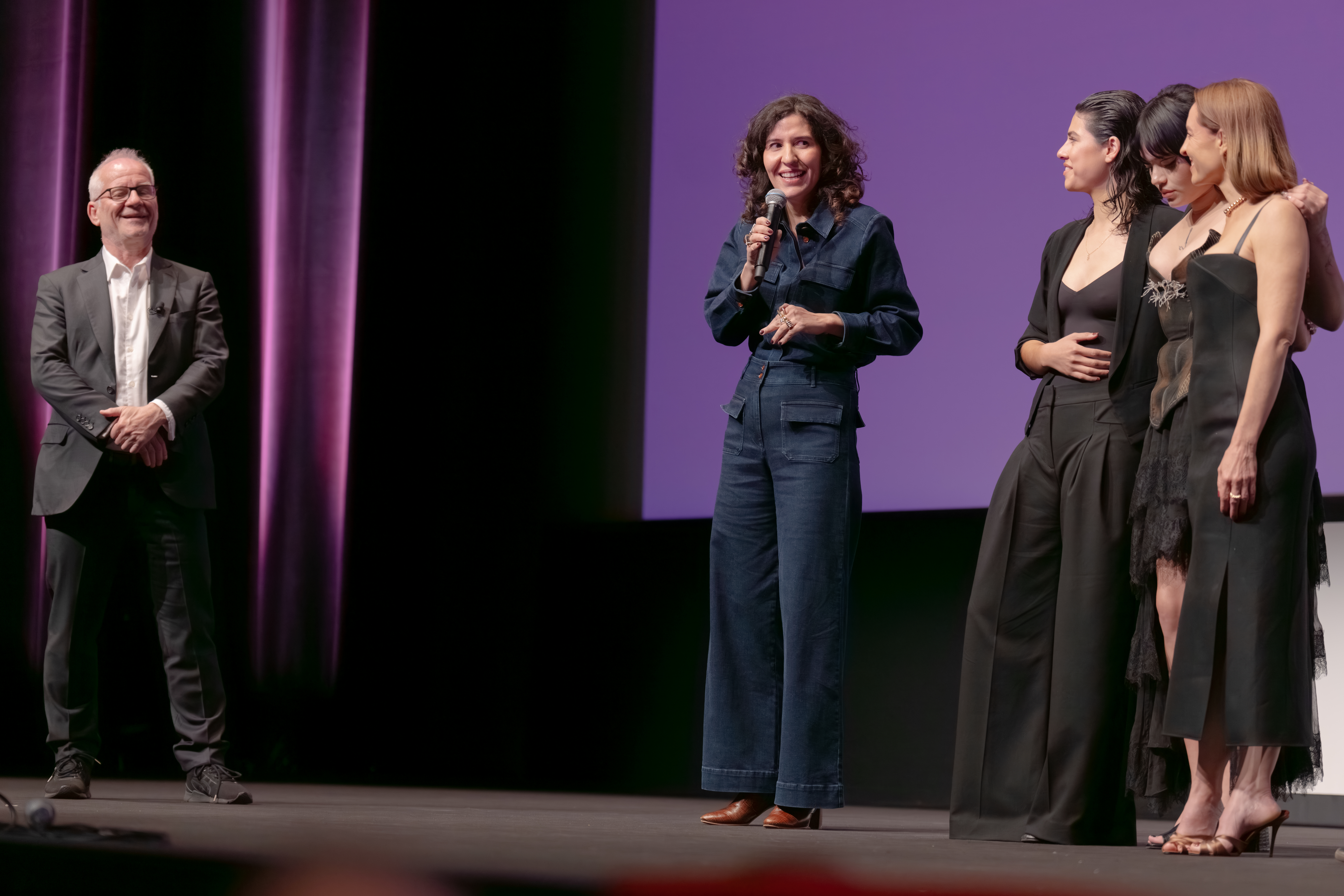
Writer-director Valentina Maurel and the cast of the film at the 2026 Cannes Film Festival

Heretic owns the worldwide sales rights to the film, which was presented at the Marché du Film in May 2026. Cinéart will release the film in the Benelux, while JHR Films will release the film in France.

The film had its world premiere in the Un Certain Regard section of the 79th Cannes Film Festival on 16 May 2026. It was the first film by a Costa Rican filmmaker to make the Cannes Official Selection. Ahead of the film's premiere, a trailer was released on 14 May.

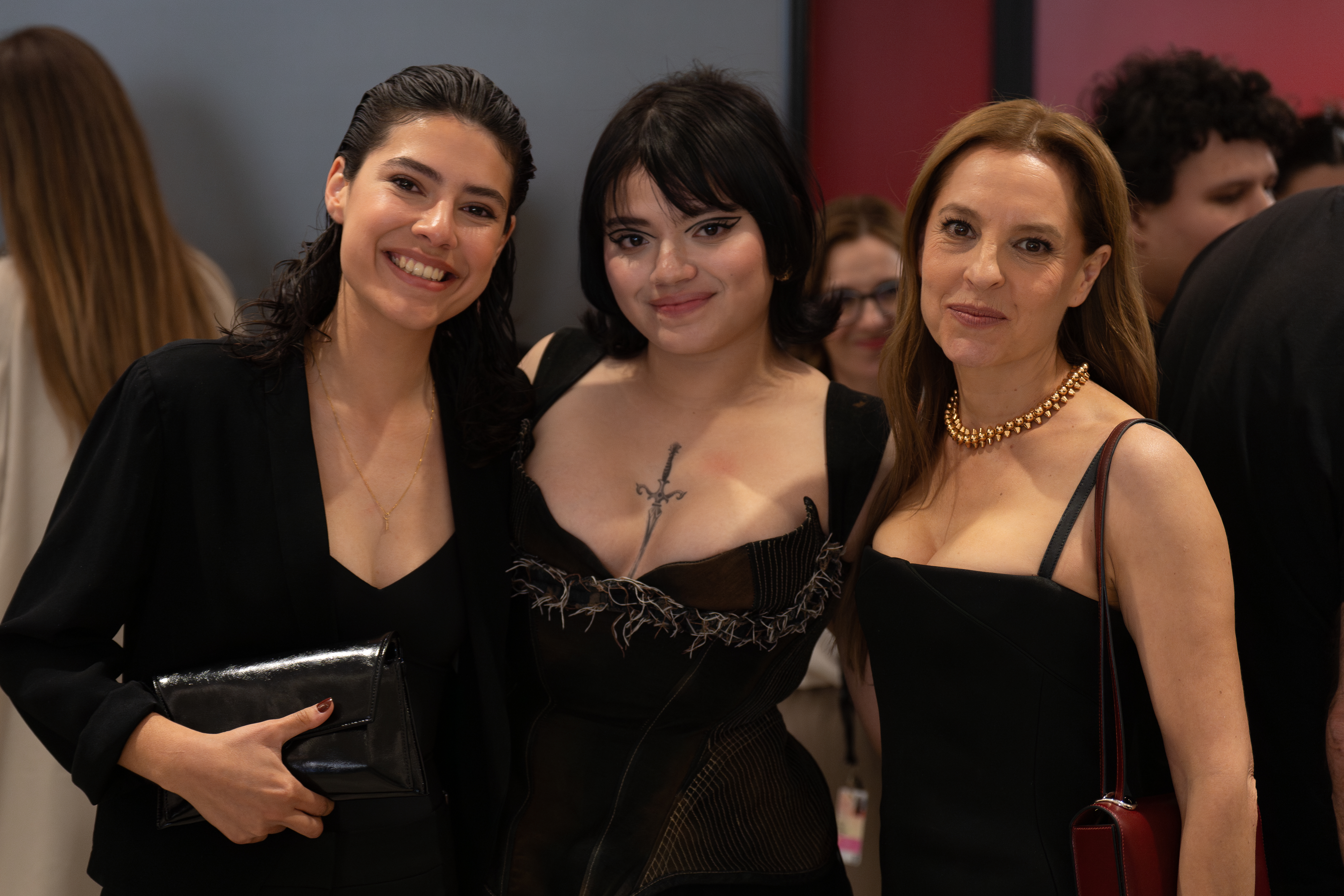
Daniela Marín Navarro, Mariangel Villegas, and Marina de Tavira, Un Certain Regard Best Actress winners

The Centro Costarricense de Cine y Audiovisual chose the film as the Costa Rican submission for Best Ibero-American Film at the 41st Goya Awards.

== Accolades ==
Award	Date of ceremony	Category	Recipient(s)	Result	Ref.
Cannes Film Festival	22 May 2026	Prix Un Certain Regard	Valentina Maurel	Nominated	
Cannes Film Festival	22 May 2026	Un Certain Regard – Best Actress	Marina de Tavira, Daniela Marín Navarro, and Mariangel Villegas	Won	
