= The Dream Is a Snail =

2026 short film by Nguyen Thien An

- Vietnamese: Giấc mơ là ốc sên
- Directed by: Thien An Nguyen
- Written by: Thien An Nguyen; Ly Nguyen
- Produced by: Anderson Le; Bao Nguyen; Thao Quiengg
- Starring: Le Anh Tuan; Nguyen Duc Manh; NSƯT Phi Dieu; Tran Ky Anh
- Cinematography: Chananun Chotrungroj
- Edited by: Tao Do
- Release date: 22 May 2026 (Cannes)
- Running time: 15 minutes
- Countries: Vietnam; South Korea
- Language: Vietnamese

The Dream Is a Snail (Vietnamese: Giấc mơ là ốc sên) is a 2026 short film directed by Nguyen Thien An, and co-written with Ly Nguyen. It stars Le Anh Tuan, Nguyen Duc Manh, Phi Dieu and Tran Ky Anh.

The film had its world premiere at the short film competition of the 2026 Cannes Film Festival on 22 May, where it competed for the Short Film Palme d'Or.. It was the first Vietnamese film to be selected for this category.

In May 2026, East Films and Kontribute announced the development of a feature-length adaptation of the short film-

== Premise ==
An eccentric comedy follows a desperate background actor who finds his calling by offering his body as a snail race host and discovers a world of erotic delights in sensations elicited by his slimy new friends.

== Cast ==
- Le Anh Tuan as The Snail artist
- Nguyen Duc Manh as The Curator
- NSƯT Phi Điểu as The old lady
- Tran Ky Anh as The tomato girl

== Production ==
The Dream Is a Snail was developed by Nguyen Thien An as part of the CJ Short Film Project 2025, a programme supporting emerging filmmakers. The film employs a narrative approach that combines realism with surreal and metaphorical elements, reflecting contemporary psychological and artistic themes.

The production was supported by filmmaker Phan Dang Di, who acted as mentor, and cinematography was handled by Chananun Chotrungroj.

== Release ==
The film premiered at the 79th Cannes Film Festival on 22 May 2026, where it has been selected as one of ten short films in the Short Film Competition, competing for the Short Film Palme d'Or. In September 2026, the film had its North American premiere at the Toronto International Film Festival as part of the Short Cuts program.
