= Viva Carmen =

2026 film by Sébastian Laudenbach

- French: Carmen, l'oiseau rebelle
- Directed by: Sébastien Laudenbach
- Screenplay by: Santiago Otheguy
- Story by: Sébastien Laudenbach
- Based on: Carmen by Georges Bizet
- Produced by: Damien Brunner; Thibaut Ruby; Sarah Delmas; Pierre-Henri Léon
- Starring: Milo Machado-Graner; Camélia Jordana; Soumaye Bocoum; Carl Malapa
- Edited by: Catherine Aladenise
- Music by: Amine Bouhafa; Isabelle Laudenbach
- Production companies: Folivari; France 3 Cinéma; Auvergne-Rhône Alpes Cinema; La Garde Montante Films
- Distributed by: Haut et Court (France)
- Release dates: 18 May 2026 (Cannes); 16 December 2026 (France)
- Running time: 90 minutes
- Countries: France; Finland; Spain
- Language: French

Viva Carmen (French: Carmen, l'oiseau rebelle) is a 2026 animated adventure film directed by Sébastien Laudenbach, written by Santiago Otheguy from an idea by Laudenbach, and loosely based on the opera Carmen by Georges Bizet. A co-production of France, Finland, and Spain, it follows Salvador (Milo Machado-Graner) and his gang of street kids and their attempt to protect Carmen (Camélia Jordana), a Romani young woman.

The film had its world premiere at the Directors' Fortnight section of the 2026 Cannes Film Festival on 18 May. It will be theatrically released in France by Haut et Court on 16 December.

== Plot ==
Salvador, a teenage orphan, apprenticing under a fortune-telling blade sharpener, arrives in his hometown of Seville with his master Antonio. Antonio is hired to sharpen the knife of a soldier, José, but tells him that he was unable to see his fortune. Camping outside the city, Salvador hears a Romani woman named Carmen singing as she bathes. Antonio tells Salvador he foresaw that José will kill Carmen during the next bullfight.

Salvador meets his old friend Belén, a teenage orphan and thief, when he stops her and two younger orphans from robbing Antonio. Antonio sharpens Belén's scissors for her, and predicts that she will lose them in a river. Belén doesn't believe the prophecy, though Salvador attempts to recruit her to intervene in Carmen's fate. Salvador tries to warn Carmen, but she believes José is harmless, and she and José begin to fall in love after José is ordered to arrest her. Salvador, aided by Belén and the other children, free Carmen, which results in José's arrest and demotion. Antonio has taken on a new apprentice while Salvador was busy, telling Salvador that it's the right time for them to part ways.

Carmen visits José while he is confined. Belén steals a fish and, after being pursued by officers, loses her scissors in the river as foretold, and is rescued from the river by Salvador. With her prophecy come true, she and Salvador steal José's knife to prevent the murder, but the younger children sell it to buy food. One night, Carmen leads a group of women in song and dance outside of town. She begins to play her castanets and the gathering is broken up by soldiers. The commanding officer accosts Carmen, demanding a kiss, and José kills the officer with his knife. Carmen rejects him as a murderer, and he flees.

As the bullfight is about to start, Salvador and Belén see José disguised in the crowd. They follow him to his hiding spot, and when he goes to sleep, the teenagers tie him up. Salvador takes the knife, while Belén stays behind to guard José. At the bullfight, Carmen's friends dare her to get the matador's attention, which she does, but José has escaped and saw her. He grabs Carmen and takes her to the docks, where he tells her they can flee to the Americas. Carmen refuses, saying she belongs to no one. Incensed, José attacks her as the teenagers look on, and Carmen kicks him, sending the knife flying. José picks up a nearby object and stabs her with it. The police arrive led by the smaller children as Carmen dies. Later, the police give the four youths the reward that had been offered for the capture of José, which they use to buy a house for themselves and the Romani women.

== Voice cast ==
- Milo Machado-Graner as Salvador
- Camélia Jordana as Carmen
- Paul Minthe as Antonio
- Soumaye Bocoum as Belén
- Carl Malapa as José
- Evan Paturel as La Bola

== Release ==
Viva Carmen premiered at the 2026 Cannes Film Festival in the Directors' Fortnight section.

== Reception ==
=== Critical response ===
Writing for Variety, Guy Lodge described the film as "a veritable triumph of movement, design and, above all, color", remarking on the animation of the film as "immersing viewers in the chaotic bustle and unyielding climate of this scorched city with stark ribbons of ink and those saturated pools of Gauguin-esque color."

Pete Hammond from Deadline characterized the film as "a fairly rousing adventure with enough visual panache to keep any kid from fidgeting in his seat". He noted that despite not being a traditional opera with numerous musical numbers, "Bizet’s score is more subtly suggested in clever orchestrations by composers Amine Bouhafa and Isabelle Laudenbach".
