= Katharina Rivilis =

German filmmaker

Katharina Rivilis is a German actress and filmmaker.

== Early life and education ==
Rivilis performed in plays as a child, and was an exchange student in Las Cruces, New Mexico in 2001. She completed acting studies at Konrad Wolf Film University of Babelsberg in 2007, and began to study directing at Deutsche Film- und Fernsehakademie Berlin in 2012.

== Career ==
Rivilis' 2026 film I’ll Be Gone in June debuted in the Un Certain Regard portion of that year's Cannes Film Festival.

== Filmography ==
=== As director ===
Year	Title	Notes	Ref.
2011	Ápnoia	Short film	
2012	The Girl with the Red Hair	Short film	
2013	Offstage	Documentary short	
2013	Remote Control	Short film	
2014	Joel & Jeanne	Short film	
2015	Ariana Forever!	Short film	
2017	Elia	Short film	
2019	Day X	Short film	
2020	Rondo	Short film	
2026	I'll Be Gone in June	—N/a	
