= 2026 Cannes Film Festival =

79th Cannes Film Festival

- Official poster designed by Hartland Villa featuring Susan Sarandon and Geena Davis on the set of Thelma & Louise (1991)
- Opening film: The Electric Kiss
- Location: Cannes, France
- Founded: 1946
- Awards: Palme d'Or: Fjord
- Hosted by: Eye Haïdara
- Artistic director: Thierry Frémaux
- No. of films: 22 (In Competition)
- Festival date: 12–23 May 2026
- Website: festival-cannes.com/en/

Cannes Film Festival
- 2027 2025

The 79th annual Cannes Film Festival took place from 12 to 23 May 2026. South Korean filmmaker Park Chan-wook served as jury president for the main competition. Romanian filmmaker Cristian Mungiu won the Palme d'Or for a second time with the drama film Fjord.

Hartland Villa designed the official poster for the festival featuring actresses Geena Davis and Susan Sarandon on the set of Thelma & Louise (1991) by Ridley Scott, the closing film of the 44th edition. French actress Eye Haïdara served as host for the opening and closing ceremonies.

During the festival, three Honorary Palmes d'Or were awarded: the first was to Peter Jackson during the festival's opening ceremony, the second was awarded on short notice to John Travolta before the world premiere of Propeller One-Way Night Coach, the third was awarded to Barbra Streisand during the closing ceremony.

The festival opened with the French period-comedy film The Electric Kiss by Pierre Salvadori.

== Juries ==
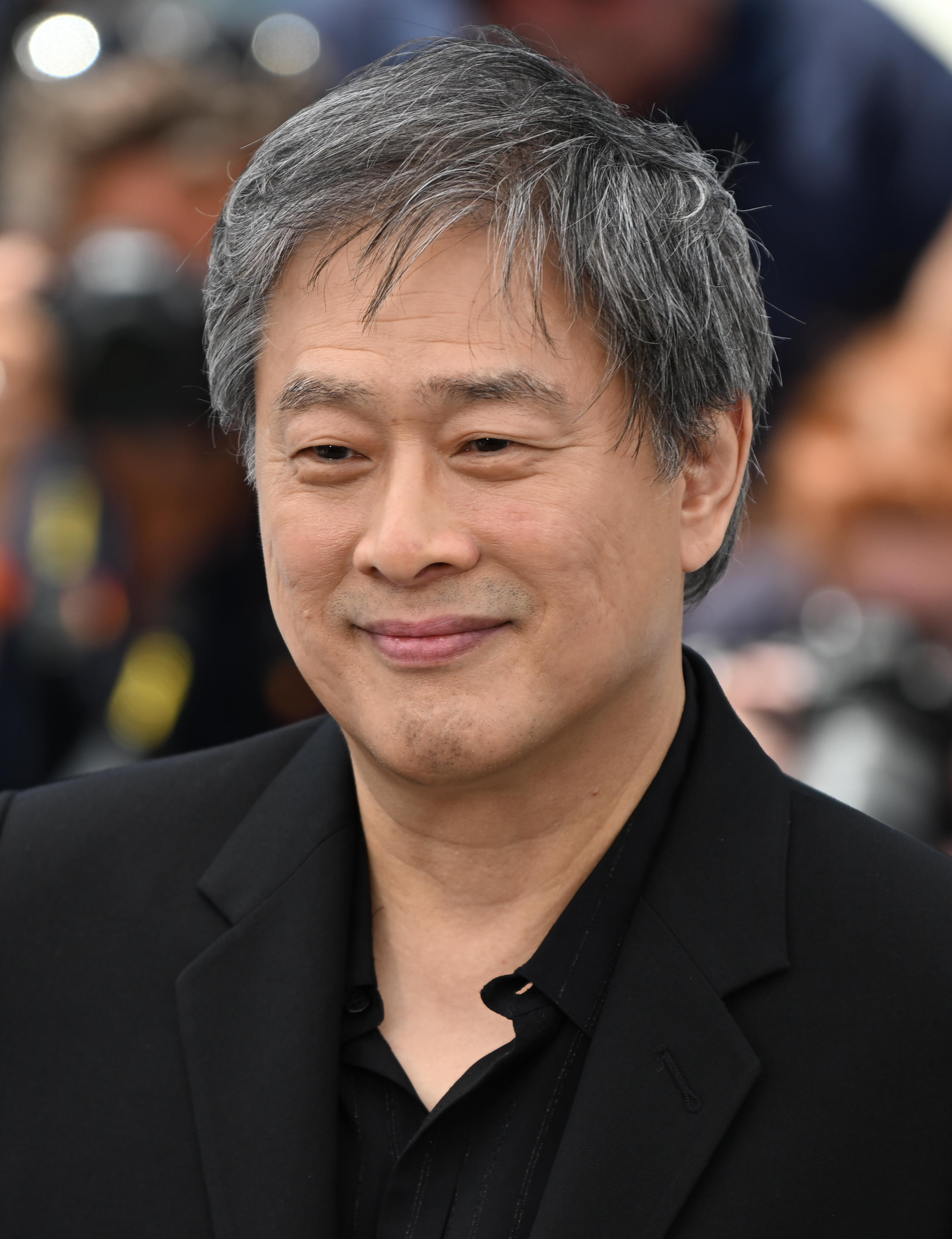
Park Chan-wook, Main Competition jury president

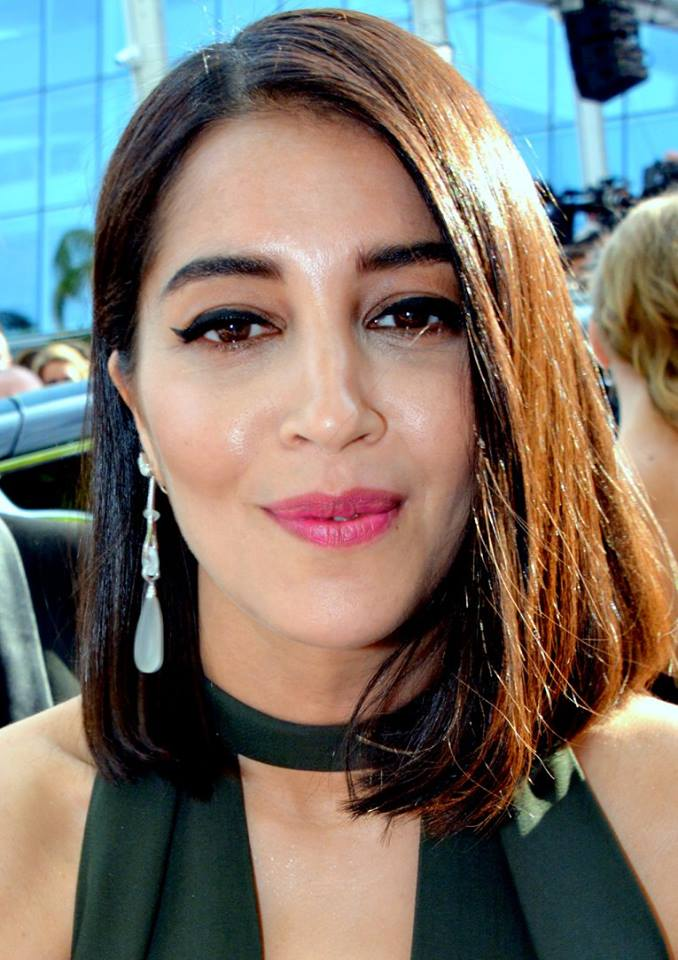
Leïla Bekhti, Un Certain Regard jury president

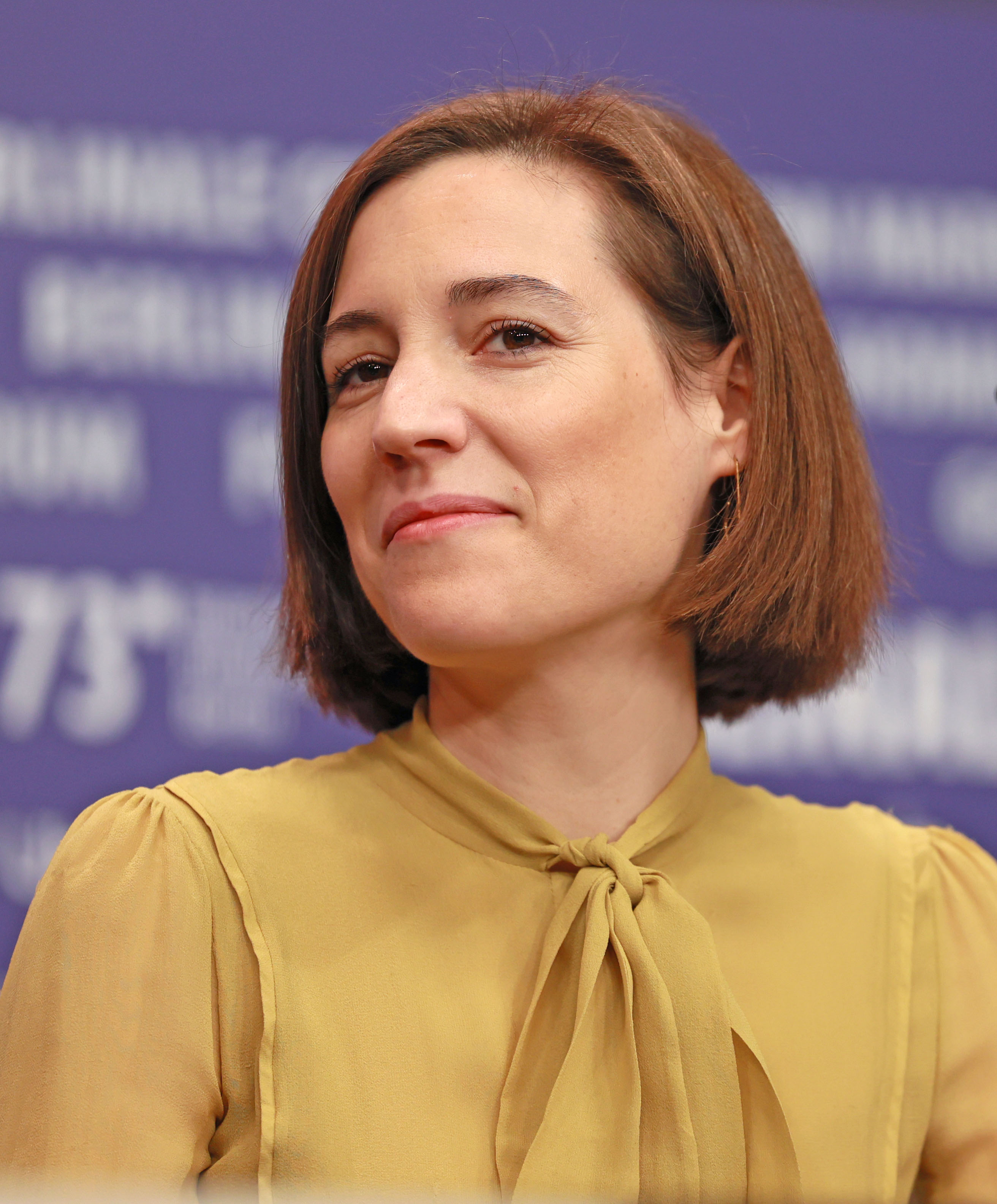
Carla Simón, Cinéfondation and Short Films Competition jury president

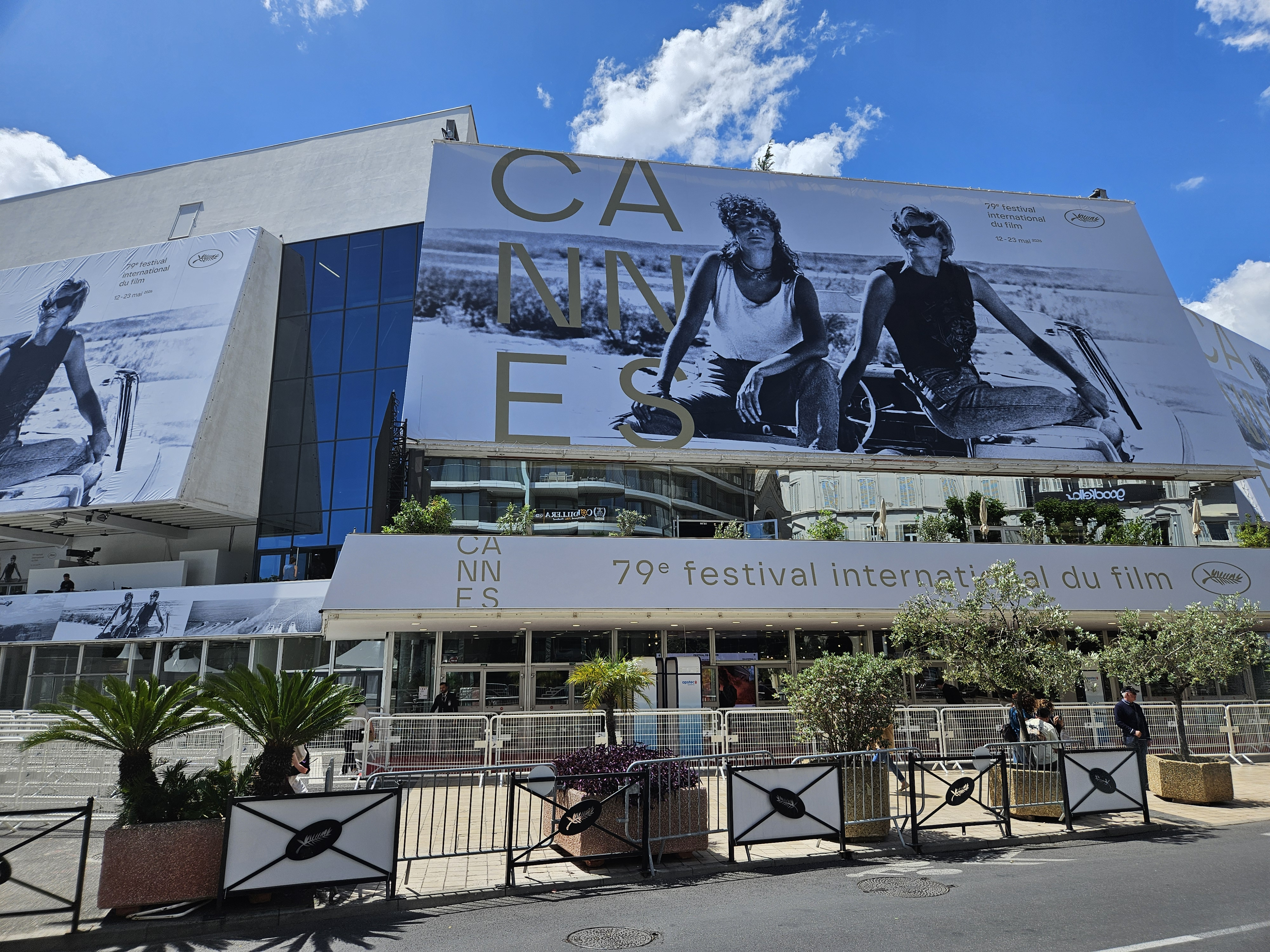
Grand Auditorium Louis Lumière (Théâtre Lumière) facade

=== Main Competition ===
- Park Chan-wook, South Korean filmmaker — Jury President
- Diego Céspedes, Chilean filmmaker
- Isaach de Bankolé, Ivorian actor
- Paul Laverty, Irish-Scottish screenwriter
- Demi Moore, American actress
- Ruth Negga, Irish-Ethiopian actress
- Stellan Skarsgård, Swedish actor
- Laura Wandel, Belgian filmmaker
- Chloé Zhao, Chinese filmmaker

=== Un Certain Regard ===
- Leïla Bekhti, French actress — Jury President
- Angèle Diabang Brener, Senegalese producer and filmmaker
- Khaled Mouzanar, Lebanese composer and producer
- Laura Samani, Italian filmmaker
- Thomas Cailley, French filmmaker

=== Cinéfondation and Short Films Competition ===
- Carla Simón, Spanish filmmaker — Jury President
- Park Ji-min, French actress and visual artist
- Ali Asgari, Iranian filmmaker and producer
- Salim Kechiouche, French actor
- Magnus von Horn, Swedish filmmaker

=== Caméra d'Or ===
- Monia Chokri, Canadian actress and filmmaker — Jury President
- Michel Benjamin, French cinematographer
- Cédric Coppola, French film critic
- Marine Francen, French filmmaker
- Christophe Massie, French Deputy CEO of Eclair Preservation by Netgem Group

=== Immersive Competition ===
- Blanca Li, Spanish dancer, actress and immersive director — Jury President
- Céline Tricart, French immersive director and producer
- Michel van der Aa, Dutch composer and multimedia artist
- Mary Matheson, British immersive director and producer
- Hsin-Chien Huang, Taiwanese artist and immersive director

=== L'Œil d'Or ===
- Mstyslav Chernov, Ukrainian photojournalist and filmmaker — Jury President
- Tabitha Jackson, English director of the Film Forum NYC
- Géraldine Pailhas, French actress
- Lina Soualem, Franco-Palestine filmmaker and actress
- Victor Castanet, French journalist

=== Critics' Week ===
- Payal Kapadia, Indian filmmaker — Jury President
- Ama Ampadu, Ghanaian-British producer
- Donsaron Kovitvanitcha, Thai film critic, journalist and director of the Bangkok International Film Festival
- Oklou, French singer
- Théodore Pellerin, Canadian actor

=== Queer Palm ===
- Anna Mouglalis, French actress and musician — Jury Co-president
- Thomas Jolly, French actor, artistic director and stage director — Jury Co-president
- Raya Martigny, Réunion multidisciplinary artist and actress
- Jehnny Beth, French actress and singer
- André Fischer, Brazilian founder and director of the MixBrasil Festival

== Official Selection ==
The Official Selection for the 79th edition was announced on 9 April 2026, by the festival's President Iris Knobloch and General Delegate/Artistic Director Thierry Frémaux at a press conference held at the Pathé Palace in Paris. Frémaux noted that 2,541 feature films were submitted for consideration, with the initial main competition lineup featuring 21 films from three continents and five female directors. Pedro Almodóvar's Bitter Christmas is the only selected film that had its world premiere before the festival. At the press conference after the announcement, Frémaux stated that he hoped to add James Gray's Paper Tiger to the lineup at a later stage; the film's premiere at the festival was confirmed later that month.

=== In Competition ===
The following films were selected to compete for the Palme d'Or:

English Title	Original Title	Director(s)	Production Country
All of a Sudden	Soudain / 急に具合が悪くなる	Ryusuke Hamaguchi	France, Japan, Germany, Belgium
Another Day (QP)	Garance	Jeanne Herry	France
The Beloved	El ser querido	Rodrigo Sorogoyen	Spain, France
The Birthday Party	Histoires de la Nuit	Léa Mysius	France
Bitter Christmas (QP)	Amarga Navidad	Pedro Almodóvar	Spain
La bola negra (QP)		Javier Calvo and Javier Ambrossi	Spain, France
Coward (QP)		Lukas Dhont	Belgium, France, Netherlands
The Dreamed Adventure	Das Geträumte Abenteuer	Valeska Grisebach	Germany, France, Austria, Bulgaria
Fatherland	Vaterland	Paweł Pawlikowski	Poland, France, Italy, Germany
Fjord		Cristian Mungiu	Romania, Norway, Denmark, Finland, France, Sweden
Gentle Monster		Marie Kreutzer	Austria, France, Germany
Hope	호프	Na Hong-jin	South Korea
The Man I Love (QP)		Ira Sachs	United States, France
A Man of His Time	Notre Salut	Emmanuel Marre	Belgium, France
Minotaur	Минотавр	Andrey Zvyagintsev	France, Latvia, Germany
Moulin		László Nemes	France
Nagi Notes (QP)	ナギダイアリー	Koji Fukada	Japan, Singapore, Philippines, Thailand, France
Paper Tiger		James Gray	United States, Brazil
Parallel Tales	Histoires Parallèles	Asghar Farhadi	France, United States, Italy, Belgium
Sheep in the Box	箱の中の羊	Hirokazu Kore-eda	Japan
The Unknown	L'Inconnue	Arthur Harari	France, Italy
A Woman's Life (QP)	La Vie d'une Femme	Charline Bourgeois-Tacquet	France, Belgium

(QP) indicates film in competition for the Queer Palm.

=== Out of Competition ===
The following films were selected to be screened out of competition:

English Title	Original Title	Director(s)	Production Country
Crescendo	L'Objet du Délit	Agnès Jaoui	France, Belgium
De Gaulle: Résistance	La Bataille de Gaulle: L'Âge de Fer	Antonin Baudry	France, Belgium
Diamond		Andy Garcia	United States
Forsaken	L'Abandon	Vincent Garenq	France
Her Private Hell		Nicolas Winding Refn	Denmark, United States
The Electric Kiss (opening film)	Venus Electrificata	Pierre Salvadori	France, Belgium
Karma		Guillaume Canet	France
Midnight Screenings
Colony	군체	Yeon Sang-ho	South Korea
The Fast and the Furious (2001)		Rob Cohen	United States
Full Phil		Quentin Dupieux	France
Jim Queen (CdO) (QP)	Jim Queen à la Recherche de la Chloroqueer	Nicolas Athané and Marco Nguyen	France, Belgium
Roma Elastica (QP)		Bertrand Mandico	France, Italy
Species (CdO)	Sanguine	Marion Le Coroller	France

(CdO) indicates film eligible for the Caméra d'Or as a feature directorial debut.
(QP) indicates film in competition for the Queer Palm.

=== Un Certain Regard ===
Jane Schoenbrun's slasher film Teenage Sex and Death at Camp Miasma was the section's opening film on 13 May. Laetitia Masson's comedy-drama film Ulysse was the section's closing film. The following films were selected to compete in the Un Certain Regard section:

English Title	Original Title	Director(s)	Production Country
All the Lovers in the Night	すべて真夜中の恋人たち	Yukiko Sode	Japan, France
Ben'Imana (CdO)		Marie Clémentine Dusabejambo	Rwanda, Gabon, France, Norway, Ivory Coast
Club Kid (CdO) (QP)		Jordan Firstman	United States
Congo Boy		Rafiki Fariala	Central African Republic, France, Democratic Republic of the Congo, Italy
Elephants in the Fog (CdO) (QP)	तिनीहरू	Abinash Bikram Shah	Nepal, France, Germany, Brazil, Norway
Everytime		Sandra Wollner	Austria, Germany
Forever Your Maternal Animal	Siempre soy tu animal materno	Valentina Maurel	Costa Rica, Belgium, France, Mexico
A Girl's Story	Mémoire de Fille	Judith Godrèche	France
I'll Be Gone in June (CdO)		Katharina Rivilis	Germany, Switzerland, United States
Iron Boy	Le Corset	Louis Clichy	France, Belgium
The Meltdown	El deshielo	Manuela Martelli	Chile, United States, Spain, Mexico
Strawberries	La más dulce	Laïla Marrakchi	France, Morocco, Spain, Belgium
Teenage Sex and Death at Camp Miasma (opening film) (QP)		Jane Schoenbrun	United States
Titanic Ocean (CdO)		Konstantina Kotzamani	Greece, Germany, Romania, France, Spain
Ulya	Uļa	Viestur Kairish	Latvia, Poland, Estonia, Lithuania
Victorian Psycho		Zachary Wigon	United Kingdom, Ireland
Words of Love	Quelques Mots d'Amour	Rudi Rosenberg	France
Yesterday the Eye Didn't Sleep (CdO)	البارح العين ما نامت	Rakan Mayasi	Belgium, Lebanon, Palestine, Qatar, Saudi Arabia
Out of Competition
Ulysse (closing film)		Laetitia Masson	France

(CdO) indicates film eligible for the Caméra d'Or as a feature directorial debut.
(QP) indicates film in competition for the Queer Palm.

=== Cannes Premiere ===
The following films were selected to be screened in the Cannes Premiere section:

English Title	Original Title	Director(s)	Production Country
Aquí		Tiago Guedes	Portugal, France
The End of It (CdO)		Maria Martínez Bayona	United Kingdom, Norway, Spain
The Samurai and the Prisoner	黒牢城	Kiyoshi Kurosawa	Japan
Mary Magdalene (QP)	Marie Madeleine	Gessica Généus	Haiti, France, Belgium, Luxembourg, Canada
The Match (ŒdO)	El partido	Juan Cabral and Santiago Franco	Argentina
Orange-Flavoured Wedding	Mariage au goût d'orange	Christophe Honoré	France
Propeller One-Way Night Coach		John Travolta	United States
Think Good	Si Tu Penses Bien	Géraldine Nakache	France, Belgium
When the Night Falls	La Troisième Nuit	Daniel Auteuil	France
Visitation	Heimsuchung	Volker Schlöndorff	Germany

(CdO) indicates film eligible for the Caméra d'Or as a feature directorial debut.
(ŒdO) indicates film eligible for the L'Œil d'or as documentary.
(QP) indicates film in competition for the Queer Palm.

=== Special Screenings ===
The following films were selected to be screened in the Special Screenings section:

English Title	Original Title	Director(s)	Production Country
Ashes	Ceniza en la boca	Diego Luna	Mexico, Spain
Avedon (ŒdO)		Ron Howard	United States
Cantona (ŒdO)		David Tryhorn and Ben Nicholas	United Kingdom
Che Guevara: The Last Companions (ŒdO)	Les Survivants du Che	Christophe Réveille	France
Golden Triangle (CdO)	Le Triangle d'Or	Hélène Rosselet-Ruiz	France, Belgium, Canada
Groundswell (ŒdO)		Josh Tickell and Rebecca Harrell Tickell	United States, Colombia, Kenya, India, Brazil
John Lennon: The Last Interview (ŒdO)		Steven Soderbergh	United States
Marvelous Mornings (CdO) (QP)	Les Matins Merveilleux	Avril Besson	France
Molière, Cyrano and the Young King	Les Caprices de l'Enfant Roi	Michel Leclerc	France
Rehearsals for a Revolution (ŒdO)	خاطرات ایران	Pegah Ahangarani	Iran, Czech Republic, Spain
Spring (CdO)	Vesna	Rostislav Kirpičenko	Lithuania, Ukraine, France
Tangles (CdO) (QP)		Leah Nelson	Canada, United States
Women on Trial	L'Affaire Marie-Claire	Lauriane Escaffre and Yvo Muller	France
Family Screening
Lucy Lost (CdO)	Le mystère Lucy Lost	Olivier Clert	France

(CdO) indicates film eligible for the Caméra d'Or as a feature directorial debut.
(ŒdO) indicates film eligible for the L'Œil d'or as documentary.
(QP) indicates film in competition for the Queer Palm.

=== Short Films Competition ===
Selected from 3,184 productions, the following 10 short films were selected to compete for the Short Film Palme d'Or:

English Title	Original Title	Director(s)	Production Country
A Few Things Happening by a River	Algumas coisas que acontecem ao lado de um rio	Daniel Soares	Portugal, France
The Dream Is a Snail	Giấc mơ là ốc sên	Nguyễn Thiên Ân	Vietnam, South Korea, Australia
The End		Niki Lindroth von Bahr	Sweden, France, Denmark
For the Opponents	Para los contrincantes	Federico Luis	Mexico, Chile, France
Fresh Cut	Nouvel Hair	Hadrien Bels	France
The Last Spring	Dernier Printemps	Mathilde Bédouet	France
Nobody Said Anything	Niko ništa nije rekao	Tamara Todorović	Serbia, France, Slovenia, Croatia
Sisters' Swim	Le bain des sirènes	Lola Degove	France, Belgium
Spiritus Sanctus		Michał Toczek	Poland
Thunder Platoon	Pelotón Trueno	Theo Montoya	Colombia, France

=== Cinéfondation ===
For its 29th edition Cinéfondation (or La Cinéf) has selected 14 live-action and 5 animated shorts from among the 2,750 films sent by film schools all over the world. Directed by 12 women and 9 men, they represent fifteen countries and four continents. Two of the schools are invited for the first time: Hongik University (South Korea) and ISAMM (Tunisia). The festival allocates a €15,000 grant for the winner of the First Prize, €11,250 for the winner of the Second Prize and €7,500 for the winner of the Third Prize. The following films were selected for the La Cinéf competition:

English Title	Original Title	Director(s)	School
28 Days Left	TJ28	Yasmin Najjar	Aalto University, Finland
Always Wanted to Be God, Never Wanted to Be Good		Noa Epars and Marvin Merkel	Geneva University of Art and Design, Switzerland
Axles	Trakcje	Jakub Krzyszpin	Łódź Film School, Poland
Bird Rhapsody	새의 랩소디	Choi Won-jung	Hongik University, South Korea
Growing Stones, Flying Papers		Roozbeh Gezerseh and Soraya Shamsi	Konrad Wolf Film University of Babelsberg, Germany
Laser-Cat	Laser-Gato	Lucas Acher	NYU, United States
Left Behind, Still Standing		Vida Skerk	National Film and Television School, United Kingdom
Me, You and the Cow	Tú, yo y la vaca	Aina Callejón	Cinema and Audiovisual School of Catalonia, Spain
Never Enough	Aldrig Nok	Julius Lagoutte Larsen	La Fémis, France
Our Secrets	天天的秘密	Lenti Liang	USC School of Cinematic Arts, United States
Over the Threshold	Preko Praga	Tara Gajović	FDU, Serbia
Pickled		Fanny Capu	National Film and Television School, United Kingdom
Photograph of an Insane Woman to Show the Condition of Her Hair		Arwen Aznag	LUCA School of Arts, Belgium
Silent Voices (QP)		Nadine Misong Jin	Columbia University, United States
Shadows of the Moonless Nights	ਪਰਛਾਵੇਂ ਮੱਸਿਆ ਰਾਤਾਂ ਦੇ	Mehar Malhotra	Film and Television Institute of India, India
Somewhere I Belong	إرث	Youssef Handouse	ISAMM, Tunisia
Sunday's Children		Reuben Hamlyn	NYU, United States
Where Fireflies Sparkle	Onde Nascem os Pirilampos	Clara Vieira	Lisbon Theatre and Film School, Portugal
Will It Rain Again Today	まだ雨降るかな	Wong Chau-Hong	Nihon University, Japan

(QP) indicates film in competition for the Queer Palm.

=== Cannes Classics ===
Guillermo del Toro's Pan's Labyrinth (2006) was the pre-opening screening of the festival on 12 May at the Debussy Theater, the new 4K restored print from its original negatives celebrates the 20th anniversary of the film's world premiere at the 2006 edition of the festival.

The line-up also includes new 4K restorations from past Palme d'Or winners: Man of Iron (1981) and Farewell My Concubine (1993). Alongside the restoration of five silent short films by Soviet-Armenian filmmaker Artavazd Peleshyan, titled "Peleshyan Project". The following films were selected to be screened:

English Title	Original Title	Director(s)	Production Country
Restored Prints
Amma Ariyan (1986)	അമ്മ അറിയാന്‍	John Abraham	India
Days of Hope (1938-1945)	Espoir: Sierra de Teruel	Boris Peskine and André Malraux	Spain, France
The Devils (1971)		Ken Russell	United Kingdom, United States
The Drift (1962)	La Dérive	Paula Delsol	France
The Dull Ice Flower (1989)	魯冰花	Yang Li-Kuo	Taiwan
Eva (1953)	Εύα	Maria Plyta	Greece
Farewell My Concubine (1993)	霸王別姬	Chen Kaige	China, Hong Kong
The Fast and the Furious (2001)		Rob Cohen	United States
Festival de Cannes 1947 (1947)		Adrien Fred Maury	France
The House of the Angel (1957)	La casa del ángel	Leopoldo Torre Nilsson	Argentina
The Innocent (1976)	L'innocente	Luchino Visconti	Italy, France
Love Circle (1969)	Metti, una sera a cena	Giuseppe Patroni Griffi	Italy
Machine-Gun Kelly (1958)		Roger Corman	United States
Man of Iron (1981)	Człowiek z żelaza	Andrzej Wajda	Poland
Moonlighting (1982)		Jerzy Skolimowski	United Kingdom
Pan's Labyrinth (2006) (opening film)	El laberinto del fauno	Guillermo del Toro	Spain, Mexico
Pastoral Symphony (1946)	La Symphonie pastorale	Jean Delannoy	France
Sanshiro Sugata (1943)	姿三四郎	Akira Kurosawa	Japan
Seagulls Die in the Harbour (1955)	Meeuwen sterven in de haven	Rik Kuypers, Ivo Michiels and Roland Verhavert	Belgium
The Stranger (1946)		Orson Welles	United States
Tilaï (1990)		Idrissa Ouédraogo	Burkina Faso, Switzerland, France, West Germany, United Kingdom
Two Women (1960)	La ciociara	Vittorio De Sica	Italy, France
Peleshyan Project
Beginning (1967)	Սկիզբը	Artavazd Peleshyan	Soviet Union
Inhabitants (1970)	Բնիկներ	Artavazd Peleshyan	Soviet Union
The Land of the People (1966)	Մարդկանց երկիրը	Artavazd Peleshyan	Soviet Union
Seasons of the Year (1975)	Տարվա եղանակները	Artavazd Peleshyan	Soviet Union
We (1969)	Մենք	Artavazd Peleshyan	Soviet Union
Special Screenings
The Golden Age (CdO) (QP)	L'Âge d'Or	Bérenger Thouin	France, Italy
A Life, A Manifesto (ŒdO)	Une Vie Manifeste	Jean-Gabriel Périot	France
Special Screenings - Short Films
Goodnight Lamby		Dustin Yellin	United States
Playground	Zamine Bazi	Amirhossein Shojaei	Iran, France
Torino Shadow	都灵之影	Jia Zhangke	Italy, China
Documentaries about Cinema
Dernsie: The Amazing Life of Bruce Dern (ŒdO)		Mike Mendez	United States
Maverick: The Epic Adventures of David Lean (ŒdO)		Barnaby Thompson	United Kingdom, United States
My Coluche (ŒdO)	Mon Coluche a Moi	Michel Denisot, Camille Bruere and Julie Lazare	France
Nostalgia for the Future (ŒdO)		Brecht Debackere	Belgium
The Story of Documentary Film (The 1970s) (ŒdO)		Mark Cousins	United Kingdom
Vittorio De Sica – La Vie in scene (ŒdO)	Vittorio De Sica – La Vita in scena	Francesco Zippel	Italy

(CdO) indicates film eligible for the Caméra d'Or as a feature directorial debut.
(ŒdO) indicates film eligible for the L'Œil d'or as documentary.
(QP) indicates film in competition for the Queer Palm.

=== Cinéma de la Plage ===
The only ticket free section of the festival is held at the Cannes' Plage Macé, the line-up usually includes classic films, commemorations, and world premieres of new productions. This year line-up includes screenings from past Palme d'Or winners: The Birds, the Bees and the Italians (1966) and A Man and a Woman (1966).

The following films were selected to be screened:

English Title	Original Title	Director(s)	Production Country
The Birds, the Bees and the Italians (1966)	Signore & Signori	Pietro Germi	Italy, France
Molière, Cyrano and the Young King	Les Caprices de l'Enfant Roi	Michel Leclerc	France
Top Gun (1986)		Tony Scott	United States
Viva Maria! (1965)		Louis Malle	France, Italy
Restored prints
All the President's Men (1976)		Alan J. Pakula	United States
The Bullet Train (1975)	新幹線大爆破	Junya Sato	Japan
Cría Cuervos (1976)		Carlos Saura	Spain
I Hate Actors (1986)	Je hais les acteurs	Gérard Krawczyk	France
Land and Freedom (1995)		Ken Loach	United Kingdom, Spain, Germany, Italy, France
A Man and a Woman (1966)	Un homme et une femme	Claude Lelouch	France
Mon Oncle (1958)		Jacques Tati	France, Italy

=== Immersive Competition ===
For the 3rd Immersive Competition, nine immersive works from eight countries were selected for the competition. The productions were screened at the Carlton Hotel from 12 to 22 May 2026. This year, the section featured a new technical setup enabling collective experiences for up to 200 participants.

The following immersive films were selected to be screened:

English Title	Original Title	Director(s)	Production Country
The Black Mirror Experience		David Bardos and Damià Ferràndiz	France, Spain
Gawd v. the People		Yamil Rodriguez, Ivan Alejandro Diaz Cardenas and Stephen Henderson	United Kingdom
Katábasis		Ugo Arsac	France
Lúcido		Vier	Portugal
The Pirate Queen: No Safe Waters		Eloise Singer	United Kingdom
Playing with Fire		Pierre-Alain Giraud	United Kingdom, France, Taiwan
Red Planet 3009		Mariano Leotta and Francesco Fiore	Italy
Voooooo---Peeeeee---		Hyeunjoo Woo and Jiyun Park	South Korea
Yellowfin		E del Mundo	Philippines

== Parallel sections ==
=== Critics' Week (Semaine de la critique) ===
The Critics' Week is a parallel selection dedicated to first and second films, the selection for its 65th edition was announced on 13 April 2026, by artistic director Ava Cahen. From a record 1,050 feature film submissions, 11 were selected, including nine first features eligible for the Caméra d'Or. According to Cahen, the selection focuses on "emerging filmmakers whose visions offer hope amidst a society in flux". For the first time in the section's history, the opening film was an animated feature: In Waves by Phuong Mai Nguyen. The closing film was the drama Adieu Monde Cruel by Félix de Givry. The section also held its first edition of Next Step Studio, an initiative to highlight local cinema, pairing eight emerging directors to co-direct and co-write four short films. Indonesia was the first edition's focus country.

The following films were selected to be screened:

English Title	Original Title	Director(s)	Production Country
In Competition
Alive (CdO)	Viva	Aina Clotet	Spain
Dua		Blerta Basholli	Kosovo, Switzerland, France
A Girl Unknown (CdO)	无名女孩	Zou Jing	China, France
La Gradiva (CdO) (QP)		Marine Atlan	France, Italy
Six Months in a Pink and Blue Building (CdO) (QP)	Seis Meses en el Edificio Rosa con Azul	Bruno Santamaría Razo	Mexico, Brazil, Denmark
The Station (CdO)	المحطّة	Sara Ishaq	Yemen, Jordan, France, Germany, Netherlands, Norway, Qatar
Tin Castle (ŒdO)		Alexander Murphy	Ireland, France
Special Screenings
Flesh and Fuel (CdO) (QP)	Du Fioul dans les artères	Pierre Le Gall	France, Poland
Goodbye Cruel World (CdO) (closing film)	Adieu Monde Cruel	Félix de Givry	France, Belgium
In Waves (CdO) (opening film)		Phuong Mai Nguyen	France, Belgium
Stonewall (CdO)	La Frappe	Julien Gaspar-Oliveri	France
Short Films Competition
Adgwa-Ata (QP)		Zsuzsanna Kreif	Hungary, France
City of Owls		Zhenia Kazankina	France, Germany, Italy
Class Photo	Klasės Nuotrauka	Arnas Balčiūnas	Lithuania
Man'mi		Aude N'Guessan Forget	France
Nafron	نفرون	Daood Alabdulaa	Syria, Germany
Skinny Boots	Skinny Bottines	Romain F. Dubois	Canada
"Vaterland" or a Bule Named Yanto	„Vaterland“ oder Ein Bule Namens Yanto	Berthold Wahjudi	Germany, Indonesia
Visit into Irradiated Land	Visite en terre irradiée	Anne-Sophie Girault	France
What Do the Maknines Dream Of	À quoi rêvent les Maknines	Sarra Ryma	Algeria, France
What Do You Seek in the Dark? (QP)	หาอะไร?	Tossaphon Riantong	Thailand
Special Screenings - Short Films
I Think You Should Be Here		Anna-Marija Adomaitytė, Élie Grappe	Switzerland, France
Love Story		Laïs Decaster	France
The Sentinel (QP)	La Sentinelle	Ali Cherri	France, Lebanon
Morelia Film Festival at Cannes - Short Films
At the Edge of the Volcano	Al borde del volcán	Jorge Granados Ross	Mexico
Casa chica		Lau Charles	Mexico
The Immaculate Honey	La miel inmaculada	Mauricio Calderón Rico	Mexico
Una parvada de estruendo		Mariana Mendivil	Mexico
Next Step Studio - Short Films
Annisa		Reza Rahadian, Sam Manacsa	Indonesia, France
Holy Crowd		Reza Fahriyansyah, Ananth Subramaniam	Indonesia, France
Mothers Are Mothering		Khozy Rizal, Lam Li Shuen	Indonesia, France
Original Wound		Shelby Kho, Sein Lyan Tun	Indonesia, France

(CdO) indicates film eligible for the Caméra d'Or as a feature directorial debut.
(ŒdO) indicates film eligible for the L'Œil d'or as documentary.
(QP) indicates film in competition for the Queer Palm.

=== Directors' Fortnight (Quinzaine des cinéastes) ===
The Directors' Fortnight (Quinzaine des cinéastes) is a parallel section focused on independent cinema and upcoming filmmakers. The official line-up was announced on 14 April 2026. Kantemir Balagov's drama film Butterfly Jam was the section's opening film on 13 May, Quentin Dupieux's animated feature debut Vertiginous was the section's closing film. On 23 April, Bruno Dumont's Red Rocks was officially announced as a Special Screening alongside a masterclass with the filmmaker.

In partnership with the Fondation Chantal Akerman, the People's Choice (Audience Award) will be given by popular vote for the third time during the closing ceremony, alongside €7,500 to the director of the winning feature film. The following films were selected to be screened, consisting of 14 fiction films, three animations, three documentaries and nine short films:

English Title	Original Title	Director(s)	Production Country
9 Temples to Heaven (CdO)	9 วัด สู่สวรรค์	Sompot Chidgasornpongse	Thailand, Norway, France
Atonement (CdO)		Reed Van Dyk	United States
Butterfly Jam (opening film)		Kantemir Balagov	France
Clarissa (QP)		Arie Esiri and Chuko Esiri	United States, Nigeria, Egypt
Death Has No Master	La Muerte no Tiene Dueño	Jorge Thielen Armand	Venezuela, Italy, Luxembourg, Mexico, Spain
The Diary of a Chambermaid	Le Journal d'une Femme de Chambre	Radu Jude	France, Romania
Dora	도라	July Jung	South Korea, France, Luxembourg
Double Freedom	La Libertad Doble	Lisandro Alonso	Argentina, Chile, Luxembourg, Germany, Italy, Uruguay, United Kingdom
Gabin (ŒdO)		Maxence Voiseux	France, Germany, Switzerland
I See Buildings Fall Like Lightning		Clio Barnard	United Kingdom, France, United States
Low Expectations (CdO)	Lave Forventninger	Eivind Landsvik	Norway, Denmark
Once Upon a Time in Harlem (ŒdO)		William Greaves and David Greaves	United States
La Perra		Dominga Sotomayor	Chile, Brazil
Shana		Lila Pinell	France
Thanks for Coming (ŒdO)	Merci d'Être Venu	Alain Cavalier	France
Too Many Beasts (CdO)	l'Espèce Explosive	Sarah Arnold	Germany, France
Vertiginous (closing film)	Le Vertige	Quentin Dupieux	France
Viva Carmen	Carmen, l'Oiseau Rebel	Sebastien Laundenbach	France, Finland, Spain
We Are Aliens (CdO)	我々は宇宙人	Kohei Kadowaki	Japan, France
Special Screenings
I Can't Sleep (1994)	J'ai pas sommeil	Claire Denis	France
Red Rocks	Les Roches Rouges	Bruno Dumont	France, Belgium, Italy, Portugal
Short Films
Daughters of the Late Colonel		Elizabeth Hobbs	United Kingdom, Germany
Early Morning	Madrugada	Sebastián Lojo	Guatemala, Turkey
Eri, The Cow (QP)	エリ	Honami Yano	Japan, France
Free Eliza (Notes on an Anatomical Imperfection)		Alexandra Matheou	Cyprus, Greece, France
In Search of the Grey Bird with Green Stripes	À la Recherche de l'Oiseau Gris aux Rayures Vertes	Saïd Hamich Benlarbi	France
The Joyless Economy		Marjorie Conrad	United States
Nothing Happens After Your Absence	لا شيءَ يحدثُ بعدَ غيابِكَ	Ibrahim Omar	Egypt, Sudan
Oh Boys		Antonio Donato	Italy, United Kingdom, United States
Pithead		Wannes Vanspauwen and Pol De Plecker	Belgium, France

(CdO) indicates film eligible for the Caméra d'Or as a feature directorial debut.
(ŒdO) indicates film eligible for the L'Œil d'or as documentary.
(QP) indicates film in competition for the Queer Palm.

=== ACID ===
Lola Cambourieu and Yann Berlier's French drama film Under a Bad Star was the section opening film on 13 May. The following films were selected to be screened in the ACID (Association du cinéma indépendant pour sa diffusion) section, consisting of six fiction films and three documentaries:

English Title	Original Title	Director(s)	Production Country
Blaise	Les Sauvages	Dimitri Planchon and Jean-Paul Guigue	France
Detention (ŒdO)	La Détention	Guillaume Massart	France
Into the Jaws of the Ogre (ŒdO)	Dans La Gueule de L'Ogre	Mahsa Karampour	France
Living Twice, Dying Thrice		Karim Lakzadeh	Iran
Promised Spaces		Ivan Marković	Serbia, France, Germany, Cambodia
Rewind Barcelona	Barça Zou	Paul Nouhet	France
A Secret Heart (ŒdO) (QP)	Cœur Secret	Tom Fontenille	France
Summer Drift (QP)	Virages	Céline Carridroit and Aline Suter	Switzerland, France
Under a Bad Star (opening film)	Mauvaise Étoile	Lola Cambourieu and Yann Berlier	France

(ŒdO) indicates film eligible for the L'Œil d'or as documentary.
(QP) indicates film in competition for the Queer Palm.

== Parallel programs ==
=== Cannes Écrans Juniors ===
Cannes Écrans Juniors is a selection of eight international feature films of particular interest to young audiences from age 13. The films compete for the Prix Cannes Écrans Juniors and Prix de Bourgogne. The following films were selected to be screened:

English Title	Original Title	Director(s)	Production Country
Atlas of the Universe	Atlasul Universului	Paul Negoescu	Romania, Bulgaria
A Year of School	Un Anno di Scuola	Laura Samani	Italy, France
Flies	Moscas	Fernando Eimbcke	Mexico
The Good Daughter	La buena hija	Júlia de Paz Solvas	Spain
Omaha		Cole Webley	United States
Sad Girlz	Chicas tristes	Fernanda Tovar	Mexico, Spain, France
Sham	でっちあげ	Takashi Miike	Japan
Vanilla	Vainilla	Mayra Hermosillo	Mexico

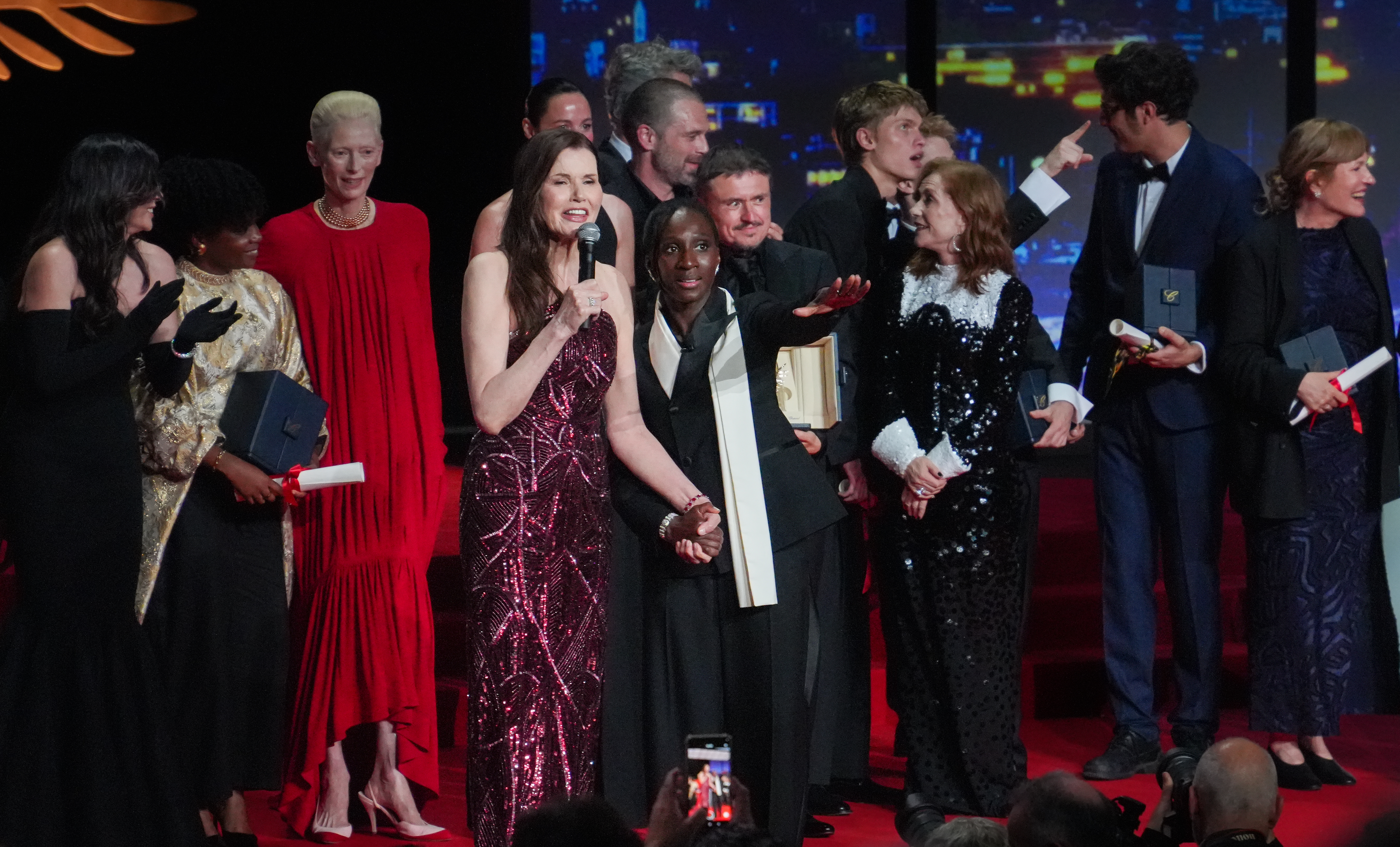
Awards ceremony

== Official Awards ==
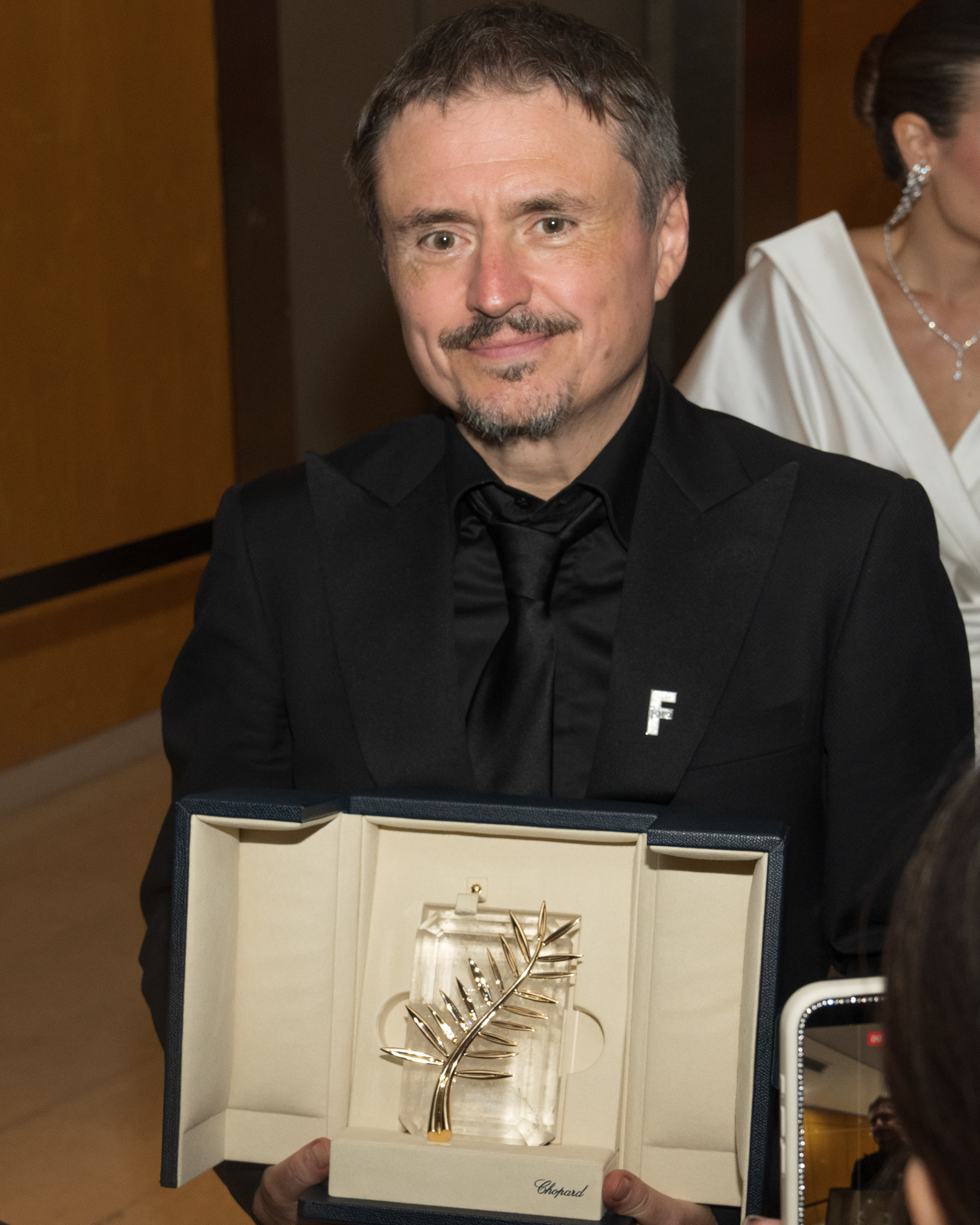
Cristian Mungiu, Palme d'Or winner

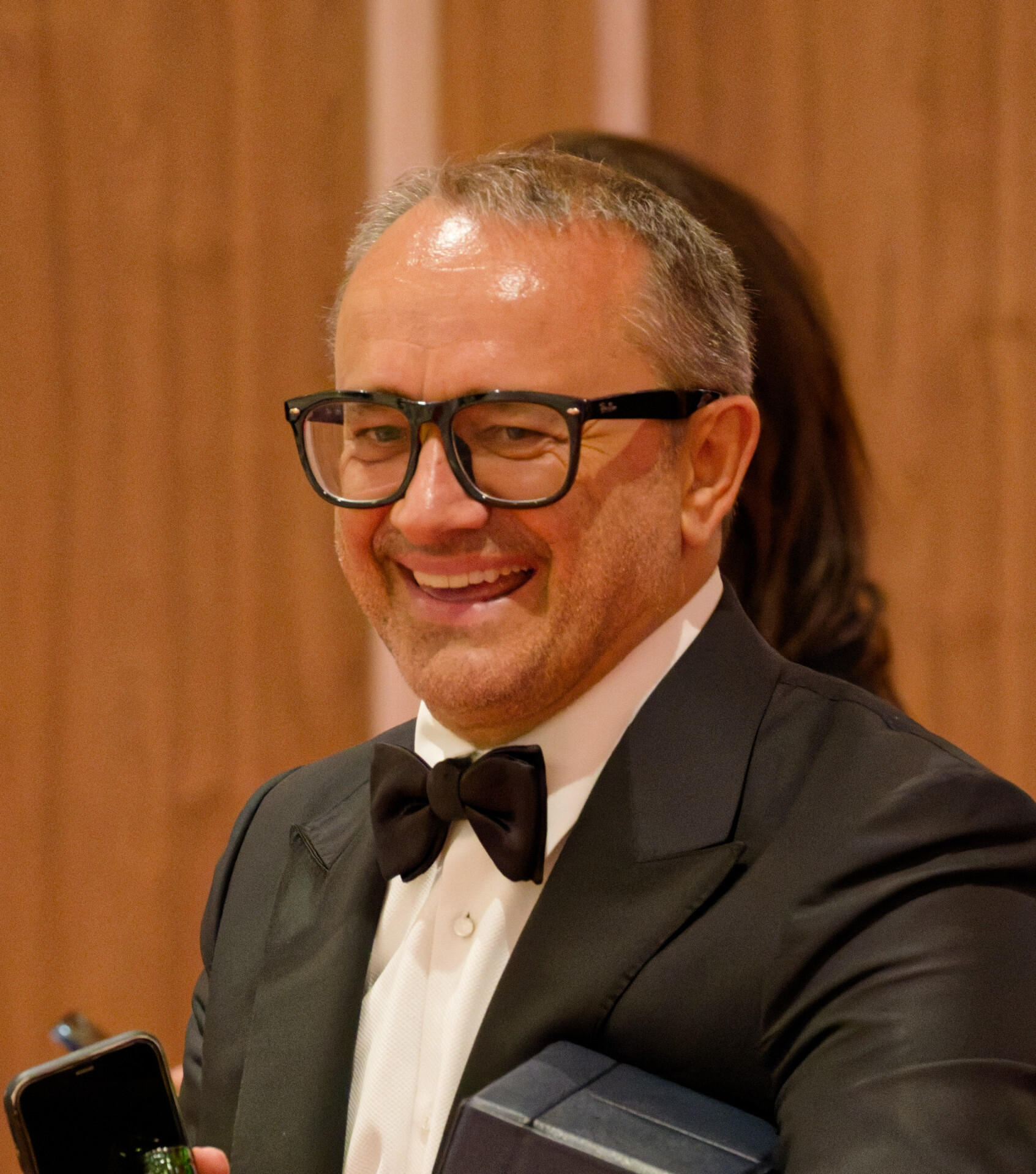
Andrey Zvyagintsev, Grand Prix winner

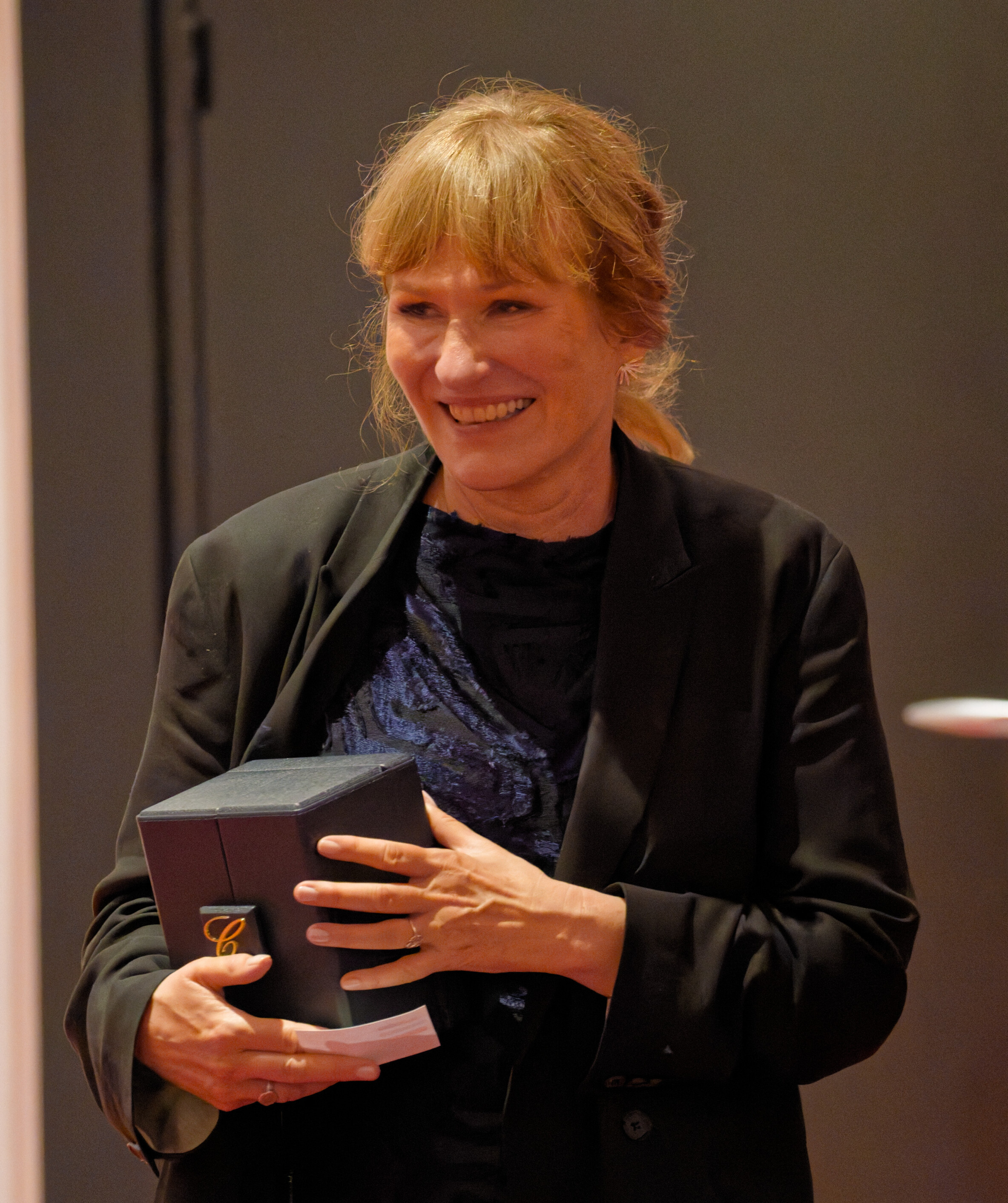
Valeska Grisebach, Jury Prize winner

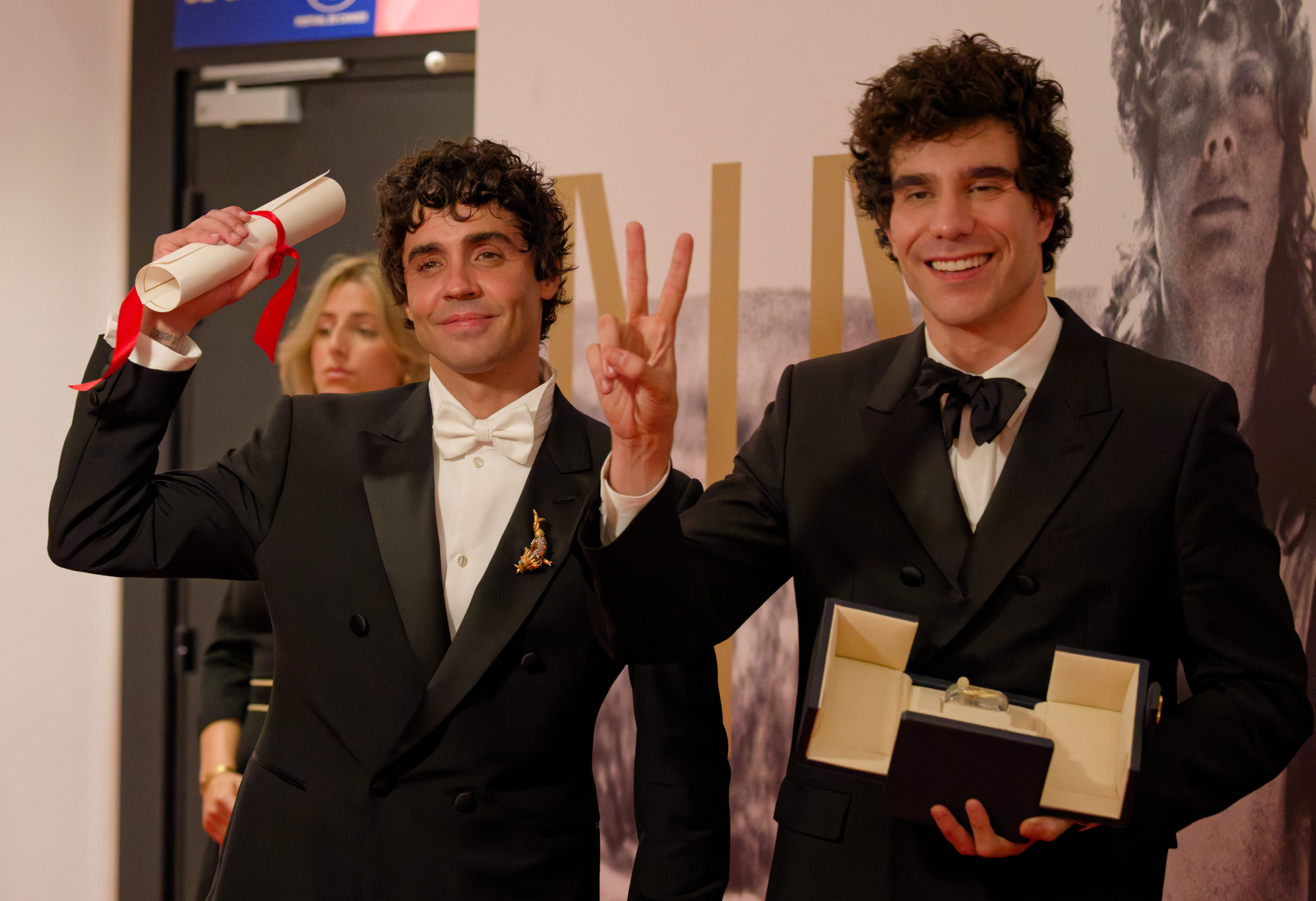
Javier Ambrossi and Javier Calvo, Best Director co-winners

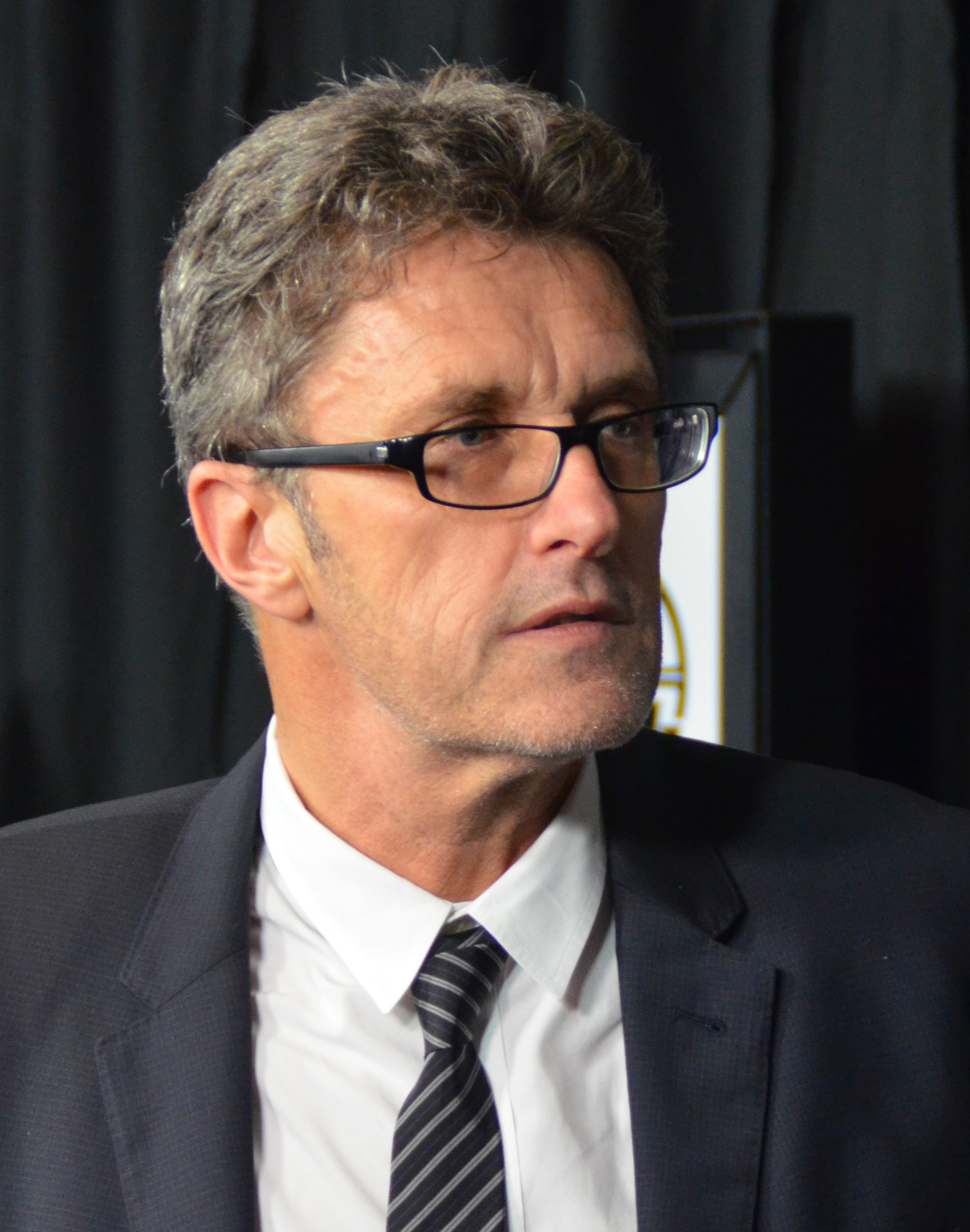
Paweł Pawlikowski, Best Director co-winner

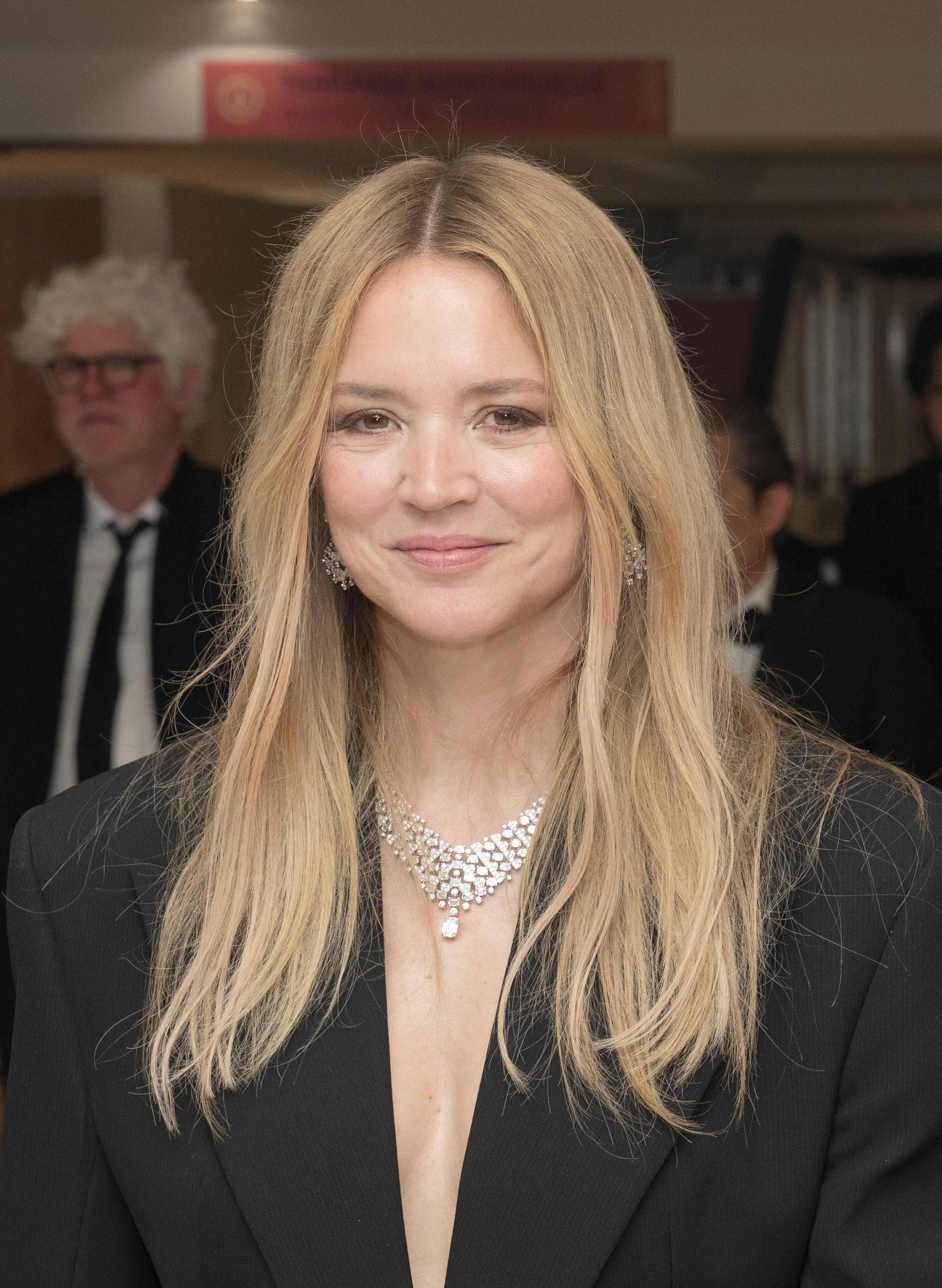
Virginie Efira, Best Actress co-winner

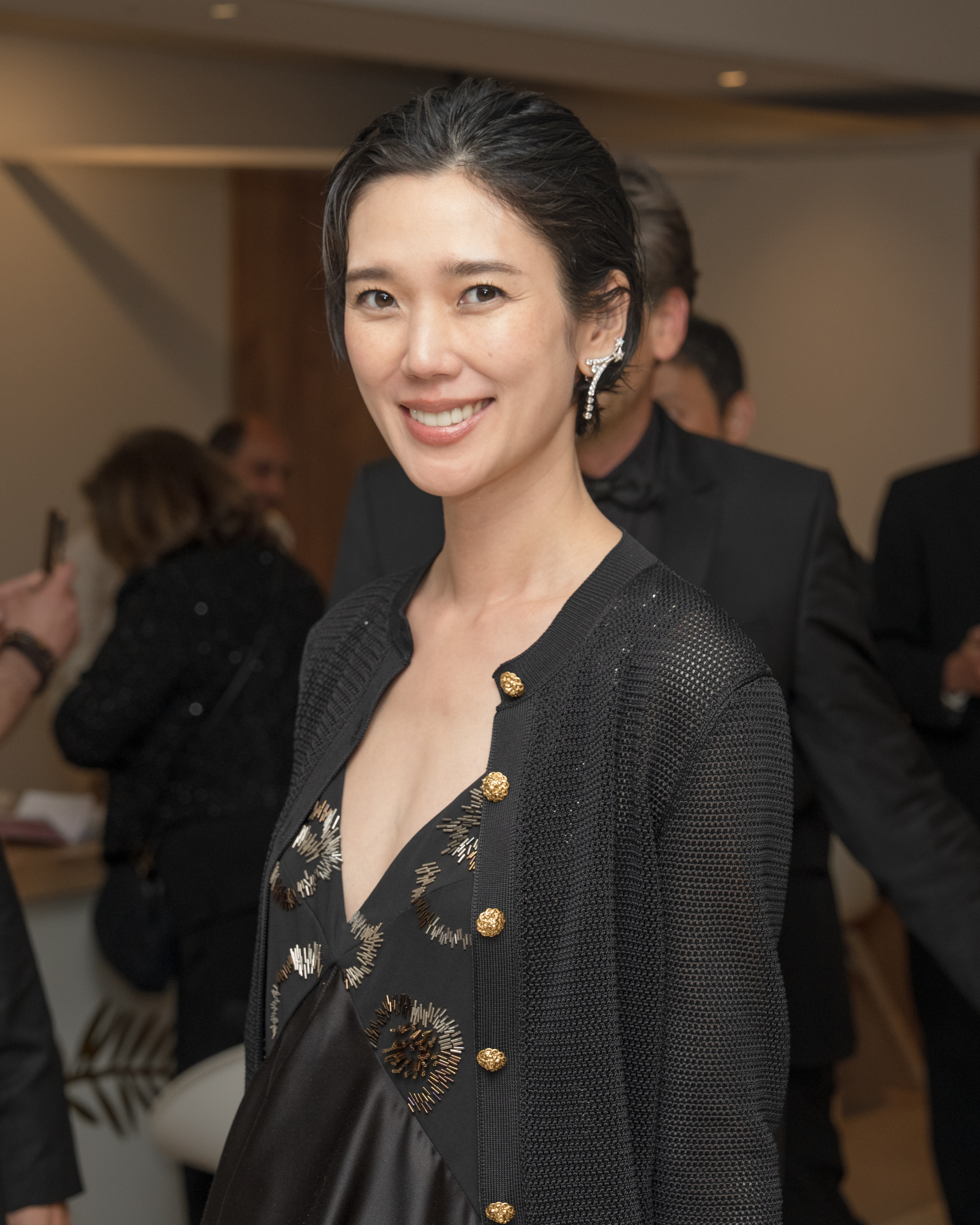
Tao Okamoto, Best Actress co-winner

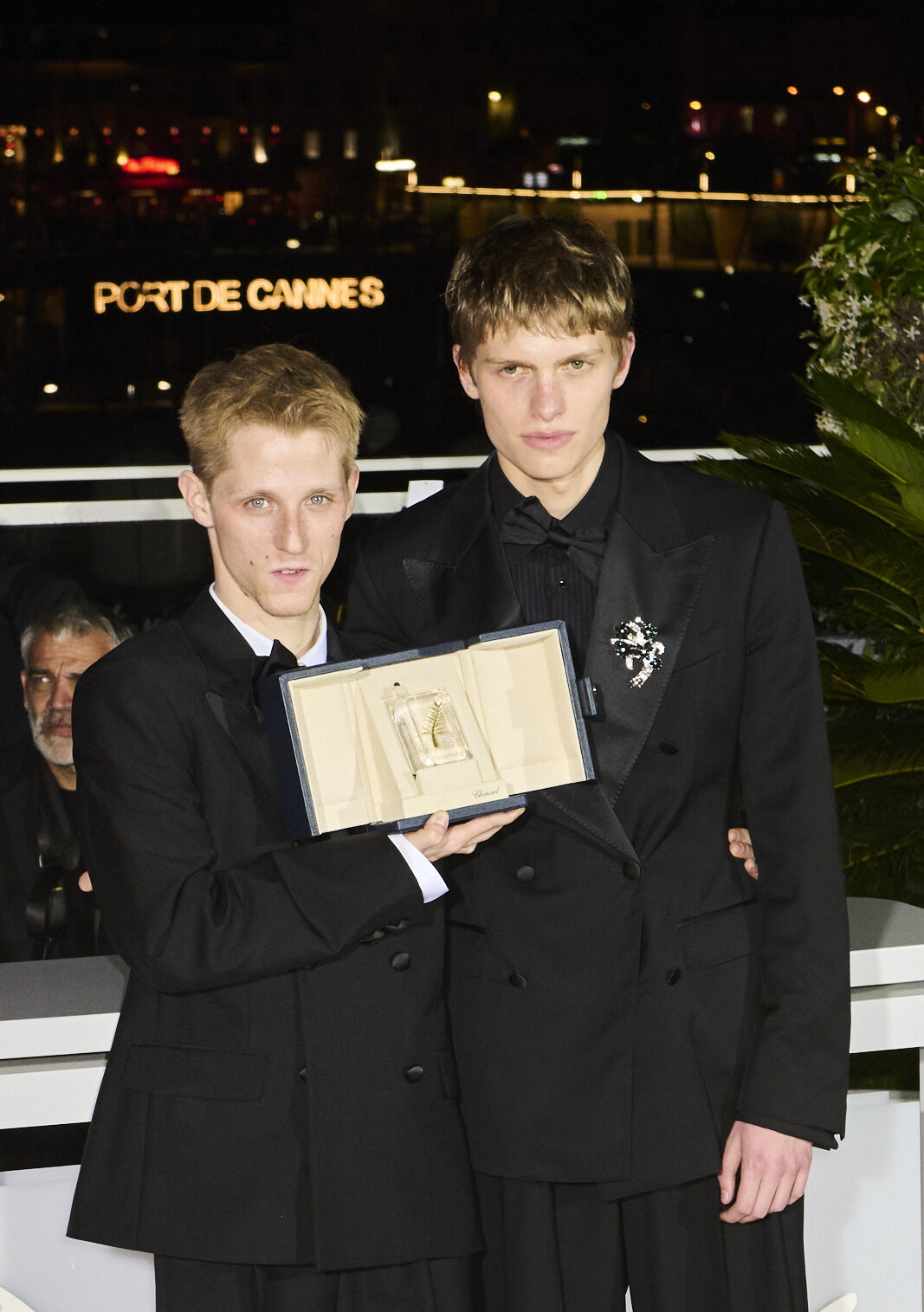
Valentin Campagne and Emmanuel Macchia, Best Actor, winners

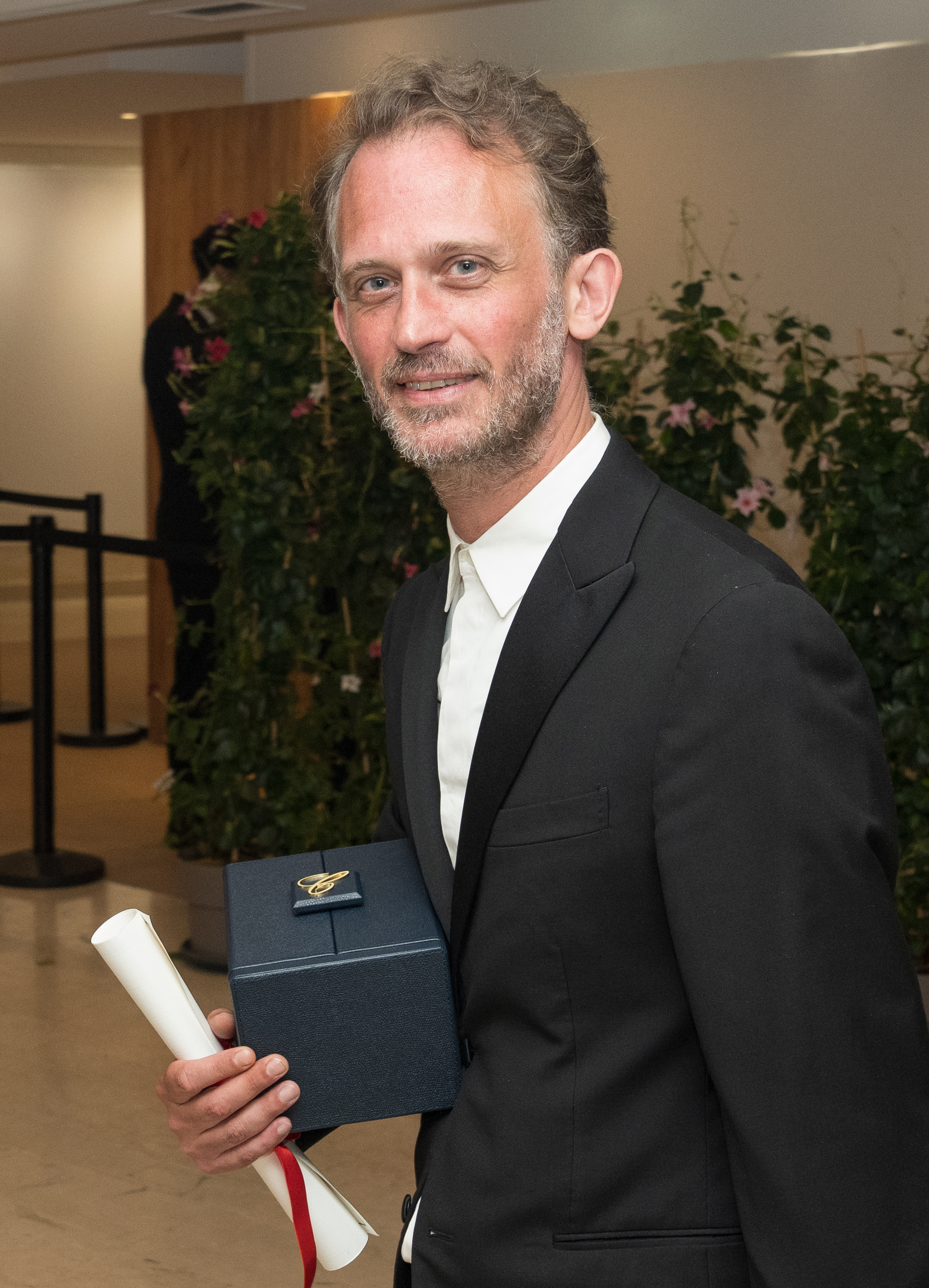
Emmanuel Marre, Best Screenplay, winner

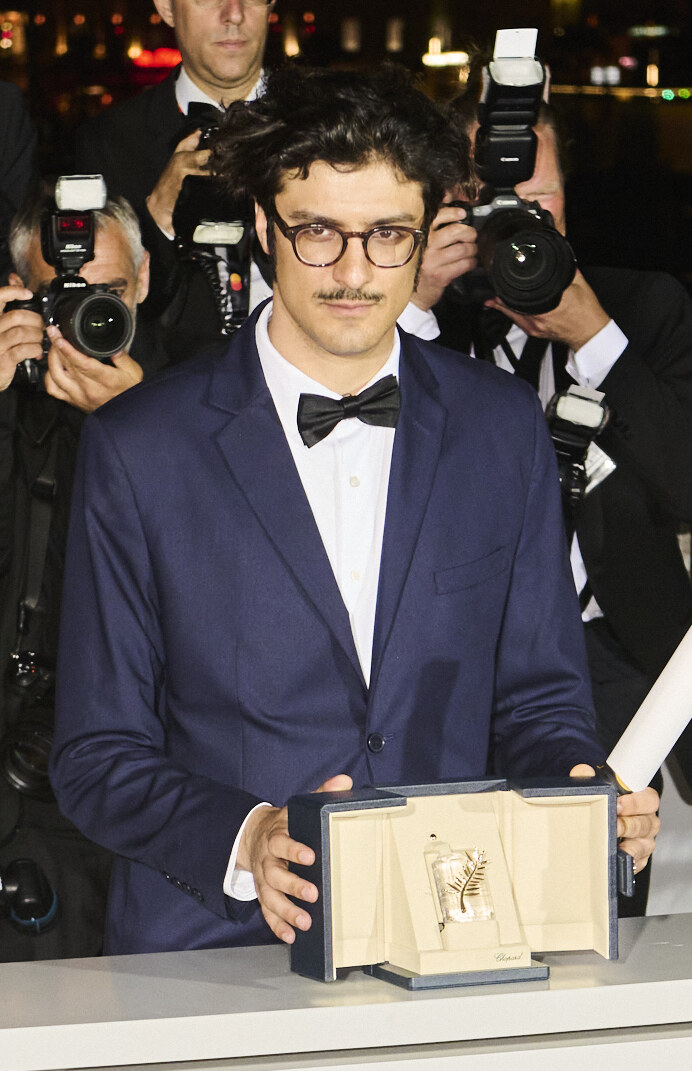
Federico Luis, Short Film Palme d'Or, winner

=== In Competition ===
- Palme d'Or: Fjord by Cristian Mungiu
- Grand Prix: Minotaur by Andrey Zvyagintsev
- Jury Prize: The Dreamed Adventure by Valeska Grisebach
- Best Director:
  - Javier Calvo and Javier Ambrossi for La bola negra
  - Paweł Pawlikowski for Fatherland
- Best Actress: Virginie Efira and Tao Okamoto for All of a Sudden
- Best Actor: Emmanuel Macchia and Valentin Campagne for Coward
- Best Screenplay: Emmanuel Marre for A Man of His Time

=== Un Certain Regard ===
- Un Certain Regard Prize: Everytime by Sandra Wollner
- Jury Prize: Elephants in the Fog by Abinash Bikram Shah
- Special Jury Prize: Iron Boy by Louis Clichy
- Best Actress: Daniela Marín Navarro, Marina de Tavira and Mariangel Villegas for Forever Your Maternal Animal
- Best Actor: Bradley Fiomona Dembeasset for Congo Boy

=== Caméra d'Or ===
- Caméra d'Or: Ben'Imana by Marie Clémentine Dusabejambo

=== Short Films Competition ===
- Short Film Palme d'Or: For the Opponents by Federico Luis

=== Cinéfondation ===
- First Prize: Laser-Cat by Lucas Acher (NYC, United States)
- Second Prize: Silent Voices by Nadine Misong Jin (Columbia University, United States)
- Third Prize:
  - Never Enough by Julius Lagoutte Larsen (La Fémis, France)
  - Growing Stones, Flying Papers by Roozbeh Gezerseh and Soraya Shamsi (Konrad Wolf Film University of Babelsberg, Germany)

=== Immersive Competition ===
- Katábasis by Ugo Arsac
  - Special Mention: The Black Mirror Experience by David Bardos and Damià Ferràndiz

=== Honorary Palme d'Or ===
- Peter Jackson
- Barbra Streisand
- John Travolta

== Independent Awards ==
=== FIPRESCI Prize ===
- In Competition: Fjord by Cristian Mungiu
- Un Certain Regard: Ben'Imana by Marie Clémentine Dusabejambo
- Parallel sections (first features): A Girl Unknown by Zou Jing

=== Prize of the Ecumenical Jury ===
- Prix du Jury Œcuménique: Fjord by Cristian Mungiu

=== Critics' Week ===
- Grand Prize: La Gradiva by Marine Atlan
- Rising Star Award: Aina Clotet for Alive
- Award for Distribution: A Girl Unknown by Zou Jing (Pyramide Distribution)
- SACD Award: Blerta Basholli and Nicole Borgeat for Dua
- Canal+ Award for Short Film: "Vaterland" or a Bule Named Yanto by Berthold Wahjudi
- Discovery Prize for Short Film: Skinny Boots by Romain F. Dubois

=== Directors' Fortnight ===
- Audience Award: I See Buildings Fall Like Lightning by Clio Barnard
- Europa Cinemas Label Award for Best European Film: Too Many Beasts by Sarah Arnold
- SACD Prize for Best French Film: Shana by Shana Pinell
- Carrosse d'Or: Claire Denis

=== L'Œil d'or ===
- Golden Eye: Rehearsals for a Revolution by Pegah Ahangarani
- Special Jury Prize: Tin Castle by Alexander Murphy

=== Queer Palm ===
- Best Film: Teenage Sex and Death at Camp Miasma by Jane Schoenbrun
- Discovery Prize: Flesh and Fuel by Pierre Le Gall
- Best Short Film: Silent Voices by Nadine Misong Jin

=== Prix François Chalais ===
- François Chalais Prize: Fjord by Cristian Mungiu

=== Cannes Soundtrack Award ===
- Cannes Soundtrack Award:
  - Evgueni Galperine and Sacha Galperine for Minotaur
  - Alberto Iglesias for Bitter Christmas

=== CST Award for Best Artist-Technician ===
- CST Award for Best Artist-Technician: Nicolas Rumpl for A Man of His Time (editing)
- CST Award for Best Young Female Artist-Technician: Esther Mysius for The Birthday Party (production designer)

=== Prix de la Citoyenneté ===
- Citizenship Prize: Fjord by Cristian Mungiu
  - Special Mention: A Man of His Time by Emmanuel Marre

=== Prix des Cinémas Art et Essai ===
- AFCAE Art House Cinema Award: A Man of His Time by Emmanuel Marre

=== Prix du Cinéma Positif ===
- Positive Cinema Prize: Coward by Lukas Dhont

=== Palm Dog ===
- Palm Dog Award: Yuri for La Perra
- Grand Jury Prize: Lola for I See Buildings Fall Like Lightning

=== Trophée Chopard ===
- Male Revelation of the Year: Connor Swindells
- Female Revelation of the Year: Odessa A'zion
