= Daniel Soares (filmmaker) =

Portuguese filmmaker and screenwriter

- Born: Germany
- Occupations: Filmmaker; Screenwriter; Photographer

Daniel Soares is a Portuguese screenwriter, filmmaker and photographer. He is best known for his acclaimed short films O Que Resta, awarded the Grand Prix at the Premiers Plans d’Angers Festival, Bad for a Moment, which earned a Special Mention at the 2024 Cannes Film Festival and A Few Things Happening by a River, which was nominated for the Short Film Palme d'Or at the 2026 Cannes Film Festival.

== Early life & background ==
Soares was born in Germany, though his family is Portuguese. He spent childhood summers with his grandparents in a small rural village in Portugal, an experience that influenced his later filmmaking. Before starting his career as a director, he worked as a creative at various agencies.

== Career ==
Soares’s body of work spans several kinds of media: documentary, short fiction, music videos, and fashion films. His previous work has screened at the International Center of Photography, and he has received several international creativity awards, including being named a Young Gun in 2017 by the Art Directors Club in New York, an honour recognizing leading creative talents under the age of 30.

In 2018, Soares documentary film Forgotten screened at numerous festivals in North America, including Brooklyn Film Festival. His first narrative short, O Que Resta, premiered at Clermont Ferrand Film Festival in 2022. It screened at numerous festivals, including Telluride Film Festival and won the Grand Prix at the Premiers Plans d’Angers Festival and Best Portuguese Short Film at the IndieLisboa International Film Festival.

In 2022, Soares participated in the Locarno Spring Academy, an initiative supporting emerging filmmakers, during which he developed his short film Please Make It Work. The film later had its world premiere at the Locarno Film Festival.

In 2024, his short film Bad for a Moment produced by O Som e a Fúria and Kid with a Bike, had its world premiere at the Cannes Film Festival. It screened in competition for the Short Film Palme d’Or and received a Special Mention from the jury.

In 2025, Soares took part in the 11th edition of Ikusmira Berriak, using the residency to develop his debut feature, 900 Tons. The year before, he had also participated in a screenwriting and project-development programme at Le Groupe Ouest, where he began earlier stages of work on the film.

In 2026, Soares returned to the Cannes Film Festival with his short film A Few Things Happening by a River, which was selected for the Short Film Competition and had its world premiere in May, competing for the Short Film Palme d'Or.

== Filmography ==
=== Short films ===
Year	Film	Role	Notes	Ref.
2026	A Few Things Happening by a River	Director, Writer, Editor, Producer		
2024	Bad For A Moment	Director, Writer, Editor, Producer		
2022	Please Make It Work	Director, Writer, Editor, Cinematographer, Producer		
2021	O Que Resta	Director, Writer		
2018	Forgotten	Director	Documentary film	

=== Feature films ===
Year	Film	Role	Notes	Ref.
TBD	900 Tons	Director, Writer		
