= A Few Things Happening by a River =

2026 short film by Daniel Soares

- International promotional poster
- Portuguese: Algumas coisas que acontecem ao lado de um rio
- Directed by: Daniel Soares
- Written by: Daniel Soares
- Produced by: Mouloud Ouyahia; Thaddeus Christandl; Luís Urbano; Daniel Soares; Romina Orsini; Sandro Aguilar
- Starring: Teresa Madruga; João Vicente; Clara Namora; Rui Pedro Silva
- Cinematography: Marta Simões
- Edited by: Sandro Aguilar; Daniel Soares
- Music by: Meara O'Reilly
- Production companies: O Som e a Fúria; L’Oeil Vif Productions; Kid with a Bike Films
- Release date: 22 May 2026 (Cannes)
- Running time: 14 minutes
- Countries: Portugal; France
- Language: Portuguese

A Few Things Happening by a River (Portuguese: Algumas coisas que acontecem ao lado de um rio, released in France as Ceux qui flottent sur la rivière) is a 2026 short film written and directed by Daniel Soares. It stars Teresa Madruga, João Vicente, Clara Namora and Rui Pedro Silva.

The film had its world premiere at the shorts film competition of the 79th Cannes Film Festival on 22 May 2026, where it competed for the Short Film Palme d'Or.

== Plot summary ==
The film follows a group of teenage girls who float down a river while pretending to be dead for social media. As they drift along, one of them fails to resurface and is carried away unnoticed.

== Cast ==
- Teresa Madruga as Rosa
- João Vicente as Miguel
- Clara Namora as Eva
- Rui Pedro Silva as Rui
- Cárin Silva as Cárin
- Dilip Ahuja as Dilip
- Amarjeet Singh as Amarjeet
- Hugo Narciso as Hugo
- Leonor Calheiros as Leonor
- Carolina Monteiro as Carolina
- Maria Velez as Maria
- Guilherme Rebelo as Guilherme
- Manuel Mozos as Carlos
- Concha Nogueira as Diana
- Felipe Rossi
- Matilde Abreu as Matilde
- Kauly Dourado as Kauly

== Production ==
A Few Things Happening by a River was developed by writer/director Daniel Soares through the Berlinale Talents Lab – Short Form Station 2025. The film is an international co-production between O Som e a Fúria (Portugal), L'Oeil Vif Productions (France), and Kid With a Bike Films (Portugal). It was distributed by The Short Film Agency.

The film continues Soares's exploration of contemporary social issues, including social alienation, the fragility of human relationships, labour precarity, and the influence of digital culture on identity.

== Release ==
A Few Things Happening by a River had its world premiere at the 79th Cannes Film Festival, where it was selected for the Official Short Film Competition. The selection marked Soares's return to the Cannes Film Festival following his 2024 short film Bad for a Moment, which received a Special Mention.
