= The Electric Kiss =

2026 film by Pierre Salvadori

- Promotional poster
- French: La Vénus électrique
- Literally: The Electric Venus
- Directed by: Pierre Salvadori
- Screenplay by: Pierre Salvadori; Benjamin Charbit; Benoît Graffin
- Story by: Robin Campillo; Rebecca Zlotowski
- Produced by: Philippe Martin
- Starring: Pio Marmaï; Anaïs Demoustier; Gilles Lellouche; Vimala Pons
- Cinematography: Julien Poupard
- Edited by: Anne-Sophie Bion
- Music by: Camille Bazbaz
- Production companies: Les Films Pelléas; Versus; France 2 Cinéma; Pio & Co; Tovo Films; RTBF; BeTV; Orange; Proximus
- Distributed by: Diaphana Distribution (France); O'Brother Distribution (Belgium)
- Release dates: 12 May 2026 (Cannes); 12 May 2026 (France)
- Running time: 122 minutes
- Countries: France; Belgium
- Language: French
- Box office: $5.1 million

The Electric Kiss (French: La Vénus électrique, lit. 'The Electric Venus') is a 2026 period romantic comedy-drama film directed by Pierre Salvadori, from a screenplay he co-wrote with Benjamin Charbit and Benoît Graffin and based on an original idea by Rebecca Zlotowski and Robin Campillo. It stars Pio Marmaï, Anaïs Demoustier, Gilles Lellouche, and Vimala Pons. The plot follows a young grieving painter who tries to contact his dead wife through a psychic after losing his inspiration to work.

The film had its world premiere as the opening film of the 2026 Cannes Film Festival on 12 May and was released theatrically in France on the same day by Diaphana Distribution.

== Plot ==
In Paris, 1928, young painter Antoine Balestro mourns the death of his wife Irène, which he blames himself for and which has caused him to lose his motivation to paint. Having turned to alcohol, he attempts to contact his wife through a psychic one night. A young carnival worker named Suzanne, who has only snuck into the trailer to steal food, pretends to be a clairvoyant for Antoine. Antoine's art dealer, Armand, is desperate to have his client continue painting so he convinces Suzanne to keep up the act in exchange for paying her debts. She begins staging improvised séances for Antoine where she pretends to channel Irène. As Antoine gradually improves, Suzanne finds herself falling in love with the man she is manipulating.

== Cast ==
- Pio Marmaï as Antoine Balestro
- Anaïs Demoustier as Suzanne
- Gilles Lellouche as Armand
- Vimala Pons as Irène
- Gustave Kervern
- Madeleine Baudot

== Production ==
Salvadori wrote the film's screenplay with Benjamin Charbit and Benoît Graffin based on an original idea by Rebecca Zlotowski and Robin Campillo. The film was produced by Philippe Martin for Les Films Pelléas, in co-production with Versus, France 2 Cinéma, Pio & Co, Tovo Films, RTBF, BeTV, Orange, Proximus.

Principal photography began on 26 May 2025. Shooting was scheduled to last ten weeks, taking place in Belgium (in Liège and the surrounding area), Paris and the Île-de-France region, and expected to continue until 1 August 2025.

== Release ==
The Electric Kiss was selected to be the opening film at the 79th Cannes Film Festival, where it had its world premiere out-of-competition on 12 May 2026, it was released theatrically in France on the same day by Diaphana Distribution. O'Brother Distribution is set to distribute the film in Belgium.

In January 2026, Goodfellas acquired international sales for the film, then titled Venus Electrificata, and presented the film for distributors during the 28th Unifrance Rendez-Vous in Paris later that same month.

== Reception ==
On the review aggregator website Rotten Tomatoes, 52% of 23 critics' reviews are positive, with an average rating of 5.6/10. Metacritic, which uses a weighted average, assigned the film a score of 45 out of 100, based on 9 critics, indicating "mixed or average" reviews. On AlloCiné, the film received an average rating of 4.0 out of 5 stars, based on 10 reviews from French critics.
