= Silent Voices (2026 film) =

2026 short film by Nadine Misong Jin

- Directed by: Nadine Misong Jin
- Written by: Nadine Misong Jin
- Produced by: Nadine Misong Jin; Yuwen Zhang
- Starring: Sook Hyung Yang; Jongman Kim; Amy Yeh; Chloe Chan
- Cinematography: Zhejian Michael Cong
- Edited by: Nadine Misong Jin
- Release date: 19 May 2026 (Cannes)
- Running time: 17 minutes
- Countries: South Korea; United States
- Language: English

Silent Voices is a 2026 drama short film written and directed by Nadine Misong Jin, made as her student project while graduating at Columbia University. It centers on a family of Korean immigrants living in New York City, who are struggling to adapt to their new circumstances and shielding each other from their pain.

The film had its world premiere at the Cinéfondation section of the 2026 Cannes Film Festival on 19 May, where it won the section's second prize and the Queer Palm for Best Short Film.

== Cast ==
- Sook Hyung Yang as Yujin
- Jongman Kin as Hyunwoo
- Amy Yeh as Minha
- Chloe Chan as Sohee
- Maria Müller as Danielle

== Release ==
The film had its world premiere at the Cinéfondation section of the 2026 Cannes Film Festival, where it won second prize in the La Cinef competition and won the Queer Palm for Best Short Film.
