= Cinéfondation =

International foundation of filmmakers

Cinéfondation is a foundation under the aegis of the Cannes Film Festival, created to inspire and support the next generation of international filmmakers.

It was created in 1998 by Gilles Jacob. Since then it has developed complementary programmes to help achieve its goal. Today it is divided into three different parts: The Selection; The Residence; The Atelier.

== The Selection ==
Each year, the Cinéfondation selects 15 to 20 short and medium-length films presented by film schools from all over the world. Cinéfondation's Selection (French: La Sélection) is a parallel section of the Official Selection of Cannes Film Festival.

Every year, more than 1,000 student films reach the Cinéfondation to present their film to la Sélection. This selection of films is projected at the Cannes Festival and presented to the Cinéfondation and Shorts Jury, which awards prizes to the best three at an official Festival ceremony.

=== Prize winners ===
Year	Film	Director	Nationality of director	Award	Ref
1998	Jakub	Adam Guzinski	Poland	Premier Prix (Note: First Prize)	
1998	The Sheep Thief	Asif Kapadia	United Kingdom	Deuxième Prix (Note: Second Prize)	
1998	Mangwana	Manu Kurewa	Zimbabwe	Troisième Prix (Note: Third Prize)	
1999	Second Hand	Emily Young	United Kingdom	Premier Prix	
1999	La Puce	Emmanuelle Bercot	France	Deuxième Prix	
1999	Im Hukim	Dover Kosashvili	Georgia - Israel	Deuxième Prix	
1999	En God Dag at Go	Bo Hagen Clausen	Denmark	Troisième Prix	
1999	Inter-View	Jessica Hausner	Austria	Mention Spéciale	
2000	Five Feet High and Rising	Peter Sollett	United States	Premier Prix	
2000	Kiss it up to God	Caran Hartsfield	United States	Deuxième Prix	
2000	Kinu'Ach	Amit Sakomski	Israel	Deuxième Prix	
2000	Indien	Pernille Fischer Christensen	Denmark	Troisième Prix	
2000	Cuoc Xe-Dem	Bui Thac Chuyên	Vietnam	Troisième Prix	
2001	Portrait	Sergei Luchishin	Russia	Premier Prix	
2001	Reparation	Jens Jonsson	Sweden	Deuxième Prix	
2001	Dai Bi	Yang Chao	China	Troisième Prix	
2001	Crow Stone	Alicia Duffy	United Kingdom	Troisième Prix	
2002	Um Sol Alaranjado	Eduardo Valente	Brazil	Premier Prix	
2002	Seule Maman a les Yeux Bleus	Eric Forestier	France	Deuxième Prix	
2002	K-G i Nod Och Lust	Jens Jonsson	Sweden	Deuxième Prix	
2002	She'elot Shel Po'el Met	Aya Somech	Israel	Troisième Prix	
2003	Bezi Zeko Bezi	Pavle Vuckovic	Serbia	Premier Prix	
2003	Historia del Desierto	Celia Galán Julve	Spain	Deuxième Prix	
2003	TV City	Alberto Couceiro and Alejandra Tomei	Argentina	Troisième Prix	
2003	Rebeca a esas Alturas	Luciana Jauffred Gorostiza	Mexico	Troisième Prix	
2004	Happy Now	Frederikke Aspöck	Denmark	Premier Prix	
2004	Calatorie la Oras	Corneliu Porumboiu	Romania	Deuxième Prix	
2004	99 Vuotta Elämästäni	Marja Mikkonen	Finland	Deuxième Prix	
2004	Fajnie, że jesteś	Jan Komasa	Poland	Troisième Prix	
2005	Buy It Now	Antonio Campos	Brazil, United States	Premier Prix	
2005	Vdvoyom	Nikolay Khomeriki	Russia	Deuxième Prix	
2005	Bikur Holim	Maya Dreifuss	Israel	Deuxième Prix	
2005	La Plaine	Roland Edzard	Germany, France	Troisième Prix	
2005	Be Quiet	Sameh Zoabi	Palestine	Troisième Prix	
2006	Ge & Zeta	Gustavo Riet	Uruguay	Premier Prix	
2006	Mr. Schartz, Mr. Hazen & Mr. Horlocker	Stefan Mueller	Germany	Deuxième Prix	
2006	Mother	Sian Heder	United States	Troisième Prix	
2006	A Virus	Ágnes Kocsis	Hungary	Troisième Prix	
2007	Ahora Todos Parecen Contentos	Gonzalo Tobal	Argentina	Premier Prix	
2007	Ru Dao	Chen Tao	China	Deuxième Prix	
2007	A Reunion	Hong Sung-Hoon	South Korea	Troisième Prix	
2007	Minus	Pavle Vuckovic	Serbia	Troisième Prix	
2008	Hymnon	Elad Keidan	Israel	Premier Prix	
2008	Forbach	Claire Burger	France	Deuxième Prix	
2008	Stop	Park Jae-Ok	South Korea	Troisième Prix	
2008	Roadmarkers	Juho Kuosmanen	Finland	Troisième Prix	
2009	Bába	Zuzana Kirchnerová	Czech Republic	Premier Prix	
2009	Goodbye	Fang Song	China	Deuxième Prix	
2009	Diploma	Yaelle Kayam	Israel	Troisième Prix	
2009	Nammae Ui Jip	Jo Sung-hee	South Korea	Troisième Prix	
2010	Taulukauppiaat	Juho Kuosmanen	Finland	Premier Prix	
2010	Coucou-les-Nouages	Vincent Cardona	France	Deuxième Prix	
2010	The Fifth Column	Vatche Boulghourjian	Lebanon	Troisième Prix	
2010	Ja Vec Jesam Sve Ono Sto Zelim da Imam	Dane Komljen	Serbia	Troisième Prix	
2011	Der Brief	Doroteya Droumeva	Bulgaria	Premier Prix	
2011	Drari	Kamal Lazraq	Morocco	Deuxième Prix	
2011	Ya-gan-bi-hang	Son Tae-Gyum	South Korea	Troisième Prix	
2012	Doroga na	Taisia Igumentseva	Russia	Premier Prix	
2012	Abigail	Matthew James Reilly	United States	Deuxième Prix	
2012	Los Anfitriones	Miguel Angel Moulet	Cuba	Troisième Prix	
2013	Needle	Anahita Ghazvinizadeh	United States	Premier Prix	
2013	Waiting for the Thaw	Sarah Hirtt	Belgium	Deuxième Prix	
2013	În Acvariu	Tudor Cristian Jurgiu	Romania	Troisième Prix	
2013	Pandy	Matúš Vizár	Slovakia	Troisième Prix	
2014	Skunk	Annie Silverstein	United States	Premier Prix	
2014	Oh Lucy!	Atsuko Hirayanagi	Japan - Singapore	Deuxième Prix	
2014	Sourdough	Fulvio Risuleo	Italy	Troisième Prix	
2014	The Bigger Picture	Daisy Jacobs	United Kingdom	Troisième Prix	
2015	Share	Pippa Bianco	United States	Premier Prix	
2015	Lost Queens	Ignacio Juricic Merillán	Chile	Deuxième Prix	
2015	The Return of Erkin	Maria Guskova	Russia	Troisième Prix	
2015	Victor XX	Ian Garrido López	Spain	Troisième Prix	
2016	Anna	Or Sinai	Israel	Premier Prix	
2016	In the Hills	Hamid Ahmadi	United Kingdom	Deuxième Prix	
2016	The Noise of Licking	Nadja Andrasev	Hungary	Troisième Prix	
2017	Paul is Here	Valentina Maurel	Belgium	Premier Prix	
2017	Animal	Bahman and Bahram Ark	Iran	Deuxième Prix	
2017	Deux Égarés Sont Morts	Tommaso Usberti	France	Troisième Prix	
2018	The Summer of the Electric Lion	Diego Céspedes	Chile	Premier Prix	
2018	Calendar	Igor Poplauhin	Russia	Deuxième Prix	
2018	The Storms in Our Blood	Shen Di	China	Deuxième Prix	
2018	Inanimate	Lucia Bulgheroni	United Kingdom	Troisième Prix	
2019	Mano a mano	Louise Courvoisier	France	Premier Prix	
2019	Hiêu	Richard Van	United States	Deuxième Prix	
2019	Ambience	Wisam Al Jafari	Palestine	Troisième Prix	
2019	The Little Soul	Barbara Rupik	Poland	Troisième Prix	
2020	Catdog	Ashmita Guha Neogi	India	Premier Prix	
2020	My Fat Arse and I	Yelyzaveta Pysmak	Poland, Ukraine	Deuxième Prix	
2020	Contraindications	Lucia Chicos	Romania	Troisième Prix	
2020	I Want to Return Return Return	Elsa Rosengren	Germany	Troisième Prix	
2021	The Salamander Child	Théo Degen	Belgium	Premier Prix	
2021	Cicada	Yoon Daewoen	South Korea	Deuxième Prix	
2021	Love Stories on the Move	Carina-Gabriela Daşoveanu	Romania	Troisième Prix	
2021	Cantareira	Rodrigo Ribeyro	Brazil	Troisième Prix	
2022	A Conspiracy Man	Valerio Ferrara	Italy	Premier Prix	
2022	Somewhere	Li Jiahe	China	Deuxième Prix	
2022	Glorious Revolution	Masha Novikova	United Kingdom	Troisième Prix	
2022	Humans Are Dumber When Crammed up Together	Laurène Fernandez	France	Troisième Prix	
2023	Norwegian Offspring	Marlene Emilie Lyngstad	Denmark	Premier Prix	
2023	Hole	Hwang Hyein	South Korea	Deuxième Prix	
2023	Moon	Zineb Wakrim	Morocco	Troisième Prix	
2024	Sunflowers Were the First Ones to Know...	Chidananda S Naik	India	Premier Prix	
2024	Out of the Window Through the Wall	Asya Segalovich	United States	Deuxième Prix	
2024	The Chaos She Left Behind	Nikos Kolioukos	Greece	Deuxième Prix	
2024	Bunnyhood	Mansi Maheshwari	United Kingdom	Troisième Prix	
2025	First Summer	Heo Gayoung	South Korea	Premier Prix	
2025	12 Moments Before the Flag-Raising Ceremony	Qu Zhizheng	China	Deuxième Prix	
2025	Ginger Boy (Separated)	Miki Tanaka	Japan	Troisième Prix	
2025	Winter in March	Natalia Mirzoyan	Estonia	Troisième Prix	
2026	Laser-Cat	Lucas Acher	Brazil	Premier Prix	
2026	Silent Voices	Nadine Misong Jin	South Korea, United States	Deuxième Prix	
2026	Never Enough (Aldrig nok)	Julius Lagoutte Larsen	France	Troisième Prix	
2026	Growing Stones, Flying Papers	Roozbeh Gezerseh, Soraya Shamsi	Germany	Troisième Prix	

== The Residence ==
The Residence du Festival (French: La Résidence) is a programme for young international directors working on their first or second film. Each year twelve participants are selected and invited to live in Paris for four and a half months as they embark on a course designed to help them in the writing and production of their films, with help and support from film professionals.

The following sessions have been conducted since the inception of the programme.

Session number	Dates conducted	President of the jury	Participants
1st	October 16, 2000 - February 24, 2001	Olivier Assayas	Caran Hartsfield, Marcell Ivanyi, Hanna Miettinen, Peter Sollett, Rachel Tillotson, Emily Young
2nd	March 1, 2001 - July 15, 2001	Olivier Assayas	Laurie Collyer, Maximiliano Lemcke Gonzalez, Iwona Siekierzynska, Ilgon Song, Djamshed Usmonov, Ken Yunome
3rd	October 1, 2001 - February 13, 2002	Pascale Ferran	Newton Aduaka, Piotr Kielar, Lucrecia Martel, Michel Ange Quay, Aleksi Salmenperä, Nariman Turebayev
4th	February 21, 2002 - June 30, 2002	Costa-Gavras	Alicia Duffy, Jens Jonsson, Emmanuel Kurewa, Sergeï Luchishin, Franco De Peña, Heng Tang
5th	October 1, 2002 - February 12, 2003	André Delvaux	Ewa Banaszkiewicz, Edgar Bartenev, Anastas Charalampidis, Marc Hartmann, Diego Lerman, John Shank
6th	February 27, 2003 - July 11, 2003	Francis Girod	Brahim Fritah, Vimukthi Jayasundara, Santiago Loza, Cath Le Couteur, Jinoh Park, Ulises Rosell, Dong-Il Shin
7th	October 1, 2003 - February 11, 2004	Claire Denis	Veronica Chen, Kornel Mundruczó, Stephen Ellis, Karim Aïnouz, Marta Parlatore, Jacob Tschernia, Kirsi Marie Liimatainen
8th	February 27, 2004 - July 10, 2004	Arnaud Desplechin	Hadar Friedlich, Céline Macherel, Vladimir Perisic, Jaime Rosales, Dorothée Van Den Berghe, Wang Bing
9th	October 1, 2004 - February 12, 2005	Marion Vernoux	Tawfik Abu Wael, Celia Galan Julve, Brendan Grant, Nadine Labaki, Josué Méndez, Slava Ross
10th	February 28, 2005 - July 10, 2005	Santiago Amigorena	Hernán Belón, Jukka-Pekka Valkeapää, Noam Kaplan, Jeffrey St. Jules, Corneliu Porumboiu, Eduardo Valente
11th	October 3, 2005 - February 12, 2006	Christine Laurent	Kim Hee-Jung, Raya Martin, Sameh Zoabi, Ben Hackworth, Santiago Palavecino, Mark Walker
12th	February 28, 2006 - July 10, 2006	Bruno Dumont	Pablo Agüero, Amat Escalante, Kit Hui, Abay Kulbayev, Marianela Maldonado, Lucía Puenzo
13th	October 2, 2006 - February 9, 2007	Rithy Panh	Antonio Campos, Natacha Feola, Babak Jalali, Sebastian Lelio, Alexis Dos Santos, Fien Troch
14th	March 1, 2007 - July 17, 2007	Laurent Cantet	Rusudan Chkonia, Pelin Esmer, Mitra Farahani, Tan Chui Mui, Nadav Lapid, Milagros Mumenthaler
15th	October 1, 2007 - February 15, 2008	Sébastien Lifshitz	Emilie Atef, Hagar Ben Asher, Barney Elliott, Xiaolu Guo, Rubén Imaz Castro, Pia Marais
16th	March 3, 2008 - July 15, 2008	Gilles Jacob	Nikias Chryssos, Rebecca Daly, Manuel Nieto Zas, Adrian Sitaru, Francisco Vargas Quevedo, Yang Heng
17th	October 1, 2008 - February 15, 2009	Gilles Jacob	Babak Amini, Anna Faur, Aaron Fernandez, Alejandro Landes, Liew Seng Tat, Robin Weng
18th	March 2, 2009 - July 15, 2009	Gilles Jacob	Andreas Bolm, Julio Hernández Cordón, Yula Gidron, Rafael Kapelinski, Esteban Larrain, Martin Turk
19th	October 1, 2009 - February 15, 2010	Gilles Jacob	Paz Fabrega, Oliver Hermanus, Bani Khoshnoudi, Andrew Legge, Ioana Uricaru, Zhang Yue
20th	March 1, 2010 - July 15, 2010	Gilles Jacob	Daniel Joseph Borgman, Michel Franco, Cristián Jiménez, Yaelle Kayam, Franco Lolli, Dominga Sotomayor
21st	October 1, 2010 - February 15, 2011	Gilles Jacob	Chika Anadu, Fernando Guzzoni, Ronin Hsu, Rubén Mendoza, Oscar Ruiz Navia, Shahrabanoo Sadat
22nd	March 1, 2011 - July 15, 2011	Gilles Jacob	Sivaroj Kongsakul, Julia Kozyreva, David Nawrath, Laszlo Nemes, Pramote Sangsorn, Bohdana Smyrnova
23rd	October 3, 2011 - February 15, 2012	Gilles Jacob	Marí Alessandrini, René Ballesteros, Etienne Kallos, Mariko Saga, Christopher Murray, Felipe Sholl
24th	March 1, 2012 - July 15, 2012	Gilles Jacob	Jairo Boisier Olave, Alireza Khatami, Juliana Rojas, Jéro Yun, Pasquale Marino, Simon Jaikiriuma Paetau
25th	October 1, 2012 - February 15, 2013	Gilles Jacob	Kamila Andini, Laura Astorga, Aygul Bakanova, Marina Meliande, Sanjeewa Pushpakumara, Jordan Schiele
26th	March 1, 2013 - July 15, 2013	Gilles Jacob	Fyzal Boulifa, Mahdi Fleifel, Rungano Nyoni, Adrián Saba, William Vega, Géraldine Zosso
27th	October 1, 2013 - February 15, 2014	Gilles Jacob	Giacomo Abbruzzese, Natalia Almada, Panayotis Christopoulos, Susan Gordanshekan, Hicham Lasri, Ma'ayan Rypp
28th	March 3, 2014 - July 15, 2014	Gilles Jacob	Caetano Gotardo, Gudmundur Gudmudsson, Sam Holst, Marcelo Martinessi, Marcela Saïd, Katarina Stankovic
29th	October 1, 2014 - February 15, 2015	Gilles Jacob	Alejandro Fadel, Damian John Harper, Hannaleena Hauru, Karim Moussaoui, Ruthy Pribar, Flora Lau
30th	March 2, 2015 - July 15, 2015	Gilles Jacob	Khadar Ahmed, Jonas Carpignano, Una Gunjak, Serhat Karaaslan, Gábor Reisz, Ernesto Villalobos
31st	October 1, 2015 - February 15, 2016	Gilles Jacob	Duccio Chiarini, Maya Da-Rin, Georgis Grigorakis, Zhou Hao, Déa Kulumbegashvili, Sebastián Schjaer
32nd	March 1, 2016 - July 15, 2016	Gilles Jacob	Ali Asgari, Nuno Baltazar, Federico Cecchetti, Omar El Zohairy, Gregorio Graziosi, Ivan Ikić
33rd	October 3, 2016 - February 15, 2017	Gilles Jacob	Lukas Dhont, Cenk Erturk, Takeshi Fukunaga, Zeno Graton, Caroline Monnet, Mees Peijnenburg
34th	March 1, 2017 - July 15, 2017	Gilles Jacob	Rati Tsiteladze, João Paulo Miranda Maria, JQIU Yang, Myrsini Aristidou, Carlo Sironi, Anwar Boulifa
35th	October 2, 2017 - February 15, 2018	Gilles Jacob	Mounia Akl, Antoneta Alamat Kusijanović, Sharon Angelhart, Juan Sebastian Mesa, Teodora Ana Mihai, Kavich Neang
36th	March 1, 2018 - July 15, 2018	Gilles Jacob	César Augusto Acevedo, Chia-Hsin Liu, Min Bahadur Bham, Santiago Lozano, Sara Kern, Mariam (Bakacho) Khatchvan
37th	October 1, 2018 - February 15, 2019	Gilles Jacob	Machérie Ekwa, Elena Lopez Riera, Marian Mathias, George Sikarulidze, Carla Simón, Tommaso Usberti
38th	March 1, 2019 - July 15, 2019	Gilles Jacob	Aboozar Amini, Alvaro Aponte-Centeno, Diego Céspedes, Alireza Ghasemi, Dmytro Sukholytkyy-Sobchuk, Vinko Tomicic
39th	October 1, 2019–February 15, 2020		Wei Liang Chiang, Zi Gao, Urška Djukić, Rhys Jones, Raven Johnson, and Payal Kapadia
40th	February 2–July 11, 2020		Guillermo Galoe, Samuel Ishimwe, Rodrigo Barriuso, Bernhard Wenger, Hana Jušić, and Miki Polonski
41st	October 1, 2020–February 15, 2021		Thessa Meijer, Orkhan Aghazadeh, Saleh Kashefi, Rafael Mendoza, Henning Beckhoff, and Erenik Beqiri
42nd	February 27–July 11, 2021		Inbar Horesh, David Vicente, Azadi Behzad, Lucia Aleñar Iglesias, Marta Hernaiz Pidal, and Sameh Alaa
43rd	October 1, 2021–February 15, 2022		Sabine Ehrl, Borbála Nagy, Judita Gamulin, Juan Cáceres, Maung Sun, and Rongfei Guo
44th	March 1–July 15, 2022		Arvin Belarmino, Dina Duma, Andrei Epure, Resek Katarina, Flurin Giger, and Laura Wandel
45th	March 1–July 15, 2023		Don Josephus Raphael Eblahan, Diana Mashanova, Laura Samani, Yi Tang, Morad Mostafa, and Mohammadreza Mayghani
46th	October 1, 2023–February 15, 2024		Asmae El Moudir, Meltse Van Coillie, Andrea Slavicek, Diana Cam Van Nguyen, Hao Zhao, and Gessica Généus
47th	March 15–July 31, 2024		Danech San, Molly Manning Walker, Aditya Ahmad, Ernst de Geer, Daria Kashcheeva, and Anastasiia Solonevych
48th	October 1, 2024 – February 15, 2025		Rudolf Fitzgerald-Leonard, Sofia Alaoui, Anastasia Veber, Diwa Shah, Eglė Razumaitė, and Theo Montoya
49th	March 15–July 31, 2025		Flóra Anna Buda, Andrea Gatopoulos, Xiwen Cong, Simon Maria Kubiena, Constance Tsang, and Rodrigo Ribeyro
50th	October 1, 2025 – February 15, 2026		Laís Santos Araújo, Baran Sarmad, Dian Weys, Federico Luis, Maksym Nakonechnyi, and Alica Bednáriková
51st	March 16–July 31, 2026		Harry Lighton, Emma Branderhorst, Joecar Hanna, Saulė Bliuvaitė, Mansi Maheshwari, Oliver McGoldrick
52nd	October 1, 2026–February 15, 2027		Agustina Sánchez Gavier, Dorian Jespers, Vytautas Katkus, Sam Manacsa, Anna Llargués Muñoz, Ananth Subramaniam

== The Atelier ==
In 2005 the Festival asked the Cinéfondation to develop the Atelier (French: L'Atelier) with the aim of putting young filmmakers in touch with industry professionals. Each year the programme helps around twenty filmmakers gain international financing, meet producers, distributors and take part in the everyday life of the Festival.
