= 22nd Santiago International Film Festival =

2025 film festival

- Official poster.
- Opening film: The Man I Love
- Closing film: The Sentence
- Location: Santiago, Chile
- Awards: Best Film: Narciso; Best Chilean Film: Monguen
- Directors: Carlos Núñez
- Festival date: November 2–8, 2025

Santiago International Film Festival
- 2026 2025

The 22nd Santiago International Film Festival (SANFIC), organized by Fundación CorpArtes, took place from November 2 to 8, 2026. Ira Sachs's drama film The Man I Love served as the opening film for the festival, while Miguel del Arco's drama The Sentence closed the festival.

Paraguayan drama film Narciso, directed by Marcelo Martinessi, won Best Film, while Chilean documentary Monguén, directed by Antonio Caro, won Best Chilean Film.

== Background ==
The complete lineup was announced in October 2026. The festival date was changed from its usual date in August to November in an effort to include films screened in festivals during the second semester of the year.

Chilean actress Antonia Zegers received the Lifetime Achievement Award during the opening ceremony, where Chilean producer Juan de Dios Larraín was also honored with an award from SANFIC Industria for his contributions to Ibero-American cinema. Mexican actor Diego Luna was announced as the international guest for the festival and was expected to present his film Ashes, though he could not attend to the festival due to scheduling conflicts.

The festival was directed by Carlos Núñez. Screenings took place at four venues: Sala Centro Arte Alameda, Cinépolis Parque Arauco, Cinépolis La Reina and Sala Nemesio, with additional screening of films from the SANFIC Educa section held in different regions of Chile. During the closing ceremony, a special tribute was presented in honor of Chilean filmmaker Sebastián Lelio, who passed away on November 6.

== Official selections ==
The following films were selected for the official competitions and other sections:

=== International Film Competition ===
Highlighted title indicates section's best film winner.

English title	Original title	Director(s)	Production countrie(s)
A Happy Family		Jan-Eric Mack	Switzerland
Relict	Relicto	Guillermo Quintero	Colombia, France
A Balcony in Limoges	Un balcon à Limoges	Jérôme Reybaud	France
Narciso		Marcelo Martinessi	Paraguay, Brazil, Portugal, Germany, Spain, France, Uruguay
Coward		Lukas Dhont	Belgium, France, Netherlands
Hysteria		Mehmet Akif Büyükatalay	Germany
Dance of the Living	La lucha	José Alayón	Spain, Colombia
Ashes	Ceniza en la boca	Diego Luna	Mexico, Spain
Love is the Monster	Amor es el monstruo	Neto Villalobos Brenes	Costa Rica, Peru, Panama, Chile, Mexico

=== Chilean Film Competition ===
Highlighted title indicates section's best film winner.

English title	Original title	Director(s)	Production countrie(s)
Latir		Patricio Loutit Azócar	Chile
Población flotante		Carlos Araya Díaz	Chile
El trigre del este		Jorge Acevedo Carrasco	Chile, Mexico
Bloques erráticos		Thomas Woodroffe	Chile, France, Argentina
Cuadro negro		Carolina Adriazola, José Luis Sepúlveda	Chile
Rebelión interior		Sofía Gómez Vergara	Chile
La muerte te vio volver		Sebastián Cuevas Barría	Chile, France
Monguen		Antonio Caro	Chile
Animales		Andrés Waissblush	Chile, Argentina

=== Chilean Short Film Competition ===
Highlighted title indicates section's best film winner.

English title	Original title	Director(s)	Production countrie(s)
Grietas atraviesan estre vidrio multicolor		Francisca Ponce González	Chile
Terra		Amadis T. Loyer	Chile, Brazil
Réplica		Valentina Reyes Villarroel	Chile, Mexico
Ruidos molestos		Felipe Salinas Kraljevic	Chile
El final de los tiempos		Mao Osorio, Ismael Morales	Chile
Retrato de una memoria		Constanza Cerpa Vargas	Chile
Domingo		Nathalie Kozak	Chile
Que no te alcancen los lobos		Josefa Berenguela Araya	Chile
Cuando el sol se apague		Macarena Farías, Matilda Solar	Chile
Reina de puerto		Ariel Amor	Chile
El destello de las lágrimas		Ignacio Gómez Prado	Chile
La culpa es del cine		Eduardo Rivera Aburto	Chile
El vuelo de los cóndores		Aukaleb Ankaro	Chile
A la orilla de los recuerdos		Manuel Hoppe González	Chile
Humedal		Rossana Castillo Méndez	Chile
Lejanía		Daniel Velásquez Patarroyo	Chile, Colombia
El viento gritó tu nombre		Katalina Urrutia López	Chile
#Unboxing		Edo García	Chile, Spain
El llamado		Peter McPhee	Chile
Angélica		Dante Arroyo González	Chile
La ciudad de los dioses		Sebastián Claro	Chile

=== Masters of Cinema ===
The following films were selected for the Masters of Cinema (Maestros del Cine) section, dedicated to films by prestigious filmmakers from around the world:

English title	Original title	Director(s)	Production countrie(s)
Minotaur	Минотавр	Andrey Zvyagintsev	France, Germany, Latvia
Duse		Pietro Marcello	Italy, France
Silent Friend	Stille Freundin	Ildikó Enyedi	Germany, France, Hungary
Fjord		Cristian Mungiu	Romania, France, Norway, Sweden, Denmark
The Man I Love (opening film)		Ira Sachs	United States, France
The Fence	Le Cri des gardes	Claire Denis	France
The Stranger	L'Étranger	François Ozon	France, Belgium, Morocco
Paper Tiger		James Gray	United States

=== Visions of the World ===
The following films were selected for the Visions of the World (Visiones del Mundo) section, dedicated to feature films and documentaries from around the world:

English title	Original title	Director(s)	Production countrie(s)
A Useful Ghost	ผีใช้ได้ค่ะ	Ratchapoom Boonbunchachoke	Thailand, France, Singapore, Germany
The Great Arch	L'Inconnu de la Grande Arche	Stéphane Demoustier	France
Bailando solo		Gilberto González Penilla	Mexico
Rumor		Joana Nin	Brazil
The Righteous	Los justos	Jorge A. Lara, Fer Pérez	Spain
Un reino imaginado		Belén Abarza, Eduardo Bunster	Chile, Spain
Recuerdo tu nombre		Silvia Venegas	Spain
Mi nueva forma de ver		Lucía Gaviglio Salkind, Andrés Varela	Uruguay, Netherlands
Viajero inmóvil		Fernando Lavanderos, Sebastián Pereira	Chile

=== Directors in Focus ===
The following films were selected for the Directors in Focus (Directoras en Foco) section, dedicated to films made by female filmmakers from around the world:

English title	Original title	Director(s)	Production countrie(s)
Wilma will mehr		Maren Kea Freese	Germany
El vuelo de la cigüeña		Soumaya Hidalgo, Berta Vicente Salas	Spain, Brazil, Qatar
Sagrado		Alice Riff	Brazil
El lugar de la ausencia		María Luisa Ernst	United States, Bolivia, Chile, Mexico

=== Special Screenings ===
English title	Original title	Director(s)	Production countrie(s)
Winnipeg, the Seed of Hope	Winnipeg, el barco de la esperanza	Beñat Beitia, Elio Quiroga	Spain, Chile, Argentina
El cuerpo como tiempo		Patricia Rivadeneira	Chile
Historias sobrenaturales		Mauricio Corco	Chile
The Sentence (closing film)	Los relatos	Miguel del Arco	Spain

=== Retrospective ===
English title	Original title	Director(s)	Production countrie(s)
A Fantastic Woman (2018)	Una mujer fantástica	Sebastián Lelio	Chile, Germany, Spain
Post Mortem (2010)		Pablo Larraín	Chile, Mexico, Germany
The Punishment (2022)	El castigo	Matías Bize	Chile, Argentina
The Club (2015)	El club	Pablo Larraín	Chile
Los perros (2017)		Marcela Said	Chile, France, Argentina, Germany, Portugal

=== SANFIC Educa ===
The following films were selected for the SANFIC Educa, dedicated to fiction, documentary and animation films with themes related to children, youth and families:

English title	Original title	Director(s)	Production countrie(s)
La pena no duerme de noche		Martín André, Josefina Montino	Chile
Checker Tobi and the Journey to the Flying Rivers	Checker Tobi und die Reise zu den fliegenden Flüssen	Johannes Honsell	Germany
Mum Don't Love Me No Mo'		Grégory Lucilly	France
Auxiliary	Auxiliaire	Lucas Bacle	France
Capybaras	Los carpinchos	Alfredo Soderguit	France, Uruguay, Chile
El oficio divino		Lorena Lisotti	Mexico
Dalia and the Red Book	Dalia y el libro rojo	David Bisbano	Peru, Spain, Brazil, Colombia, Ecuador
Shadows		Rand Beiruty	France, Jordan
Secreto de cabeza		Matía Lorenzo	Chile
Winners	Sieger sein	Soleen Yusef	Germany
Cuando sea grande		Pamela López	Mexico
Mon inseparable		Anne-Sophie Bailly	France
El festín de las bestias		Simón Bucher, Claudia Saldivia, Amanda Rivera	Chile
German Animations		Nazgol Emani, Falk Schuster, Elena Walf, Antje Heyn	Germany
My Little Girl	Allez ma fille	Chloé Jouannet	France
Circus Boy	Zirkuskind	Anna Koch, Julia Lemke	Germany
Lulina and the Moon	Lulina e a lua	Alois Di Leo, Marcus Vinicius Vasconcelos	Grazil
Petra y el sol		Malu Furche, Stefania Malacchini	Chile

== Awards ==
The following awards were presented:

=== International Film Competition ===
- Best Film: Narciso by Marcelo Martinessi
- Best Director: Lukas Dhont for Coward
  - Special Mention for Best Director: Diego Luna for Ashes
- Best Performance: Paulina García for Amor es el monstruo
  - Special Mention for Best Performance: Emmanuel Macchia and Valentin Campagne for Coward

=== Chilean Film Competition ===
- Best Film: Monguen by Antonio Caro
- Best Director: Thomas Woodroffe for Bloques erráticos
- Best Performance: Sofía Paloma Gómez for Cuadro negro

=== Chilean Short Film Competition ===
- Best Short Film: Reina de puerto by Ariel Amor
  - Special Mention for Best Short Film: Ruidos molestos by Felipe Salinas Kraljevic
  - Special Mention for Best Short Film: Que no te alcancen los lobos by Josefa Berenguela Araya

=== Audience Award ===
- SANFIC22 Audience Award: Latir by Patricio Loutit
