= Knokke Off =

2023 Belgian-Dutch drama television series

- Created by: Anthony Van Biervliet
- Written by: Luk Wyns (S1-3), Nele Vandael (S1), Anthony Van Biervliet (S3)
- Directed by: Tom Goris (S1), Laura Van Haecke (S2), Anthony Schatteman (S3)
- Countries of origin: Belgium; Netherlands
- Original language: Dutch
- No. of seasons: 3
- No. of episodes: 26

Production
- Producers: Anthony Van Biervliet, Angela Pruijssers, Willem Pruijssers
- Cinematography: Tom Bonroy, Pieter Van Alphen
- Running time: 35 min
- Production company: Dingie

Original release
- Network: VRT 1
- Release: 12 May 2023

Knokke Off (High Tides) is a Belgian fictional television series created by Anthony Van Biervliet that first aired in 2023. It tells the story of a group of young people and their parents who spend their summer in the Belgian coastal town of Knokke.

The show is a Flemish-Dutch coproduction. It was first made available in Belgium on the public broadcaster VRT's streaming platform VRT MAX and in the Netherlands on Netflix. Knokke Off was highly successful, drawing a large viewership in both countries.

Internationally, the series is also known as High Tides. A second season was announced in December 2023 and released on 21 March 2025. The third season was released on 3 April 2026 on VRT MAX.

== Synopsis ==
A young couple in their early twenties, Louise Basteyns (Pommelien Thijs) and Alexandre "Alex" Vandael (Willem De Schryver), experience a carefree summer with their friends in the chic town of Knokke on the Belgian coast. Despite their opulent lifestyle and extravagant parties, the pressure from their wealthy families to meet high expectations looms over them.

As the summer unfolds, the facade begins to crack for everyone involved. Louise grapples with her bipolar disorder, questioning the necessity of the mood-regulating pills she takes. Alex, often short-tempered, wrestles with his own demons, determined not to follow in his father Patrick's (Geert Van Rampelberg) footsteps after his affair with his wife Eleanore (Ruth Bequaert)'s, best friend Christine (Jasmine Sendar). Christine owns an art gallery and is mother to Margaux (Ayana Doucouré) who is Louise's friend. Knokke, a fashionable coastal town, reveals itself to be a snake's nest of hidden secrets.

Into this tumultuous world enters Daan (Eliyha Altena) and his mother Melissa (Anna Drijver) from the Dutch city of Breda. Spending their summer near Knokke in Cadzand, their presence turns everything upside down. The search for truth intensifies as the masks worn by everyone begin to unravel.

== Episodes ==
No. overall	No. in season	Title	Directed by	Written by	Original release date
1	1	"Welcome to Knokke, bitch!"	Tom Goris	Luk Wyns, Nele Vandael	12 May 2023
Daan and his mother Melissa spend their summer in Knokke. Daan meets Alex and his entourage, including Louise. Meanwhile, Alex's father Patrick does more than just buy a valuable painting.
2	2	"Wil je ook eens proeven?"	Tom Goris	Luk Wyns, Nele Vandael	12 May 2023
Melissa finds a job as a nanny in Knokke. Daan gets to know Louise better. At a party at the beach club, Alex goes over the top.
3	3	"Wie bij de hond slaapt"	Tom Goris	Luk Wyns, Nele Vandael	12 May 2023
Eleonore suspects new nanny Melissa of theft. Angelique and Emilie are busy preparing for the wedding. When Alex seeks his limits with the speedboat, things go completely wrong.
4	4	"Ik heb een fucking goed idee"	Tom Goris	Luk Wyns, Nele Vandael	19 May 2023
Daan takes Louise to his campsite. While Eleonore and Patrick are out of the house, Alex tries to take revenge on his father.
5	5	"Home sweet home"	Tom Goris	Luk Wyns, Nele Vandael	26 May 2023
Eleonore discovers the damage Alex has done. Alex is working full time for The Crazy Lulu and has little time for other things. Daan takes Louise to his childhood home in Breda.
6	6	"Ik ruik naar seks"	Tom Goris	Luk Wyns, Nele Vandael	2 June 2023
Daan confronts his mother and tells what he knows from Louise about Claudia. Louise and Daan do their best to hide their affair from Alex, who is preparing in full for the opening of his club. Meanwhile, Patrick is back from Dubai and learns that Alex has fulfilled his project.
7	7	"The big bad wolf"	Tom Goris	Luk Wyns, Nele Vandael	9 June 2023
Alex confronts Daan and Louise separately about their affair. Eleonore becomes increasingly comfortable with Melissa. Louise organises a bachelor party for her sister Emilie.
8	8	"Da's tenminste een brave"	Tom Goris	Luk Wyns, Nele Vandael	16 June 2023
Alex realises he has neglected Louise and promises to make amends. Daan misses her greatly and wants to see her as soon as possible. Angelique and Jan seek a solution for their daughter.
9	9	"Ze weten het"	Tom Goris	Luk Wyns, Nele Vandael	23 June 2023
Alex struggles with panic attacks. Eleonore confronts Melissa about her bond with Claudia. Meanwhile, Emilie has changed her mind about the wedding. Patrick pays a visit to Jacques' beach club.
10	10	"Op de liefde?"	Tom Goris	Luk Wyns, Nele Vandael	30 June 2023
Daan is completely upset when he finds Jacques at the beach club. Eleonore organises a surprise party for Patrick. Alex struggles with the truth.

== Cast ==
- Pommelien Thijs as Louise Basteyns
- Willem De Schryver as Alexander Vandael
- Eliyha Altena as Daan
- Manouk Pluis as Anouk
- Ayana Doucouré as Margaux
- Kes Bakker as Matti
- Jef Hellemans as Victor
- Emma Moortgat as Emilie Basteyns
- Anna Drijver as Melissa
- Ruth Becquart as Eleonore
- Geert Van Rampelberg as Patrick Vandael
- Ini Massez as Angelique
- Pieter Genard as Jan Basteyns
- Jasmine Sendar as Christine
- Gene Bervoets as Jacques
- Felicia van Remoortel as Olivia
- Pierre Gervais as Charles

== Production and distribution ==
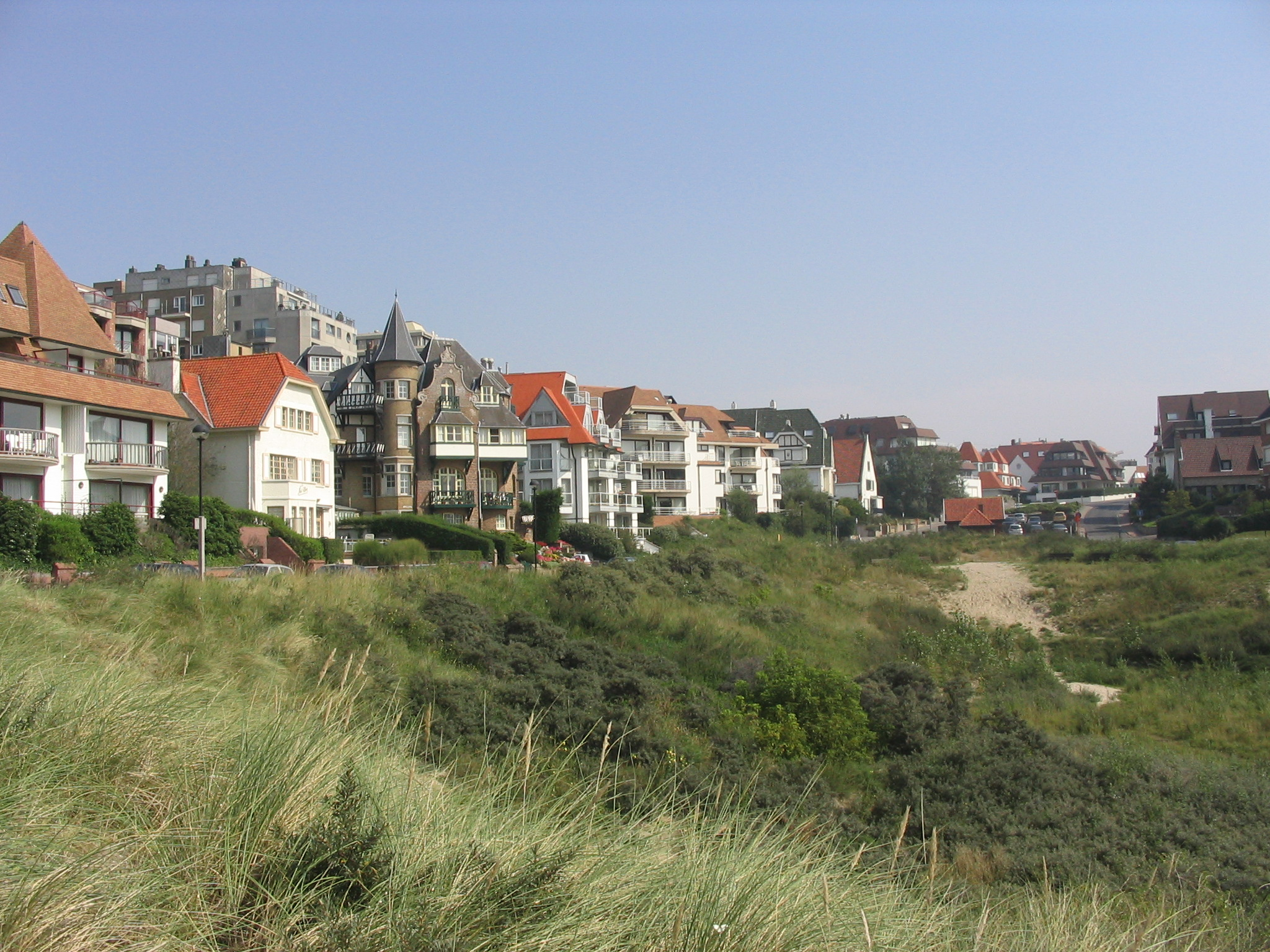
The show was largely filmed in the title town of Knokke.

Knokke Off is a co-production between the Flemish production company Dingie for the Flemish public television station VRT and the streaming service Netflix. The series was created in collaboration with the Dutch film distributor Dutch FilmWorks and with the support of the Flemish film fund Screen Flanders, the municipality of Knokke-Heist and the tax relief measures of the Belgian government ("Belgian Tax Shelter").

Filming took place in the summer of 2022, mainly in Knokke.

The series was shown on the Belgian online platform VRT MAX from May 12, 2023, before it was broadcast every week on the Flemish channel VRT 1 from August 3. In the Netherlands, the series was available on Netflix from July 19.

On 7 December 2023, Netflix made the series available in the rest of the world under the title High Tides.

In December 2023, VRT announced that the filming of a second season would take place in summer 2024 and that new characters would be added. Season 3 is available on VRT MAX since 3 April 2026.

== Reception ==
=== Critical reception ===
The series was generally well received by critics. Stefan Werbrouck of the Flemish magazine HUMO wrote that Knokke Off was "more exciting, more daring, and simply better than all other fictional works of VRT that spring". Elmo Lê Van of the newspaper De Morgen particularly highlighted the performances of the actors Pommelien Thijs ("Louise") and Willem De Schryver ("Alex") and stated that the series is "fast-paced, fascinating, simply excellent." He continued saying that despite the overarching theme that those with money and status are invariably among the winners, the screenwriters did not make cheap attacks on the rich because life would also "hold shitty moments for those ready, who hang a cashmere sweater around their shoulders."

Elien Valcke of the Belgian website Geekster praised the series in the highest tones, especially the screenplay, the acting performances of the main actors, the soundtrack and also the choice of filming locations, stating that Knokke would at times look like an exotic destination and not like the ordinary Belgian coast. Ruben Praster of the Dutch entertainment magazine Veronica Superguide found Knokke Off to be "easy to swallow", but that it takes a while to get going. Especially the tension between Alex and his father "lack any subtlety and seem to come straight from a soap opera". He continues that the series does not capture the viewer immediately, but one would want to know how it will proceed.

Marc Reynebeau of the newspaper De Standaard, on the other hand, found Knokke Off "absolutely unbelievable". He commented that the characters are one-dimensional, the plots too jerky, and that the secondary characters come and go without internal logic. Omar Larabi of the Dutch public television association BNNVARA regretted that the scriptwriters would often resort to clichés and never really make life at the bottom of the social ladder tangible. He criticised the series for being just one more show focusing on the life of rich youth.

At the end of November 2023, the series had a score of 3.38 out of 5 stars on the Dutch platform moviemeter.nl, with 65 votes. In the Internet Movie Database (IMDb), the series held an average rating of 7.6 out of 10 from over 1,500 individual ratings.

In December 2023, Knokke Off was one of 10 programmes nominated for the Flemish television award "De HA! van Humo". The readers of the same magazine also voted Knokke Off the "Best Series (National)" in "Humo's Pop Poll".

=== Viewership ===
The series was a huge success. Although it was initially only available exclusively on the online portal VRT MAX, the 10 episodes were viewed more than seven million times in the first four months. Half of those clicks came from the 13 to 34-year-old target group, which is generally harder to reach.

When Knokke Off was broadcast on television, the first two episodes were watched by half a million viewers live and an additional 400,000 people time-shifted.

The series was also successful in the Netherlands and was the most-watched series on Netflix.

Outside of Belgium and the Netherlands, Knokke Off or High Tides was in the global Top 5 of the most streamed Netflix shows in a language other than English in December 2023. It took the second spot in Spain, Uruguay, Argentina and Germany, the third spot in Austria and the fourth spot in Switzerland.
