= Ashes (2026 film) =

- Spanish theatrical release poster
- Spanish: Ceniza en la boca
- Directed by: Diego Luna
- Screenplay by: Abia Castillo; Diego Rabasa; Diego Luna
- Based on: Ceniza en la boca by Brenda Navarro
- Produced by: Inna Payán; Valérie Delpierre; Diego Rabasa; Luis Salinas; Diego Luna
- Starring: Teresa Lozano; Anna Diaz; Adriana Paz
- Cinematography: Damián García
- Edited by: Sofi Escudé
- Music by: Raquel García-Tomás
- Production companies: La Corriente del Golfo; Animal de Luz; Inicia Films; Perro Azul; EFD Studios
- Distributed by: Avalon (Spain)
- Release dates: 13 May 2026 (Cannes); 9 October 2026 (Spain); 5 November 2026 (Mexico)
- Running time: 98 minutes
- Countries: Mexico; Spain
- Language: Spanish

Ashes or A Mouthful of Ash (Spanish: Ceniza en la boca) is a 2026 drama film directed by Diego Luna, co-written with Abia Castillo and Diego Rabasa, and based on the same name novel by Brenda Navarro. A Mexican-Spanish co-production, its cast is led by Anna Díaz and Adriana Paz.

The film had its world premiere at the Special Screening section of the 79th Cannes Film Festival on 13 May 2026. It was released theatrically in Spain on 9 October 2026 by Avalon. The Mexican theatrical release is set for 5 November 2026.

== Plot ==
21-year-old Lucila moves to Spain with her brother Diego to reunite with her mother Isabel, who settled there eight years prior.

== Cast ==
- Anna Díaz as Lucila
- Adriana Paz as Isabel
- Teresa Lozano as Laura
- Irene Escolar

== Production ==
Based on the novel Ceniza en la boca (2022) by Brenda Navarro, the screenplay was written by Diego Luna, Abia Castillo, and Diego Rabasa. The film is a Mexican and Spanish co-production by La Corriente del Golfo, Animal de Luz, Inicia Films, Perro Azul, and EFD Studios. Shooting locations in Madrid included the Mercado Maravillas. Shooting in Spain wrapped after five weeks of filming, moving to Mexico. Damián García worked as cinematographer.

== Release ==
Luxbox acquired world sales rights to the film ahead of its world premiere, which took place at the 'Special Screenings' section of the 2026 Cannes Film Festival. Netflix acquired rights to select Spanish speaking territories prior to the start of the festival. It was screened at the Coca-Cola Open Air Cinema at the 32nd Sarajevo Film Festival, in the Open Air section in August 2026.

The festival run also included selections for screenings in the 'Latin Horizons' section of the 74th San Sebastián International Film Festival, the official selection of the 24th Morelia International Film Festival, and the 'Progressive Cinema Competition - Visions for the World of Tomorrow' of the 21st Rome Film Festival.

Watermelon Pictures acquired theatrical distribution rights for North America. The film was released theatrically in Spain on 9 October 2026 by Avalon. It is scheduled to be released theatrically in Mexico on 5 November 2026.

== Reception ==
Tim Grierson of ScreenDaily deemed the film to be "a compassionate, clear-eyed study of a young woman searching for a place to call home".

Pete Hammond of Deadline assessed that considered Ashes as a "powerful and moving motion picture", with "strong guidance from Diego Luna".

David Rooney of The Hollywood Reporter lamented the "inert" film to be "pared back to the point of narrative starvation".

On review aggregator website Rotten Tomatoes, the film holds an approval rating of 79% based on 19 reviews, with an average score of rated reviews of 7.00/10.

== Accolades ==
Award	Date of ceremony	Category	Recipient(s)	Result	Ref.
Rome Film Festival	25 October 2026	Best Screenplay	Abia Castillo, Diego Rabasa, Diego Luna	Won	
Santiago International Film Festival	8 November 2026				
Santiago International Film Festival	8 November 2026	Special Mention for Best Director – International Competition	Diego Luna	Mentioned	

== See also ==
- List of Mexican films of 2026
- List of Spanish films of 2026
