= August De Schryver =

Belgian politician 1898–1991

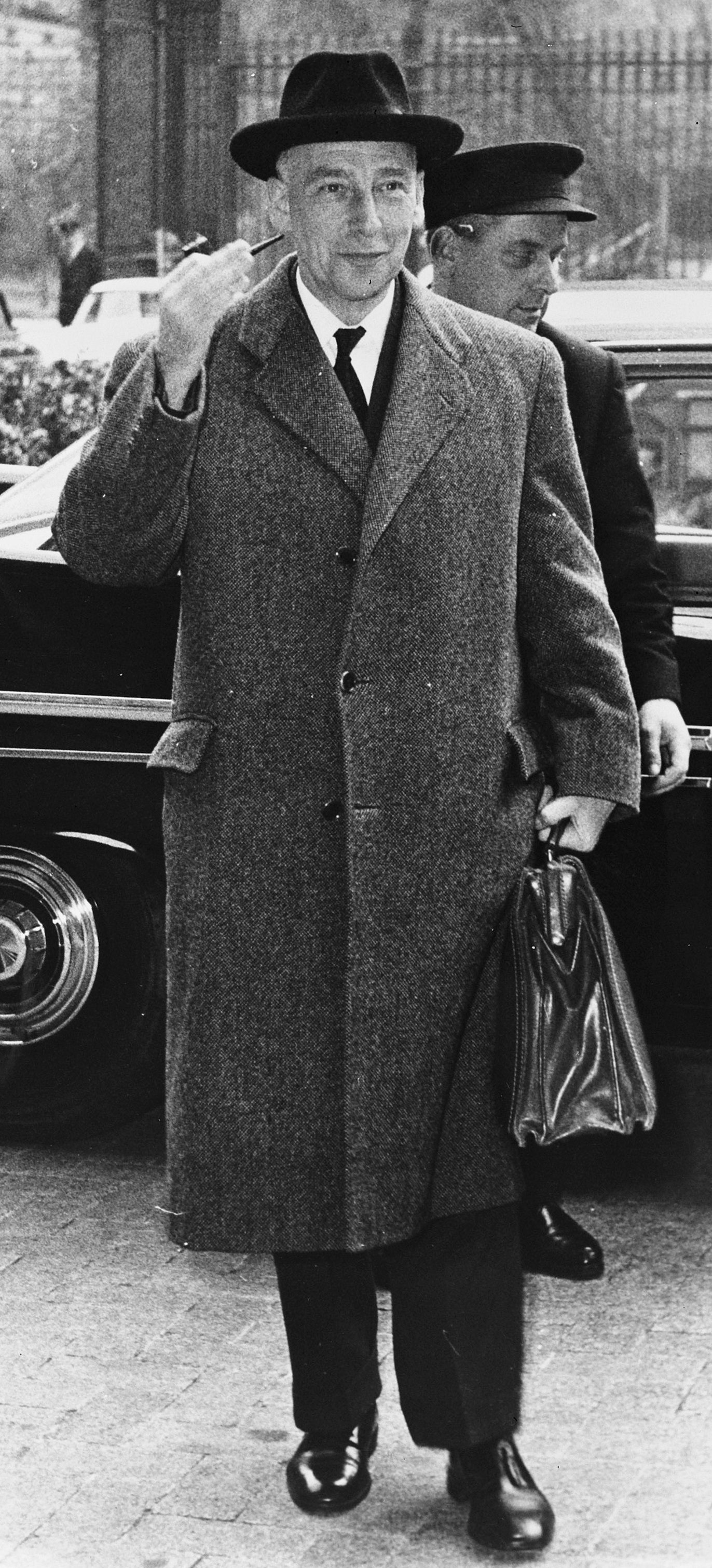
August de Schryver in 1959

August Edmond De Schryver (Note: De Schryver's first name is also rendered "Auguste" in French.) (Ghent, 16 May 1898 – 5 March 1991) was a Belgian politician. During the course of his political career, between 1935 and 1960, he held a number of ministerial portfolios within several successive governments including the Belgian government in exile during World War II. He was also President of the Christian Social Party between 1945 and 1949. As Minister of the Colonies until 1960, he presided over the independence of the Belgian Congo.

== Family ==
De Schryver belongs to a Roman Catholic family, son of August-Octaaf De Schryver (1848–1915). He studied at the St-Barbaracollege in Ghent. He became in 1916 a War volunteer and participated in the Battle of Oostrozebeke. He studied law after the war in the college of Henri Pirenne. He married on 03/02/1925 in Sint-Niklaas to Maria Josepha Adriana Scheerders the daughter of Leon Scheerders. The marriage was performed by Hendrik Heyman. They had 10 children.

Leon Scheerders- van Kerchove was founder-president of an important stone factory in Sint-Niklaas. After the death of his father-in-law he became president of the board. He was buried in Belsele in the family grave of his father-in-law.

His great-grandson is actor Willem De Schryver.

=== Theory of the Just Judges ===
In 2012 the press wrote that the descendants of August have The Just Judges, a stolen panel of a Van Eyck painting.

== Career ==
The young August was influenced by Canon Frans de Hovre, a famous prelate of the diocese that he did meet in 1919. In 1920 he founded a club for old comrades in Ghent, VOS, of the Great War. He became an important figure for the development of the Flemish culture. However, when the movement became too radical he resigned as president.

== Honours ==
- War Cross.
- Grand Officer in the Order of Leopold.
- knight Grand cross in the Order of the Crown.
- Officer in the Order of Leopold II.
- knight Grand cross in the Order of the White Rose of Finland.
- Grand Officer of the Order of the British Empire.
- Grand Officer of the Legion of Honour.

== Ministerial portfolios ==
- 1935–1936: Minister of Agriculture.
- 1936–1937: Minister of the Interior.
- 1939: Minister of Justice.
- 1940: Minister of Economic Affairs.
- 1940–1944: Minister of Agriculture.
- 1944–1945: Minister without Portfolio.
- 1959–1960: Minister of the Belgian Congo and Ruanda-Urundi.

== Bibliography ==
- De Schryver, August (1998). Oorlogsdagboeken, 1940–1942. Tielt: Lannoo. ISBN 978-90-209-2971-3.
