= Willem De Schryver =

Belgian actor (born 2001)

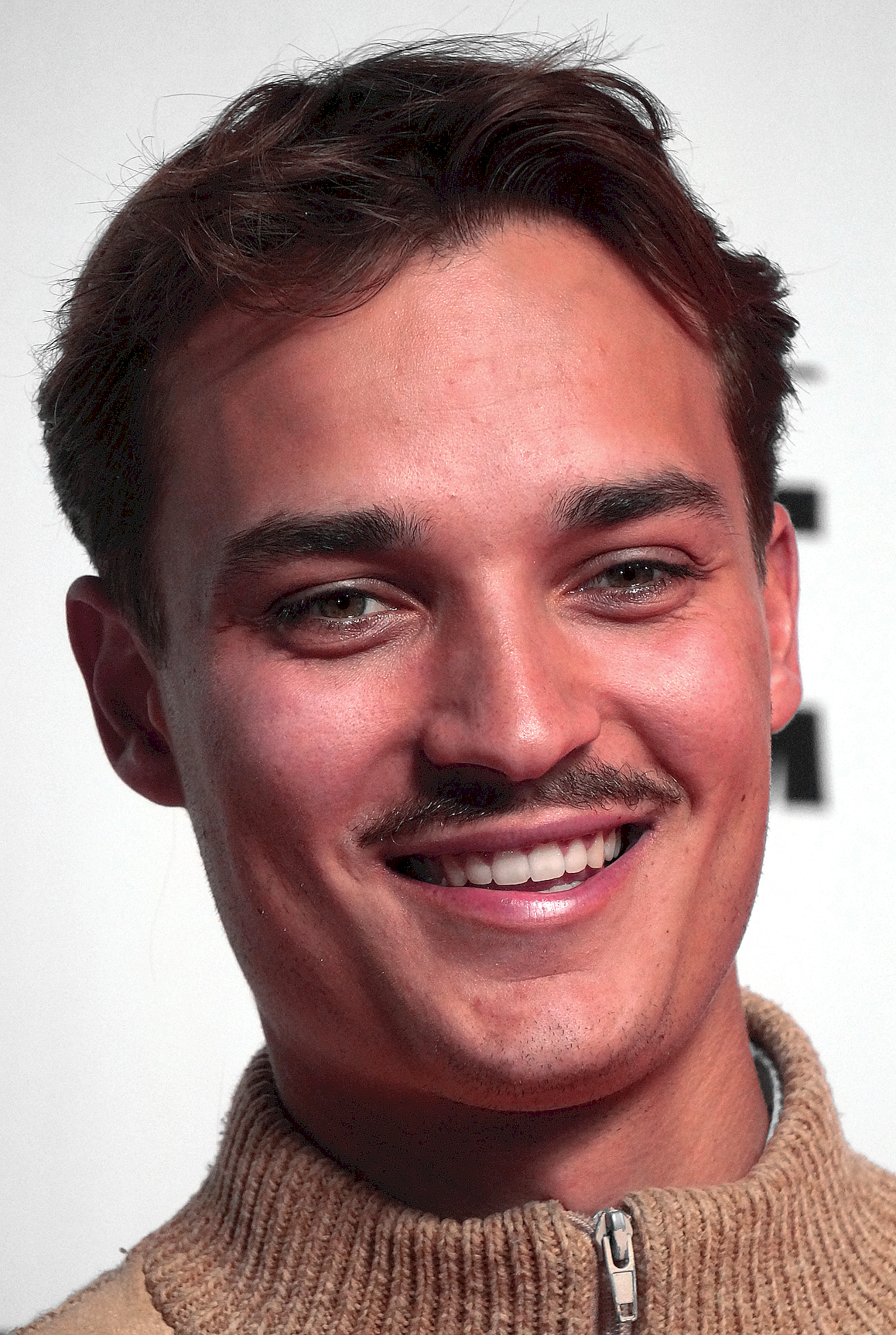
- Willem De Schryver in 2025
- Born: 2001 (age 24–25)
- Occupation: Actor
- Years active: 2019–present

Willem De Schryver (born in Tervuren, Belgium, 2001) is a Belgian actor. He studied at the Lemmensinstituut in Leuven as well as the Royal Academy of Fine Arts of Ghent.

== Personal life ==
Willem De Schryver's father is a lawyer, and his mother works with families of autistic children. His great-grandfather is August De Schryver, former Belgian minister and president of the Christian Social Party.

== Career ==
De Schryver made his television acting debut as Sander Driesen in the third season of wtFOCK, the Flemish adaptation of Skam. He is most known for his acting in Knokke Off opposite Pommelien Thijs. His feature film debut was in Lukas Dhont's Coward.

In 2026, he was nominated for Best Acting Performance for a Lead Role in a Fiction Series for his performance in De Big Fuck-up at the 16th Ensor Awards.

== Filmography ==
=== TV series ===
Title	Role	Year
wtFOCK	Sander Driesen	2019–2021
Déjà Vu	Max	2021
Knokke Off	Alexander Vandael	2023–2026
Interview met de Geschiedenis	young King Baudouin	2023
Assisen: De insulinemoord	Stan Laeremans	2024
De Expeditie: Namibië	himself	2025
De Big Fuck-up	Jan Laureys	2025

=== Films ===
Title	Role	Year
Ondergronds		2023
Coward	Jacobs	2026

== Awards and nominations ==
Award	Ceremony date	Category	Work	Result	Reference
Ensor Award	7 February 2026	Best Actor in a Leading Role (Fiction Series)	De Big Fuck-up	Nominated	
