= Manouk Pluis =

Dutch actress (born 1999)

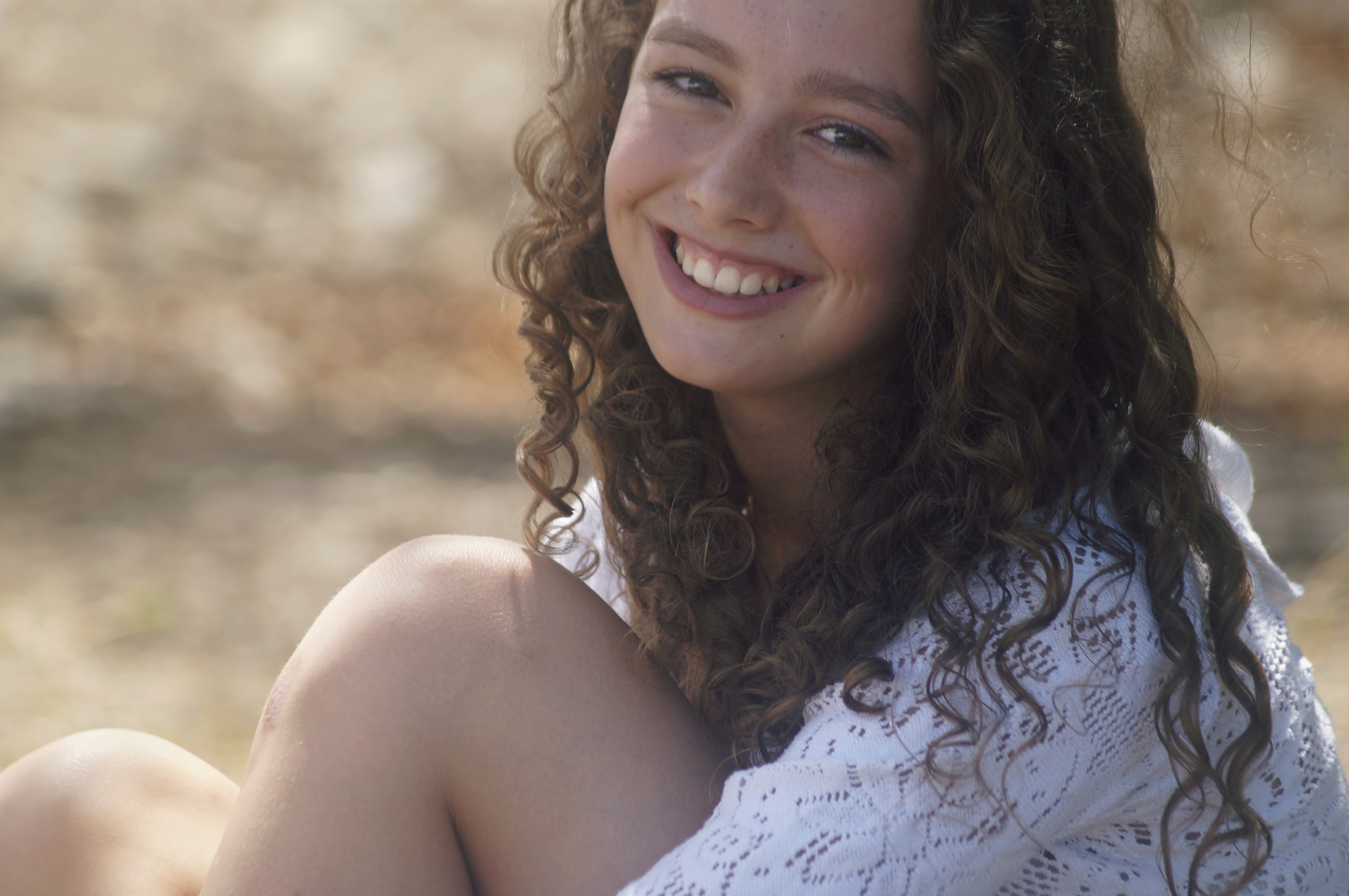
- Pluis in 2014
- Born: 20 August 1999 (age 26); Bunde, Limburg, Netherlands
- Occupations: Actress; presenter; dancer
- Years active: 2008–present

Manouk Pluis (born 20 august 1999) is a Dutch actress, presenter and dancer.

== Early life and career ==
Pluis won the provincial song contest in 2008, at the age of 8. That same year she got her first role as Cootje in Ciske de Rat. In the 2009/2010 theater season, she played Brigitta in The Sound of Music. In 2011, she won the Kinger Vastelaovend Leedjesfestival. She was then seen as fairy Aloé in Droomvlucht at the Efteling Theatre. In the 2012/2013 season she was Nelly in Dik Trom. In 2013, she was asked to play a role in the short film Soldaat Wojtek, directed by Dick van den Heuvel. In 2013 she returned to the Efteling to play frog princess Anura in De sprookjesmusical Klaas Vaak. She shared this role with Vajèn van den Bosch and Venna van den Bosch. In the 2014/2015 season she played Zoë, a 14-year-old adolescent, in the Kinderen voor Kinderen musical Waanzinnig Gedroomd. In 2015 she participated in AVRO Junior Dance and came fourth in the final. She then played a part in the fairytale musical Pinokkio. In 2016, she landed a lead role in the Disney television series Jonge Garde, which aired on Disney Channel. In this series she portrays Noa. In 2017 she was asked to play a lead role in a 48h film project Coquille, for which she received the 'best actress award'. From 2018 to 2019 Pluis played the role of Bloem, one of the four leading roles in the AVROTROS TV series Forever.

== Personal life ==
From 2011 to 2016 Pluis followed the dance preparatory course at the Intensive Dance Academy (IDA) in Maastricht. Since 2017, she has been studying at the acting school Maastricht Academy of Dramatic Arts.

== Filmography ==
| Year | Title | Role | Notes |
|---|---|---|---|
| 2009 | Juliana Kinderziekenhuis | Eva | |
| 2013 | Soldaat Wojtek | Mila | Short film |
| 2015 | Tour de France | Latoya | Short film |
| 2016 | Jonge Garde | Noa | |
| 2017 | Opgepast! | Puck | |
| 2017 | Such a Perfect Day | Sophie | |
| 2017 | Coquille | Elvira Deuntjes | 48h short |
| 2018–2019 | Forever | Bloem | TV series |
| 2019 | Songerskop | Fenne | Short film |
| 2020 | Schijn Tijd | Gabrielle | Short film |
| 2021 | In Pieces | Eva | Short film |
| 2021 | Wall #4 | Manouk | Short film |
| 2021 | Het Verhaal van Nederland | Anne-Marie Huybrechts | TV series |
| 2023 | Knokke Off | Anouk | TV series |
