= Forever (Dutch TV series) =

2016 Dutch-language television series

- Genre: Youth series
- Directed by: David Cocheret; Timon Moll; Jan Pool
- Starring: Manouk Pluis; Koen van der Molen; Selin Akkulak; Yassine Kji; Hamza Othman
- Country of origin: Netherlands
- Original language: Dutch
- No. of seasons: 2
- No. of episodes: 141

Production
- Production company: Stepping Stone

Original release
- Network: AVROTROS; NPO Zapp
- Release: 19 February 2018 – 2019

Forever is a Dutch-language television series that was broadcast by AVROTROS on NPO Zapp. The series is a remake of the Belgian program 4eVeR and is about the lives of four friends Sal (portrayed by Yassine Kji in season 1 and by Hamza Othman in season 2), Dex (Koen van der Molen), Bloem (Manouk Pluis) and Noa (Selin Akkulak), who come from completely different families.

== Cast ==
Actor	Role	Season	Notes
Yassine Kji	Sal Massoud	1	
Hamza Othman	Sal Massoud	2	
Koen van der Molen	Dex Stuurman	1-2	
Manouk Pluis	Bloem de Bree	1-2	
Selin Akkulak	Noa de Wit	1-2	
Ghieslaine Guardiola	Cindy Sital	1-2	Mother od Noa
Davy Gomez	Juuls de Bree	1-2	Little brother of Bloem
Arian Foppen	Luuk de Bree	1-2	Father of Bloem and Juuls
Soraya de Bakker	Inge de Bree	1-2	Mother of Bloem and Juuls
Delaila Ramdedovic	Noor Massoud	1-2	Sister of Sal
Hassan el Rahaui	Farouk Massoud	1-2	Father of Sal and Noor, policeman
Mounira Hadj Mansour	Nadia Massoud	1-2	Mother of Sal and Noor
Rick Lens	Jesse	1-2	Foster brother of Dex
Cynthia de Graaff	Suus	1-2	Mother of Dex
Roscoe Leijen	Bart	1-2	Friend of Suus

== Release ==
Forever was released on February 19, 2018 on AVROTROS.
