= List of Mexican films of 2026 =

A list of Mexican-produced and co-produced feature films released or scheduled for release in Mexico in 2026. When applicable, the domestic theatrical release date is favoured.

== Films ==
Release		Title (Domestic title)	Cast & Crew	Distributor	Ref.
J A N U A R Y	8	Un hombre por semana	Director: Marco Polo Constandse, Ana de la Reguera Cast: Ana de la Reguera, Martín Altomaro, Roberto Quijano, José María de Tavira	Videocine	
J A N U A R Y	22	Familia a la deriva	Director: Alfonso Pineda Ulloa Cast: Mauricio Ochmann, Memo Villegas, Irán Castillo, Ana González Bello	Star Distribution	
F E B R U A R Y	12	Will You Be My Girlfriend? (¿Quieres ser mi novia?)	Director: Ihtzi Hurtado Cast: Ludwika Paleta, Juanpa Zurita	Videocine	
F E B R U A R Y	26	Venganza	Director: Rodrigo Valdés Cast: Omar Chaparro, Alejandro Speitzer, Paola Núñez, Gustavo Sánchez Parra, Luis Alberti, Natalia Solián	Cinépolis Distribución	
M A R C H	12	Socias por accidente	Director: Ihtzi Hurtado Cast: Angelique Boyer, Bárbara de Regil	Videocine	
M A R C H	19	Psicópata: El asesino del conejo blanco	Director: J. Xavier Velasco Cast: Adriana Llabrés, Andrés Almeida, Hoze Meléndez	Cinépolis Distribución	
A P R I L	16	Juana	Director: Daniel Giménez Cacho Cast: Diana Sedano, Margarita Sanz, Arturo Ríos, Antonio Fortier, Nailea Norvind, Ángeles Cruz	Talipot Studio	
A P R I L	23	The Devil Smokes (and Saves the Burnt Matches in the Same Box) (El Diablo Fuma (y guarda las cabezas de los cerillos quemados en la misma caja))	Director: Ernesto Martínez Bucio Cast: Mariapau Bravo Aviña, Rafael Nieto Martínez, Regina Alejandra, Donovan Said Martínez, Laura Uribe Rojas, Carmen Ramos, Bernardo Gamboa, Micaela Gramajo	Mandarina Cine	
M A Y	7	Deseo	Director: Teresa Simone Cast: Ludwika Paleta, Óscar Casas, José María Yazpik	Cinépolis Distribución	
M A Y	7	El ritual del nahual	Director: Carlos Matienzo Serment Cast: Gerardo Oñate, Alejandra Herrera, Gerardo Trejoluna, Caraly Sánchez	Cinemex Distribución	
J U N E	4	On the Road (En el camino)	Director: David Pablos Cast: Víctor Miguel Prieto, Osvaldo Sánchez	Cinépolis Distribución	
J U L Y	2	Flies (Moscas)	Director: Fernando Eimbcke Cast: Teresita Sánchez, Hugo Ramírez	Mubi	
J U L Y	23	Hasta el fin del mundo	Director: Emiliano Castro Vizcarra Cast: Aislinn Derbez, Mauricio Ochmann	Buena Vista International	
A U G U S T	14	Loco México mágico	Director: Carlos Santos Cast: Silverio Palacios, Fernando Cuautle, Sofía Carrera, Rocío Guzmán, Daniel Sosa	Cinepolis Distribución	
A U G U S T	20	Tus dos muertos	Director: Daniel Castro Zimbrón Cast: Gerardo Trejoluna, Juan Daniel García Treviño, Brontis Jodorowsky, Alexis Ayala, Camila Calónico, Myriam Bravo, Axel Shuarma	Piano Distribución	
S E P T E M B E R	3	El desaire	Director: Gabriel Ramos Cast: Vico Escorcia, Joshua Okamoto, Guillermo Alonso	Benuca Films	
S E P T E M B E R	10	El club del pie izquierdo	Director: Celso R. García Cast: Mónica Huarte, Adrián Uribe, María León, Mauricio Isaac	Sony Pictures México	
O C T O B E R	8	Un mal partido	Director: Salvador Espinosa Cast: Mauricio Ochmann, Loreto Peralta, José Antonio Toledano, Roberto Duarte, Sara Maldonado	Buena Vista International	
O C T O B E R	15	La isla de las muñecas	Director: Homero McDonald Chavéz Cast: Javier Ponce, Alejandro Tommasi, Isaura Espinoza	Navi RB Company	
O C T O B E R	22	Amarte	Director: Roberto Girault Facha Cast: Cassandra Sánchez Navarro, José María de Tavira, David Chocarro, Jesús Zavala	Corazón Films	
N O V E M B E R	5	Ashes (Ceniza en la boca)	Director: Diego Luna Cast: Anna Díaz, Adriana Paz, Teresa Lozano	—N/a	
