= Coward (2026 film) =

2026 film by Lukas Dhont

- International promotional poster
- Directed by: Lukas Dhont
- Written by: Lukas Dhont; Angelo Tijssens
- Produced by: Michiel Dhont; Juliette Schrameck
- Starring: Valentin Campagne; Emmanuel Macchia; Jef Jacobs; Willem De Schryver; Liam Jacqmin; Mistral Guidotti
- Cinematography: Frank van den Eeden
- Edited by: Alain Dessauvage
- Music by: Valentin Hadjadj
- Production companies: The Reunion; Versus Production; Topkapi Films; Lumen; France 2 Cinéma; VTM; RTBF; Proximus; BeTV; Orange
- Distributed by: Lumière (Belgium and Netherlands); Diaphana Distribution (France)
- Release dates: 21 May 2026 (Cannes); 21 October 2026 (Belgium); 18 November 2026 (France)
- Running time: 127 minutes
- Countries: Belgium; France; Netherlands
- Languages: French; Dutch

Coward is a 2026 war-drama film directed by Lukas Dhont, co-written with Angelo Tijssens. A co-production of Belgium, France, and the Netherlands, it stars Emmanuel Macchia (in his acting debut) and Valentin Campagne as Pierre and Francis, and follows a gay love story in the Belgian trench warfare front of World War I.

The film had its world premiere in the main competition of the 2026 Cannes Film Festival on 21 May, where Macchia and Campagne shared the prize for Best Actor. It was theatrically released in Belgium by Lumiére on 21 October, followed by its theatrical release in France by Diaphana on 18 November.

It was also selected as the Belgian entry for Best International Feature Film at the 99th Academy Awards.

== Premise ==
In 1916, during World War I, Pierre serves at the Belgian front alongside other comrades. Behind the trench warfare, the soldiers try to keep their spirits up. One day, Pierre meets flamboyant Francis. To counter the rhetoric of war and the omnipresent misery, the two decide, with their comrades, to put on a theatrical revue.

== Cast ==
- Emmanuel Macchia as Pierre
- Valentin Campagne as Francis
- Jef Jacobs as Jozef Stevens
- Willem De Schryver as Jacobs
- Liam Jacqmin as Blanckaert
- Mistral Guidotti as Gustaaf Cooreman
- Jonas Wertz as Jozef
- Boris Bouchat as Thomas
- Orlando Vauthier as Rik
- Tuur Verelst as Arthur
- Mathieu Carpentier as Sergeant Dubois M.
- Tijmen Van Damme as Ernst
- Emil Krastev as Émile
- Anaëlle Fournier as Mathilde
- Max Colonne as Robert
- Aaron Denolf as Nolf
- Jules Smekens

== Production ==
=== Development ===
The screenplay for Coward was developed over three years, with Dhont and co-writer Angelo Tijssens conducting historical research in archives including London's Imperial War Museums, along with sources in Belgium and France. The writers learned of male soldiers performing theater pieces on the front lines, cross-dressing, usually playing the roles of wives and mothers, discovering rare lasting romantic connections of closeted queer people.

Coward is co-produced by The Reunion, a Belgian production company founded in 2021 by Dhont and his brother Michiel Dhont, alongside Versus Production, Topkapi Films and producer Juliette Schrameck for Lumen. The project received multiple sources of public funding, including €500,000 from Eurimages and €200,000 from Screen Flanders. It was co-produced by France 2 Cinéma, Ciné+ OCS, VTM, RTBF, Proximus, BeTV and Orange.

=== Filming ===
Principal photography was scheduled to begin in September 2025, with filming taking place in Belgium and New York.

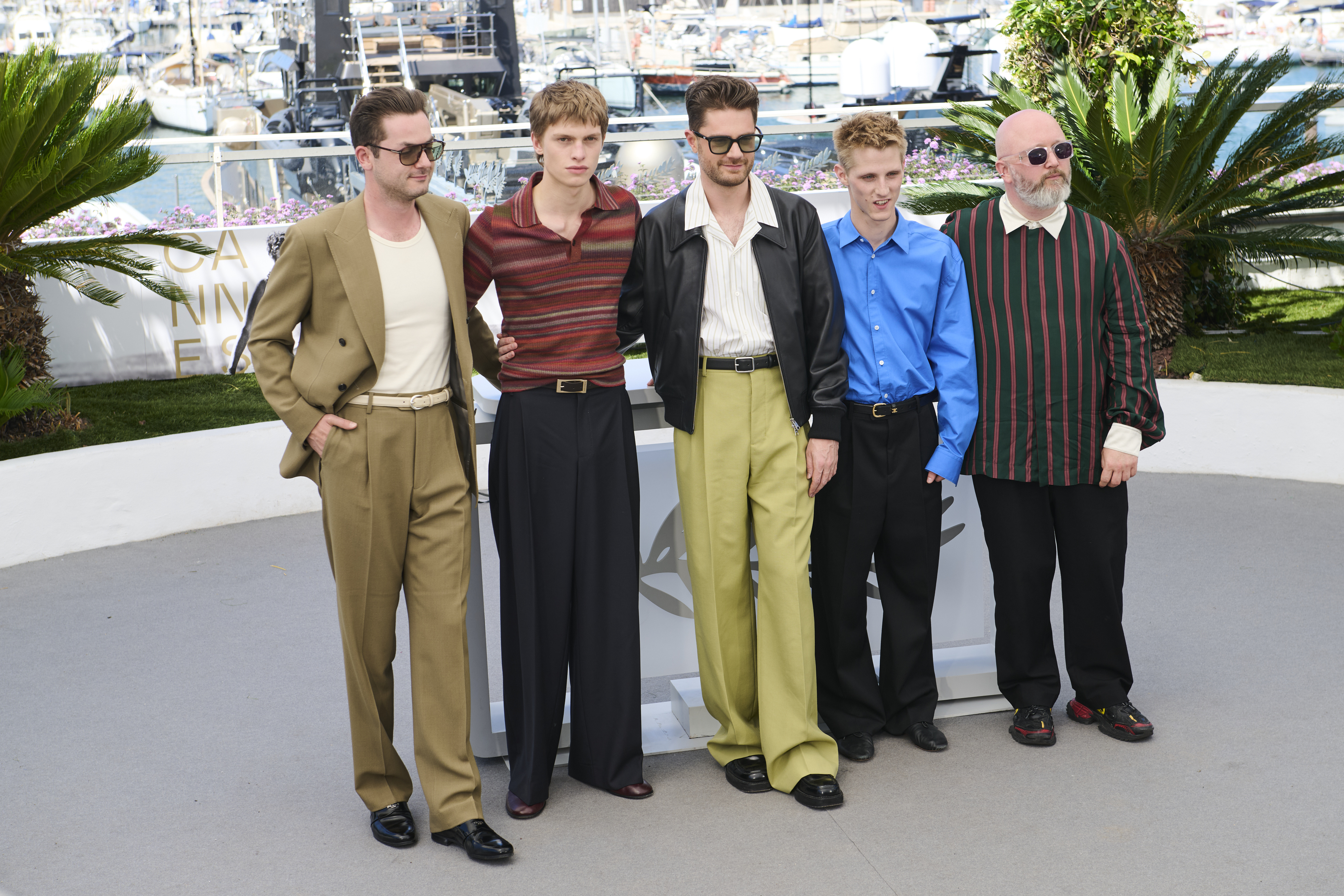
Michiel Dhont, Emmanuel Macchia, Lukas Dhont, Valentin Campagne, and Angelo Tijssens at the 79th Cannes Film Festival

== Release ==
The film had its world premiere at the main competition of the 79th Cannes Film Festival on 21 May 2026, marking Dhont's third feature film selected for the festival's official selection following Girl (2018) and Close (2022).

The Match Factory and Cologne will handle the world sales. In May 2026, Mubi acquired distribution rights to Coward for the United Kingdom, Ireland, Australia, New Zealand, Latin America, Germany, Austria, Italy, Spain and Turkey; Mubi previously distributed Dhont's 2022 film Close in several countries. Shortly after the film's Cannes premiere, Mubi also acquired rights to the film for North America.

It was screened in the Kinoscope section of the 32nd Sarajevo Film Festival in August 2026. It was also programmed in the 'Perlak' sidebar section of the 74th San Sebastián International Film Festival.

It was released theatrically in Belgium by Lumière on 21 October 2026, and in France by Diaphana Distribution (under the title Les Braves) on 18 November 2026.

It was also selected as the Belgian entry for Best International Feature Film at the 99th Academy Awards. It marks Dhont's second feature film submitted to represent the country, following Close (2022), which was nominated in the category.

== Reception ==
=== Critical response ===
On review aggregator website Rotten Tomatoes, the film holds an approval rating of 95% based on 40 reviews, with an average rating of 7.8/10. Metacritic, which uses a weighted average, assigned the film a score of 66 out of 100, based on 12 critics, indicating "generally favorable" reviews.

Nadia Dalimonte of Next Best Picture described Coward as a sensitively crafted work that examines shifting definitions of bravery and cowardice, ultimately offering a hopeful perspective on vulnerability and artistic expression amid war. Clotilde Chinnici of Loud and Clear concluded that Coward is a well-made film with a bold premise that offers an original perspective on war by focusing on those outside the battlefield who respond to its horror in non-combative ways.

=== Accolades ===
Award	Date of ceremony	Category	Recipient(s)	Result	Ref.
Cannes Film Festival	23 May 2026	Palme d'Or	Lukas Dhont	Nominated	
Cannes Film Festival	23 May 2026	Best Actor	Emmanuel Macchia and Valentin Campagne	Won	
Cannes Film Festival	23 May 2026	Positive Cinema Prize	Lukas Dhont	Won	
Santiago International Film Festival	8 November 2026	Best Film – International Competition	Lukas Dhont	Nominated	
Santiago International Film Festival	8 November 2026	Best Director – International Competition	Lukas Dhont	Won	
Santiago International Film Festival	8 November 2026	Special Mention for Best Performance – International Competition	Emmanuel Macchia and Valentin Campagne	Won	
Seville European Film Festival	14 November 2026	Public Choice Award for Best Film in the EFA Section	Coward	Won	
European Film Awards	16 January 2027	Best European Cinematographer	Frank van den Eeden	Pending	
European Film Awards	16 January 2027	Best European Make-Up & Hair Artist	Evalotte Oosterop, Pierre Olivier Persin	Pending	

== See also ==
- List of submissions to the 99th Academy Awards for Best International Feature Film
- List of Belgian submissions for the Academy Award for Best International Feature Film
