= Narciso (film) =

2026 drama film by Marcelo Martinessi

- Paraguayan promotional poster
- Directed by: Marcelo Martinessi
- Written by: Marcelo Martinessi
- Produced by: Sebastián Peña-Escobar; Marcelo Martinessi
- Starring: Diro Romero; Manuel Cuenca; Arturo Fleitas; Margarita Irún; Mona Martínez; Nahuel Pérez Biscayart
- Cinematography: Luis Arteaga
- Edited by: Fernando Epstein; Marcelo Martinessi
- Music by: Zeltia Montes
- Production company: La Babosa Cine
- Distributed by: BTeam Pictures (Spain)
- Release dates: 17 February 2026 (Berlinale); 2 October 2026 (Spain)
- Running time: 102 minutes
- Countries: Paraguay; Brazil; Portugal; Germany; Spain; France; Uruguay
- Languages: Spanish; Guarani

Narciso is a 2026 drama film written, produced, edited and directed Marcelo Martinessi. A co-production of Paraguay, Brazil, Portugal, Germany, Spain, France, and Uruguay, it stars Diro Romero, Manuel Cuenca, Arturo Fleitas, Margarita Irún, Mona Martínez and Nahuel Pérez Biscayart.

The film had its world premiere in the Panorama section of the 76th Berlin International Film Festival on 17 February 2026, where it won the FIPRESCI Prize for Best Film. It was selected as the Paraguayan entry for the Best International Feature Film at the 99th Academy Awards.

== Premise ==
Set in 1958, a Paraguayan rock star is found dead at the height of his career. The film is based on historical events including the 1959 murder of radio host Bernardo Aranda and the subsequent persecution of homosexual men under the Stroessner regime. The film is based on the eponymous novel Narciso, written by the Paraguayan author Guido Rodríguez Alcalá and published in Asunción in 2016.

== Cast ==
- Diro Romero as Narciso
- Manuel Cuenca as Lulu
- Arturo Fleitas as Dracula
- Margarita Irún as Goya
- Mona Martínez as Nenucha
- Nahuel Pérez Biscayart as Mr. Wesson

== Production ==
A Paraguayan-Brazilian-Portuguese-German-Spanish-French-Uruguayan international co-production. Development began in September 2020, it was reported that Luxbox Films would acquire the international sales of Marcelo Martinessi's then-upcoming film. Martinessi also re-teamed with the companies who produced his previous film, The Heiresses (2018), including Germany's Pandora Filmproduktions and French production company La Fábrica Nocturna Prods. The project participated at the Industry section of the 2020 San Sebastián International Film Festival. It won the DALE! Award and received $23,230 production grant. It was presented at the 2021 Berlinale Co-Production Market and won the ArteKino International Prize. In March 2023, it was announced that Spain's Bteam Prods, Portuguese production company Oublaum, Brazilian company Esquina Films, and Uruguay's Mutante Cine would co-produce the film.

Principal photography took place entirely in Asunción. It began in March and wrapped in April 2024.

== Release ==
Narciso had its world premiere at the Panorama section of the 76th Berlin International Film Festival on 17 February 2026. It is scheduled to be released theatrically in Spain by BTeam Pictures on 2 October 2026.

== Accolades ==
Award	Date of ceremony	Category	Recipient(s)	Result	Ref.
Berlin International Film Festival	February 20, 2026	Teddy Award	Marcelo Martinessi	Won	
Berlin International Film Festival	February 20, 2026	Panorama Audience Award for Best Feature Film	Marcelo Martinessi	Nominated	
Santiago International Film Festival	November 8, 2026	Best Film – International Competition	Marcelo Martinessi	Won	

== See also ==
- List of submissions to the 99th Academy Awards for Best International Feature Film
- List of Paraguayan submissions for the Academy Award for Best International Feature Film
