= Cannes Film Festival Award for Best Actor =

Film award category

Best Actor Award
- Prix d'interprétation masculine (French)
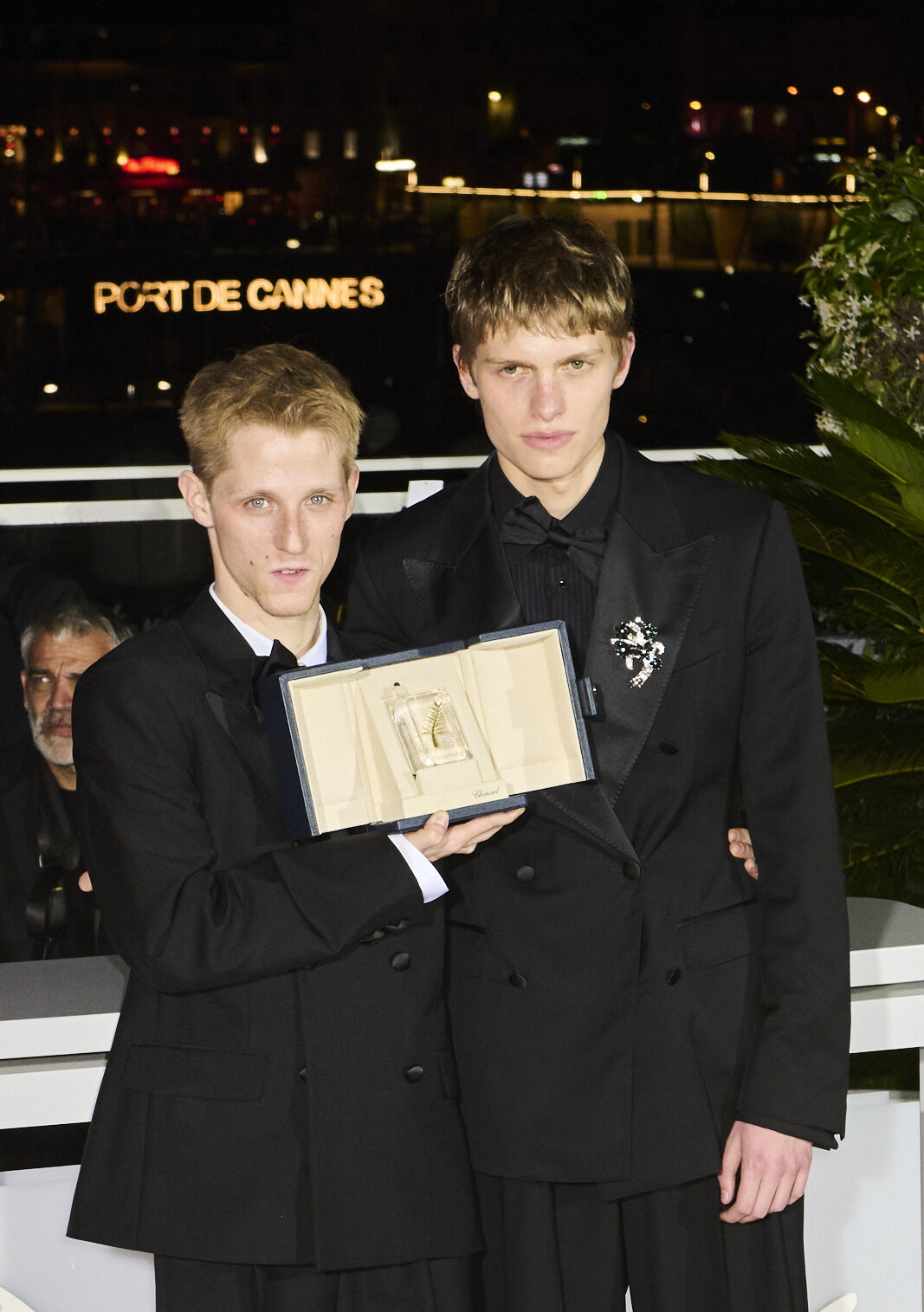
- 2026 recipients: Valentin Campagne and Emmanuel Macchia
- Awarded for: Best Performance by an Actor
- Presented by: Cannes Film Festival
- First award: 1946
- Currently held by: Emmanuel Macchia and Valentin Campagne for Coward (2026)
- Website: www.festival-cannes.com/en/

The Best Actor Award (French: Prix d'interprétation masculine) is an award presented at the Cannes Film Festival since 1946. It is given to an actor who has delivered an outstanding performance and chosen by the jury from the films in official competition slate at the festival.

Its most recent winners were Emmanuel Macchia and Valentin Campagne for Coward at the 79th Cannes Film Festival in 2026.

== History ==
The award was first presented in 1946, at the 1st Cannes Film Festival, where Ray Milland was the first winner for his performance in The Lost Weekend.

The prize was not awarded on five occasions (1947, 1953–54, 1956, and 1960). The festival was not held at all in 1948, 1950, and 2020. In 1968, no awards were given as the festival was called off mid-way due to the May 1968 events in France. The award can be for lead or supporting roles, with the exception of the period from 1979 to 1981, and in 1991, when the festival used to award a separate "Best Supporting Actor" prize. The jury also, on occasion, cites actors with a special citation that is separate from the main award.

On four occasions, the jury has awarded multiple men (more than 2) the prize for one film. The four films were: A Big Family (1955), Compulsion (1959), Long Day's Journey into Night (1962), Days of Glory (2006) and Coward (2026).

Belgian actor Emmanuel Macchia won in his acting debut for Coward (2026), being the first actor to do so.

Dean Stockwell, Jack Lemmon, and Marcello Mastroianni have won the most awards in this category, each winning twice.

== Winners ==
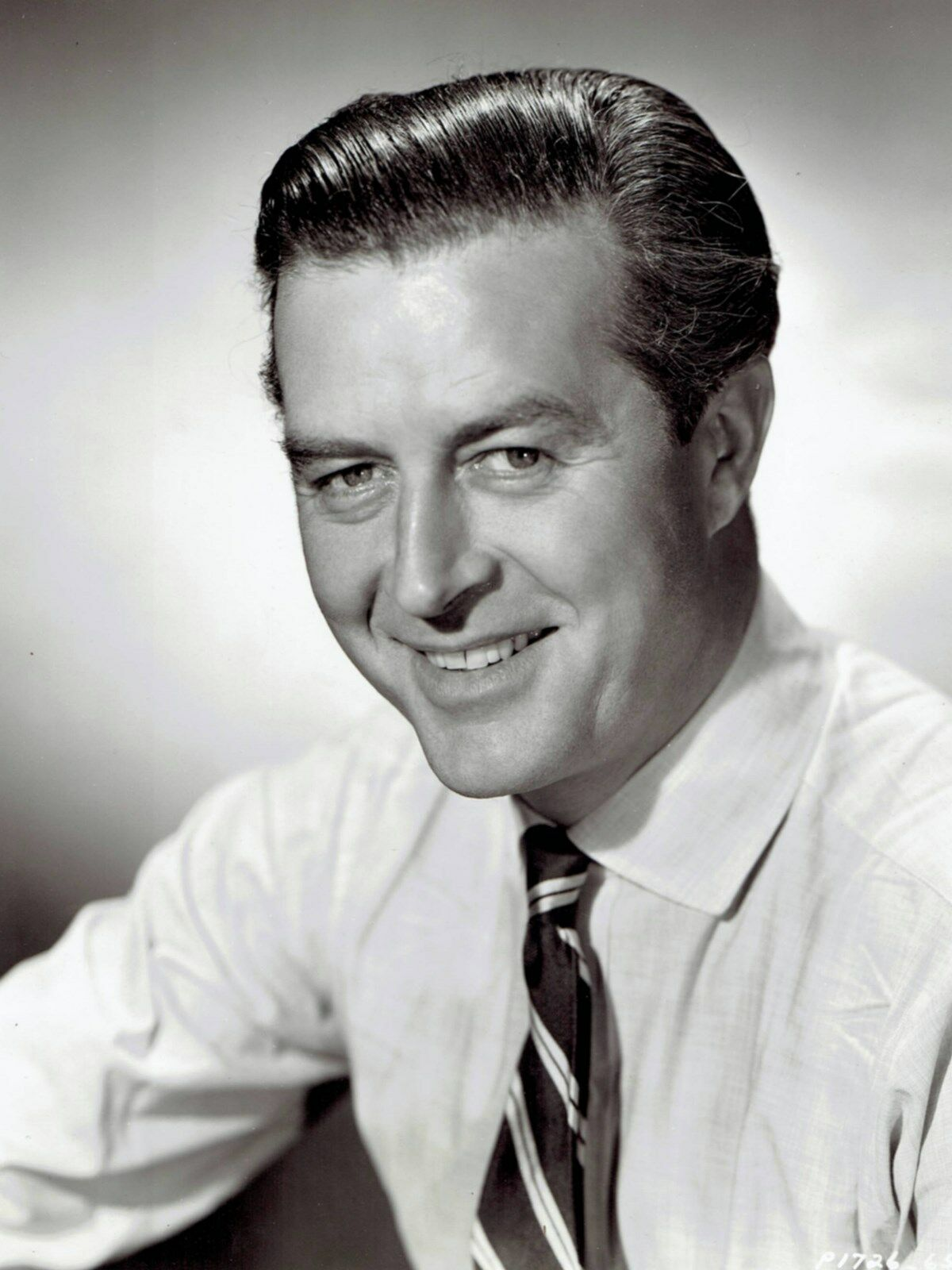
Ray Milland won for The Lost Weekend (1946)

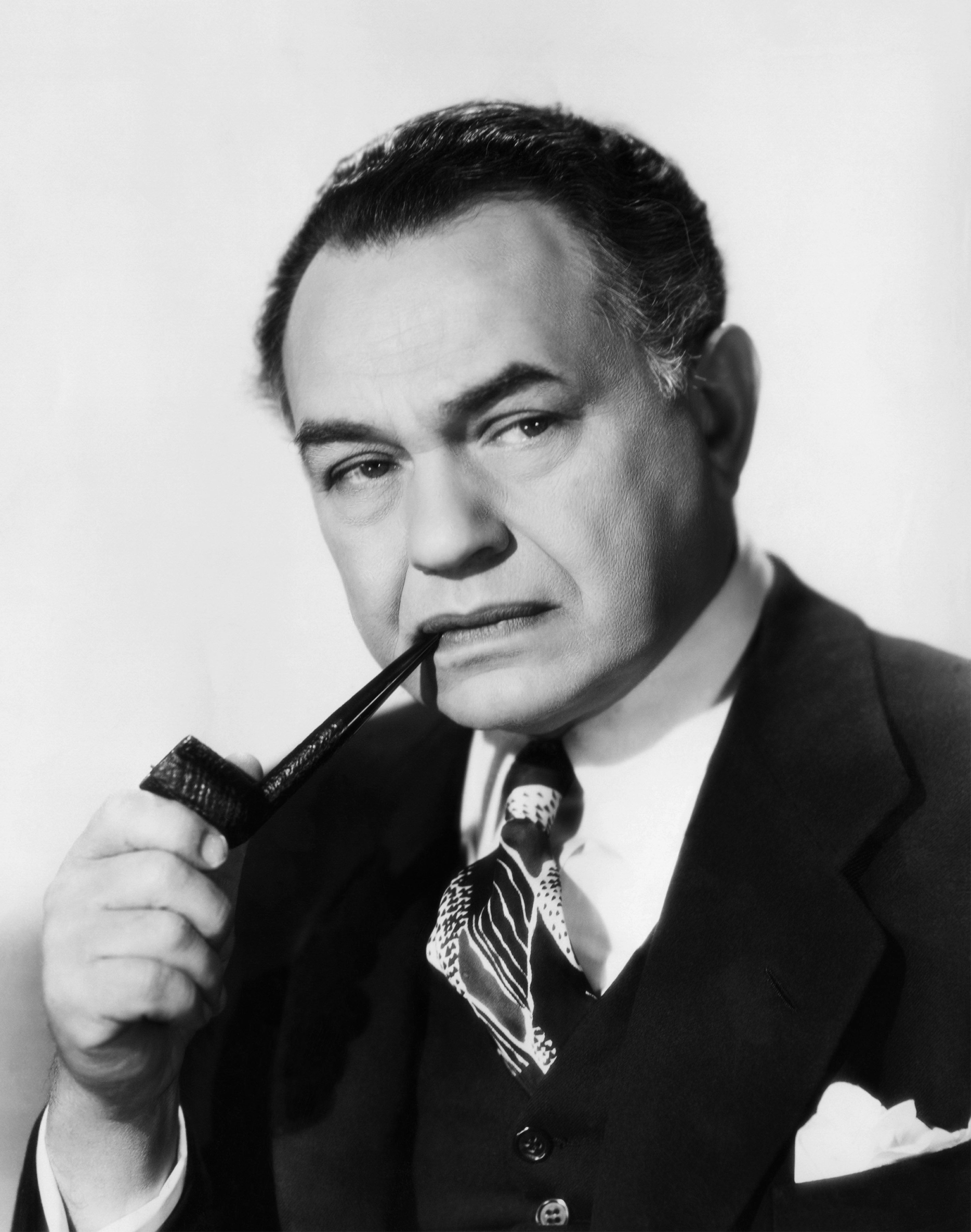
Edward G. Robinson won for House of Strangers (1947)

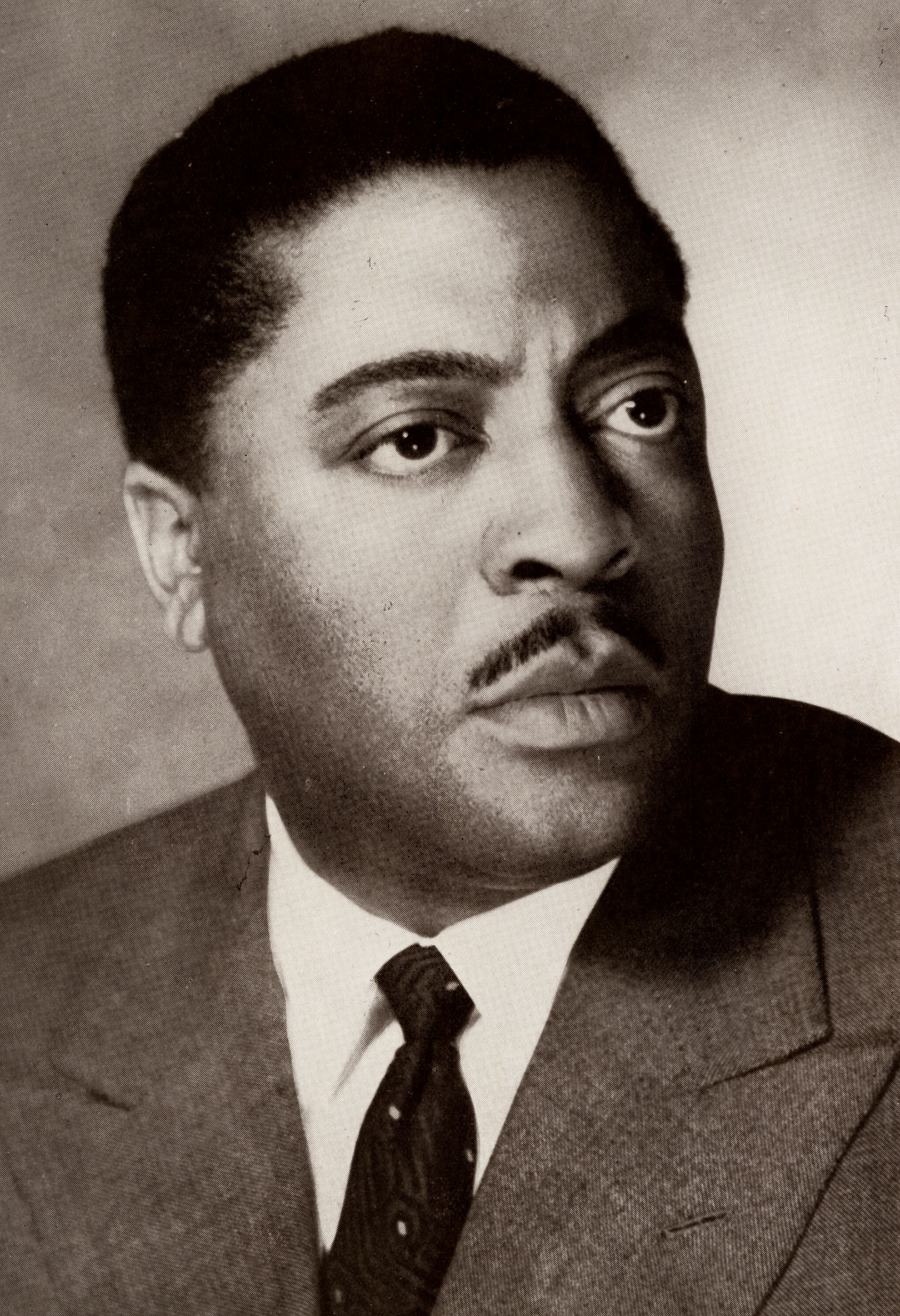
John Kitzmiller was the first Black winner, for Valley of Peace (1957)

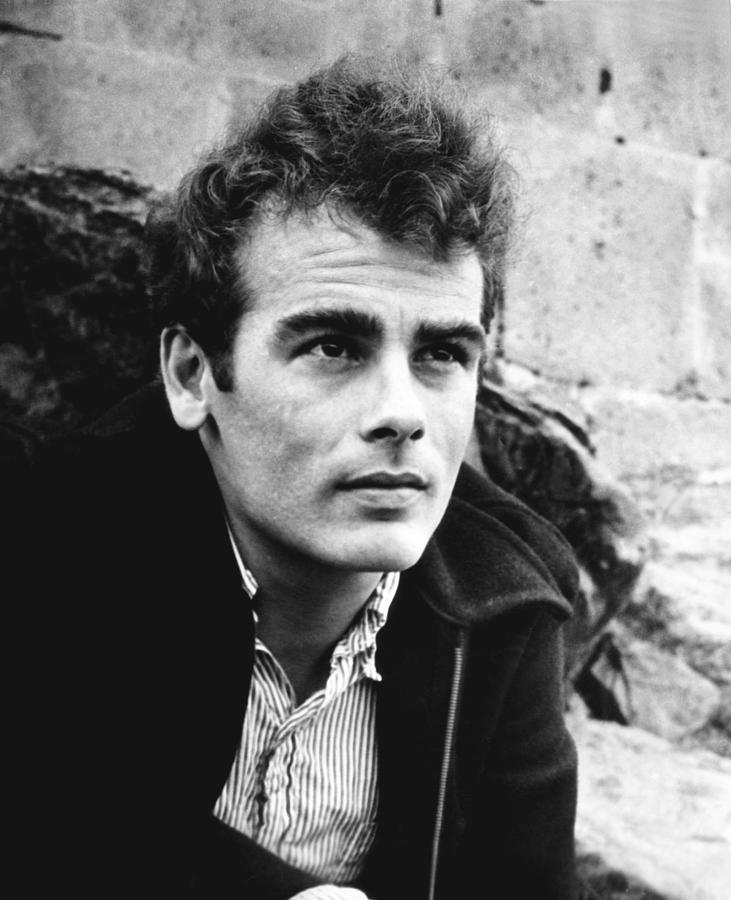
Dean Stockwell won twice for Compulsion (1959), and Long Day's Journey into Night (1962)

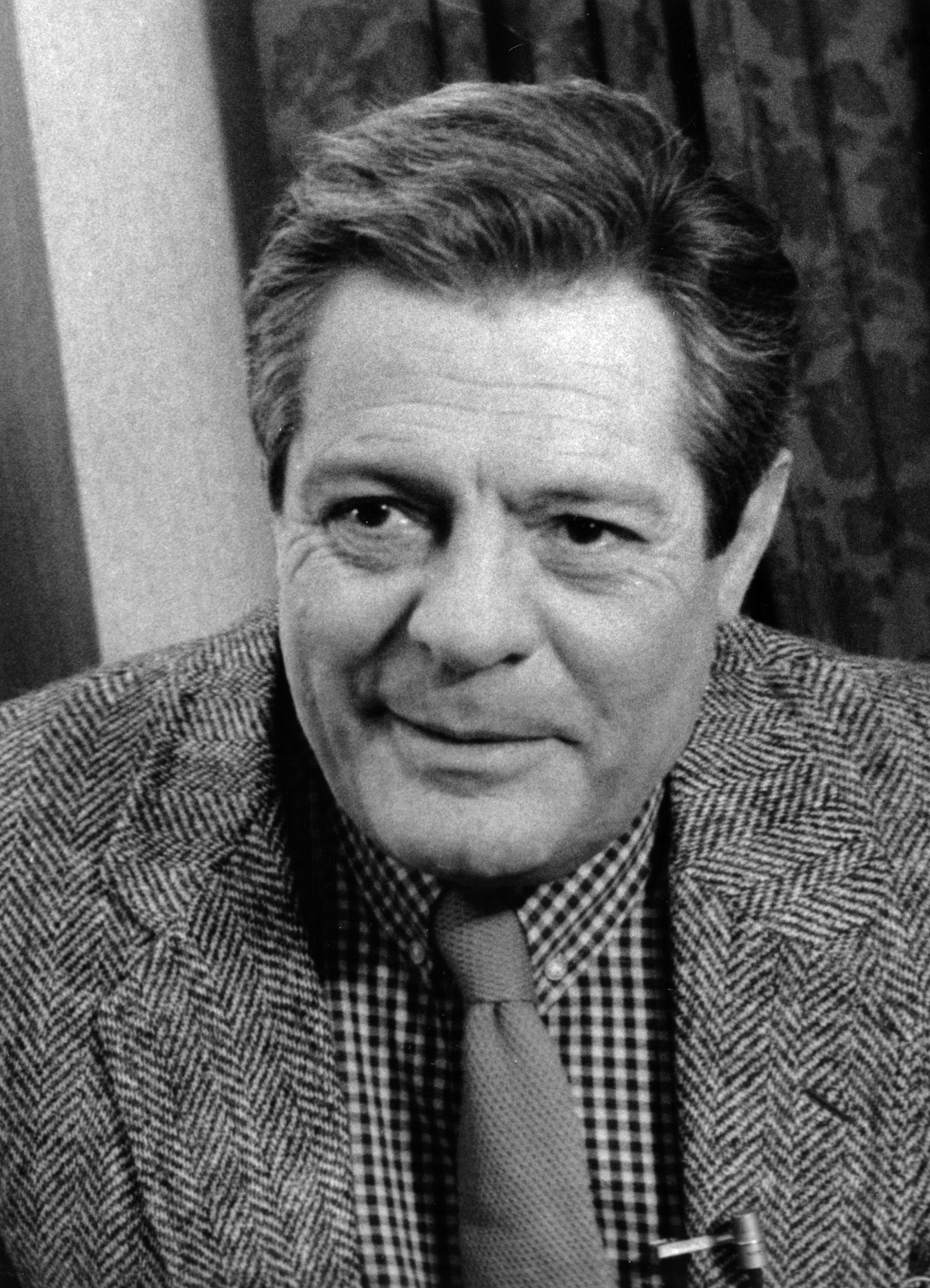
Marcello Mastroianni won twice for The Pizza Triangle (1970) and Dark Eyes (1987)

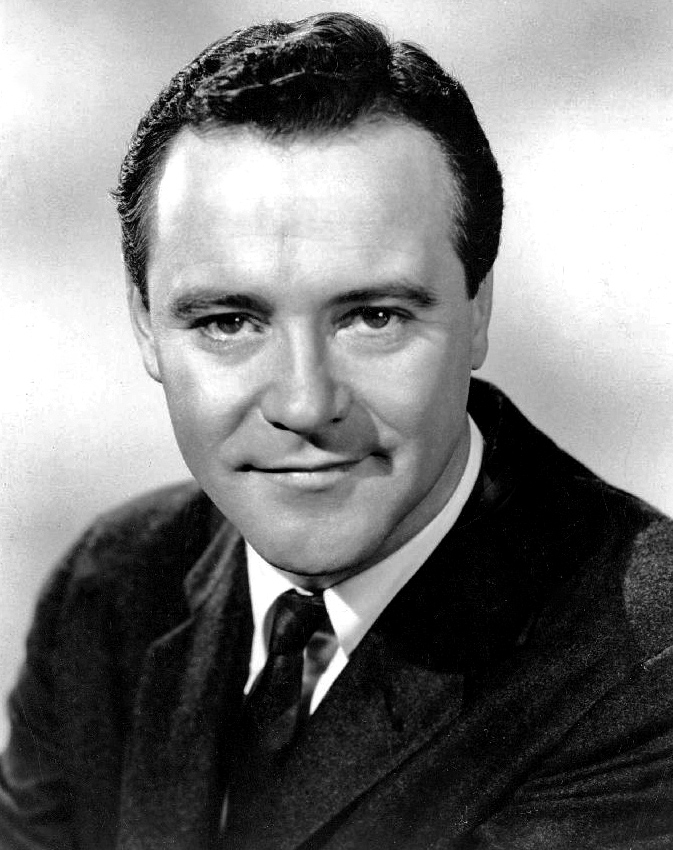
Jack Lemmon won for The China Syndrome (1979) and Missing (1982)

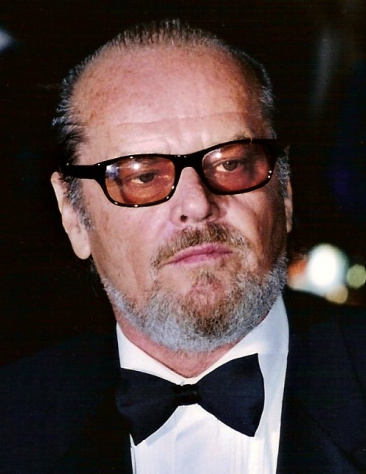
Jack Nicholson won for The Last Detail (1974)

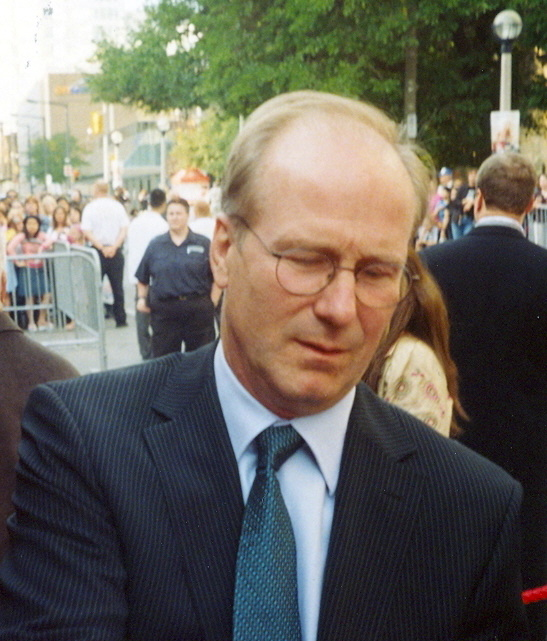
William Hurt won for Kiss of the Spider Woman (1985)

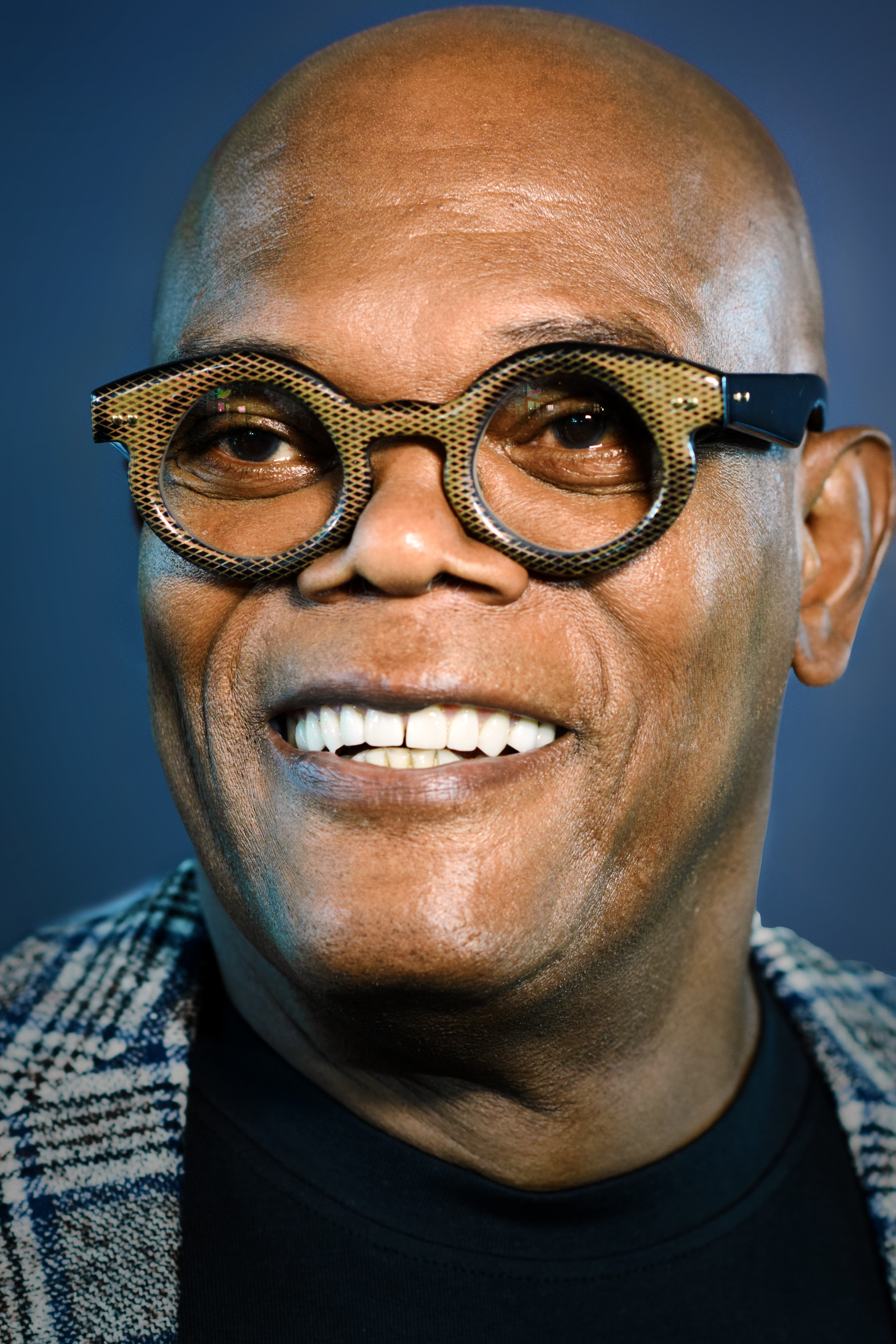
Samuel L. Jackson won for Jungle Fever (1991)

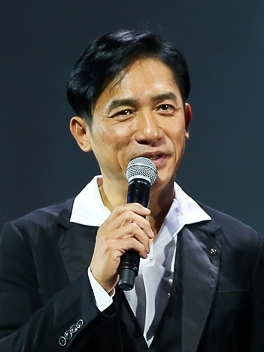
Tony Leung won for In the Mood for Love (2000)

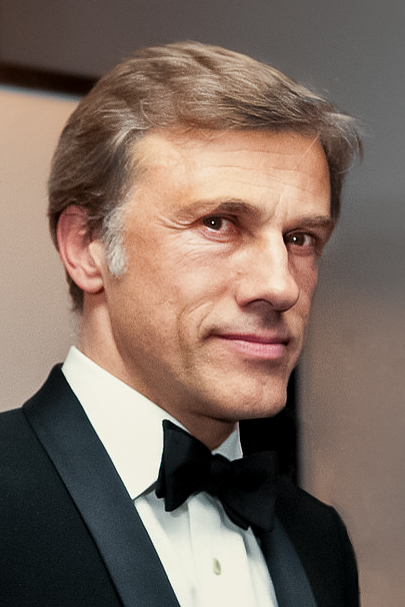
Christoph Waltz won for Inglorious Basterds (2009)

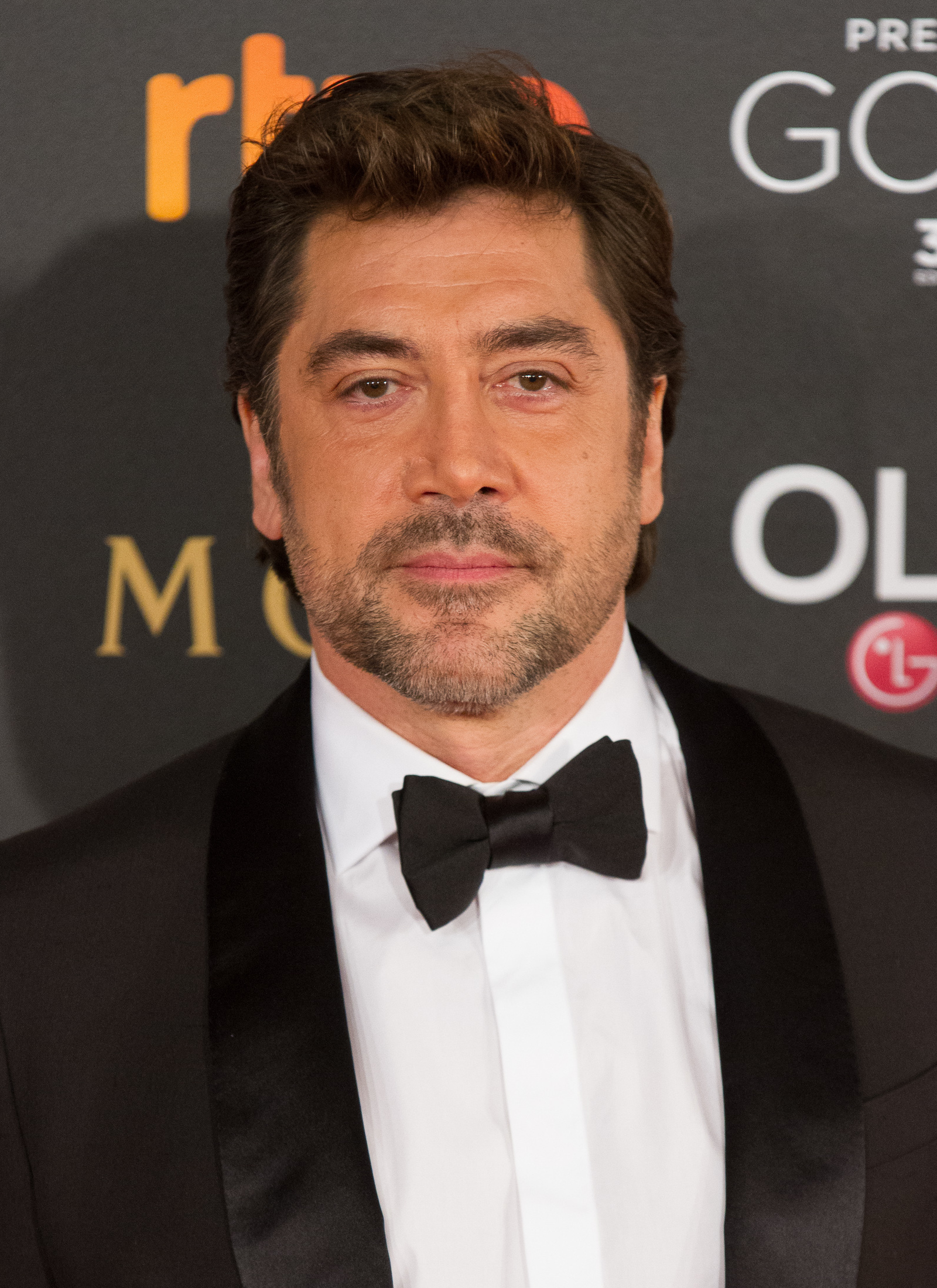
Javier Bardem won for Biutiful (2010)

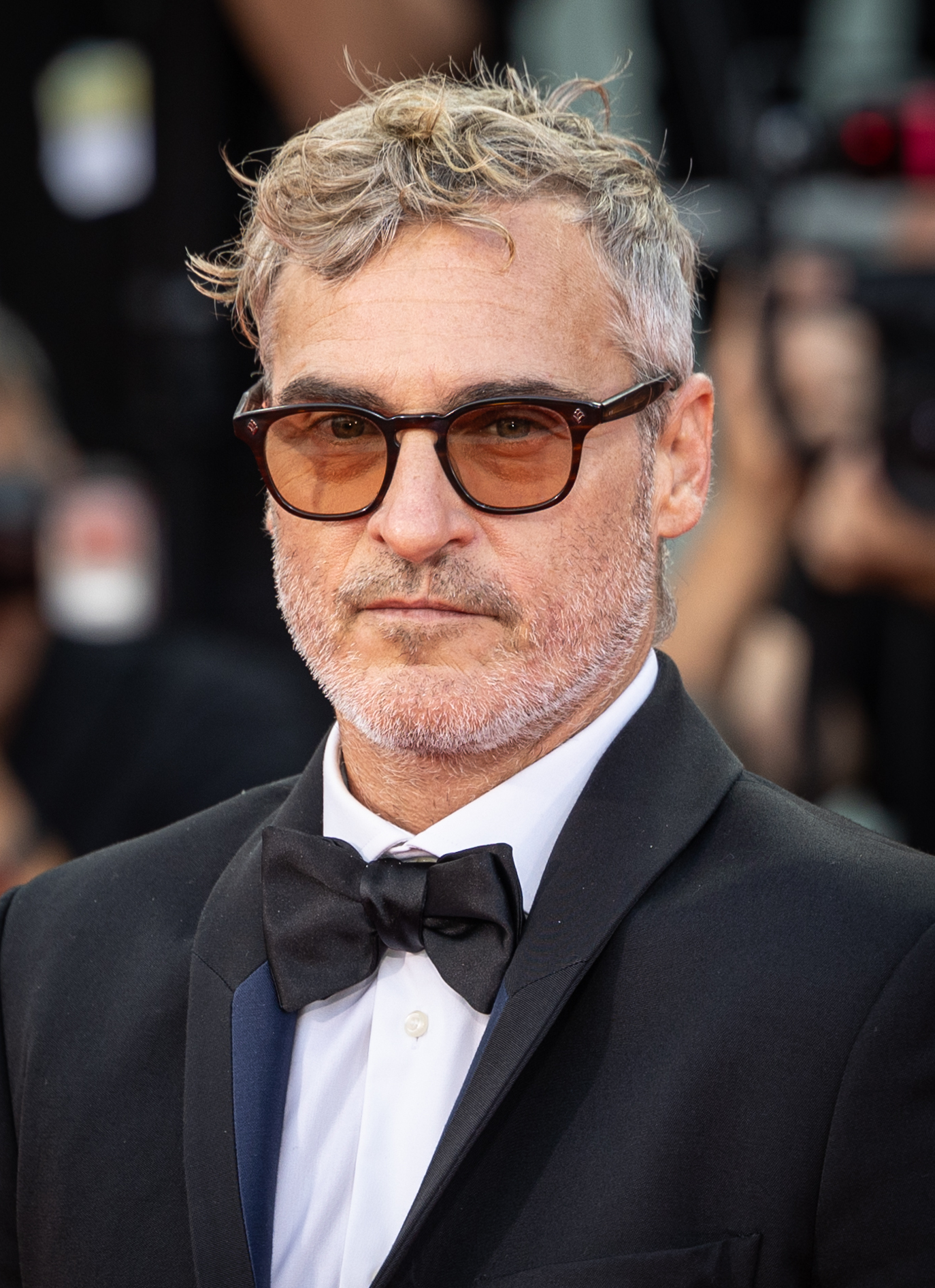
Joaquin Phoenix won for You Were Never Really Here (2017)

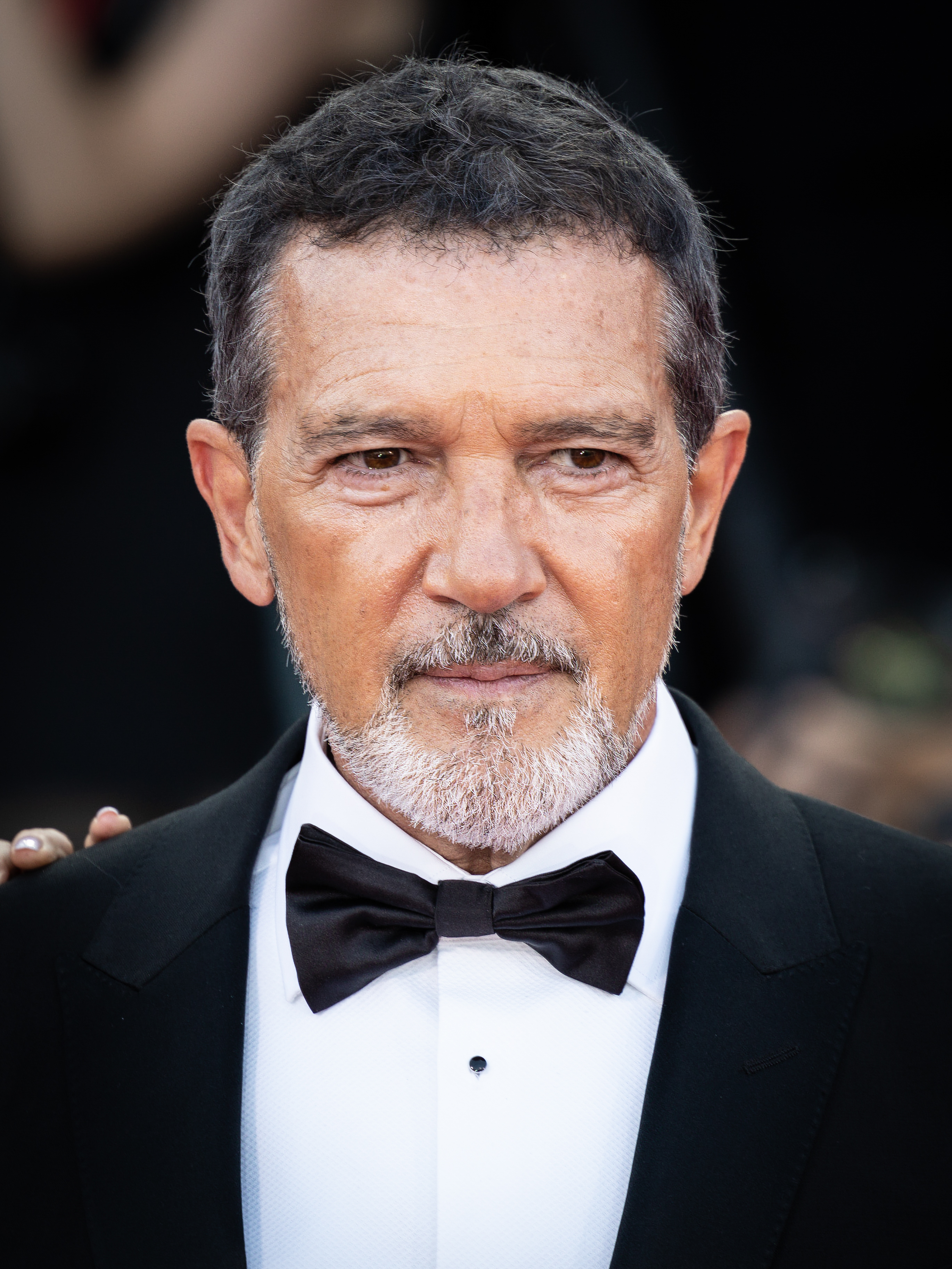
Antonio Banderas won for Pain and Glory (2019)

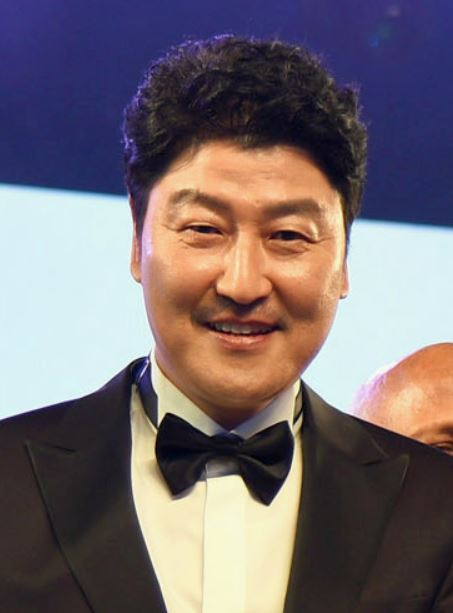
Song Kang-ho won for Broker (2022)

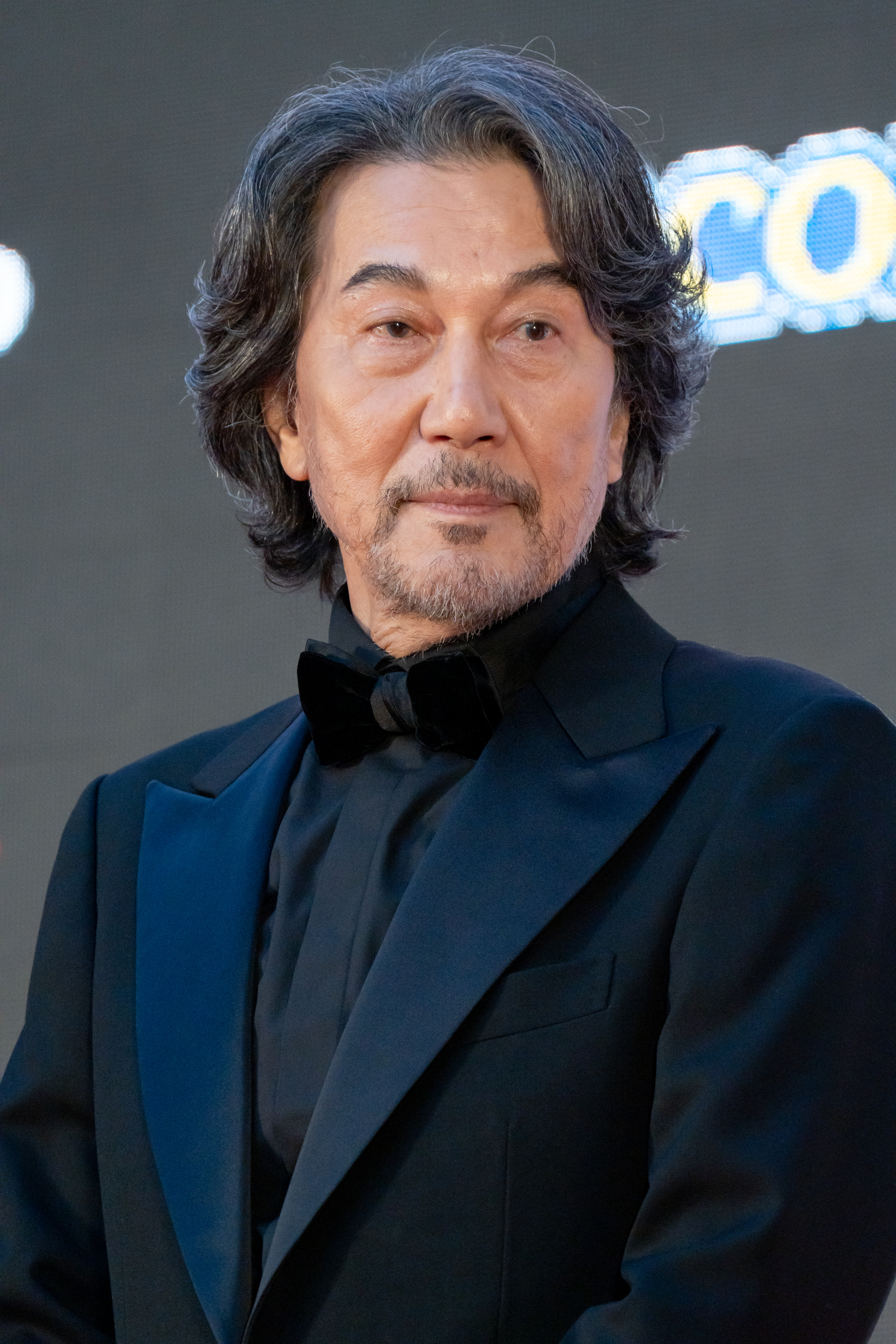
Yakusho Koji won for Perfect Days (2023)

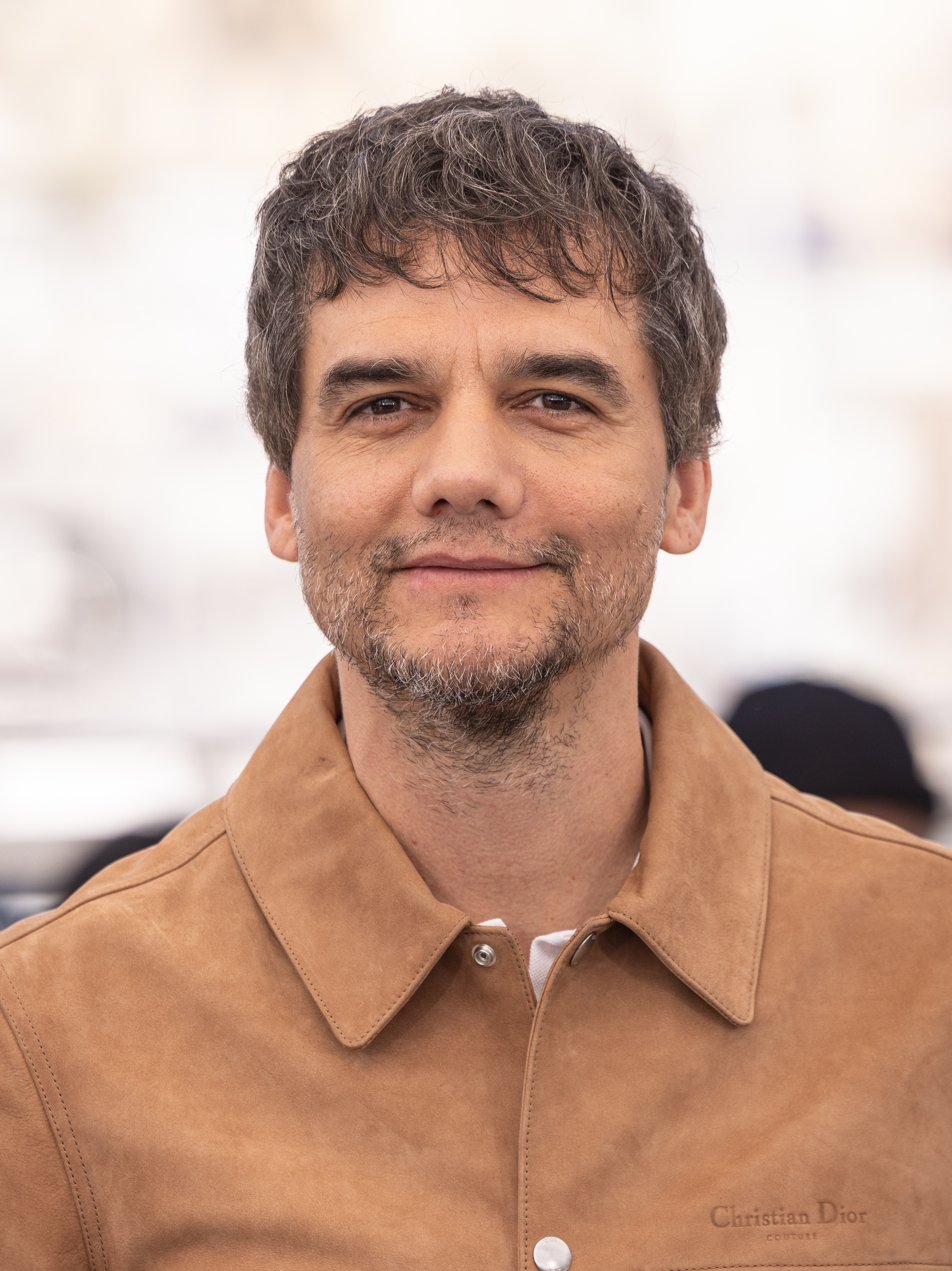
Wagner Moura won for The Secret Agent (2025)

Table key
‡	Indicates the Best Supporting Actor winner

=== 1940s ===
Year	Actor	Role(s)	Title	Ref.
1946	Ray Milland	Don Birnam	The Lost Weekend	
1949	Edward G. Robinson	Gino Monetti	House of Strangers	

=== 1950s ===
Year	Actor	Role(s)	English Title	Original Title	Ref.
1951	Michael Redgrave	Andrew Crocker-Harris	The Browning Version		
1952	Marlon Brando	Emiliano Zapata	Viva Zapata!		
1955^{[A]}^{[B]}	Spencer Tracy	John J. Macreedy	Bad Day at Black Rock		
1955^{[A]}^{[B]}	Sergei Lukyanov	Matvei Zhurbin	A Big Family	Больша́я семья́	
1955^{[A]}^{[B]}	Boris Andreyev	Ilya Matveyevich Zhurbin	A Big Family	Больша́я семья́	
1955^{[A]}^{[B]}	Aleksey Batalov	Aleksei Zhurbin	A Big Family	Больша́я семья́	
1955^{[A]}^{[B]}	Sergei Kurilov	Viktor Zhurbin	A Big Family	Больша́я семья́	
1955^{[A]}^{[B]}	Vadim Medvedev	Anton Zhurbin	A Big Family	Больша́я семья́	
1955^{[A]}^{[B]}	Boris Bityukov	Kostya Zhurbin	A Big Family	Больша́я семья́	
1955^{[A]}^{[B]}	Nikolai Gritsenko	Club Manager	A Big Family	Больша́я семья́	
1955^{[A]}^{[B]}	Pavel Kadochnikov	Skobolev	A Big Family	Больша́я семья́	
1955^{[A]}^{[B]}	Boris Kokovkin	Shipyard Director	A Big Family	Больша́я семья́	
1955^{[A]}^{[B]}	Nikolay Sergeev	Basmanov	A Big Family	Больша́я семья́	
1957	John Kitzmiller	Sgt. Jim	Valley of Peace		
1958	Paul Newman	Ben Quick	The Long, Hot Summer		
1959	Bradford Dillman	Artie Strauss	Compulsion		
1959	Dean Stockwell	Judd Steiner	Compulsion		
1959	Orson Welles	Jonathan Wilk	Compulsion		

=== 1960s ===
Year	Actor	Role(s)	English Title	Original Title	Ref.
1961	Anthony Perkins	Philip Van Der Besh	Goodbye Again		
1962 ^{[C]}	Murray Melvin	Geoffrey Inghman	A Taste of Honey		
1962 ^{[C]}	Ralph Richardson	James Tyrone Sr.	Long Day's Journey into Night		
1962 ^{[C]}	Jason Robards	James Tyrone Jr.	Long Day's Journey into Night		
1962 ^{[C]}	Dean Stockwell	Edmund Tyrone	Long Day's Journey into Night		
1963	Richard Harris	Frank Machin	This Sporting Life		
1964	Antal Páger	Vajkay Ákos	Drama of the Lark	Pacsirta	
1964	Saro Urzì	Don Vincenzo Ascalone	Seduced and Abandoned	Sedotta e abbandonata	
1965	Terence Stamp	Freddie Clegg	The Collector		
1966	Per Oscarsson	Pontus	Hunger	Svält	
1967	Oded Kotler	Eli	Three Days and a Child	שלושה ימים וילד	
1969	Jean-Louis Trintignant	The Examining Magistrate	Z		

=== 1970s ===
Year	Actor	Role(s)	English Title	Original Title	Ref.
1970	Marcello Mastroianni	Oreste Nardi	The Pizza Triangle	Dramma della gelosia (tutti i particolari in cronaca)	
1971	Riccardo Cucciolla	Nicola Sacco	Sacco & Vanzetti	Sacco e Vanzetti	
1972	Jean Yanne	Jean	We Won't Grow Old Together	Nous ne vieillirons pas ensemble	
1973	Giancarlo Giannini	Antonio Soffiantini	Love and Anarchy	Film d'amore e d'anarchia, ovvero: stamattina alle 10, in via dei Fiori, nella nota casa di tolleranza...	
1974	Jack Nicholson	Billy L. Buddusky	The Last Detail		
1975	Vittorio Gassman	Fausto Consolo	Scent of a Woman	Profumo di donna	
1976	José Luis Gómez	Pascual Duarte	Pascual Duarte		
1977	Fernando Rey	Luis	Elisa, My Life	Elisa, vida mía	
1978	Jon Voight	Luke Martin	Coming Home		
1979	Jack Lemmon	Jack Godell	The China Syndrome		
1979	Stefano Madia ‡	Marco Millozza	Dear Father	Caro papà	

=== 1980s ===
Year	Actor	Role(s)	English Title	Original Title	Ref.
1980	Michel Piccoli	Mauro Ponticelli	A Leap in the Dark	Salto nel vuoto	
1980	Jack Thompson ‡	Major J.F. Thomas	Breaker Morant		
1981	Ugo Tognazzi	Primo Spaggiari	Tragedy of a Ridiculous Man	La tragedia di un uomo ridicolo	
1981	Ian Holm ‡	Sam Mussabini	Chariots of Fire		
1982	Jack Lemmon	Edmund Horman	Missing		
1983	Gian Maria Volonté	Bernard Fontana	The Death of Mario Ricci	La mort de Mario Ricci	
1984	Alfredo Landa	Paco el Bajo	The Holy Innocents	Los santos inocentes	
1984	Francisco Rabal	Azarías	The Holy Innocents	Los santos inocentes	
1985	William Hurt	Luis Molina	Kiss of the Spider Woman	O Beijo da Mulher Aranha	
1986	Michel Blanc	Antoine	Evening Dress	Tenue de soirée	
1986	Bob Hoskins	George	Mona Lisa		
1987	Marcello Mastroianni	Romano	Dark Eyes	Oci ciornie	
1988	Forest Whitaker	Charlie "Bird" Parker	Bird		
1989	James Spader	Graham Dalton	Sex, Lies, and Videotape		

=== 1990s ===
Year	Actor	Role(s)	English Title	Original Title	Ref.
1990	Gérard Depardieu	Cyrano de Bergerac	Cyrano de Bergerac		
1991	John Turturro	Barton Fink	Barton Fink		
1991	Samuel L. Jackson ‡	Gator Purify	Jungle Fever		
1992	Tim Robbins	Griffin Mill	The Player		
1993	David Thewlis	Johnny	Naked		
1994	Ge You	Xu Fugui	To Live	活著	
1995	Jonathan Pryce	Lytton Strachey	Carrington		
1996	Daniel Auteuil	Harry	The Eighth Day	Le huitième jour	
1996	Pascal Duquenne	Georges	The Eighth Day	Le huitième jour	
1997	Sean Penn	Eddie Quinn	She's So Lovely		
1998	Peter Mullan	Joe Kavanagh	My Name Is Joe		
1999	Emmanuel Schotté	Pharaon de Winter	Humanité	L'humanité	

=== 2000s ===
Year	Actor	Role(s)	English Title	Original Title	Ref.
2000	Tony Leung Chiu-wai	Chow Mo-wan	In the Mood for Love	花樣年華	
2001	Benoît Magimel	Walter Klemmer	The Piano Teacher	La Pianiste	
2002	Olivier Gourmet	Olivier	The Son	Le Fils	
2003	Muzaffer Özdemir	Mahmut	Uzak		
2003	Mehmet Emin Toprak	Yusuf	Uzak		
2004	Yūya Yagira	Akira Fukushima	Nobody Knows	誰も知らない	
2005	Tommy Lee Jones	Pete Perkins	The Three Burials of Melquiades Estrada		
2006	Roschdy Zem	Messaoud Souni	Days of Glory	Indigènes	
2006	Bernard Blancan	Sergent Roger Martinez	Days of Glory	Indigènes	
2006	Jamel Debbouze	Saïd Otmari	Days of Glory	Indigènes	
2006	Samy Naceri	Yassir	Days of Glory	Indigènes	
2006	Sami Bouajila	Abdelkader	Days of Glory	Indigènes	
2007	Konstantin Lavronenko	Alex	The Banishment	Изгнание	
2008	Benicio del Toro	Ernesto "Che" Guevara	Che		
2009	Christoph Waltz	Col. Hans Landa	Inglourious Basterds		

=== 2010s ===
Year	Actor	Role(s)	English Title	Original Title	Ref.
2010	Javier Bardem	Uxbal	Biutiful		
2010	Elio Germano	Claudio	La nostra vita		
2011	Jean Dujardin	George Valentin	The Artist		
2012	Mads Mikkelsen	Lucas	The Hunt	Jagten	
2013	Bruce Dern	Woody Grant	Nebraska		
2014	Timothy Spall	J. M. W. Turner	Mr. Turner		
2015	Vincent Lindon	Thierry Taugourdeau	The Measure of a Man	La Loi du marché	
2016	Shahab Hosseini	Emad	The Salesman	فروشنده	
2017	Joaquin Phoenix	Joe	You Were Never Really Here		
2018	Marcello Fonte	Marcello	Dogman		
2019	Antonio Banderas	Salvador Mallo	Pain and Glory	Dolor y gloria	

=== 2020s ===
Year	Actor	Role(s)	English Title	Original Title	Ref.
2021	Caleb Landry Jones	Martin Bryant	Nitram		
2022	Song Kang-ho	Sang-hyeon	Broker	브로커	
2023	Koji Yakusho	Hirayama	Perfect Days		
2024	Jesse Plemons	Robert / Daniel / Andrew	Kinds of Kindness		
2025	Wagner Moura	Marcelo	The Secret Agent	O Agente Secreto	
2026	Emmanuel Macchia	Pierre	Coward		
2026	Valentin Campagne	Francis	Coward		

== Multiple winners ==
The following individuals have received multiple Best Actor awards:

Number of wins	Actors	Nationality	Films
2	Dean Stockwell	United States	Compulsion (1959), Long Day's Journey into Night (1962)
2	Jack Lemmon	United States	The China Syndrome (1979), Missing (1982)
2	Marcello Mastroianni	Italy	The Pizza Triangle (1970), Dark Eyes (1987)

== See also ==
The following individuals have also received Best Actor award(s) at Venice or Berlin Film Festival.

Winning year	Actors	Festival	Year	English title	Nationality
1958	Paul Newman	Berlin	1995	Nobody's Fool	United States
1969	Jean-Louis Trintignant	Berlin	1968	The Man Who Lies	France
1970 1987	Marcello Mastroianni	Venice	1989	What Time Is It?	Italy
1970 1987	Marcello Mastroianni	Venice	1993	1, 2, 3, Sun	Italy
1979 1982	Jack Lemmon	Berlin	1981	Tribute	United States
1979 1982	Jack Lemmon	Venice	1992	Glengarry Glen Ross	United States
1980	Michel Piccoli	Berlin	1982	Strange Affair	France
1983	Gian Maria Volonté	Berlin	1987	The Moro Affair	Italy
1990	Gérard Depardieu	Venice	1985	Police	France
1991	Samuel L. Jackson ‡	Berlin	1998	Jackie Brown	United States
1997	Sean Penn	Berlin	1996	Dead Man Walking	United States
1997	Sean Penn	Venice	1998	Hurlyburly	United States
1997	Sean Penn	Venice	2003	21 Grams	United States
2008	Benicio del Toro	Berlin	2001	Traffic	Puerto Rico
2010	Javier Bardem	Venice	2000	Before Night Falls	Spain
2010	Javier Bardem	Venice	2004	The Sea Inside	Spain
2010	Elio Germano	Berlin	2020	Hidden Away	Italy
2013	Bruce Dern	Berlin	1983	That Championship Season	United States
2015	Vincent Lindon	Venice	2024	The Quiet Son	France
2016	Shahab Hosseini	Berlin	2011	A Separation	Iran
2017	Joaquin Phoenix	Venice	2012	The Master	United States

== Notes ==
A: This year the award was changed to Prix d'Interpretation (Acting Award), without gender differentiation.
B: The entire male and female cast of A Big Family (Больша́я семья́) was recipient of this award in a tie with Spencer Tracy for Bad Day at Black Rock.
C: This year award was given as Prix Le Premier Regard Un Certain Regard (Premiere Award - Un Certain Regard) to the lead male and female cast of Long Day's Journey into Night and A Taste of Honey (ex aequo).
