= Jonge Garde =

2016 Dutch-language television series

- Genre: Scripted reality
- Directed by: Timon Moll; Geert Jan van Morstelt; Roos van Duuren; Nicolien Kool
- Starring: Ridder van Kooten; Manouk Pluis; Roos Exoo; Arjan Smit
- Country of origin: Netherlands
- Original language: Dutch
- No. of seasons: 2
- No. of episodes: 43

Production
- Running time: 12 minutes
- Production company: Tuvalu Media

Original release
- Network: Disney Channel
- Release: October 26, 2015 – December 1, 2016

Jonge Garde is a Disney Channel original television series, originally broadcast in the Netherlands and Belgium. Jonge Garde started on October 26, 2015. The series consists of two seasons for a total of 43 episodes, each of 11 to 12 minutes. The cast consists entirely of Dutch and Flemish actors.

In Wallonia, the voices are dubbed into French. The series was also dubbed and broadcast in France and Italy.

== Cast ==
Actor	Role
Hanneleen Claes	Sophie Deudermonde
Ridder van Kooten	Levi Donselaar
Amélie Scheepers	Caroline de Vries
Dianne van den Eng	Marie-Elise Wolf (season 1)
Manouk Pluis	Noa de Lange (season 2)
Mathias T'syen	Thomas Nimmermeer
Rohan Sukhraj	Aram Dupont
Roos Exoo	Mrs Mastoer
Chiel Christiaans	Rens Mesker
Anne Van Opstal	Veerle de Keulenaer
Arjan Smit	Lucas de Lange (season 2)
Jeroen Bos	Eddy De Koning (season 1)
Kiki Jaski	Sylvia De Koning (season 1)
Koos Landeweerd	Meneer Fons (season 1)

== Release ==
The series first aired on October 26, 2015, with the last episode of the first season airing on December 3, 2015. The second season premiered on November 7, 2016 and ran until December 1, 2016.
