= Valentin Campagne =

French actor

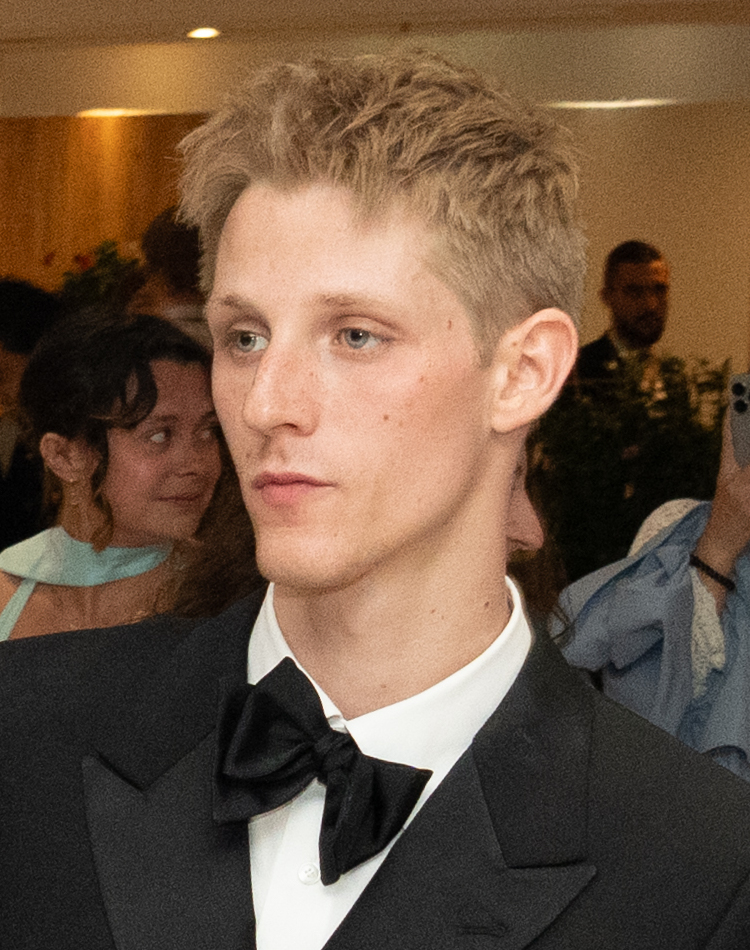
- Campagne at the 2026 Cannes Film Festival
- Born: 2003 or 2004 (age 22–23); Paris, France
- Occupation: Actor
- Years active: 2023–present

Valentin Campagne is a French actor. For his performance in Coward (2026), he won the Cannes Film Festival Award for Best Actor, which he shared with his co-star Emmanuel Macchia.

== Biography ==
Campagne began attended Cours Florent in Paris during 2023. He started his career with roles in theatre and television before transitioning to cinema in 2025. He had small roles in Dominik Moll's Case 137 and Cédric Klapisch's Colours of Time (both 2025).

In 2026, he starred in Lukas Dhont's war drama film Coward (2026), which follows a gay love story in the Belgian front of the World War I in 1916. The film had its world premiere at the main competition of the 2026 Cannes Film Festival, where Campagne performance was met with critical acclaim, he ultimately won the Cannes Film Festival Award for Best Actor, which he shared with his co-star Emmanuel Macchia.

== Filmography ==
=== Feature films ===
Year	Title	Role
2025	Case 137	Rémi Cordier
2025	Colours of Time	Gaspard
2025	Gérald le Conquérant	Camille
2026	Sanguine	
2026	Coward	Francis

=== Short films ===
Year	Title	Role
2025	Aux armes, Christopher	
2026	Seule la tendresse	

=== Television ===
Year	Title	Role
2024	L'Éclipse	Quentin Germain
2026	The Hunt	Kevin

=== Music videos ===
Year	Title	Artist
2023	"Alabama"	Adèle Castillon
2024	"Putain d'Hiver"	Jolagreen

== Theatre ==
- 2023: Trouvons la suite, directed by Fanny Montmarin
- 2025: Lost in Stockholm, directed by Paul Desveaux
