= Marcelo Martinessi =

Paraguayan filmmaker (born 1973)

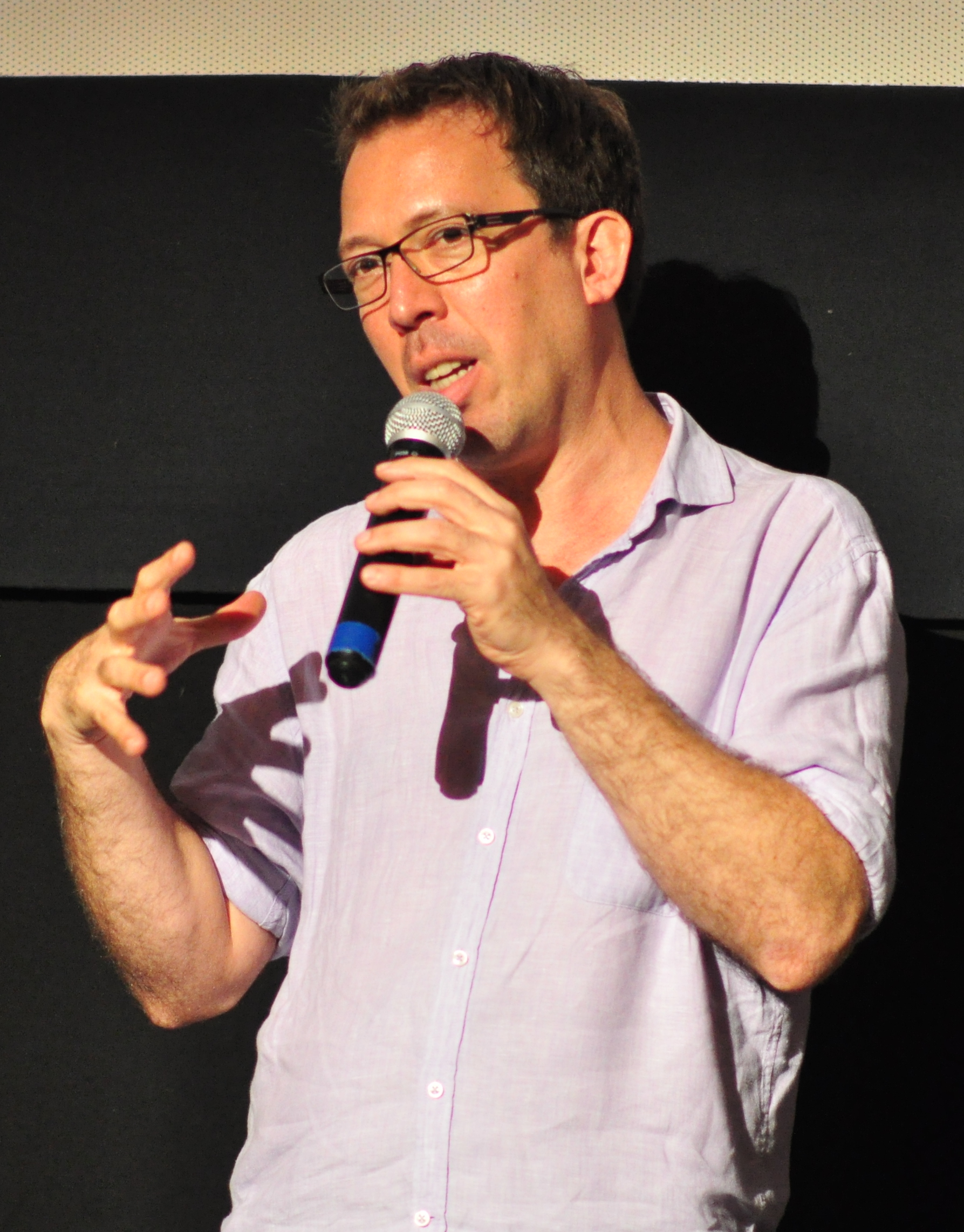
- Marcelo Martinessi, 2018
- Born: 1 January 1973 (age 53); Asuncion, Paraguay
- Occupations: Film director, screenwriter
- Website: La Babosa Cine

Marcelo Martinessi (born 1 January 1973) is a Paraguayan filmmaker. His films include "Karai norte" (2009), "The Lost Voice" (2016), The Heiresses (Spanish: Las herederas) and Narciso (2026) both latted was selected to compete for the Golden Bear at the 68th Berlin International Film Festival.

== Filmography ==
Documentary film

- Los paraguayos (2007)
- Paraguay según Agustín Barrios (2007)
- Diario Guaraní (2016)

Short film

- Partida (2008)
- Karai Norte (2009)
- Calle Última (2011)
- El baldío (2012)
- La voz perdida (2017)

Feature film

- Las herederas (2018)
- Narciso (2026)

== Awards ==
Year	Award	Category	Film	Result
2016	Venice Film Festival	Best Short Film	La Voz Pedida	Won
2018	Berlin International Film Festival	Alfred Bauer Award	Las Herederas	Won
2018	Athens International Film Festival	Best Picture	Las Herederas	Won
2018	Cartagena Film Festival	Best Film	Las Herederas	Nominated
2018	Cartagena Film Festival	Best Director	Las Herederas	Won
2018	San Sebastián International Film Festival	Best Film	Las Herederas	Nominated
2018	San Sebastián International Film Festival	Best Latin American Film	Las Herederas	Won
2018	Fénix Awards	Best Director	Las Herederas	Won
2018	Fénix Awards	Best Screenplay	Las Herederas	Nominated
2018	Seattle International Film Festival	Best Feature Film	Las Herederas	Nominated
2018	Sydney Film Festival	Best Film	Las Herederas	Won
2019	Platino Awards	Best Screenplay	Las Herederas	Nominated
2019	Platino Awards	Best Debut Film	Las Herederas	Won
2019	Platino Awards	Film and Education Values	Las Herederas	Nominated
