= Emmanuel Macchia =

Belgian actor

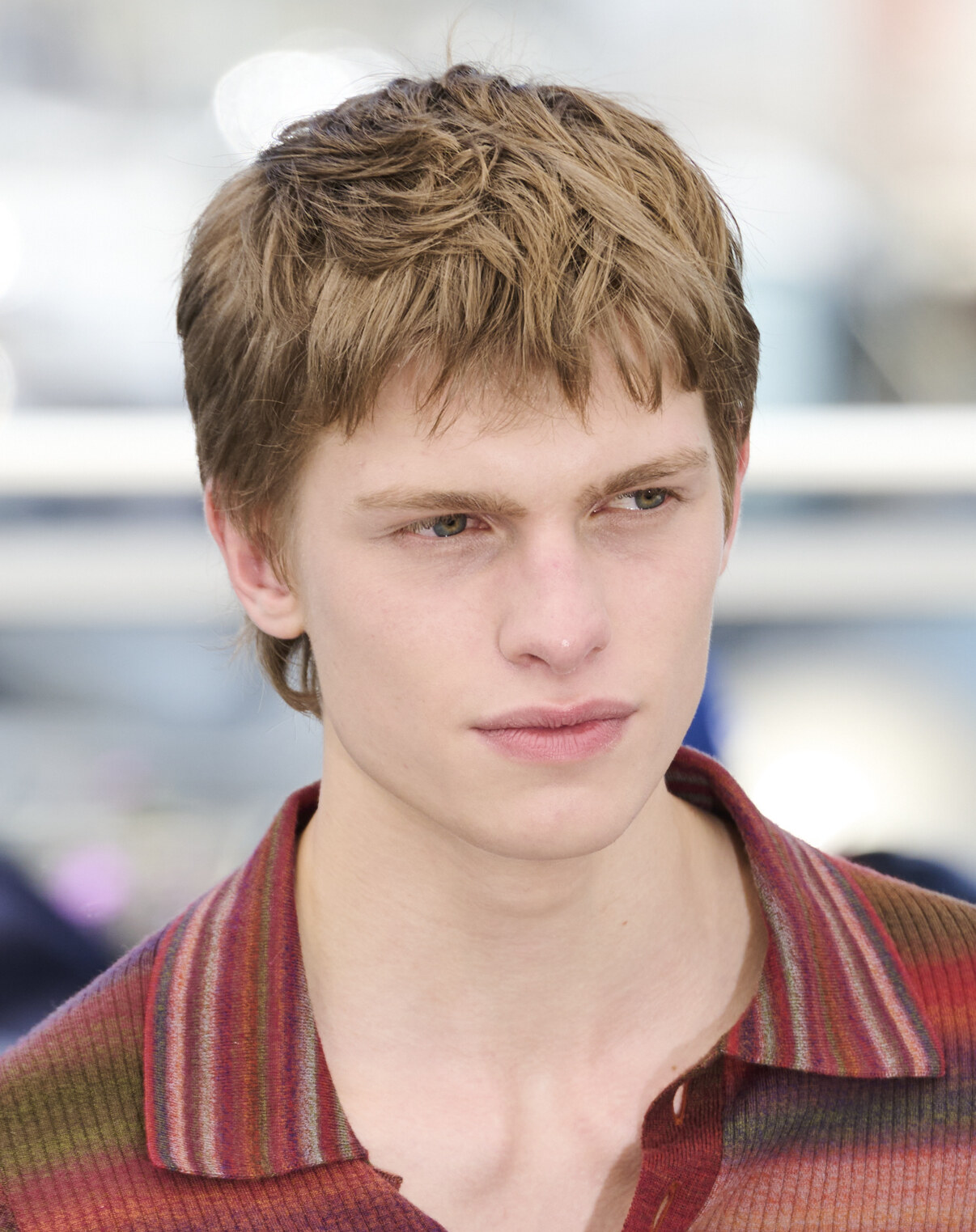
- Macchia at the 2026 Cannes Film Festival
- Born: 2005 or 2006 (age 20–21); Charleroi, Belgium
- Occupation: Actor
- Years active: 2026–present

Emmanuel Macchia is a Belgian actor. For his acting debut in Coward (2026), he won the Cannes Film Festival Award for Best Actor, which he shared with his co-star Valentin Campagne.

== Biography ==
Macchia was born in Charleroi and raised in Ham-sur-Eure. His mother is a schoolteacher and father is an accountant. He has an older brother. Macchia studies landscape architecture at a school in Gembloux, where Belgian filmmaker Lukas Dhont discovered him in a casting call for Coward (2026). He was selected despite having no training in acting or film experience.

Coward follows a gay love story in the Belgian front of the World War I in 1916. The film had its world premiere at the main competition of the 2026 Cannes Film Festival, where Macchia's performance was met with critical acclaim, he ultimately won the Cannes Film Festival Award for Best Actor, which he shared with his co-star Valentin Campagne.
