= Shadows (2024 film) =

2024 French Jordan animated short film

- Directed by: Rand Beiruty
- Produced by: Idris Lettifi; Moussa Lettifi; Jude Kawwa
- Production companies: Piano Sano Films; Shaghab Films
- Release date: 2024
- Running time: 12 minutes
- Countries: Jordan; France
- Languages: German; Arabic

Shadows is a 2024 French and Jordan animated short film written and directed by Rand Beiruty. The 12-minute animated film is about the testimony of a 15-year old teen mother fleeing Baghdad. Shadows received award nominations from nternational film festivals, including Leeds International Film Festival and Annecy International Film Festival.

== Plot ==
15-year old teenage mother Ahlam has fled her homeland of Iraq. She tells her story, through a figurative journey in an airport, and faces the shadows standing in her way to freedom.

== Accolades ==
Year	Festivals	Award/Category	Status
2024	Leeds International Film Festival	World Animation Competition	Won
2024	Venice Biennale	Orizzonti Short Films International Competition	Nominated
2025	Short Shorts Film Festival	Best Animated Short	Nominated
2025	Annecy International Film Festival	Official Competition	Nominated
2025	Regard International Short Film Festival	Official Competition	Won
