= Manana Anasashvili =

Georgian film director

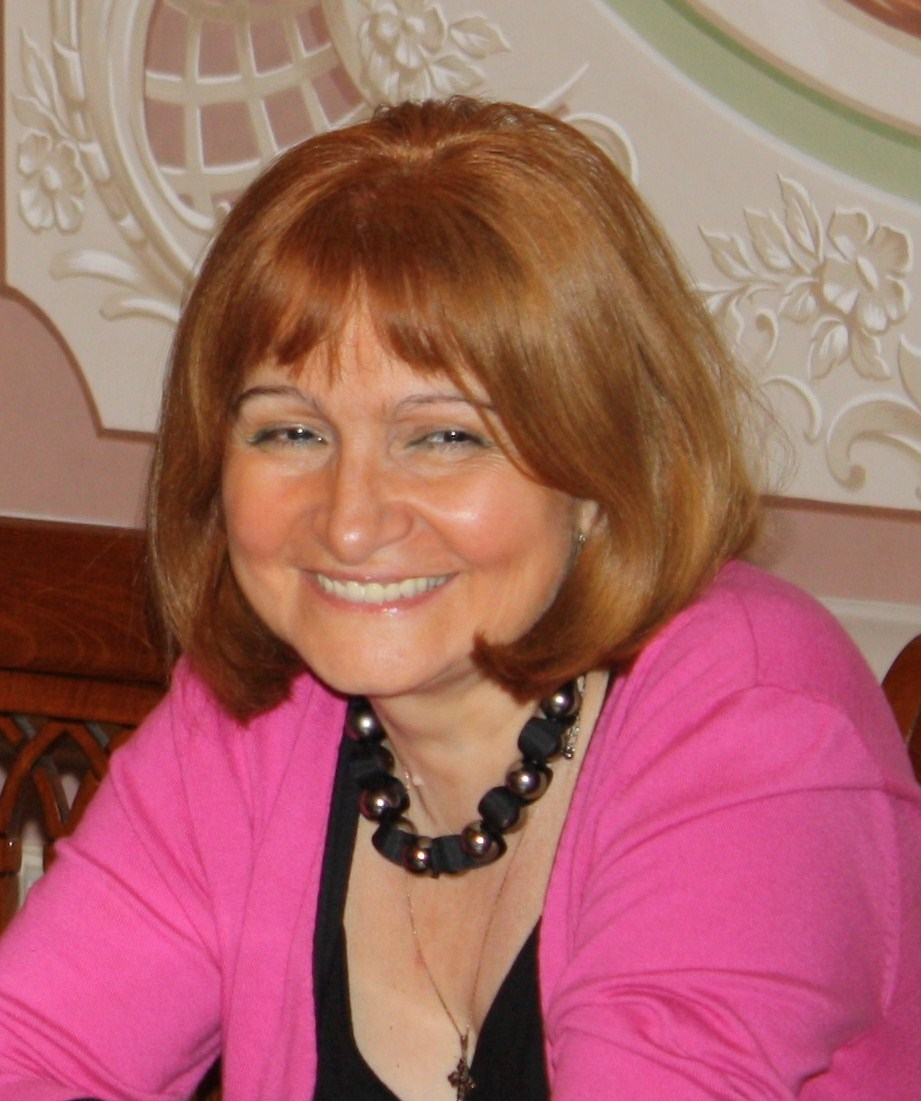
- Manana Anasashvili
- Born: Manana Anasashvili; 16 June 1952 (age 73); Tbilisi, Georgia
- Occupations: Film director, screenwriter, cinematographer, theatre director
- Years active: 1980 – present

Manana Anasashvili (Georgian: მანანა ანასაშვილი; born 16 June 1952) is a Georgian film director, theatre director, Professor, Expert of National Endowment for Democracy (NED), Head of Georgian Shakespeare Association, and Head of International Relations at Georgian Film Academy.

== Biography ==
Manana Anasashvili was born on June 16, 1952. Mother - Tina Bakhia, Doctor-Therapist (1921–1961); Father - Nikoloz Anasashvili, Educator (1920–1979).

In 1969 She graduated from Tbilisi 42nd Ilia Vekua Mathematical School with honors (Gold Medal). While at high school, She became the author and proved mathematical theorem "Determining the last digit of a new number obtained by taking any number into any exponent".

In 1975 she graduated from Tbilisi State Medical University with the degree of Doctor-Therapist. Concurrently with the medical school, She studied Art History at the Faculty of Arts at Tbilisi State University (graduated with honors in 1976). After finishing the medical school, she worked as a doctor for several years.

In 1981 Manana Anasashvili graduated with honors from faculty of Theatre Directing at Shota Rustaveli Theatre and Film University (Lily Ioseliani's studio). Her diploma Stage Production at the Tumanishvili Film Actors Theatre, In The Dark Room (1982) had a very successful run and was periodically staged at the Tumanishvili theatre for 23 years (one of the longest theater production runs in Georgian theatre history).

During 1981–2001 and 2003–2005, She worked as an assistant professor and then as a full professor at the Shota Rustaveli Theatre and Film University, leading courses of TV/Film Directing and Acting. During 1983-1985 and 1988-2001 periods she worked as a TV/director and the host of TV-show Kinonostalgia at the Georgian Public Broadcasting Company.

Between 1985 and 2001 She worked at the Georgian Film Studio Kartuli Pilmi as a cast director and then as a film director. During this period, she worked as a cast-director for an 69th Academy Awards nominated film A Chef in Love by Nana Jorjadze.

In 2003 She graduated from the University of Wisconsin–Madison, USA with MA in Arts Administration. At the same time, she was leading the undergraduate course of Acting by Stanislavski at the same university.

In 2005 She won Scholarship from Bureau of Educational and Cultural Affairs of US State department of State and Bradley Foundation scholarship for faculty development program in Liberal Arts teaching methodology and spent one semester as a visiting scholar at the Johns Hopkins University, USA. The same time she was invited as a guest lecturer to teach acting by Stanislavski at George Washington University, USA.

Since 2005 she has been a professor of Michigan State University, Ilia State University and AGILE (American-Georgian Initiative for Liberal Education) Joint undergraduate program Free Sciences, leading several Interdisciplinary courses.

In 2012 She has been consulting as an expert of the National Endowment for Democracy (NED) at the NED Youth for Democracy Project.

Between 2013 and 2015 she was the Deputy Head of the Georgian Union of Cinematographers. Since 2019 Manana Anasasjvili is heading the International Relations of Georgian Film Academy.

Since June 2020 She is a Public Speaking and Voice Trainer at Euronews Georgia.

== Publications ==
- The Peculiarities of Creative Thinking in the Television News, The Magazine of Researches in Arts Science; N 2 (31), 2008
- TV News in the Postmodern World, The Magazine "Theatre and Film Studies Works", N7 (26) Vol.2-2007
- Arthur Miller’s Last Play and the Contemporary Reality TV Show, The Magazine "Theatre and Life"; Vol.5-6/2006
- Postmodern Fragmentation in TV, The Magazine "Theatre and Life"; Vol.1/2007
- Liberal Education and the First Steps of American-Georgian Initiative for Liberal Education, The Magazine "Paradigm"; N 4, 2007
- Television in the Postmodern Discourse, The Magazine "Theatre and Film Study Works"; N 10 (29), 2006
- TV Adds within the Context of Postmodern Culture, The Magazine "Theatre and Life"; Vol. 4/2006
- Directing of the Video Version of the Theatrical Performance, The Magazine "Theatre and Life"; Vol.3.2/2006
- Postmodernism and Post modernity, The Magazine "Theatre and Life"; Vol.2/2006
- The Development of TV Technologies — The Base of Evolution of TV Directing, The Magazine "Theatre and Film Studies Works", N7 (26) Vol.7-2/2006
- The Well-Known Voices from Voice of America, The newspaper "24 Hours", Vol.4. N:100, 2003
- Host and Guest by Vazha-Pshavela Staged in Washington DC, The newspaper "24 hours", Vol.5. N 163, 2002
- World Premiere of the Arthur Miller's New Play, The newspaper "24 Hours", Vol.4. N 137, 2002

== Major theatre and TV productions ==
- Spring Beyond the Shutters by Lasha Tabukashvili, Sokhumi Georgian Theatre, 1980
- The Dark Room, Mikheil Tumanishvili Film Actors Theatre, 1982
- Cilindro by Eduardo De Filippo, Theater of theatrical institute, 1983
- The Dragon by Eugene Schwartz, Tumanishvili Film Actors Theatre, 1984
- The Dark Room, Gori Academic Drama Theater, 1985
- Colored Balloons by Paolo Iashvili, Georgian Public Broadcasting, 1989 https://en.wikipedia.org/wiki/Georgian_Public_Broadcasting
- Poetry by Otar Chelidze, Georgian Public Broadcasting, 1990
- Mary's Child by Brothers Grimm, Georgian Public Broadcasting, 1999
- The Swineherd by Hans Christian Andersen, Children Television Theatre "Chikora", 2000

=== Filmography ===
- Peace Tree Festival (documentary), Company Kartuli Telefilmi, 1990
- Mkholod ertkhel (Only Once) (Feature), Georgian Film Studio Kartuli Filmi, 1994
- I'll Always Speak About Georgia (documentary), Company Kartuli Telefilmi, 1996
- Kapunia's Feast (Musical film), Company Kartuli Telefilmi, 2000
- Robiko Sturua (documentary), Georgian National Film Center, 2007

== Honours and awards ==
- 2005 - Bureau of Educational and Cultural Affairs of US State department of State and Bradley Foundation scholarship for faculty development program in Liberal Arts teaching methodology at Johns Hopkins University, USA
- 2002-2003 - JFD Program Scholarship funded from Bureau of Educational and Cultural Affairs of US State department for studying at the University of Wisconsin–Madison
- Golden Eagle for Best Debut (Film Only Once) at The Black Sea International Film Festival, 1993
- Audience Award at St Petersburg International Film Festival "White nights of St. Petersburg", for Only Once, 1994
- Special prize of the Minsk International Film Festival for Casting, film Only Once, 1994
- Special prize at the Babelsberg International Film Festival, 1994
- Prize at the Kyiv International Film Festival "Molodist", 1995
