= List of Georgian films of the 1980s =

A list of the films produced in the cinema of Georgia in the 1980s, ordered by year of release:

| Title | Director | Cast | Genre | Studio/notes |
|---|---|---|---|---|
1980
1981
1982
1983
| Blue Mountains | | | | |
1984
| Day Is Longer Than Night | Lana Gogoberidze | | | Entered into the 1984 Cannes Film Festival |
1985
| The Journey of a Young Composer | Georgiy Shengelaya | | | Shengelaya won the Silver Bear for Best Director at Berlin. |
| The Legend of Suram Fortress | Sergei Parajanov | | | |
1986
| Robinsonada or My English Grandfather | Nana Dzhordzhadze | | | Screened at the 1987 Cannes Film Festival |
1987
| Monanieba | Tengiz Abuladze | | | Won three awards at the 1987 Cannes Film Festival |
1988
| Ashik Kerib | Sergei Parajanov | | | |
1989
