= List of Rwandan submissions for the Academy Award for Best International Feature Film =

Best International Feature Film submissions from Rwanda

Highlights
- Debut: 2026
- Submissions: 1
- Nominations: none
- Oscar winners: none

Rwanda has submitted films for the Academy Award for Best International Feature Film since 2026. The award is handed out annually by the United States Academy of Motion Picture Arts and Sciences to a feature-length motion picture produced outside the United States that contains primarily non-English dialogue.

Rwanda first ever submission, Ben'Imana, was directed by Marie Clémentine Dusabejambo.

== Submissions ==
The Academy of Motion Picture Arts and Sciences has invited the film industries of various countries to submit their best film for the Academy Award for Best International Feature Film since 1956. The International Feature Film Committee oversees the process and reviews all the submitted films. Following this, they vote via secret ballot to determine the five nominees for the award.

The country first submission, Ben'Imana (2026), directed by Marie Clémentine Dusabejambo, won the Caméra d'Or for Best Debut Film at the 2026 Cannes Film Festival.

Below is a list of the films that have been submitted by Rwanda by year, and its respective Academy Awards ceremony:

Year (Ceremony)	Film title used in nomination	Original title	Language(s)	Director	Result
2026 (99th)	Ben'Imana		Kinyarwanda	Marie Clémentine Dusabejambo	Pending

== See also ==
- List of Academy Award winners and nominees for Best International Feature Film
- List of Academy Award-winning foreign language films
