= Ben'Imana =

2026 drama film by Marie Clémentine Dusabejambo

- International release poster
- Directed by: Marie Clémentine Dusabejambo
- Written by: Marie Clémentine Dusabejambo; Delphine Agut
- Produced by: Samantha Biffot
- Starring: Clémentine U. Nyirinkindi; Isabelle Kabano; Kesia Kelly Nishimwe; Leocadie Uwabeza; Antoinette Uwamahoro; Aime Valens Tuyisenge
- Cinematography: Mostafa El Kashef
- Edited by: Nadia ben Rachid
- Music by: Igor Mabano
- Production companies: Ejo Cine.Ltd; Princesse M Prod; Les Films du Bilboquet; Duo Film
- Distributed by: Alexander; MK2 Films
- Release date: 19 May 2026 (Cannes)
- Running time: 96 minutes
- Countries: Rwanda; Gabon; France; Norway; Ivory Coast
- Language: Kinyarwanda

Ben'Imana is a 2026 drama film directed by Marie Clémentine Dusabejambo, co-written with Delphine Agut. A co-production of Rwanda, Gabon, France, Norway, and Ivory Coast, it stars Clémentine U. Nyirinkindi as Vénéranda, a survivor of the 1994 Rwandan genocide against the Tutsi, involved in community-led justice and reconciliation eighteen years later.

The film had its world premiere in the Un Certain Regard section of the 2026 Cannes Film Festival on 19 May, where it won the Caméra d'Or. It was the first film directed by a Rwandan filmmaker to be included in the festival's official selection. It was also selected as the first ever Rwandan entry for the Best International Feature Film at the 99th Academy Awards.

== Premise ==
Set in Rwanda in 2012, the film follows Vénéranda, a survivor of the 1994 genocide against the Tutsi, who is involved in community-led justice and reconciliation. As she faces mounting pressures in her work, a personal crisis within her family forces her to confront the limits of her beliefs.

== Cast ==
- Clémentine U. Nyirinkindi as Vénéranda
- Isabelle Kabano as Suzanne
- Kesia Kelly Nishimwe as Tina
- Léocadie Uwabeza as Madeleine
- Antoinette Uwamahoro as Victoire
- Aime Valens Tuyisenge as Karangwa

== Production ==
Ben'Imana was developed through a series of international development labs and co-production programs, including Lim – Less Is More programme in 2020, La Fabrique Cinéma, the Atlas Workshops at the Marrakech International Film Festival, and Ouaga Film Lab.

The project received additional financial backing from the Berlinale World Cinema Fund, the Norwegian Sørfond, and the Red Sea Film Festival's Souk Awards.

The film is produced by Ejo Cine.Ltd (Rwanda) and Princesse M Prod (Gabon), in co-production with Les Films du Bilboquet (France) and Duo Film (Norway). The project was presented at La Fabrique Cinéma at the Cannes Film Festival in 2022 by director Marie-Clémentine Dusabejambo and producer Samantha Biffot. International sales are handled by MK2 Films.

== Release ==
Ben'Imana had its world premiere at the Un Certain Regard section of the 2026 Cannes Film Festival, one of three African films selected for the section in 2026. It was presented at the Sydney Film Festival on 11 June 2026 in Official Competition, where it competed for The Sydney Film Prize. It was also part of Horizons section of the 60th Karlovy Vary International Film Festival, where it was screened from 3 July to 8 July 2026. The film had its North American Premiere in 'Centrepiece' at the 2026 Toronto International Film Festival on 15 September 2026. It will also compete in the First Feature Competition at the 2026 BFI London Film Festival on 12 October 2026. It will be part of Black Perspectives 30th Anniversary at the 62nd Chicago International Film Festival and screened in 'Departure' section on 17 October 2026, and presented in the Best of 2026 section of the 21st Rome Film Festival in October 2026.

== Reception ==
=== Critical response ===
On review aggregator website Rotten Tomatoes, the film holds an approval rating of 100% based on 16 reviews, with an average rating of 8.6/10. On Metacritic, the film has a weighted average score of 80 out of 100, based on six critics, indicating "generally favorable" reviews.

=== Accolades ===
Award	Date of ceremony	Category	Recipient(s)	Result	Ref.
Cannes Film Festival	23 May 2026	Camera d'Or	Ben'Imana	Won	
Cannes Film Festival	23 May 2026	Un Certain Regard: FIPRESCI Prize	Ben'Imana	Won	
BFI London Film Festival	18 October 2026	Sutherland Award	Marie-Clémentine Dusabejambo	Nominated	
Gotham Independent Film Awards	30 November 2026	Best International Feature	Marie Clémentine Dusabejambo, Samantha Biffot, Pierre-Adrien Ceccaldi, Marie Epiphanie Uwayezu	Pending	

== See also ==
- List of submissions to the 99th Academy Awards for Best International Feature Film
- List of Rwandan submissions for the Academy Award for Best International Feature Film
