= 1987 Cannes Film Festival =

- Official poster of the 40th Cannes Film Festival, featuring an original illustration by Henri Cueco
- Opening film: A Man in Love
- Closing film: Aria
- Location: Cannes, France
- Founded: 1946
- Awards: Palme d'Or: Under the Sun of Satan
- No. of films: 20 (In Competition)
- Festival date: 7 May 1987 – 19 May 1987
- Website: festival-cannes.com/en

Cannes Film Festival
- 1988 1986

The 40th Cannes Film Festival took place from 7 to 19 May 1987. French-Italian actor Yves Montand served as jury president for the main competition.

French filmmaker Maurice Pialat won the Palme d'Or, the festival's top prize, for the drama film Under the Sun of Satan, a choice which critics considered "highly controversial" and the prize was given under the jeers of the public. Pialat is quoted to have retorted "You don't like me? Well, let me tell you that I don't like you either!"

The festival opened with A Man in Love by Diane Kurys, and closed with Aria by Robert Altman, Bruce Beresford, Bill Bryden, Jean-Luc Godard, Derek Jarman, Franc Roddam, Nicolas Roeg, Ken Russell, Charles Sturridge and Julien Temple.

== Juries ==
=== Main competition ===
- Yves Montand, French-Italian actor and singer - Jury President
- Theo Angelopoulos, Greek director, screenwriter, and producer
- Gérald Calderon, French director
- Danièle Heymann, French film critic and journalist
- Elem Klimov, Soviet director
- Norman Mailer, American novelist
- Nicola Piovani, Italian composer
- Jerzy Skolimowski, Polish director, screenwriter, and actor
- Jeremy Thomas, British producer

=== Camera d'Or ===
- Maurice Le Roux, French composer and conductor - Jury President
- Freddy Buache, journalist
- Emmanuel Carriau, cinephile
- Michel Ciment, French film critic
- M. Hidalgo, journalist
- Bernard Jubard
- Michael Kutza, cinephile
- Claude Weisz, French filmmaker

== Official selection ==
=== In Competition ===
The following feature films competed for the Palme d'Or:

English title	Original title	Director(s)	Production country
Aria (closing film)		Robert Altman, Bruce Beresford, Bill Bryden, Jean-Luc Godard, Derek Jarman, Franc Roddam, Nicolas Roeg, Ken Russell, Charles Sturridge, Julien Temple	United Kingdom
Barfly		Barbet Schroeder	United States
The Belly of an Architect		Peter Greenaway	United Kingdom, Italy
Chronicle of a Death Foretold	Cronaca di una morte annunciata	Francesco Rosi	Italy, France, Colombia
Dark Eyes	Очи чёрные	Nikita Mikhalkov	Soviet Union, Italy
The Family	La famiglia	Ettore Scola	Italy
Field of Honor	Champ d'honneur	Jean-Pierre Denis	France
The Glass Menagerie		Paul Newman	United States
Repentance	მონანიება	Tengiz Abuladze	Soviet Union
The Last Manuscript	Az utolsó kézirat	Károly Makk	Hungary
A Man in Love (opening film)	Un homme amoureux	Diane Kurys	France, Italy, United Kingdom
Pierre and Djemila	Pierre et Djemila	Gérard Blain	France
Prick Up Your Ears		Stephen Frears	United Kingdom
Shinran: Path to Purity	親鸞 白い道	Rentarō Mikuni	Japan
Shy People		Andrei Konchalovsky	United States
Subway to the Stars	Um Trem para as Estrelas	Carlos Diegues	Brazil
Under the Sun of Satan	Sous le soleil de Satan	Maurice Pialat	France
Wings of Desire	Der Himmel über Berlin	Wim Wenders	West Germany, France
Yeelen		Souleymane Cissé	Mali, Burkina Faso, France, West Germany
Zegen	女衒	Shōhei Imamura	Japan

=== Un Certain Regard ===
The following films were selected for the Un Certain Regard section:

English title	Original title	Director(s)	Production country
A Gathering of Old Men		Volker Schlöndorff	United States, West Germany
A Month in the Country		Pat O'Connor	United Kingdom
And the Pursuit of Happiness	La poursuite du bonheur	Louis Malle	United States
Babette's Feast	Babettes Gaestebud	Gabriel Axel	Denmark
Blind Chance	Przypadek	Krzysztof Kieślowski	Poland
The Distant Land	Das weite Land	Luc Bondy	Austria, West Germany, France
Epidemic		Lars von Trier	Denmark
A Girl from Hunan	湘女萧萧	Xie Fei and U Lan	China
Hôtel de France		Patrice Chéreau	France
The House of Bernarda Alba	La casa de Bernarda Alba	Mario Camus	Spain
Hud		Vibeke Løkkeberg	Norway
Iron Earth, Copper Sk	Yer demir gök bakir	Zülfü Livaneli	Turkey
Italian Postcards	Cartoline italiane	Memè Perlini	Italy
Jenatsch		Daniel Schmid	Switzerland, France
Robinsonada or My English Grandfather	რობინზონიადა ანუ ჩემი ინგლისელი პაპა	Nana Jorjadze	Soviet Union
The Serpent's Way	Ormens väg på hälleberget	Bo Widerberg	Sweden
A Simple Death	Простая смерть	Alexander Kaidanovsky	Soviet Union
Sofia		Alejandro Doria	Argentina
Someone to Love		Henry Jaglom	United States
A Successful Man	Un hombre de éxito	Humberto Solás	Cuba

=== Out of Competition ===
The following films were selected to be screened out of competition:

English title	Original title	Director(s)	Production country
Aida		Clemente Fracassi	Italy
The Black Cannon Incident	黑砲事件	Huang Jianxin	China
Boris Godunov	Борис Годунов	Vera Stroyeva	Soviet Union
Caméra arabe		Férid Boughedir	Tunisia
Le cinéma dans les yeux		Laurent Jacob and Gilles Jacob	France
Don Quixote (1933)	Don Quichotte	G. W. Pabst	France, United Kingdom
Feathers		John Ruane	Australia
Intervista		Federico Fellini	Italy
Good Morning, Babylon	Buongiorno Babilonia	Paolo and Vittorio Taviani	Italy, France
Hôtel du Paradis		Jana Boková	France
L'Inhumaine (1924)		Marcel L'Herbier	France
Louise (1939)		Abel Gance	France
Macbeth		Claude d'Anna	France
The Medium	Il medium	Gian Carlo Menotti	Italy
Pagliacci		Franco Zeffirelli	Italy
Radio Days		Woody Allen	United States
Raising Arizona		Joel and Ethan Coen	United States
Return of a Citizen	عودة مواطن	Mohamed Khan	Egypt
Slam Dance		Wayne Wang	United Kingdom, United States
Something Wild		Jonathan Demme	United States
The Sentimental Bloke (1918)		Raymond Longford	Australia
The Whales of August		Lindsay Anderson	United States
Tough Guys Don't Dance		Norman Mailer	United States
Wahnfried	Richard und Cosima	Peter Patzak	West Germany, France

=== Short Films Competition ===
The following short films competed for the Short Film Palme d'Or:

- Doigté by Gyula Nagy
- Imagine by Zbigniew Rybczynski
- L'homme Qui Plantait des Arbres by Frédéric Back
- La Mort Soudaine et Prématurée du Colonel K.K. by Milos Radovic
- The Four Wishes (Les Quatre Vœux) by Michel Ocelot
- Maestro by Alex Zamm
- Palisade by Laurie McInnes
- Pleines de Grâce by Nicole Van Goethem
- Your Face by Bill Plympton
- Transatlantique by Bruce Krebs
- Academy Leader Variations by Martial Wannaz, Krzysztof Kiwerski, Stanislaw Lenartowicz, David Ehrlich, Jane Aaron, Skip Battaglia, Paul Glabicki, George Griffin, Al Jarnow, Piotr Dumala, Daniel Suter, Yan Ding Xian, A. D., Hu Jin Qing, Lin Wen Xiao, He Yu Men, Chang Guang Xi, Georges Schwizgebel, Claude Luyet, Jerzy Kucia

== Parallel sections ==
=== International Critics' Week ===
The following feature films were screened for the 26th International Critics' Week (26e Semaine de la Critique):

- Dead Man's Letters (Pisma myortvogo cheloveka) by Konstantin Lopushansky (Soviet Union)
- Du mich auch by Anja Franke, Dani Levy, Helmut Berger (West Germany, Switzerland)
- Ngati by Barry Barclay (New Zealand)
- Yam Daabo by Idrissa Ouedraogo (Burkina Faso)
- The Tree We Hurt (To dendro pou pligoname) by Dimos Avdeliodis (Greece)
- Angelus novus by Pasquale Misuraca (Italy)
- Où que tu sois by Alain Bergala (France)

=== Directors' Fortnight ===
The following films were screened for the 1987 Directors' Fortnight (Quinzaine des Réalizateurs):

- Diary of a Mad Old Man by Lili Rademakers
- Dilan by Erden Kiral
- Guardian Angel (Andjeo Cuvar) by Goran Paskaljevic
- Heaven by Diane Keaton
- Home of the Brave by Laurie Anderson
- A Hungarian Fairy Tale (Hol Volt, Hol Nem Volt) by Gyula Gazdag
- I've Heard the Mermaids Singing by Patricia Rozema
- Made in U.S.A. by Ken Friedman
- Malom a pokolban by Gyula Maar
- Mascara by Patrick Conrad
- Matewan by John Sayles
- Night Zoo (Un zoo la nuit) by Jean-Claude Lauzon
- Panorama du cinéma sud-africain indépendant (director not stated)
- The Photograph (I Photographia) by Nicos Papatakis
- Rita, Sue and Bob Too by Alan Clarke
- Shadows in Paradise (Varjoja paratiisissa) by Aki Kaurismäki
- Street Smart by Jerry Schatzberg
- The Surfer by Frank Shields
- Wedding in Galilee (Urs al-Jalil) by Michel Khleifi
- Wish You Were Here by David Leland

== Official Awards ==
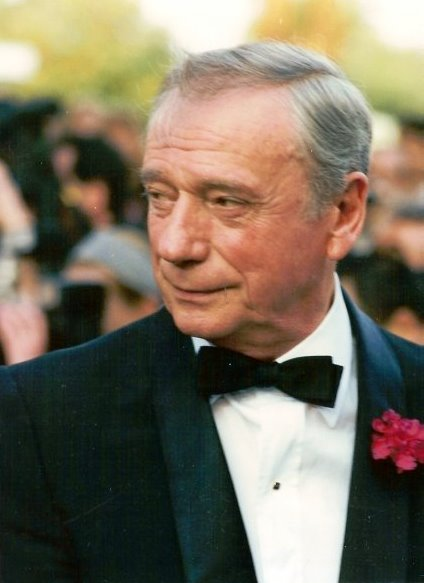
Yves Montand, Jury President

=== In Competition ===
- Palme d'Or: Under the Sun of Satan by Maurice Pialat
- Grand Prix: Repentance by Tengiz Abuladze
- Best Director: Wim Wenders for Wings of Desire
- Best Actress: Barbara Hershey for Shy People
- Best Actor: Marcello Mastroianni for Dark Eyes
- Best Artistic Contribution: Stanley Myers (composer) for Prick Up Your Ears
- Jury Prize:
  - Shinran: Path to Purity by Rentarō Mikuni
  - Yeelen by Souleymane Cissé
- 40th Anniversary Prize: Intervista by Federico Fellini

=== Caméra d'Or ===
- Robinsonada or My English Grandfather by Nana Djordjadze

=== Short Film Palme d'Or ===
- Palisade by Laurie McInnes
- Second Prize: Academy Leader Variations by David Ehrlich
- Third Prize: La Mort Soudaine et Prématurée du Colonel K.K. by Milos Radovic

== Independent awards ==
=== FIPRESCI Prizes ===
- Repentance by Tengiz Abuladze (In competition)
- Wedding in Galilee by Michel Khleifi (Directors' Fortnight)
- Wish You Were Here by David Leland (Directors' Fortnight)

=== Commission Supérieure Technique ===
- Technical Grand Prize: Le cinéma dans les yeux by Gilles Jacob and Laurent Jacob

=== Prize of the Ecumenical Jury ===
- Repentance by Tengiz Abuladze
  - Special Mention:
    - Babette's Feast by Gabriel Axel
    - Yeelen by Souleymane Cissé

=== Award of the Youth ===
- Foreign Film: I've Heard the Mermaids Singing by Patricia Rozema

== Media ==
- INA: Anniversary evening: the Festival is 40 years old (commentary in French)
- INA: List of winners of the 1987 festival (commentary in French)
