= Rusudan Bolkvadze =

Georgian actress

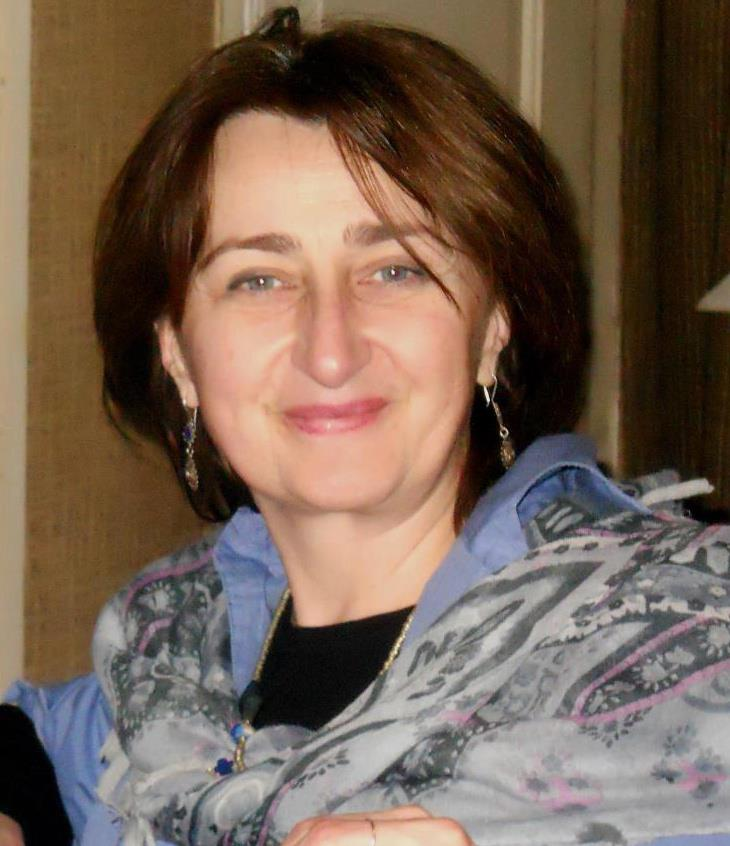
- Rusudan Bolkvadze
- Born: November 6, 1959 (age 66); Tbilisi, Georgia (Country)
- Education: Shota Rustaveli Theatre and Film University
- Occupation: Actress at Tumanishvili Film Actors Theatre
- Parent(s): Giorgi Bolkvadze; Guranda Grigorashvili
- Website: rusudanbolkvadze.com

Rusudan Bolkvadze (born November 6, 1959) is a Georgian actress. She graduated from 55th State School in Tbilisi and went to Shota Rustaveli Theatre and Film State University of Georgia. In 1980 she enrolled at the Studio led by the Georgian director Mikheil Tumanishvili. Currently she is one of the leading actresses in Tumanishvili Film Actors Theatre.

== Filmography ==
- My Happy Family (ჩემი ბედნიერი ოჯახი) - 2017
- Zone of Conflict (კონფლიქტის ზონა) - 2009
- Felicita (ბედნიერება) - 2009
- Since Otar Left (რაც ოთარი წავიდა) - 2003
- Gmerto, Risi Gulistvis (ღმერთო, რისი გულისათვის) - 2003
- Ra Gatsinebs? (რა გაცინებს?) - 1996
- Leonardo (ლეონარდო) - 1993
- Tskhovreba Don Kikhotisa da Sanchosi (ცხოვრება, დონ კიხოტისა და სანჩოსი) - 1989
- Vamekhi Modis (ვამეხი მოდის) - 1988
- Robinzoniada, anu chemi ingliseli Papa (რობინზონიადა ანუ ჩემი ინგლისელი პაპა) - 1986
- Modi, Vilaparakot (მოდი ვილაპარაკოთ) - 1986
- Sizmara (სიზმარა) - 1986
- Mejlisi Gakidul Sakhlshi (მეჯლისი გაყიდულ სახლში) - 1985
- Aqedana da Shenamde (აქედანა და შენამდე) - 1984
- Arachveulebrivi Reisi (არაჩვეულებრივი რეისი) - 1982
- Banaki (ბანაკი) - 1982
