= A Man in Love (1987 film) =

1987 film

- French theatrical poster
- Directed by: Diane Kurys
- Written by: Diane Kurys; Israel Horovitz; Olivier Schatzky
- Produced by: Diane Kurys
- Starring: Peter Coyote; Greta Scacchi
- Cinematography: Bernard Zitzermann
- Edited by: Joële Van Effenterre
- Music by: Georges Delerue
- Distributed by: Cinecom Pictures
- Release date: 7 May 1987 (Cannes)
- Running time: 125 minutes
- Countries: France; Italy; United Kingdom
- Languages: English; French; Italian

A Man in Love (French: Un homme amoureux, Italian: Un uomo innamorato) is a 1987 French-Italian-British drama film directed by Diane Kurys. Her first English language film, it was entered into the 1987 Cannes Film Festival as the opening night film.

== Plot ==
Jane Steiner is an English-born actress considering giving up on her unfulfilling career as an actress to become a writer. She lives in France with her French mother Julia and English father Harry. By chance, during an excursion to Rome with her journalist father, she is offered a small part in an American film set in the 1950s about Cesare Pavese as Gabriella, Pavese's love interest. The lead role is played by Steve Elliot, a charming American who is passionate about the writer he is playing, although his work is unknown in the United States. He is married to Susan, who is at home in New York City but falls in love with his co-star Jane on the set. After meeting Steve, Jane abandons her relationship with her French lover and friend Bruno.

After Jane's part in the movie is finished, she moves into Steve's rented villa on the outskirts of Rome while he continues to work on the film at the studio. The two of them soon become lovers and embark on a torrid affair, which is almost discovered when Susan shows up one day in Rome to see Steve on a surprise visit with their children; however, Steve's best friend Michael Pozner manages to sneak Jane out of the house before she is discovered. Complications for Jane continue when Bruno tracks her down to Rome and eventually discovers the affair. In a jealous rage, he leaks the affair to the press just as Steve completes his work on the film. To makes things worse, Jane learns that her mother has terminal cancer and will die soon unless she returns to France quickly.

As the film comes to a close, Jane and Steve quietly end their romance since Steve has told Jane that he is unable to leave Susan or his family. Steve returns to America and Jane returns to France to be at her mother's side when she dies. After mourning the loss of her mother, Jane decides to embrace her future as a writer and in the final scene, she is writing her first book; it is a romance story loosely based on her relationship with Steve.

== Cast ==
- Peter Coyote as Steve Elliott
- Greta Scacchi as Jane Steiner
- Jamie Lee Curtis as Susan Elliott
- Claudia Cardinale as Julia Steiner
- Peter Riegert as Michael Pozner
- John Berry as Harry Steiner
- Vincent Lindon as Bruno Schlosser
- Jean Pigozzi as Dante Pizani
- Elia Katz as Sam
- Constantin Alexandrov as De Vitta
- Jean-Claude de Goros as Sandro
- Michele Melega as Paolo
- Jole Silvani as Olga

== Critical reception ==
Derek Malcolm of The Guardian gave a middling review in which he said that the central love triangle did not feel all that interesting. Roger Ebert of the Chicago Sun-Times gave it 3/4 stars, writing: "In many ways, the most interesting character in the movie is Riegert's yes-man, whose eyes show the pain he feels as he loyally cleans up after his boss's messes. Curtis comes on as a strong, confident woman who has everything figured out on an intellectual level, but who obviously has not had an emotional relationship with her husband for years. Scacchi walks a narrow line as a woman who still has not quite been disillusioned by the idea of romantic love, but who learns during the course of the movie the difference between what her parents felt and what is happening between herself and Coyote."
