= Caméra d'Or =

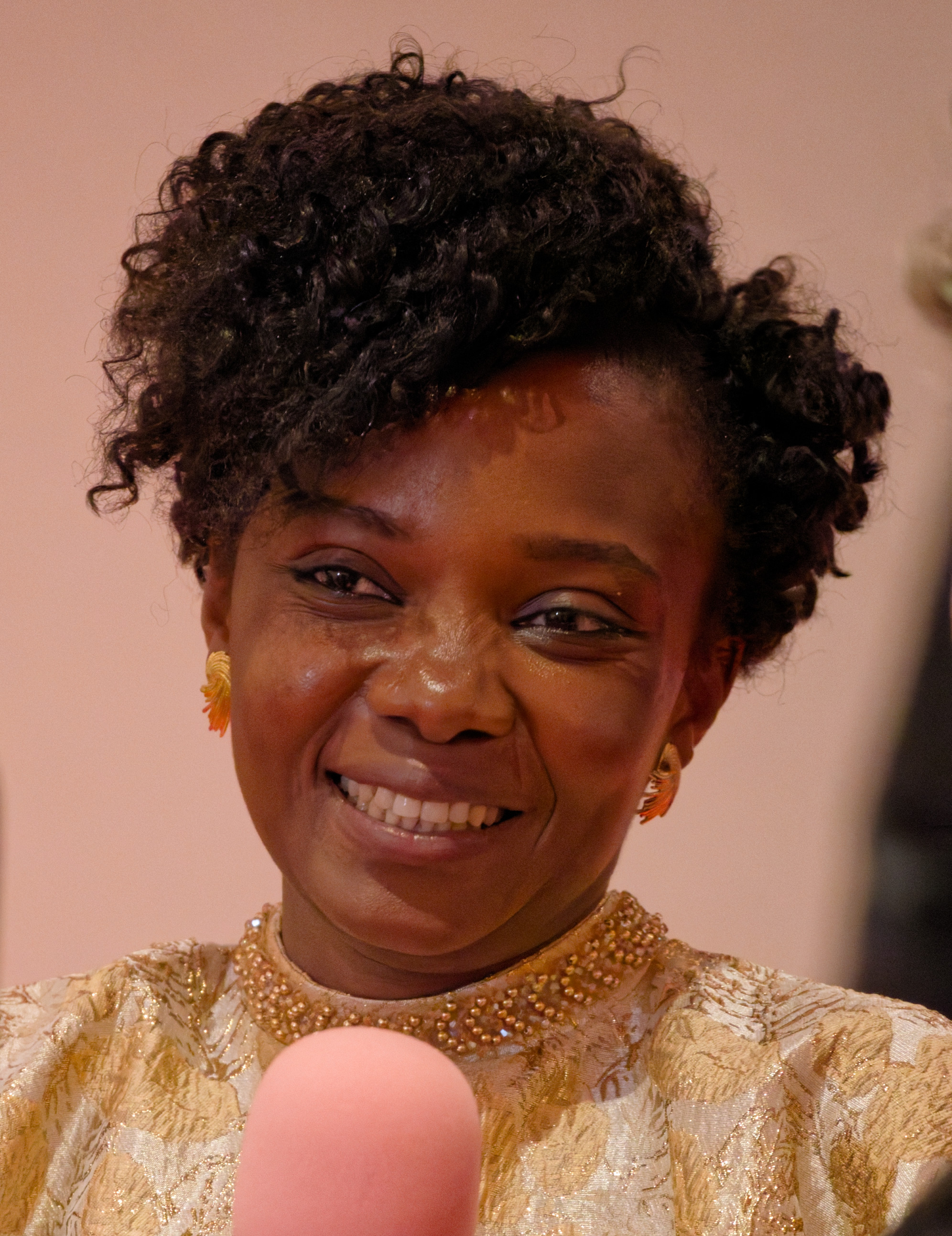
- 2026 recipient: Marie Clémentine Dusabejambo
- Awarded for: Best first feature film
- Presented by: Cannes Film Festival
- First award: 1978
- Currently held by: Ben'Imana by Marie Clémentine Dusabejambo (2026)
- Website: http://www.festival-cannes.com/

The Caméra d'Or ("Golden Camera") is an award of the Cannes Film Festival for the best first feature film presented in one of the Cannes selections (Official Selection, Directors' Fortnight or Critics' Week). The prize was created in 1978 by Gilles Jacob, and is awarded during the festival's closing ceremony by an independent jury.

Its most recent winner was Ben'Imana (2026) by Marie Clémentine Dusabejambo, at the 79th Cannes Film Festival.

Official logo

== Criteria ==
The rules define first film as "the first feature film for theatrical screening (whatever the format—fiction, documentary or animation) of 60 minutes or more in length, by a director who has not made another film of 60 minutes or more in length and released theatrically." Directors who have previously made only student thesis films or TV films can still compete in this category. The stated aim is to reveal a film "whose qualities emphasize the need to encourage the director to undertake a second film".

== Winners ==
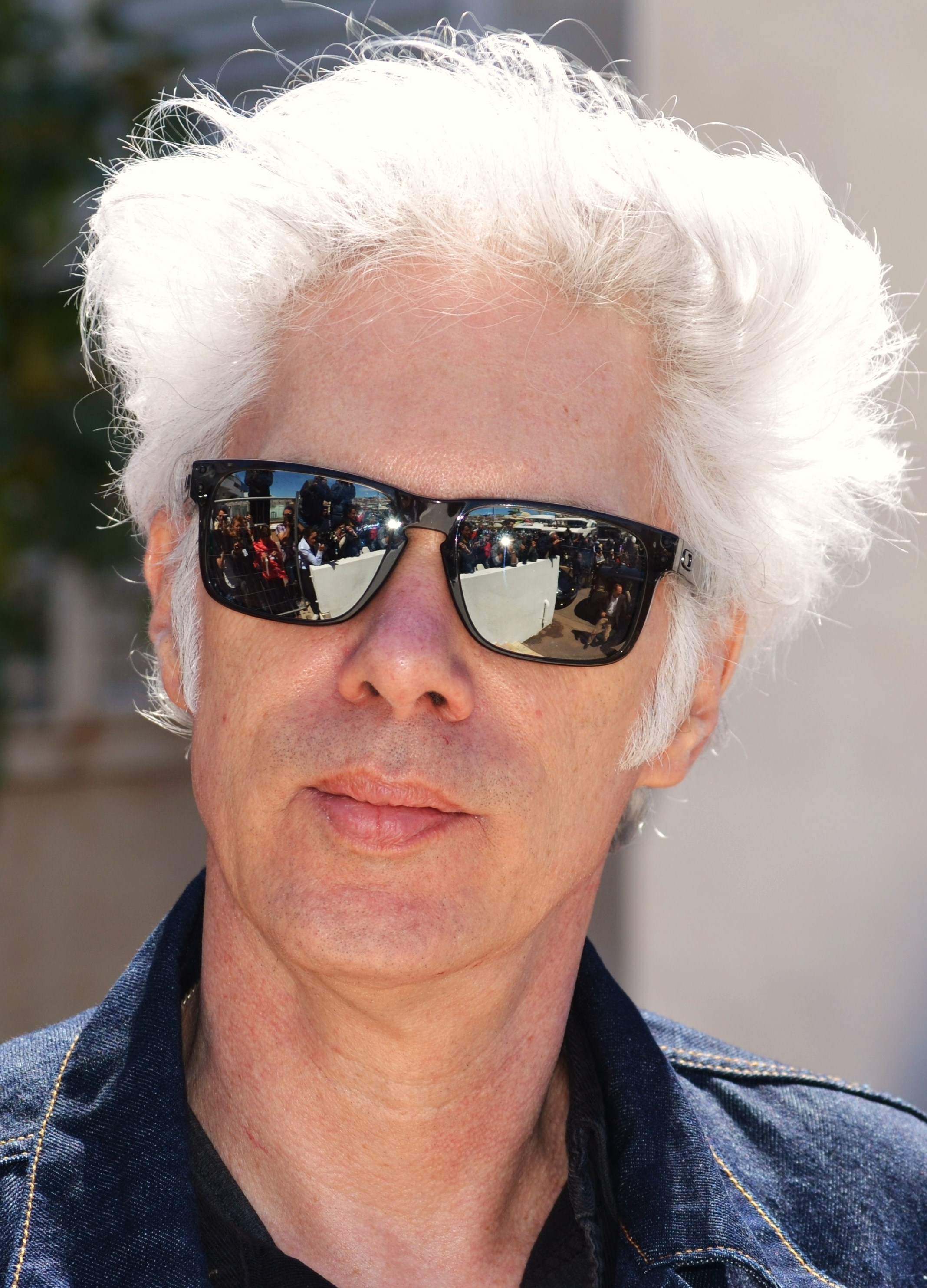
Jim Jarmusch won for Stranger Than Paradise (1984)

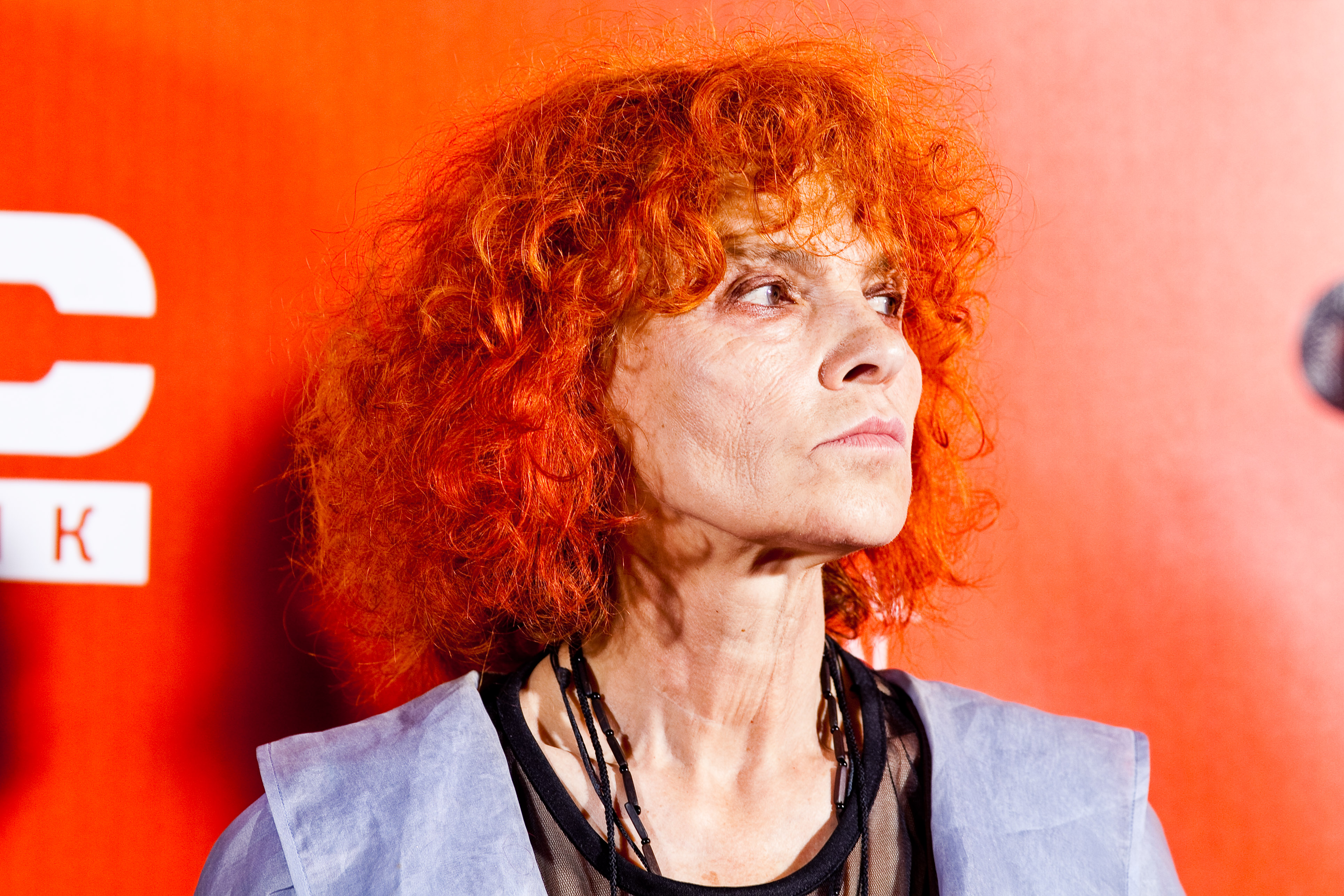
Nana Dzhordzhadze won for Robinson Crusoe in Georgia (1987)

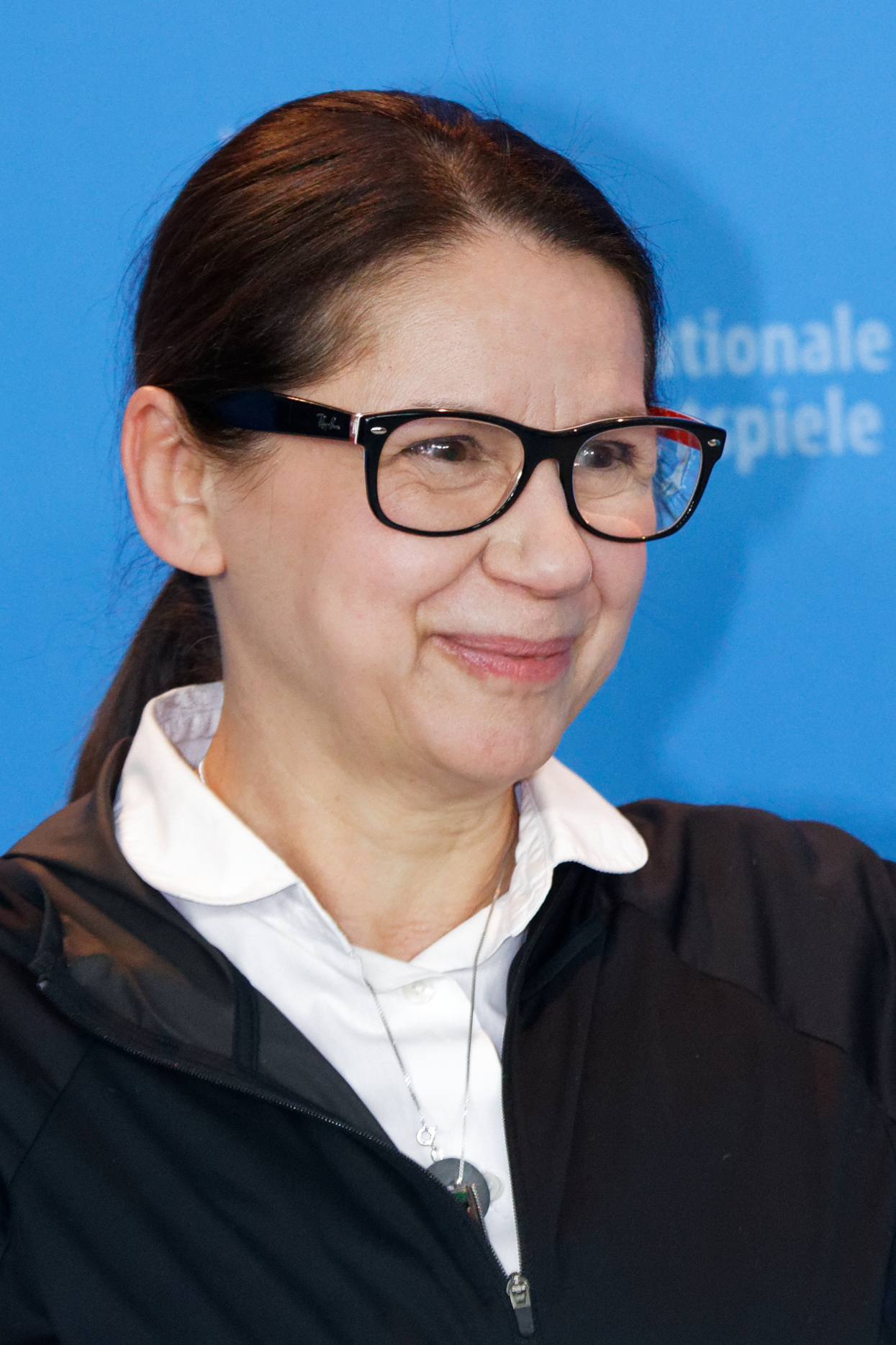
Ildikó Enyedi won for My 20th Century (1989)

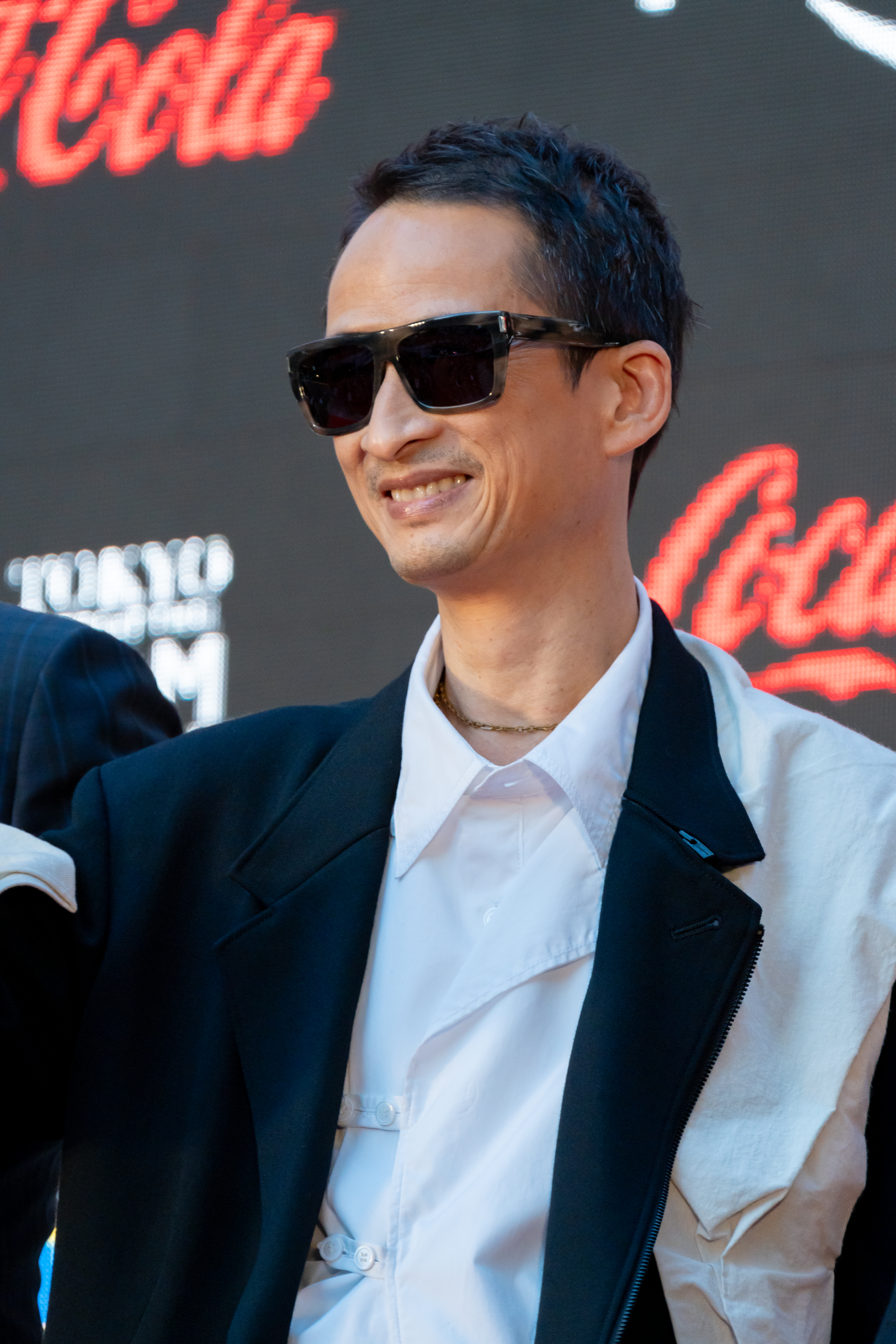
Tran Anh Hung won for The Scent of Green Papaya (1993)

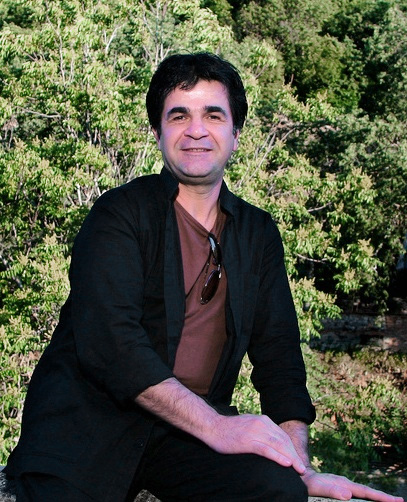
Jafar Panahi won for The White Balloon (1995)

Naomi Kawase won for Suzaku (1997)

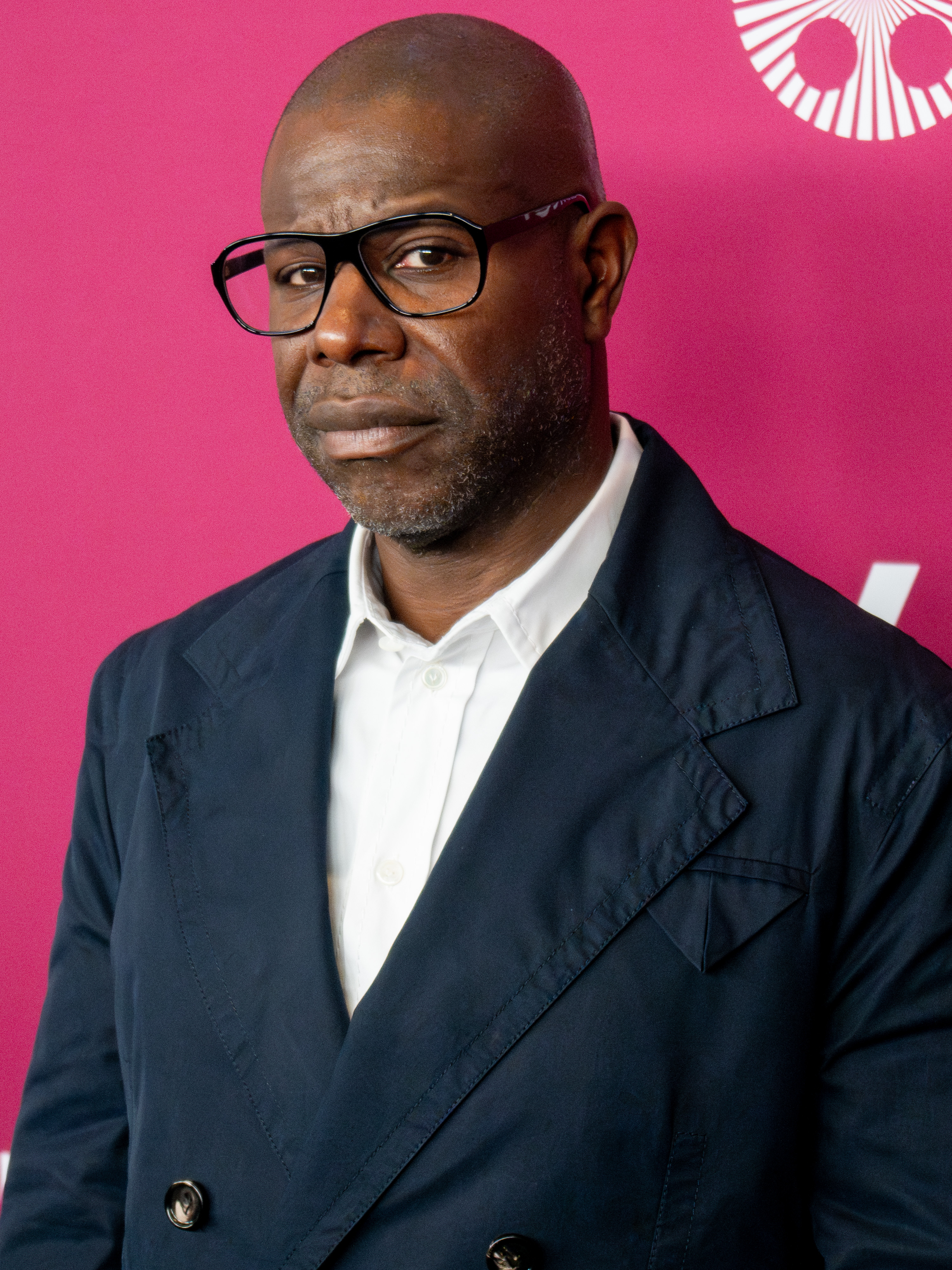
Steve McQueen won for Hunger (2008)

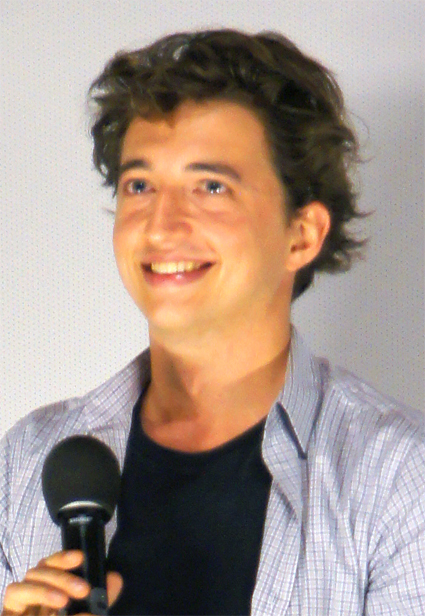
Benh Zeitlin won for Beasts of the Southern Wild (2012)

=== 1970s ===
Year	English title	Original title	Director	Production country
1978	Alambrista!		Robert M. Young	United States
1979	Northern Lights	Aurora Boreal	John Hanson and Rob Nilsson	United States

=== 1980s ===
Year	English title	Original title	Director	Production country
1980	Adrien's Story	Histoire d'Adrien	Jean-Pierre Denis	France
1981	Desperado City		Vadim Glowna	West Germany
1982	Half a Life	Mourir à 30 ans	Romain Goupil	France
1983	The Princess	Adj király katonát	Pál Erdőss	Hungary
1984	Stranger Than Paradise		Jim Jarmusch	United States
1985	Oriana		Fina Torres	Venezuela
1986	Noir et Blanc		Claire Devers	France
1987	Robinson Crusoe in Georgia	Robinzoniada, anu chemi ingliseli Papa	Nana Dzhordzhadze	Soviet Union
1988	Salaam Bombay!		Mira Nair	India
1989	My 20th Century	Az én XX. századom	Ildikó Enyedi	Hungary

=== 1990s ===
Year	English title	Original title	Director	Production country
1990	Freeze Die Come to Life	Замри, умри, воскресни!	Vitali Kanevsky	Soviet Union
1991	Toto the Hero	Toto le Héros	Jaco Van Dormael	Belgium
1992	Mac		John Turturro	United States
1993	The Scent of Green Papaya	Mùi đu đủ xanh	Tran Anh Hung	Vietnam
1994	Coming to Terms with the Dead	Petits arrangements avec les morts	Pascale Ferran	France
1995	The White Balloon	بادکنک سفيد	Jafar Panahi	Iran
1996	Love Serenade		Shirley Barrett	Australia
1997	Suzaku	萌の朱雀	Naomi Kawase	Japan
1998	Slam		Marc Levin	United States
1999	Marana Simhasanam		Murali Nair	India

=== 2000s ===
Year	English title	Original title	Director	Production country
2000	Djomeh		Hassan Yektapanah	Iran
2000	A Time for Drunken Horses	زمانی برای مستی اسب‌ها	Bahman Ghobadi	Iran
2001	Atanarjuat: The Fast Runner		Zacharias Kunuk	Canada
2002	Seaside	Bord de mer	Julie Lopes-Curval	France
2003	Reconstruction		Christoffer Boe	Denmark
2004	Or (My Treasure)		Keren Yedaya	Israel
2005	Me and You and Everyone We Know		Miranda July	United States
2005	The Forsaken Land	සුළඟ එනු පිණිස	Vimukthi Jayasundara	Sri Lanka
2006	12:08 East of Bucharest	A fost sau n-a fost?	Corneliu Porumboiu	Romania
2007	Jellyfish	מדוזות	Etgar Keret, Shira Geffen	Israel
2008	Hunger		Steve McQueen	United Kingdom
2009	Samson and Delilah		Warwick Thornton	Australia

=== 2010s ===
Year	English title	Original title	Director	Production country
2010	Año Bisiesto		Michael Rowe	Mexico
2011	Las Acacias		Pablo Giorgelli	Argentina
2012	Beasts of the Southern Wild		Benh Zeitlin	United States
2013	Ilo Ilo	爸媽不在家	Anthony Chen	Singapore
2014	Party Girl		Marie Amachoukeli, Claire Burger and Samuel Theis	France
2015	Land and Shade	La tierra y la sombra	César Augusto Acevedo	Colombia
2016	Divines		Houda Benyamina	France
2017	Montparnasse Bienvenue	Jeune femme	Léonor Serraille	France
2018	Girl		Lukas Dhont	Belgium
2019	Our Mothers	Nuestras madres	César Diaz	Guatemala

=== 2020s ===
Year	English title	Original title	Director	Production country
2021	Murina		Antoneta Alamat Kusijanović	Croatia
2022	War Pony		Riley Keough and Gina Gammell	United States
2023	Inside the Yellow Cocoon Shell	Bên trong vỏ kén vàng	Pham Thien An	Vietnam
2024	Armand		Halfdan Ullmann Tøndel	Norway
2025	The President's Cake	مملكة القصب	Hasan Hadi	Iraq, Qatar, United States
2026	Ben'Imana		Marie Clémentine Dusabejambo	Rwanda, Gabon, France, Norway, Ivory Coast

== Special Mention winners (Mention Spéciale) ==
Some years, some films that did not win the award have received a special mention for their outstanding quality as first features in Cannes. Also called Caméra d'Or — Mention or Caméra d'Or — Mention d'honneur.

Year	English title	Original title	Director(s)	Production country
1989	Waller's Last Trip	Wallers letzter Gang	Christian Wagner	Germany
1989	The Birth	പിറവി	Shaji N. Karun	India
1990	Time of the Servants	Čas sluhů	Irena Pavlásková	Czechoslovakia
1990	Farendj		Sabine Prenczina	France
1991	Proof		Jocelyn Moorhouse	Australia
1991	Sam & Me		Deepa Mehta	India
1993	Friends		Elaine Proctor	South Africa
1994	The Silences of the Palace	صمت القصور	Moufida Tlatli	Tunisia
1995	Denise Calls Up		Hal Salwen	United States
1997	The Life of Jesus	La Vie de Jésus	Bruno Dumont	France
2002	Japón		Carlos Reygadas	Mexico
2003	Osama		Siddiq Barmak	Afghanistan
2004	Passages	路程	Yang Chao	China
2004	Bitter Dream	خواب تلخ	Mohsen Amiryoussefi	Iran
2007	Control		Anton Corbijn	Netherlands
2008	Everybody Dies but Me	Все умрут, а я останусь	Valeriya Gai Germanika	Russia
2009	Ajami	عجمي	Scandar Copti and Yaron Shani	Israel
2022	Plan 75		Chie Hayakawa	Japan
2024	Mongrel	白衣蒼狗	Wei Liang Chiang and You Qiao Yin	Taiwan
2025	My Father's Shadow		Akinola Davies Jr.	United Kingdom, Ireland, Nigeria
