= Robinsonada or My English Grandfather =

1986 film

- Film poster
- Directed by: Nana Djordjadze
- Written by: Irakli Kvirikadze
- Starring: Janri Lolashvili
- Cinematography: Levan Paatashvili
- Release date: 1987
- Running time: 76 minutes
- Country: Soviet Union
- Languages: Georgian, Russian

Robinsonada or My English Grandfather (Georgian: რობინზონიადა ანუ ჩემი ინგლისელი პაპა; Russian: Робинзонада, или Мой английский дедушка, romanized: Robinzonada ili moy angliskiy dedushka; also known as Robinson Crusoe in Georgia) is a 1987 Soviet-Georgian comedy film directed by Nana Djordjadze. It was screened in the Un Certain Regard section at the 1987 Cannes Film Festival, where it won the Caméra d'Or.

== Plot ==
The main story of the film is framed as the reminiscences of an aged Georgian woman recalling her love affair, many years earlier, with an English telegraph worker. Shortly before the Soviet take-over of Georgia in 1921, Christopher Hughes is sent to rural Georgia to work on a telegraph line between the UK and India, which runs through Georgian territory. (This plot element is based on the true story of the Indo-European Telegraph Line, built by Siemens in 1868-1870, and operational until 1931). After the Red Army invades Georgia, the British employees are recalled, but the message ordering him to leave Georgia never reaches Hughes, who has fallen in love with Ana, a young Georgian woman living in a nearby village. Ana’s brother Nestor, however, is a local Bolshevik leader. There ensues a tense situation in which Hughes is caught between his love for Ana and his hostility toward her brother. Eventually, Hughes and Nestor are reconciled, but in the end both fall victim to a vengeful nobleman who has been dispossessed of his wealth by the new regime.

My English Grandfather is Nana Jorjadze's first major film, based on a screenplay by her husband Irakli Kvirikadze. The theme of the foreigner stranded in Soviet Georgia, who has a love affair with a local woman, resurfaces in Jorjadze's best-known film A Chef in Love. Other noteworthy features of the film include the music, composed by Enri Lolashvili, the brother of the actor Janri Lolashvili (who plays the role of Hughes in the film), and the use of foreigners (mostly students residing in Tbilisi at the time) to voice-over the bits of English dialogue that appear in the film. One of them supplied Hughes’ voice throughout the film, including those scenes where he speaks Georgian.

== Cast ==
- Janri Lolashvili
- Nineli Chankvetadze
- Guram Pirtskhalava
- Elgudzha Burduli
- Rusudan Bolkvadze
- Tiko Eliosidze
- Daredjan Kharshiladze
- Shalva Kherkheulidze
- Gia Lejava
- Yuri Kirs
