= Lovely Trash =

- Directed by: Mohsen Amiryoussefi
- Written by: Mohsen Amiryoussefi
- Produced by: Mohsen Amiryoussefi
- Starring: Shirin Yazdanbakhsh; Habib Rezaei; Hedyeh Tehrani; Negar Javaherian; Akbar Abdi; Saber Abar; Shahab Hosseini; Behrouz Vossoughi (not in the final released version)
- Cinematography: Touraj Aslani
- Edited by: Mostafa Kherghehpoush
- Music by: Afshin Azizi
- Distributed by: Nasim Saba
- Release date: 13 February 2019
- Running time: 88 minutes
- Country: Iran
- Language: Persian

Lovely Trash (Persian: آشغال‌های دوست‌داشتنی is a film directed, written, and produced by Mohsen Amiryoussefi, made in Iran in 2012. The film, which addresses the aftermath of the 2009 election protests, was denied a screening permit during Mahmoud Ahmadinejad's presidency and failed to secure one even during Hassan Rouhani's administration to be shown in the 32nd Fajr Film Festival. After a six-year ban, it finally received a screening permit in late February 2019 and gained wide public attention. In December 2019, it was revealed that Behrouz Vossoughi had portrayed a character in the original version of the film, which had contributed to its seven-year ban in Iran.

== Plot summary ==
The film portrays the events following the 2009 election. The story takes place in the house of an elderly woman who lives with her middle-aged cousin, Sima. On a day after the election, when protesters flood Tehran’s streets, several demonstrators, fleeing from security forces, take refuge in the woman’s home. After they leave, she notices a mark on her door. Following rumors, she is warned that authorities might search her house soon, so she is advised to remove any suspicious or problematic items from her home. This is where the story truly begins.

On a wall of the elderly woman’s room, there are four framed photographs of four men. The largest photo is of her husband, who was reportedly a supporter of Mohammad Mossadegh and was affected by the 1953 coup. Although he initially supported the monarchy, he later went on pilgrimage after the Iranian Revolution. The second photo is of her eldest son, who was martyred in the Iran–Iraq War. The third picture is of her brother, a member of a communist group who was executed during the conflicts of the 1980s. The fourth photo is of her youngest son, who studied abroad and now resides outside Iran.

The plot unfolds over the course of a single night, as the elderly woman imagines having a conversation with these four men, believing that the authorities will come for her the next day.

== Cast ==
- Shirin Yazdanbakhsh as Monir Khanum
- Behrouz Vosoughi (Scenes with his performance were removed from the film)
- Hedieh Tehrani, as Sima, a cousin of Monir and Mansour
- Akbar Abdi, as Monir's husband Mohammad Ali
- Saber Abar, as Amir, eldest son of Monir and Mohammad Ali
- Habib Rezaei, as Rahim, youngest son of Monir and Mohammad Ali
- Shahab Hosseini, as Mansour, Monir's brother
- Mirtaher Mazloumi, as officer
- Negar Javaherian, as a young woman and friend of Sima
- Houshang Ghavlou, as a neighbor of Monir

== Controversies ==
- In October 2014, the Cultural Commission of the Islamic Consultative Assembly sent a letter to the Ministry of Culture and Islamic Guidance, demanding that a release permit not be issued for this film and seven other films, which were labeled as "films related to the sedition." According to Ahmad Salek: "Some films, although they have received permits for their script and production, diverge during their making, and it is not in the system's interest to show them."
- In January 2016, Shahab Hosseini, one of the actors in this film, resigned from his position as an advisor to the 34th Fajr Film Festival after criticizing Mohammad Heidari, the festival's secretary, for referring to the film "Lovely Trash" as a "problem" and citing a lack of "new perspectives and fresh ideas" in the festival.
- This film was finally released in February 2019, with box office sales exceeding one billion tomans in its first week.
- No trailer aired on IRIB: Due to the film's setting around the events of the 2009 election and its focus on censorship, IRIB refrained from airing a trailer for this film from the start.
- Ban in the cinemas of the Islamic Development Organization: The cinemas of this organization, notably Tehran's Azadi Cinema, which has a history of banning several films like "Private," "Guidance Patrol," "I Am Mother" and "Cold Sweat," also banned the screening of this film. It took six years for this film to receive a screening permit.
