= Lyiza =

2011 Rwandan short film

- Directed by: Marie Clémentine Dusabejambo
- Screenplay by: Marie-Clementine Dusabejambo
- Starring: Barbara Umutesi, Rodrigue Cyuzuzo
- Edited by: Richard Mugwaneza
- Music by: Babrah Dusange, Betty Murungi, Bryan Senti, Jay Wadley
- Release date: 2011
- Running time: 21 minutes
- Country: Rwanda

Lyiza is a 2011 Rwandan short film directed by Marie Clémentine Dusabejambo.

== Synopsis ==
The past is always present in the life of Lyiza who has to live with the traumatic memory of her parents’ murder, during the genocide against the Tutsi in 1994 in Rwanda. When she recognizes in the father of her classmate, Rwena, the person responsible for their murder, she says so publicly, creating great tension. But harmony returns through the intervention of a teacher who takes the youngsters to the museum of the genocide, the place of memory, and guides Lyiza towards forgiveness. Without being didactic and with an original narrative style, the film underlines the importance of sharing experiences and educating for truth and reconciliation.
