= A Hungarian Fairy Tale =

- Hungarian poster
- Directed by: Gyula Gazdag
- Written by: Gyula Gazdag; Miklós Györffy
- Starring: Dávid Vermes; František Husák; Mária Varga; Eszter Csákányi
- Cinematography: Elemér Ragályi
- Edited by: Júlia Sívó
- Music by: István Márta
- Release date: 15 August 1987 (Hungary)
- Running time: 97 minutes
- Country: Hungary
- Language: Hungarian

A Hungarian Fairy Tale (original title: Hol volt, hol nem volt) is a 1987 Hungarian film directed by Gyula Gazdag.

== Plot ==
Andris is a child living in Budapest. He is conceived when his mother Maria is attracted to a mysterious stranger during a performance of The Magic Flute. The stranger disappears after the conception, and as a result Andris does not know his father. The law states that a boy should have his father's name, even if the father is unknown, to avoid the taint of illegitimacy. When Maria tries to register Andris with the child custody department, Andris is given the name of a fictitious father. She enters on Andris' birth certificate the name of the bureaucrat she is dealing with, Antal Orban.

Maria dies when she is hit on the head by a falling brick, an accident resulting from being in the wrong place at the wrong time, leaving Andris suddenly motherless. He then goes off in search of his nonexistent father. Along the way he meets and is helped by The Girl, the young nurse who delivered him, and who is alone like Andris. Meanwhile, the kindly Orban becomes tired of the tyrannical bureaucracy, and decides to destroy the files of children he has helped to legitimize by giving them fictitious fathers. He then sets out to find Andris. Andris and The Girl finally meet Orban, and they form their own family.

They meet scouts being trained as instruments of the state, and the scouts pursue Andris, Orban and The Girl. The three of them climb onto the back of a stone eagle, which takes off in flight.

== Cast ==
- Dávid Vermes - Andris
- František Husák - Antal Orban
- Mária Varga - Maria
- Eszter Csákányi - The Girl

== Reception ==
American television critic John Leonard wrote that the film is a "parable of lost identity, and an antisocial escape fantasy, and a sly subversion of the nonprofit police state, the machinery of official fictions ... but the payoff is irrational, and all the lovelier for it ... what happens to Andris and his outlaw friends in the film is, more or less, what happened to the cherubim in The Magic Flute, to Pascal Lamorisse in The Red Balloon ... your heart will fly up too."

American film critic James Monaco said that "although state paternalism is director Gazdag's enemy here, the movie is lighter in tone and more direct in its emotional appeal that most of his previous work ... a deft combination of old Hollywood texture and luminosity and 60s new wave freedom, and surreal fantasy atmospherics, the film may have already lost its topical bite, but the structure underlying it, the simple myth at the complex heart of things, is made to last."

David Bleiler wrote in his book The Discerning Film Lover's Guide. that the film is "told with subtle humor and imbued with poetic beauty, this story of outsiders fleeing the confines of a conformist society is a remarkable achievement ... filmed in black and white, this dreamlike and imaginative story will stay with the viewer long after it is over." American film critic Peter Travers opined that the film was a "potent piece of bureaucracy-bashing".

In his review for the Chicago Reader, Kurt Jacobsenan noted the film is an "uneasy and highly effective mixture of realistic narrative and surrealistic odyssey ... here bureaucracy bites the dust and an orphaned boy ultimately takes wing to a never-never land of family bliss ...shot superbly in luminous black and white, the film is a captivating accomplishment even if the subtle allegorical (antiauthoritarian) dimension is ignored. Gazdag’s droll and stinging style is muted, the better to highlight an ambitious and nearly archetypal rendering of the quest for a sense of identity and for an unmanipulated milieu to live in."

== Accolades ==
The film won the following awards:

- Fantafestival 1988 - Best Actress (Mária Varga)
- Locarno International Film Festival 1987 - Bronze Leopard (Dávid Vermes) (Special Grand Prize)
- Salerno Film Festival 1989 - Grand Prix (Gyula Gazdag)
- Sitges Film Festival 1987 - Best Film (Gyula Gazdag)
