= The African Who Wanted to Fly =

- L'Africain Qui Voulait Voler
- Directed by: Samantha Biffot
- Based on: Biography of Luc Bendza
- Release date: 2016
- Running time: 71 minutes
- Country: Gabon
- Language: French

The African Who Wanted to Fly (French: L'Africain Qui Voulait Voler) is a 2016 Gabonese film directed by Samantha Biffot. It is partly based on the biography of Luc Bendza. The film was made in two languages, Chinese and French, and had English subtitles.

== Production ==
The African Who Wanted to Fly was produced by Neon Rouge, with co-production from The Actors Company Theatre (France). Scenese were shot in both Gabon, and China. The music was composed of Chinese tunes.

== Plot ==
Watching the movie Big Boss, a Gabonese child discovers Kung Fu and decides to go to China being only 15 years old. He discovers he would be the first African to learn the art of Kung Fu. He eventually masters it.

== Screenings ==
- The movie was viewed at the African Film Festival at Duke University on February 27, 2019.
- Maysles Documentary Center presented the film for the 24th New York African Film Festival on May 19, 2017.
