= Khab-e talkh =

- Directed by: Mohsen Amiryoussefi
- Written by: Mohsen Amiryoussefi
- Produced by: Mohsen Amiryoussefi; Rouhollah Baradari
- Starring: Abbas Esfandiari; Yadollah Anvari; Delbar Ghasri; Mohsen Rahimi
- Cinematography: Bayram Fazli
- Release date: June 1, 2005; (France)
- Running time: 87 minutes
- Country: Iran
- Language: Persian

Khab-e talkh is an Iranian film directed by Mohsen Amiryoussefi in 2004. Amiryoussefi's first feature film is named the first Iranian black comedy. It took home the Caméra d'Or at that year’s Cannes as well as generous critical acclaim.

== Story ==
The film tells the tale of Esfandiar's confrontation with the Azrael after 40 years of bathing the dead. With his life flashing before his eyes, Esfandiar is forced to reconsider his behavior towards his co-workers including: an opium addict gravedigger, a naive young man who burns clothing of the dead and a widow who washes dead women's bodies.

== Critical reception ==
Le Monde's Jean-François Rauger wrote: Here is a strange conceptual comedy, a mixture of diverse and contradictory sensations, an experience both abstract and documentary. A surprise, an unexpected object coming from the ever exciting Iranian cinematography. Death is at the heart of Mohsen Amiryoussefi's first feature not only because the narrative lies in a cemetery, but because it is the unique preoccupation of the main character. And the film bears a special attitude towards the latter, in which reflection and laughter intersect in a cocktail eventually unprecedented. Bitter sleep is above all a farce. This is the challenge that the filmmaker has visibly explored as an explorer of what, at the heart of the least laughable reality, flits the burlesque dimension.

== Awards ==
Khab-e talkh received notable awards from film festivals around the world.

Year	Festival	Award	Result
2004	Cannes Film Festival	Camera d'Or Special Mention	Won
2004	Chicago Film Festival	Gold Hugo	Nominated
2004	Thessaloniki Film Festival	Audience Award	Won
2004	Thessaloniki Film Festival	Golden Alexander	Won
2005	Mar del Plata Film Festival	Special Jury Award	Won
2005	Mar del Plata Film Festival	Best Film	Nominated
