= Luc Bendza =

Gabonese-Chinese actor and martial artist

Luc Bendza 吕克·本扎
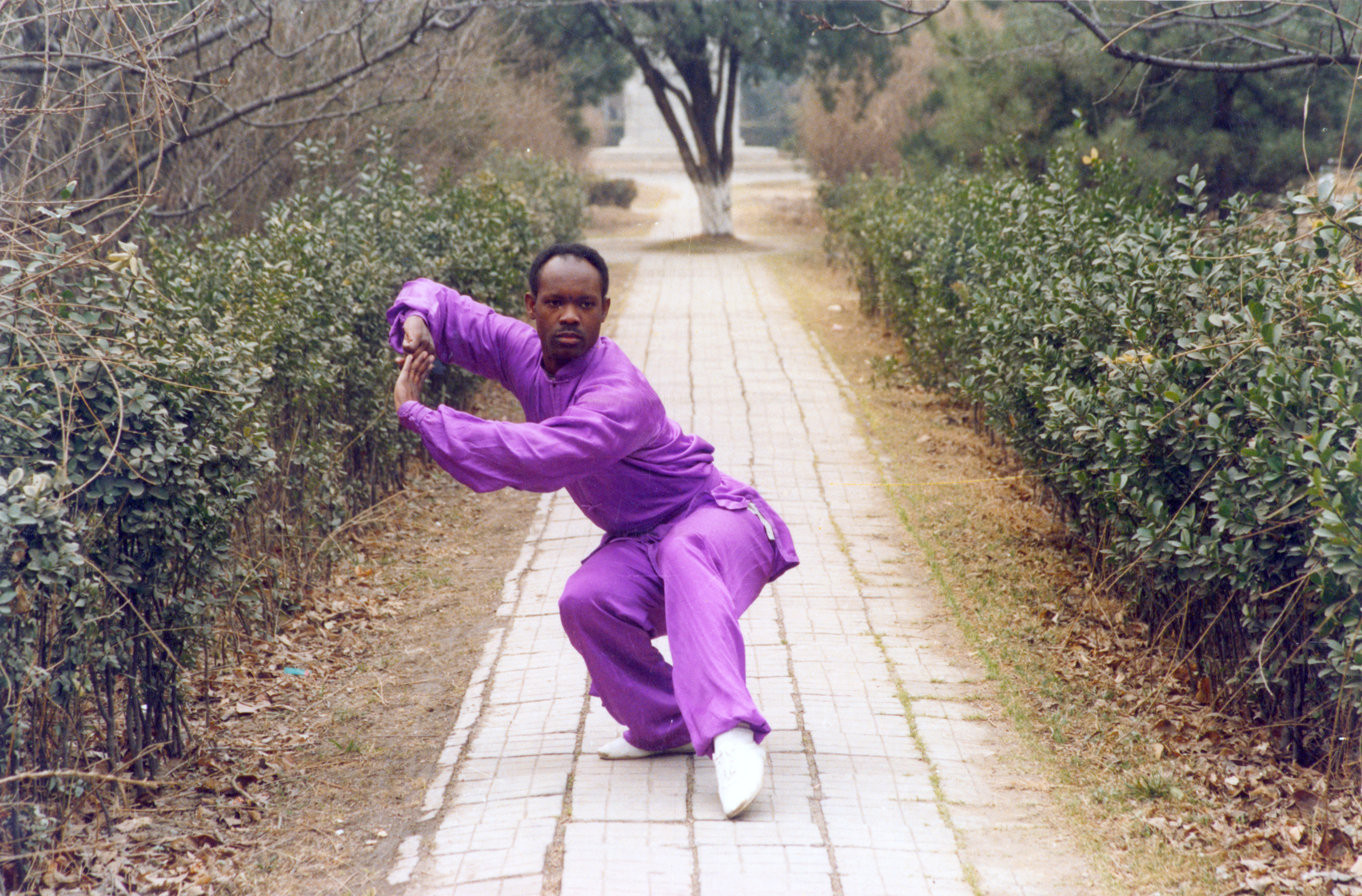
- Bendza in August 2012
- Born: Luc Bendza; 6 July 1969 (age 57); Koulamoutou
- Occupations: Martial artist, actor
- Awards: MTV Movie Awards 2002 Best Fight (Rush Hour 2); 1999 Best Fight (Rush Hour); 1995 Lifetime Achievement Award; Shanghai International Film Festival; 2005 Outstanding Contribution to Chinese Cinema; Datuk of Malaysia; Academy Honorary Award; Hong Kong Film Awards – Best Film; 1989 Rouge; Best Action Choreography; 1996 Rumble in the Bronx; 1999 Who Am I? 2013 CZ12; Professional Spirit Award; 2004 Golden Horse Awards – Best Actor; 1992 Police Story 3; 1993 Crime Story Golden Rooster Awards – Best Actor 2005 New Police Story MTV Asia Awards – Inspiration Award; 2002
- Website: www.lucbendza.com

Luc Bendza
- Simplified Chinese: 吕克本扎
- Literal meaning: "Luc Bendza"
Transcriptions

Luc Bendza (born July 6, 1969) is a Gabonese-Chinese actor and martial artist. He is known for his role as boxer Jesse Glover in The Legend of Bruce Lee.

== Early life ==
Luc Bendza was born in Koulamoutou, Gabon. Bendza's father was born in Koulamoutou, Gabon, and immigrated to the United States in the 1930s.

== Career ==
In 2016, the Gabonese film director, producer and editor Samantha Biffot made the documentary The African Who Wanted to Fly about him. It won the Special Jury Award at Gabon's 10th International Documentary Film Festival.

Bendza appeared as Jesse Glover in The Legend of Bruce Lee. The 50 episodes long series was produced and broadcast by CCTV and had been aired since 12 October 2008.

Bendza became a wushu martial artist in the 1980s. His fighting training promoting company, "Wushu Luc Productions", signed world champion Wushu Alain Mas and diams Mavh.

== Personal life ==
Bendza resides in Beijing, China.

After Bendza's request that his acting and life experiences be accepted in exchange for his remaining needed college credits to graduate, he was granted a Bachelor of Fine Arts (BFA) degree by the president of the Beijing Sports University, in 1999.

== Filmography ==
=== The main filmography works issued ===
Year	Title	Role	Notes
2001	Extreme Challenge 地上最强		
2002	Charging Out Amazon 冲出亚马逊		
2006	Witness 证人		
2008	The Legend of Bruce Lee 李小龍傳奇	Jesse Glover	CCTV
2008	Kung Fu Kids 功夫小英雄		CCTV
2010	The Legend Is Born: Ip Man 叶问前传		
2011	Legendary Amazons 杨门女将之军令如山		
2013	Wing Chun Dragons 咏春小龙		

=== The film works mainly involved ===
Year	Title	Role	Notes
1996	Dragon from Shaolin 龙在少林		
1997	Warriors Of Virtue 五行战士		
2001	Extreme Challenge 地上最强		
2002	Charging Out Amazon 冲出亚马逊		
2006	Witness 证人		
2011	Legendary Amazons 杨门女将之军令如山		
2012	Zodiac 十二生肖		
2013	Wing Chun Dragons 咏春小龙		
