= Mohsen Amiryoussefi =

Iranian filmmaker

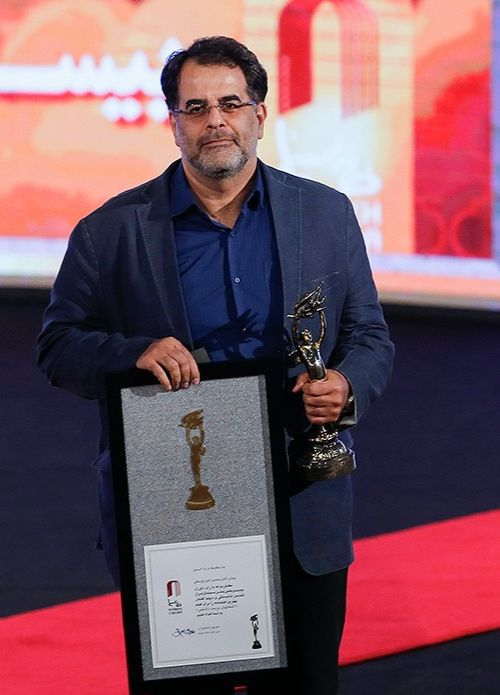
- Amiryoussefi in 2019
- Born: February 24, 1972 (age 54); Abadan, Iran
- Occupations: Director, Screenwriter

Mohsen Amiryoussefi (Persian: محسن امیریوسفی; born 5 Esfand 1350 / 24 February 1972 in Abadan, Iran) is an Iranian film director, screenwriter, producer and film-industry trade union activist. His films are often characterised by unconventional narratives, black humour and social themes. His first feature film, Bitter Dream, was screened in the Directors' Fortnight section of the 2004 Cannes Film Festival and received a Special Distinction in the Caméra d'Or category.

Several of Amiryoussefi's films were unable to receive a public release in Iran for extended periods. Bitter Dream was released in Iran after approximately twelve years; Fire-Maker was released four years after it was made; and Lovely Trash was released in 2019 after six years of restrictions on its release.

Alongside filmmaking, Amiryoussefi has been active in Iranian cinema's professional associations. He became president of the Iranian Directors' Association in 2017 and held the position for three terms, totalling eight years. He stepped down in 2024 and was elected vice-chair of the 17th board of directors of the Iranian House of Cinema.

His most recent film, The Banning Curse, was included in the programme of the 70th BFI London Film Festival in 2026. The British Film Institute described the 88-minute work as a "cinematic autofiction".

== Early life and beginnings ==
Amiryoussefi was born in Abadan and graduated in mathematics from the University of Isfahan. He began his filmmaking career in 1997 with the short film Nader, Son of the Sword, based on a story by Franz Kafka. His works before his first feature film included Father and Son, Stone Hands and the documentary Caravan. These works received several awards at Iranian and international festivals.

== Film career ==
=== Bitter Dream ===
In 2003, Amiryoussefi made his first feature film, Bitter Dream (Khab-e Talkh), on a limited budget and with non-professional actors in Homayunshahr (now Khomeynishahr). The film tells the story of Esfandiar, an elderly gravedigger who, as he approaches death, confronts his fears and everyday life. It treats the subject of death through black comedy, a grotesque atmosphere and a combination of reality and fantasy.

Bitter Dream screened in the Directors' Fortnight section of the 2004 Cannes Film Festival and received a Special Distinction in the Caméra d'Or category that year. The film also received the Young Look award at Directors' Fortnight. International critics noted its grotesque atmosphere and black humour, and described it as an early example of Iranian international black comedy. Reviews highlighted its darkly comic treatment of death.

The film subsequently appeared at numerous international festivals. At the 2004 Thessaloniki International Film Festival, Bitter Dream received the Golden Alexander and the Audience Award. The film was also included among the recipients of the 2004 FIPRESCI Awards.

Despite its international festival appearances, the film was not publicly released in Iran for several years. Bitter Dream eventually opened in December 2015 through the Art and Experience cinema programme. It became the highest-grossing film of that year in the Art and Experience programme.

=== Fire-Maker ===
In 2006, Amiryoussefi made Fire-Maker (Atashkar) in Isfahan province, starring Hamid Farrokhnezhad alongside a group of non-professional actors. The film is about a worker at an iron and steel plant who has four daughters and decides to undergo a vasectomy. His father's ghost opposes the decision and asks him to have a son. Using comedy and fantasy, the film addresses tradition, having children and individual autonomy.

Fire-Maker was also prevented from being released for four years. In an interview with Euronews, Amiryoussefi said that after several years of restrictions, the film was released in 2010. Its release was subject to numerous restrictions: it was not allowed to advertise before its opening and premiered on the first day of the 2010 Fajr Film Festival, when public attention was focused on the festival and its films. In 2009, the film received the "Innovation in Cinema" award at the Montreal World Film Festival. A report from the festival stated that Amiryoussefi dedicated the award to "the people of Iran and young independent filmmakers".

=== Documentaries ===
In 2011, Amiryoussefi made the feature-length documentary My Home. The film is based on his personal experience of searching for and buying a home, combining humour with observations of everyday life.

During the same period, he participated in the four-part documentary Kahrizak, Four Views. The film consists of four segments directed by Rakhshan Bani-Etemad, Mohsen Amiryoussefi, Pirouz Kolantari and Bahman Kiarostami. Amiryoussefi's segment, titled Hamlet in Kahrizak, follows a group of residents of the Kahrizak care centre as they attempt to stage Shakespeare's Hamlet. The segment was nominated for Best Direction in the documentary section of the Fajr Film Festival.

=== Lovely Trash ===
In 2012, six years after making Fire-Maker, Amiryoussefi made his third feature film, Lovely Trash (Ashghal-e Doost-Dashtani). The process of obtaining a production permit took approximately a year and a half. According to Amiryoussefi, the screenplay was rewritten several times; Euronews reported that it had been rewritten 16 times. Amiryoussefi has said that pressure from the production-permit review council to make repeated rewrites led to a stroke in May 2012, after which he was admitted to the intensive care unit of Tous Hospital in Iran.

The film's principal cast included Shirin Yazdanbakhsh, Akbar Abdi, Habib Rezaei, Hedieh Tehrani, Negar Javaherian, Saber Abar and Shahab Hosseini.

The story centres on an elderly woman named Monir, who becomes concerned about the possibility of her home being searched in the aftermath of the 2009 Iranian presidential election. She tries to remove objects and signs from the house that might cause trouble for members of her family. Much of the narrative unfolds through Monir's conversations with images of family members in framed photographs. The film explores political and generational differences within a family.

In the film's production, actors portraying deceased family members did not perform together in the same frame; their images were brought together during editing and visual-effects work. The film encountered problems when it was submitted for screening at the 2013 Fajr Film Festival and was unable to secure a public release in subsequent years.

Efforts to secure a release continued for approximately six years. Lovely Trash was finally released in cinemas on 13 February 2019. Amiryoussefi said that, after years of disagreement over requested changes, the released version largely retained the structure he had intended. In 2019, he received the Best Screenplay award at the 21st Iran Cinema Celebration for the film.

=== The Original Lovely Trash ===
After the release of Lovely Trash, Amiryoussefi announced another version, titled The Original Lovely Trash (Ashghal-e Doost-Dashtani Asl), which also featured Behrouz Vossoughi. In the same year, Amiryoussefi was accused of intending to revive the Pahlavi dynasty by including Vossoughi in the film. This version adds another character to the group of family members and incorporates aspects of several decades of Iran's political and cultural history into the narrative.

Amiryoussefi also pursued a screening of this version at the Fajr Film Festival, but the film did not receive a public release. Vossoughi's participation, after several decades away from Iranian cinema, was one of the main differences between this version and the version released in cinemas. The film has remained unreleased since 2019 and, according to the Persian-language article, has not had a domestic or international screening.

=== Qeyf ===
After a ten-year break from making feature films, Amiryoussefi made Qeyf, starring Reza Attaran. The work was initially written as a 15-episode comedy and fantasy series, but the Ministry of Culture and Islamic Guidance did not grant permission for its production in 2021. The Cinema Organization approved the making of the film in 2022.

During filming, Amiryoussefi was summoned and questioned several times by the Evin Prosecutor's Office. The Persian-language article attributes the summonses to his signing of the statement "Put Down Your Gun". It further reports that he was tried in the Revolutionary Court during filming and received a four-year suspended prison sentence and a financial penalty. Qeyf was released in 2024.

=== The Banning Curse ===
The Banning Curse (Persian: نفرین توقیف) is a 2026 film written, produced and directed by Amiryoussefi. The film was made in 2026. The BFI lists its running time as 88 minutes and its country of production as Iran.

According to the official London Film Festival programme, the film combines autobiography and fiction to revisit Amiryoussefi's experiences as a filmmaker and the restrictions placed on his films. The BFI describes it as a "cinematic autofiction". The film was selected for the 70th BFI London Film Festival and was listed in the programme as a world premiere.

According to the Iranian newspaper Shargh, The Banning Curse is an unlicensed dark comedy. The report says that, after experiencing 29 years of restrictions during 23 years of filmmaking, Amiryoussefi decided to make this film without a permit. Shargh described the film as continuing the grotesque atmosphere and black comedy associated with his work. The report also said that the film combines the encounters of a strange creature with events following the 1979 Iranian Revolution with a dramatic treatment of the events of January 2026. These descriptions and claims should be attributed to the newspaper's report.

== Literary work ==
Amiryoussefi wrote a short-story collection titled The Monster (Heyula). According to a report by IranWire, the collection was granted a publication permit and printed by Cheshmeh Publishing in 2024. However, after printing and when distribution was being arranged, the Ministry of Culture and Islamic Guidance ordered distribution to be halted, saying that the book required further review. The collection contains eight short stories.

== Trade union activities and social and political positions ==
Alongside filmmaking, Amiryoussefi has been active in social and professional organisations in the Iranian film industry and the Iranian House of Cinema. In 2010, he was elected to the central council of the Association of Producer-Directors of Iranian Cinema and became the association's secretary. He remained on its central council until 2017.

In 2017, he was elected to the board of the Iranian Directors' Association. He subsequently became the association's president following a vote by its central council. During this period, the association pursued members' employment and livelihood concerns and emphasised the protection of professional rights and the independence of trade union activities. It also issued statements responding to issues in the film industry and to some social events.

In June 2018, at a ceremony held at the Iranian House of Cinema following the death of Naser Malek-Motiei, Amiryoussefi spoke and played an audio message from Behrouz Vossoughi to his late friend and colleague. Euronews reported that Vossoughi referred in the message to his 40 years away from Iran. The event prompted reactions from some conservative media outlets and comments about Vossoughi's presence and professional activity. A letter signed by a number of filmmakers was subsequently published, calling for Vossoughi to be allowed to return and work in Iranian cinema.

Following the November 2019 protests in Iran, a statement titled "The Voice of Aban 98" was issued by a group of artists and cultural figures. Amiryoussefi was among its signatories.

In July 2021, during the worsening water crisis in Khuzestan, a group of artists and filmmakers, including Massoud Kimiai, Kianoush Ayari and Navid Mohammadzadeh, gathered in the courtyard of the Iranian Artists Forum. Amiryoussefi also spoke at the gathering. Referring to Khuzestan's economic importance, he said: "For 113 years, Khuzestan has been the paymaster of Iran through its oil."

In May 2022, the Metropol building in Abadan collapsed. A group of filmmakers subsequently published a statement titled "Put Down Your Gun", calling on military and security forces to lay down their weapons in response to protesters. The publication of the statement was followed by summonses and the opening of legal cases against several filmmakers.

Amiryoussefi was summoned and questioned in connection with signing the statement and his trade union activities on behalf of colleagues. Radio Farda reported in 2023 that he had received a two-year suspended prison sentence and a fine of 150 million Iranian rials in connection with the case.

In April 2023, following the death of filmmaker Kiomars Pourahmad, the Iranian Directors' Association issued a statement that was read at a memorial ceremony at Behesht-e Zahra cemetery. Reports subsequently appeared concerning Amiryoussefi being summoned. On 27 May 2023, it was reported that he had been summoned to the Evin Security Prosecutor's Office by judicial order in his capacity as president of the Directors' Association and had answered questions from judicial officials.

In October 2023, filmmaker Dariush Mehrjui and his wife, Vahideh Mohammadifar, were murdered at their home. At their funeral, Amiryoussefi read a statement from the Iranian Directors' Association. The statement referred to the condition of Iranian cinema and remembered Kiomars Pourahmad. It called on officials to identify and introduce those responsible for the killings and to respond to public concerns.

In 2024, Amiryoussefi ran in the Iranian House of Cinema board election as a representative of the Directors' Association. After being elected to the board, he became vice-chair of its 17th term.

Regarding events in January 2026, reports appeared about the position of the Iranian House of Cinema board and possible judicial follow-up. In June 2026, Human Rights Activists News Agency (HRANA), quoting Emtedad, reported that Amiryoussefi, Tahmineh Milani, Mostafa Kiaei and Mohsen Kiaei had been summoned to the Culture and Media Prosecutor's Office on an accusation described as "cooperation with hostile states against the Islamic Republic". After the report was published, a media outlet affiliated with the judiciary denied that the summonses had taken place. Later reports described both accounts.

On 29 September 2026, Amiryoussefi was summoned to the security office of the Tehran Ershad Prosecutor's Office following a call from the Ministry of Intelligence. According to Iran Emrooz, quoting Emtedad, the summons concerned The Banning Curse. At the time the report was published, no details had been released about the outcome of his visit, the opening of a case or any possible charge.

Amiryoussefi has also used the character Agha Esfandiar, the protagonist of Bitter Dream, in satirical writings about social, cinematic and political issues. Examples of writings in the character's voice have been published in the media.

== Filmography ==
Year (Persian calendar)	Film	Producer	Director	Writer
1382 (2003–04)	Bitter Dream (Khab-e Talkh)	Yes	Yes	Yes
1385 (2006–07)	Fire-Maker (Atashkar)	Yes	Yes	Yes
1390 (2011–12)	My Home	Yes	Yes	—
1390 (2011–12)	Kahrizak, Four Views (Hamlet in Kahrizak segment)	Yes	Yes	Yes
1391 (2012–13)	Lovely Trash (Ashghal-e Doost-Dashtani)	Yes	Yes	Yes
1398 (2019–20)	The Original Lovely Trash	Yes	Yes	Yes
1401 (2022–23)	Qeyf	No	Yes	Yes
1405 (2026–27)	The Banning Curse	Yes	Yes	Yes

== Awards and festival appearances ==
=== Short films ===
==== Nader, Son of the Sword (1997) ====
- Short film adapted from the story "The Sword" by Franz Kafka.
- Screened at the Fajr Film Festival in 1997.

==== Father and Son (1998) ====
- Short fiction film.
- First Prize, Ebensee Festival, Austria, 2000.

==== Stone Hands (2000) ====
- Short documentary-fiction film.
- Grand Prize, Aubagne Festival, France, 2000.
- Special Jury Award, Aix-en-Provence Festival, 2001.
- Best Short Film, Yazd Truth Film Festival, 2000.
- Screened at Clermont-Ferrand International Short Film Festival, France.
- Screened at Tampere Film Festival, Finland.
- Screened at St Petersburg Festival, Russia.
- Screened at Ghent Festival, Belgium.
- Screened at São Paulo Festival, Brazil.
- Screened at Göteborg Film Festival, Sweden.

==== Caravan (2001) ====
- Short documentary.
- Best Film, Tehran International Short Film Festival, 2002.
- Best Film, Yadegar Festival, 2003.
- Best Editing, Yadegar Festival, 2003.
- Best Documentary Writing, Yadegar Festival, 2003.

=== Bitter Dream ===
Amiryoussefi was the writer, director, producer and editor of the feature film Bitter Dream, made in 2003.

Awards and honours:

- Caméra d'Or – Special Distinction, Cannes Film Festival, 2004.
- Young Look award, Cannes Directors' Fortnight, 2004.
- Golden Alexander, Thessaloniki International Film Festival, Greece, 2004.
- Audience Award, Thessaloniki International Film Festival, Greece, 2004.
- Special Jury Award, Mar del Plata International Film Festival, Argentina, 2005.
- FIPRESCI Award, Geneva Film Festival, Switzerland, 2004.
- Young Jury Award, Tous Écrans Festival, Switzerland, 2004.
- World Distribution Award, Tous Écrans Festival, Switzerland, 2004.
- SIGNIS World Catholic Association for Communication award, Open-Dox Festival, Belgium, 2005.
- Critics' Award, Valdivia International Film Festival, Chile, 2005.
- Crystal Simorgh for Best Trailer, Fajr Film Festival, 2015.

Bitter Dream screened at more than 40 international festivals. Festival appearances listed in the Persian-language article include:

- Montreal Film Festival, Canada, 2004.
- Chicago International Film Festival, United States, 2004.
- Los Angeles, United States, 2005.
- London Media Arts Festival, United Kingdom, 2005.
- Nantes Festival, France, 2004.
- Edinburgh International Film Festival, Scotland, 2004.
- Hamburg Film Festival, Germany, 2004.
- Valladolid International Film Festival, Spain, 2004.
- Flanders Festival, Belgium, 2004.
- Mons International Film Festival, Belgium, 2005.
- Adelaide Film Festival, Australia, 2005.
- Melbourne International Film Festival, Australia, 2005.
- Göteborg Film Festival, Sweden, 2005.
- Istanbul International Film Festival, Turkey, 2005.
- Dubai Film Festival, 2004.
- Fajr Film Festival, Iran, 2005.
- Quebec City Film Festival, Canada.
- Edmonton International Film Festival, Canada.
- Cleveland International Film Festival, United States.
- Alexandria International Film Festival, Egypt.
- Zagreb Film Festival, Croatia.
- Minneapolis–Saint Paul International Film Festival, United States.
- Jeonju International Film Festival, South Korea.
- ArtEast, New York, United States.
- Anchorage International Film Festival, Alaska, United States.

Bitter Dream was also released in cinemas in France in 2005.

=== Fire-Maker ===
Amiryoussefi was the writer, director and producer of the feature film Fire-Maker, made in 2006.

- "Innovation in Cinema" award, Montreal World Film Festival, Canada, 2009.
- Crystal Simorgh for Best Trailer, Fajr Film Festival, 2010.

=== My Home ===
Amiryoussefi was the writer, director and executive producer of the feature-length documentary My Home.

- Best Documentary of the Year, selected by documentary critics and experts, 2011.

=== Kahrizak, Four Views ===
Amiryoussefi co-produced the feature documentary Kahrizak, Four Views with Pirouz Kolantari and directed the segment Hamlet in Kahrizak. The other directors were Rakhshan Bani-Etemad, Pirouz Kolantari and Bahman Kiarostami.

- Nominated for Best Director for Hamlet in Kahrizak, Fajr Film Festival, 2011.
- Crystal Simorgh for Best Editing for Hamlet in Kahrizak, Fajr Film Festival, 2011.
- Special Jury Award, Dubai International Film Festival, 2012.

=== Lovely Trash ===
Amiryoussefi was the writer, director and producer of the feature film Lovely Trash, made in 2012.

- Best Screenplay, Iran Cinema Celebration, 2019.

=== The Original Lovely Trash ===
Another version of the film, titled The Original Lovely Trash, was made and featured Behrouz Vossoughi. The existence of this version was announced in 2019.

=== The Banning Curse ===
The Banning Curse is a film written, directed and produced by Mohsen Amiryoussefi. It was made in 2026.

- Selected for its world premiere at the 70th BFI London Film Festival, 2026.

== Awards ==
He has received international awards for his critically acclaimed movies Khab- talkh and Atashkar.

Year	Festival	Award	Nominated work	Result
2004	Cannes Film Festival	Camera d'Or	Khab-e talkh	Won
2004	Chicago Film Festival	Gold Hugo	Khab-e talkh	Nominated
2004	Thessaloniki Film Festival	Audience Award	Khab-e talkh	Won
2004	Thessaloniki Film Festival	Golden Alexander	Khab-e talkh	Won
2005	Mar del Plata Film Festival	Special Jury Award	Khab-e talkh	Won
2005	Mar del Plata Film Festival	Best Film	Khab-e talkh	Nominated
2009	Montréal World Film Festival	Innovation Award	Atashkar	Won
2009	Montréal World Film Festival	Grand Prix des Amériques	Atashkar	Nominated

== Filmography ==
- Khab-e talkh or Bitter Dream (2004)
- Atashkar or Fire Keeper (2009)
- Ashghal haye Doost Dashtani or Lovely Trash (2012)

== See also ==
- Iranian New Wave
- Cinema of Iran
