= Samantha Biffot =

French-Gabonese filmmaker

- Born: 1985 (age 40–41); Paris
- Occupations: Screenwriter, film producer, film director
- Notable work: The African Who Wanted to Fly (2016)

Samantha Biffot (born 1985) is a Gabonese-French screenwriter, film producer and film director.

== Biography ==
Biffot was born in Paris in 1985. She spent her childhood between Gabon, South Korea and France, and her multicultural upbringing influenced her later filmmaking. After receiving her baccalaureate, she studied at the École Supérieure de Réalisation Audiovisuelle in Paris where she obtained a degree in cinema in 2007. Upon graduation, Biffot completed several television and film internships in France. Biffot returned to Gabon in 2010 where she established the production company "Princesse M Production" with Pierre-Adrien Ceccaldi. In 2011, she organized workshops in screenplay, production, image and editing as part of the International Festival of School Courts in Libreville.

In 2013, her TV series L'Œil de la cité (The Eye of the city) received the prize for the best African series at the Panafrican Film and Television Festival of Ouagadougou. The series examined ritual crimes and environmental and social problems, with each episode having a moral at the end. She said she was influenced by the American series Tales from the Crypt, and her series was produced by the Institut Gabonais de l'Image et du Son. In 2016, Biffot released the documentary The African Who Wanted to Fly, depicting the life of Gabonese kung fu master Luc Bendza. The film received the Special Jury Prize at the Festival Escales Socumentaires de Libreville as well as being named Best Documentary Film at the 2017 Burundi International Film and Audiovisual Festival. The African Who Wanted to Fly was also screened at the Internationales Dokumentarfilmfestival München and the African Film Festival in New York.

Also in 2016, Biffot co-wrote and produced the African version of the TV series Parents mode d’emploi. In 2017, she directed the popular series Taxi Sagat, in which comedian Sagat plays a taxi driver and puts the riders in humorous situations, such as calling his girlfriend. Biffot collaborated with Oliver Messa on the 2019 TV series Sakho & Mangane, about two policemen who solve cases involving the paranormal. It was filmed in Dakar and took three years to create. In November 2019, she led a workshop for Samba children on behalf of the NGO Samba Labs, as she considered the youth in Gabon were not given enough platforms to express themselves.

== Filmography ==
- 2013: L'Œil de la cité (TV series)
- 2016: The African Who Wanted to Fly (documentary)
- 2016-2020: Parents mode d’emploi Afrique (TV series)
- 2017: Taxi Sagat (TV series)
- 2018: Kongossa telecom (TV series)
- 2019: Sakho & Mangane (TV series)
