= Gyula Gazdag =

Hungarian film director, screenwriter and actor (born 1947)

Gyula Gazdag (born 19 July 1947 in Budapest) is a Hungarian film director, screenwriter and actor. He has been involved with the Sundance Institute as a creative advisor for its Directors and Screenwriters Labs since 1994 and as artistic director for the Directors Lab since 1997. He was awarded their inaugural Robert Redford Luminary Award in 2026 alongside Ed Harris.

== Filmography ==
Director

- The Long Distance Runner [Hosszú futásodra mindig számíthatunk...] (1969, documentary short)
- The Selection [A válogatás] (1970, documentary short)
- The Whistling Cobblestone [A sípoló macskakő] (1971)
- The Resolution [A határozat] (1972, documentary)
- Singing on the Treadmill [Bástyasétány hetvennégy] (1974)
- Swap [A kétfenekű dob] (1978)
- The Banquet [A bankett] (1982, documentary)
- Lost Illusions [Elveszett illúziók] (1983)
- Package Tour [Társasutazás] (1985, documentary)
- A Hungarian Fairy Tale [Hol volt, hol nem volt...] (1987)
- Stand Off [Túsztörténet] (1989)
- Hungarian Chronicles [Chroniques hongroises] (1991, documentary)
- A Poet on the Lower east Side [Egy költö a Lower East Side-ról] (1997, documentary)

Actor

- 25, Firemen's Street Tüzoltó utca 25. (1973)
- Dreaming Youth [Álmodó ifjúság] (1974)
- Confidence Bizalom (1980)
- Colonel Redl [Oberst Redl] 1985
- Working West (1992)
