= Eszter Csákányi =

Hungarian actress

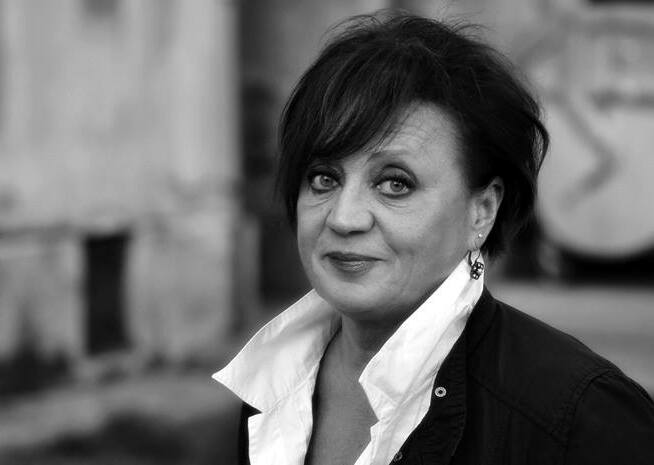
- Born: 10 June 1953 (age 73); Budapest, Hungary
- Occupation: Actress

Eszter Csákányi (born 10 June 1953) is a Hungarian actress. She appeared in 1991's Paths of Death and Angels. She is the daughter of actor László Csákányi.
