= Mikheil Tumanishvili =

Georgian theatre director (1921–1996)

- მიხეილ თუმანიშვილი
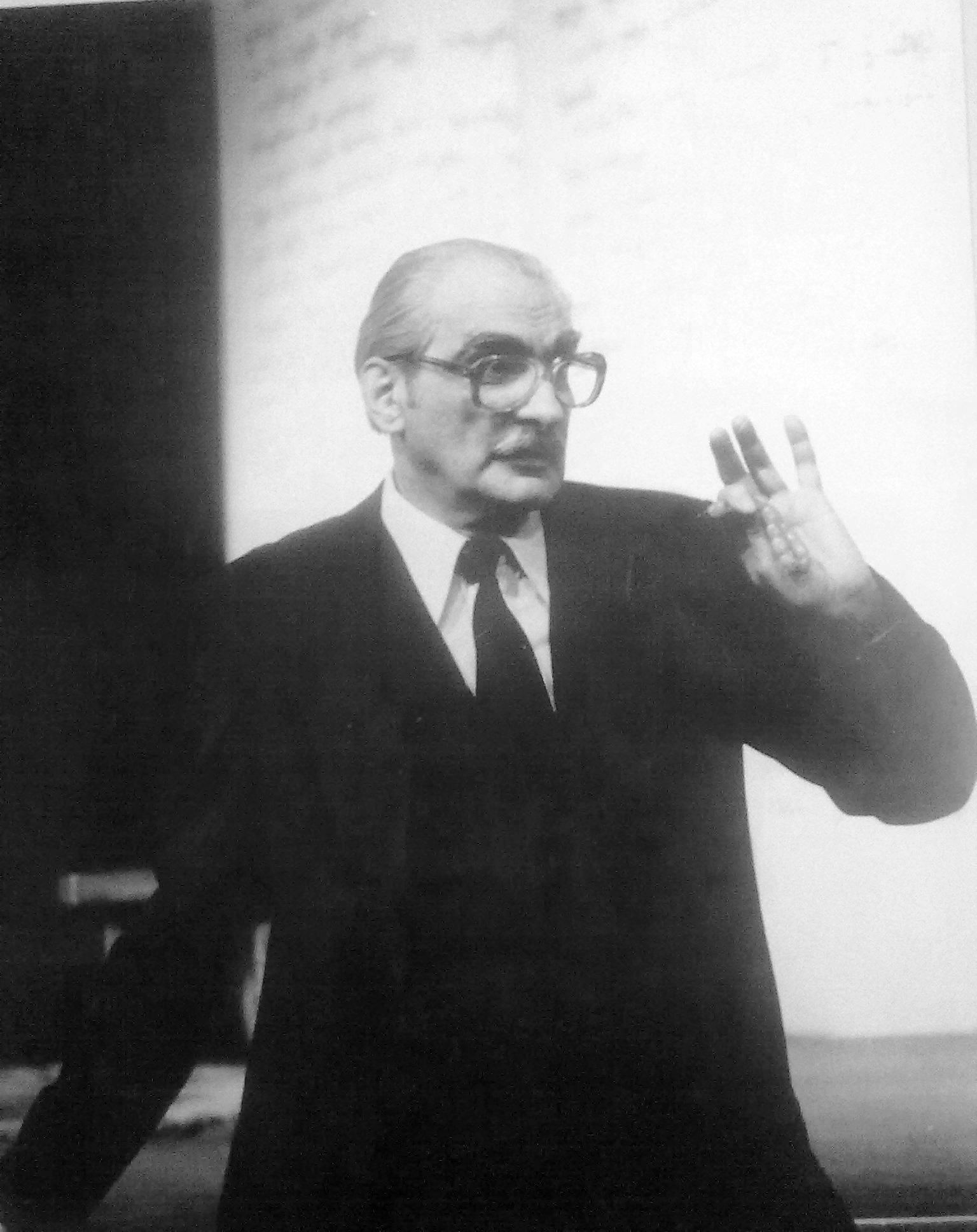
- Born: Mikheil Tumanishvili; 6 February 1921; Tbilisi, Democratic Republic of Georgia
- Died: 11 May 1996 (aged 75); Tbilisi, Georgia
- Occupations: Theater director, pedagog

Mikheil Tumanishvili (Georgian: მიხეილ თუმანიშვილი; 6 february 1921 – 11 May 1996), was a Georgian theater director and teacher. He was a student of Georgy Tovstonogov at the Tbilisi State Theater Institute and graduated in 1948. Tumanishvili is the founder of 1978 established Tumanishvili Film Actors Theatre in Tbilisi. As a director, his work was mostly based on improvisation.
