= Nana Jorjadze =

Georgian film director and scriptwriter

Nana Jorjadze ნანა ჯორჯაძე
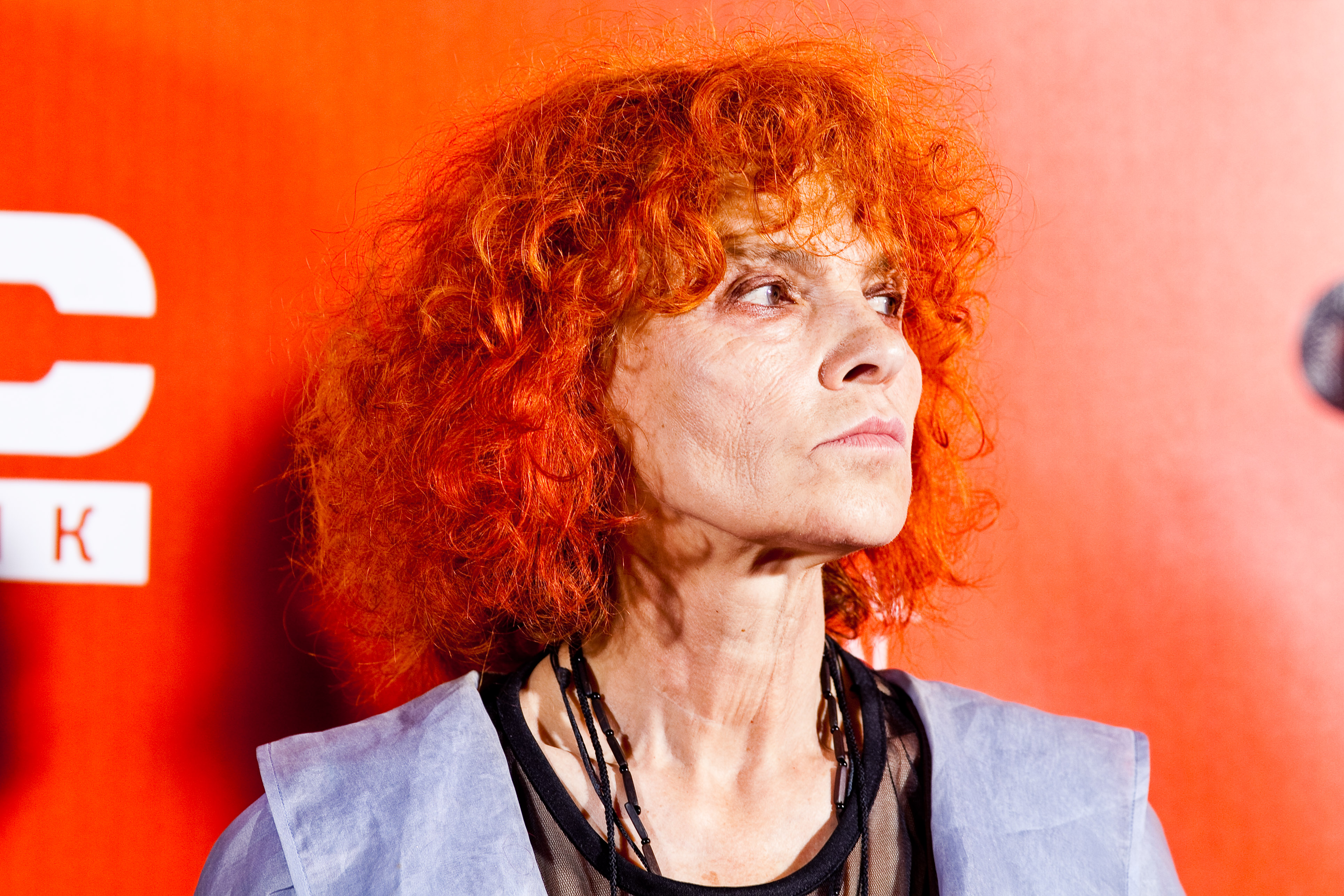
- Jorjadze in 2013
- Born: 24 August 1948 (age 78); Tbilisi, Georgian SSR, Soviet Union (now Georgia)
- Education: Tbilisi State Academy of Arts; Shota Rustaveli Theatre and Film University
- Occupations: Filmmaker; screenwriter; actress
- Years active: 1977–present
- Family: Mikhail Kvirikadze

Nana Jorjadze (Georgian: ნანა ჯორჯაძე; born 24 August 1948) is a Georgian film director, screenwriter and actress. Her work has received several accolades, including an Academy Award nomination.

Jorjadze was born in Tbilisi, and graduated first from a local musical school (1966), and then from the architectural department at the Tbilisi State Academy of Fine Arts in 1972.She worked as an architect in the years 1968 to 1974.

She later enrolled in the Tbilisi State Theatre Institute which she completed in 1980. She debuted as an actress with the film Some Interviews on Personal Matters in 1977; and as a director with A Journey to Sopot in 1979.

Her 1987 work Robinsonada or My English Grandfather was a breakthrough that won her the Caméra d'Or at the 1987 Cannes Film Festival, and both critical and popular acclaim. She moved to France early in the 1990s and directed several films including A Chef in Love (1996) which became the first, and so far the only, Georgian film to be nominated for an Academy Award.

She is married to fellow Georgian writer and director Irakli Kvirikadze, who previously went by the name Irakli Mikhailovich Kvirikadze.

== Filmography ==
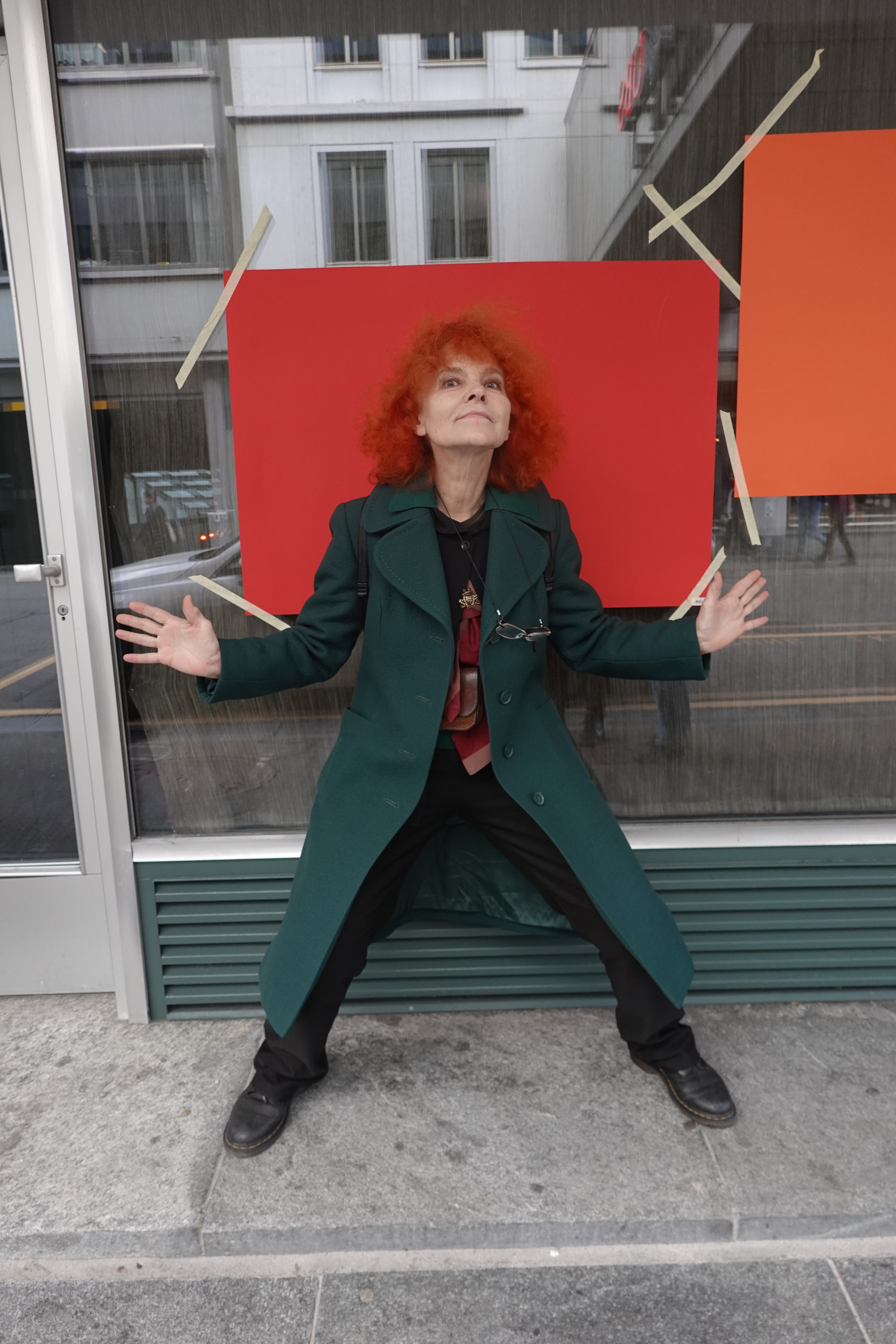
Nana Jorjadze 2021 in Zürich.

As director

- Mogzauroba Sopotshi (1979)
- Atlant (1979)
- Momekhmaret ialbuzze asvlashi (TV Movie) (1981)
- Erosi (1984)
- Robinsonada or My English Grandfather (1987)
- Encounters (1993)
- Château de la napoule (1993)
- About Georgia (1993)
- A Chef in Love (1996) as Nana Djordjadze
- 27 Missing Kisses (2000) as Nana Djordjadze
- Tolko ty... (TV Mini-Series) (2004)
- The Rainbowmaker (2008)
- Moskva, ya lyublyu tebya! (2010)
- My Mermaid, My Lorelei (2013)
- Prime Meridian of Wine Géorgie (2016) (Documentary)

As writer

- Mogzauroba Sopotshi (1979)
- Atlant (1979)
- Momekhmaret ialbuzze asvlashi (TV Movie) (1981)
- Erosi (1984)
- Encounters (1993)
- Château de la napoule (1993)
- About Georgia (1993)
- A Chef in Love (1996) as Nana Djordjadze
- 27 dakarguli kotsna (2000) as Nana Djordjadze

As costume designer

- Atlant (1979)
- Mogzauroba Sopotshi (1979)

As set designer

- Mogzauroba Sopotshi (1979)

== Notes ==
- Mikaberidze, Alexander (ed., 2007). Jorjadze, Nana. Dictionary of Georgian National Dictionary. Retrieved on December 9, 2007.
