= Marie Clémentine Dusabejambo =

Swiss and Rwandan filmmaker

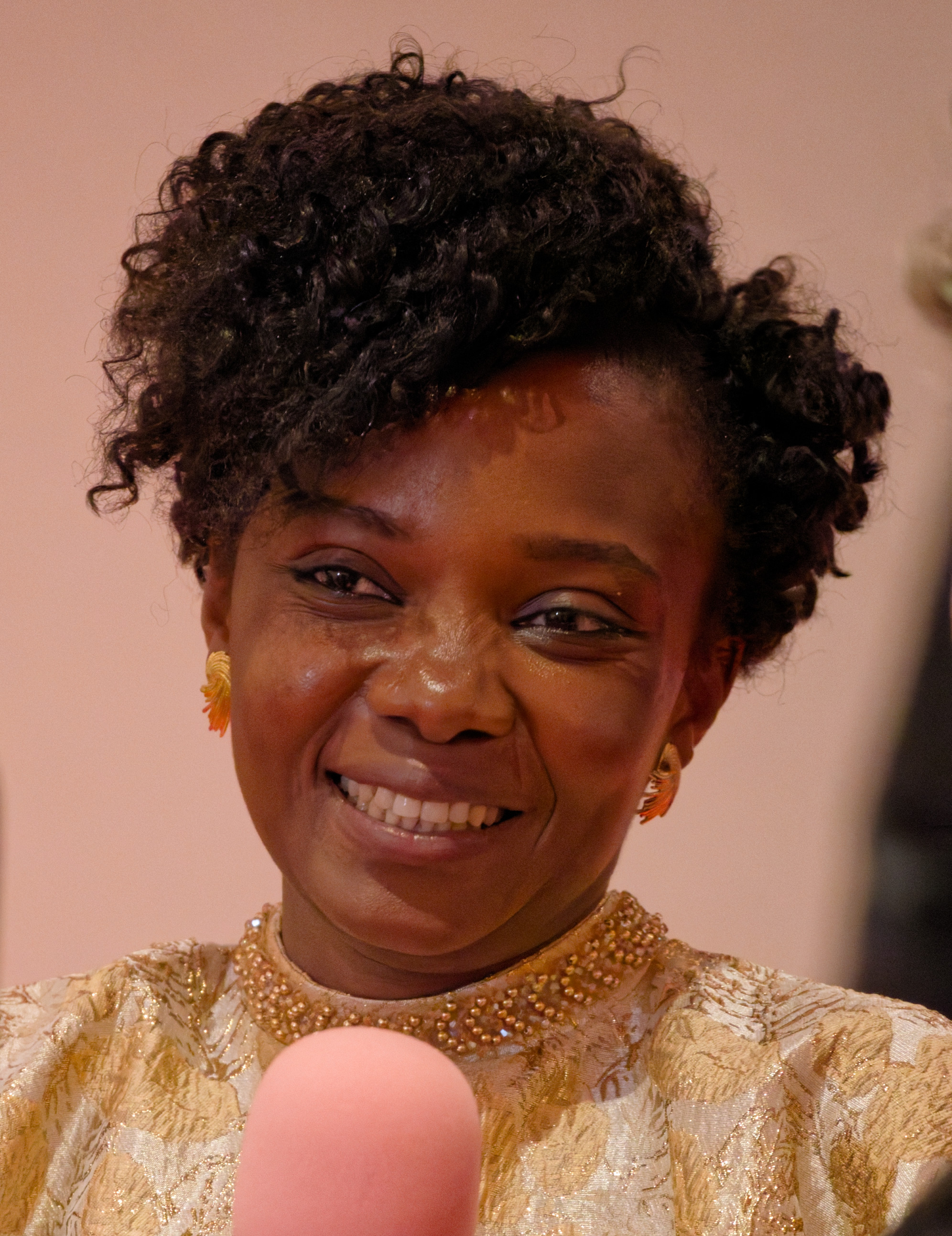
- Dusabejambo in 2026
- Born: Marie Clémentine Dusabejambo; 1987 (age 38–39); Rwanda
- Occupation: Film maker

Marie Clémentine Dusabejambo (French: [maʁi klemɑ̃tin dusabeʒambo]; born in 1987) is a Rwandan filmmaker known for films that explore the complexities of contemporary Rwandan society. In 2026, she became the first director from Rwanda to premiere a film in the Cannes Official Selection with her debut feature, Ben'Imana.

== Life ==
Marie Clémentine Dusabejambo was born in Kigali in 1987 Rwanda. She trained as an electrical and telecommunications engineer before turning to filmmaking.

Her first film, Lyiza, won a Tanit bronze award at the Carthage Film Festival in 2012. A Place for Myself (2016), her third film, follows a young Rwandan girl with albinism who struggles in the face of discrimination and stigma at school. The story was inspired by news reports of the 2007-2008 killings of people with albinism in Tanzania. The film premiered at the Goethe Institut in Kigali and was shown at the 2017 Toronto Black Film Festival. It won several awards, including the Ousmane Sembène Award at the Zanzibar International Film Festival (ZIFF); the Tanit bronze award at the Carthage Film Festival, and the Thomas Sankara Prize at FESPACO. A Place for Myself was also nominated for Best Short Film at the 2017 Africa Movie Academy Awards.

Icyasha (2018) centers on a 12-year-old boy who wants to join the neighborhood football team but is bullied for being effeminate. It was nominated for Best Short Film at ZIFF 2018, in the short films category at Carthage Film Festival, and for Best Short Film at the 2019 Africa Movie Academy Awards. It won the Golden Zébu for Panafrican Short Film at Rencontres du Film Court Madagascar 2019.

Her debut feature film, Ben'Imana premiered in the Un Certain Regard section at the Cannes Film Festival in May 2026. She was named among the six honorees for the Women in Cinema Gala hosted by the Red Sea Film Foundation during the 2026 Cannes Film Festival.

== Filmography ==
=== Feature films ===
Year	Title	Notes
2026	Ben'Imana	

=== Short films ===
- Lyiza (2011)
- Behind the Word (2013)
- A Place for Myself (2016)
- Icyasha / Etiquette (2018)
