= A Chef in Love =

- Directed by: Nana Dzhordzhadze
- Written by: Irakli Kvirikadze; André Graill
- Produced by: Temur Babluani; Alexander Rodnyansky; Thomas Bauermeister; Marc Ruscart
- Starring: Pierre Richard; Micheline Presle; Nino Kirtadze
- Cinematography: Giorgi Beridze
- Edited by: Guili Grigoriani; Vessela Martschewski
- Music by: Goran Bregović
- Distributed by: CTV International; Sony Pictures Classics
- Release date: 6 June 1996 (Georgia)
- Running time: 100 minutes
- Country: Georgia
- Language: French / Georgian
- Budget: 17,000,000 ₣ (est.)

A Chef in Love, (Georgian: შეყვარებული კულინარის 1001 რეცეპტი / Shekvarebuli kulinaris ataserti retsepti, literally, "1001 recipes of a chef in love") is a 1996 Georgian film directed by Nana Dzhordzhadze. It stars Pierre Richard and Nino Kirtadze.

== Plot ==
The film tells the story of Pascal Ichak, a French opera singer and chef living in Georgia, who opens a restaurant. It also shows the life in Georgia at the beginning of the 20th century, including its short period of independence (see Democratic Republic of Georgia). After the Bolshevik coup attempt in Georgia (1920), the chef refuses to emigrate and endures the brutalities of the new regime.

== Reception ==
A Chef in Love has an approval rating of 64% on review aggregator website Rotten Tomatoes, based on 11 reviews, and an average rating of 6.6/10.

== Awards ==
The film was selected as the Georgian entry for the Best Foreign Language Film at the 69th Academy Awards in 1997. A Chef in Love was among the final nominees for the award, but did not win.

== See also ==
- List of submissions to the 69th Academy Awards for Best Foreign Language Film
- List of Georgian submissions for the Academy Award for Best Foreign Language Film
