= 21st Rome Film Festival =

2026 edition of Rome Film Festival

Festa del Cinema di Roma
- Official poster presenting Monica Vitti, with a photograph taken by Sergio Strizzi on the set of Michelangelo Antonioni's 1962 film, L'Eclisse
- Opening film: The Noise of New Things by Paolo Genovese
- Location: Auditorium Parco della Musica, Rome
- Founded: 2006
- Awards: Best Film: I See Buildings Fall Like Lightning
- Directors: Francesca Via
- Hosted by: Cinema Per Roma Foundation; Rome City of Film
- Artistic director: Paola Malanga
- No. of films: 194
- Festival date: Opening: 13 October 2026; Closing: 25 October 2026
- Language: International
- Website: www.romacinemafest.it

Rome Film Festival
- 22nd 20th

The 21st Rome Film Festival was held from 13 October in the Auditorium Parco della Musica, Rome till 25 October 2026. Ema Stokholma, a DJ, host, actress, writer and singer, hosted the opening gala of the festival on 13 October in Sala Sinopoli of the Auditorium Parco della Musica Ennio Morricone. In opening gala Tessa Ross was honoured with Lifetime Achievement Award, followed by tribute to British film producer Jeremy Thomas and screening of opening film Italian comedy drama The Noise of New Things by Paolo Genovese.

Javier Bardem received Lifetime Achievement Award from Oscar-winning director Paolo Sorrentino. The closing ceremony and the awards presentation ceremony was held on 24 October in the Petrassi Hall of the Auditorium Parco della Musica Ennio Morricone. A co-production drama film I See Buildings Fall Like Lightning by Clio Barnard won the Best film award, while Rafiki Fariala was awarded the best director award for Congo Boy. In this edition of the festival 194 films from 55 countries had 527 screenings with the total attendance of 119,788 people.

The twenty-first edition of the festival closed on 25 October with re-run of winning films.

== Festival overview ==
This section sums up the main things taking place during the festival:

- Programme presentation

The press conference to present the programme will take place on 25 September 2026, at 11:30 AM in the Sala Santa Cecilia at the Auditorium Parco della Musica Ennio Morricone.

- Poster

The official poster of the festival celebtates Italian actress Monica Vitti, with a photograph taken by Sergio Strizzi on the set of Michelangelo Antonioni's 1962 romantic drama film, L'Eclisse. In the photograph, Vitti is surrounded by rigid geometric shapes that are found in the EUR district.

== Jury ==
The jury will give awards for best film, best director, best screenplay, best actress, best actor, and also present the grand jury prize. They will also choose a special jury prize, picked by the jury president and the other members from the remaining categories.

=== Progressive Cinema Competition Award ===
- Jan Komasa, Polish filmmaker, Jury President

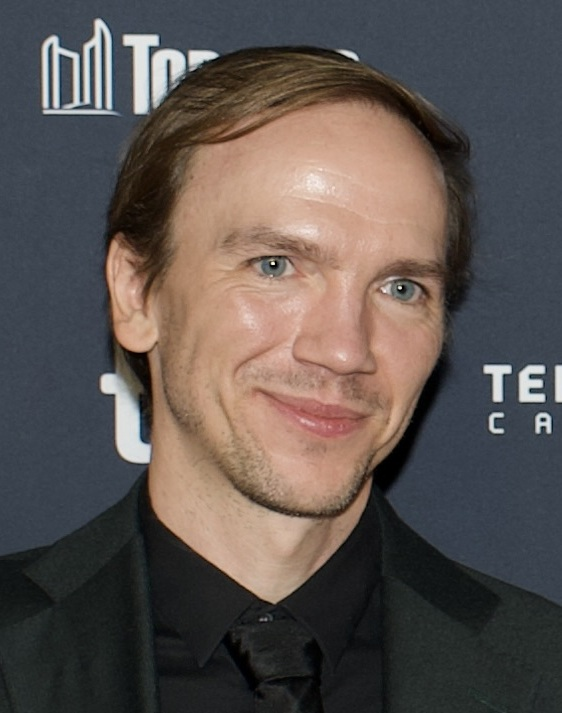
Jan Komasa, Jury President, Progressive Cinema Competition Award

- Alice Braga, Brazilian actress and producer
- Saja Kilani, Jordanian, Palestinian and Canadian actress and poet
- Carlos Marqués-Marcet, Spanish director, screenwriter and editor
- Alessio Rigo de Righi, Italian-American director and screenwriter

=== Best Documentary Award ===
- Roberto Minervini, Italian film director, screenwriter, photographer, and music producer, Jury President
- Andrea Queralt, Spanish producer
- Jessica Sarah Rinland, Argentine-British director

=== Poste Italiane best debut film award ===
- Ludovica Rampoldi, Italian screenwriter and director, Jury President
- Pauline Loquès, French director
- Corneliu Porumboiu, Romanian director, screenwriter, producer

== Events ==
=== Beauty and Quirkness: A Tribute to Goffredo Fofi ===
Goffredo Fofi was an Italian essayist, activist, journalist and film, literary and theatre critic.

In his memory, eleven films that Goffredo cared for deeply, the same ones he picked for his radio show, which later became a book, are presented again through his own voice and through the voices of the people who knew him well. These include his friends, collaborators, and those who felt connected to his free‑thinking, knowledgeable, and brave spirit: Anna Antonelli, Maurizio Braucci, Pietro Marcello, Paolo Mereghetti, Davide Minotti, Emiliano Morreale, Francesco Munzi, Lorenzo Pavolini, Georgette Ranucci, Alice Rohrwacher, and Dario Zonta.

=== Masterclasses ===
- 16 October: Paweł Pawlikowski, Polish director
- 18 October: Rodrigo Sorogoyen, Spanish director, screenwriter, and producer

== Official sections ==
The complete lineup for the edition was presented on 25 September 2026. It includes the world premiere of Bille August's Me, You and Alexandre Castagnetti’s The Phantom of the Opera, a modern adaptation of the novel of the same name by Gaston Leroux.

Three new titles were added to the lineup on 1 October 2026.

=== Opening film ===
Il rumore delle cose nuove starring Emanuela Fanelli, Claudia Pandolfi, and Vittoria Puccini, a comedy drama film was selected as the opening film of the festival.

English title	Original title	Director(s)	Production country(ies)
The Noise of New Things	Il rumore delle cose nuove	Paolo Genovese	Italy

=== Progressive Cinema Competition - Visions for the World of Tomorrow ===
This section consists of 18 titles.

† Indicates award winner.

English title	Original title	Director(s)	Production country(ies)
Ashes	Ceniza en la boca	Diego Luna	Mexico, Spain
Brianza		Simone Catania	Italy, Switzerland,
Closure		Michał Marczak	Poland
Congo Boy		Rafiki Fariala	Central African Republic, France, Democratic Republic of the Congo, Italy
Dua		Blerta Basholli	Kosovo, Switzerland, France
Eurotrash		Frauke Finsterwalder	Germany, Switzerland, Austria,
Fruit Gathering	သစ်သီးခူး	Aung Phyoe	Myanmar, Czech Republic, France
The Guest	Gæsten	Mads Mengel	Denmark
Happy Days	Giorni felici	Susanna Nicchiarelli	Italy, Belgium
I Love Boosters		Boots Riley	United States
I See Buildings Fall like Lightning †		Clio Barnard	United Kingdom, France, United States
The Life and Deaths of Wilson Shedd		Tim Blake Nelson	United States
Mustang		Kasia Smutniak	Italy
Saints	Sants	Mikel Gurrea	Spain; Italy
Skateboarding Is Not for Girls	Скејтањето не е за девојчиња	Dina Duma	North Macedonia, Belgium, Slovenia, Croatia
Ulya	Uļa	Viestur Kairish	Latvia, Poland, Estonia, Lithuania
Voila c'est fini		Gustave Kervern	France
Yesterday the Eye Didn't Sleep	البارح العين ما نامت	Rakan Mayasi	Belgium, Lebanon, Palestine, Qatar, Saudi Arabia

=== Freestyle ===
It is a non-competitive section of free-format and free-style titles, divided into the Film, Arts and Series categories.

==== Films ====
English title	Original title	Director(s)	Production country(ies)
7 Anniversaries	7 anniversari	Sabrina Iannucci	Italy, Portugal
Cambogia		Valerio Lundini	Italy
Caro mondo crudele		Niccolò Falsetti	Italy
Clementine Orange		Lisa Forslund	Sweden
Club Kid		Jordan Firstman	United States
Faith		Paul Andrew Williams	United Kingdom
The River Train	El Tren Fluvial	Lorenzo Ferro and Lucas A. Vignale	Argentina
Tangles		Leah Nelson	Canada, United States

==== Arts ====
English title	Original title	Director(s)	Production countr y(ies)
The Modigliani Affair		Luca Rea	Italy

==== Series ====
English title	Original title	Director(s)	Production country y(ies)
177 Days	177 Giorni. Il rapimento di Farouk Kassam	Carlo Carlei	Italy
All's Fair		Ryan Murphy	United States
Cagnàz: Rimini in Crime		Alessandro Roja	Italy
ChiaroScuro		Jan Maria Michelini	Italy
Melania Rea		Stefano Mordini	Italy

=== Grand public ===
English title	Original title	Director(s)	Production country y(ies)
A Dangerous Game	Un jeu dangereux	Karine Silla	France
The Debut		Jesse Eisenberg	United States
De Gaulle: Résistance	La Bataille de Gaulle: L'Âge de Fer	Antonin Baudry	France, Belgium
Desire	Desiderio	Michela Cescon	Italy
Elsinore		Simon Stone	United Kingdom
The Evening in Rome	La sera a Roma	Enrico Vanzina	Italy
Everyone's Hour	L'ora di tutti	Stefania Rocca	Italy
Ghost Song	Geister	Fatih Akin	Germany
I'm Crazy	Je so' pazzo	Nicola Prosatore	Italy
I Play Rocky		Peter Farrelly	United States
It Went Like This	È andata così	Gianni Zanasi	Italy, Spain, Albania
Just an illusion	Juste une illusion	Éric Toledano and Olivier Nakache	France
Klara and the Sun		Taika Waititi	United States, United Kingdom, New Zealand
Me, You		Bille August	Italy, France
Ministry of Love	Il ministero dell'amore	Giacomo Ciarrapico, Luca Vendruscolo	Italy
The Noise of New Things	Il rumore delle cose nuove	Paolo Genovese	Italy
The Phantom of the Opera	Le Fantôme de l'Opéra	Alexandre Castagnetti	France
The Profile of the Other	Il profilo dell'altra	Francesco Bruni	Italy
A Quiet Family Funeral	Un tranquillo funerale di famiglia	Massimiliano Bruno	Italy
The Rome Eight	Adams Acht	Hannu Salonen	Germany, Slovakia
The Roses of Marrakesh	Leila	Ginevra Elkann	Italy
Se domani non torno		Paola Randi	Italy
A Talent for Murder		Anton Corbijn	United Kingdom, Italy
You, Me, Us	Noi un po' meglio	Daniele Luchetti	Italy
Violette	Changer l'eau des fleurs	Jean-Pierre Jeunet	France, Italy
Whalefall		Brian Duffield	United States

=== Best of 2026 ===
English title	Original title	Director(s)	Production country(ies)
The Beloved	El ser querido	Rodrigo Sorogoyen	Spain, France
Ben'Imana		Marie Clémentine Dusabejambo	Rwanda, Gabon, France, Norway, Ivory Coast
Fatherland	Vaterland	Paweł Pawlikowski	Poland, France, Italy, Germany
Fjord		Cristian Mungiu	Romania, Norway, Denmark, Finland, France, Sweden
Hope	호프	Na Hong-jin	South Korea
La bola negra		Javier Calvo and Javier Ambrossi	Spain, France
A Man of His Time	Notre Salut	Emmanuel Marre	Belgium, France
Minotaur	Минотавр	Andrey Zvyagintsev	France, Latvia, Germany
Nina Roza		Geneviève Dulude-De Celles	Belgium, Bulgaria, Canada, Italy
The Only Living Pickpocket in New York (Closing film)		Noah Segan	United States
Orange-Flavoured Wedding	Mariage au goût d'orange	Christophe Honoré	France

=== Special screenings ===
Two titles were added to the section Claudia Gerini's Ricordati ragazza and Ludovico Boccianti's Kintsugi … e sono la mia opera, on 1 October 2026.

English title	Original title	Director(s)	Production country y(ies)
The Match	El partido	Juan Cabral and Santiago Franco	Argentina
Ricordati ragazza		Claudia Gerini	Italy
Kintsugi… e sono la mia opera		Ludovico Boccianti	Italy

=== History of cinema ===
It is a non-competitive section for exploring the history of Italian and international cinema, including restored versions of films and tributes.

==== Documentaries ====
English title	Original title	Director(s)	Production country(ies)
Alien Vs. Ciro		Ciro Ippolito	Italy

==== Restorations ====
English title	Original title	Director(s)	Production country(ies)
Billy Liar (1963)		John Schlesinger	United Kingdom
Boogie Nights (1997)		Paul Thomas Anderson	United States
The Eclipse (1962)	L'Eclisse	Michelangelo Antonioni	Italy
Les Amants du Pont-Neuf (1991)		Leos Carax	Italy

=== Special events ===
==== A Tribute to Brunello Rondi ====
Brunello Rondi was an Italian screenwriter and film director.

English title	Original title	Director(s)	Cast
The Flowers of St. Francis (1950)	Francesco, giullare di Dio	Roberto Rossellini	Italy

==== A Tribute to Gillo Pontecorvo ====
Gillo Pontecorvo was an Italian filmmaker associated with the political cinema movement of the 1960s and '70s.

English title	Original title	Director(s)	Cast
The Battle of Algiers	La battaglia di Algeri	Gillo Pontecorvo	Italy, Algeria

==== A Tribute to Jacques Perrin ====
Jacques Perrin was a French actor and film producer.

English title	Original title	Director(s)	Cast
The Young Girls of Rochefort	Les Demoiselles de Rochefor	Jacques Demy	France
Cinema Paradiso	Océans	Giuseppe Tornatore	France, Italy
Oceans	Nuovo Cinema Paradiso	Jacques Perrin	France, Spain

=== Tribute to Tessa Ross – Industry Lifetime Achievement Award ===
Tessa Ross, English film producer and executive.

English title	Original title	Director(s)	Production country(ies)
Billy Elliot		Stephen Daldry	United Kingdom
In Bruges		Martin McDonagh	United Kingdom, United States
The Lobster		Yorgos Lanthimos	Greece, France, Ireland, Netherlands, United Kingdom
Shame		Steve McQueen	United Kingdom
The Zone of Interest		Jonathan Glazer	United Kingdom, United States, Poland

== Alice nella città ==
The autonomous parallel section Alice nella città unfolding within Rome Film Fest dedicated to younger generations. 24th edition will run from 13 October to 25. Out of 12 films in the International Competition, six are debut features.

=== Opening film ===
- Wildwood, Travis Knight, United States

=== Competition ===
- The Accompanist, Zach Woods, United States
- Bad Beast, Bàrbara Farré, Spain
- Big Girls Don’t Cry, Paloma Schneideman, New Zealand
- Butterfly Jam, Kantemir Balagov, France
- Everytime, Sandra Wollner, Austria, Germany
- Extra Geography, Molly Manners, United Kingdom
- Gabin, Maxence Voiseux, France, Germany, Switzerland
- Iron Boy, Louis Clichy, France, Belgium
- La Gradiva, Marine Atlan, France, Italy
- The Meltdown, Manuela Martelli, Chile, United States, Spain, Mexico
- Selfie – Lato B, Agostino Ferrente, Italy
- We Are Aliens, Kohei Kadowaki, Japan, France

=== Out of competition ===
- Se domani non torno by Paola Randi, Italy

=== Panorama Italia – Out of Competition ===
- Se ami qualcuno dillo, Marco Bonini
- Parla con me by Sophie Chiarell
- Carmelo – Dalla porta di Dozier alla porta del Notorious, Corrado Rizza
- Un altro giorno insieme, Alessandro Guida
- L’elisir d’amore, Andrea Brusa

== Awards ==
=== Progressive Cinema Competition ===
The Progressive Cinema Competition jury formed by Jan Komasa, Alice Braga, Saja Kilani, Carlos Marques-Marcet, and Alessio Rigo de Righi awarded the following prizes:

- Best Film: I See Buildings Fall Like Lightning by Clio Barnard
- Jury Grand Prix: The Life and Deaths of Wilson Shedd by Tim Blake Nelson
- Best Director: Rafiki Fariala for Congo Boy
- Best Screenplay: Abia Castillo, Diego Rabasa, and Diego Luna for Ashes
- Best Actress: Victoria Luengo for Saints
- Best Actor: Anthony Boyle for I See Buildings Fall Like Lightning and Paolo Pierobon for Brianza
- Special Jury Prize to the Al Mawla family for Yesterday the Eye Didn't Sleep

=== Poste Italiane Best First Feature Award ===
- Clementine Orange by Lisa Forslund

=== Best Documentary Award ===
- Into the Jaws of the Ogre by Mahsa Karampour
- Special Mention: A Russian Winter by Patric Chiha

=== Terna Audience Award ===
- Congo Boy by Rafiki Fariala – ex aequo
- Mustang by Kasia Smutniak – ex aequo

=== Lifetime Achievement Award ===
- Javier Bardem, Spanish actor

Javier Bardem recipient of Lifetime Achievement Award

- Julianne Moore, American actress

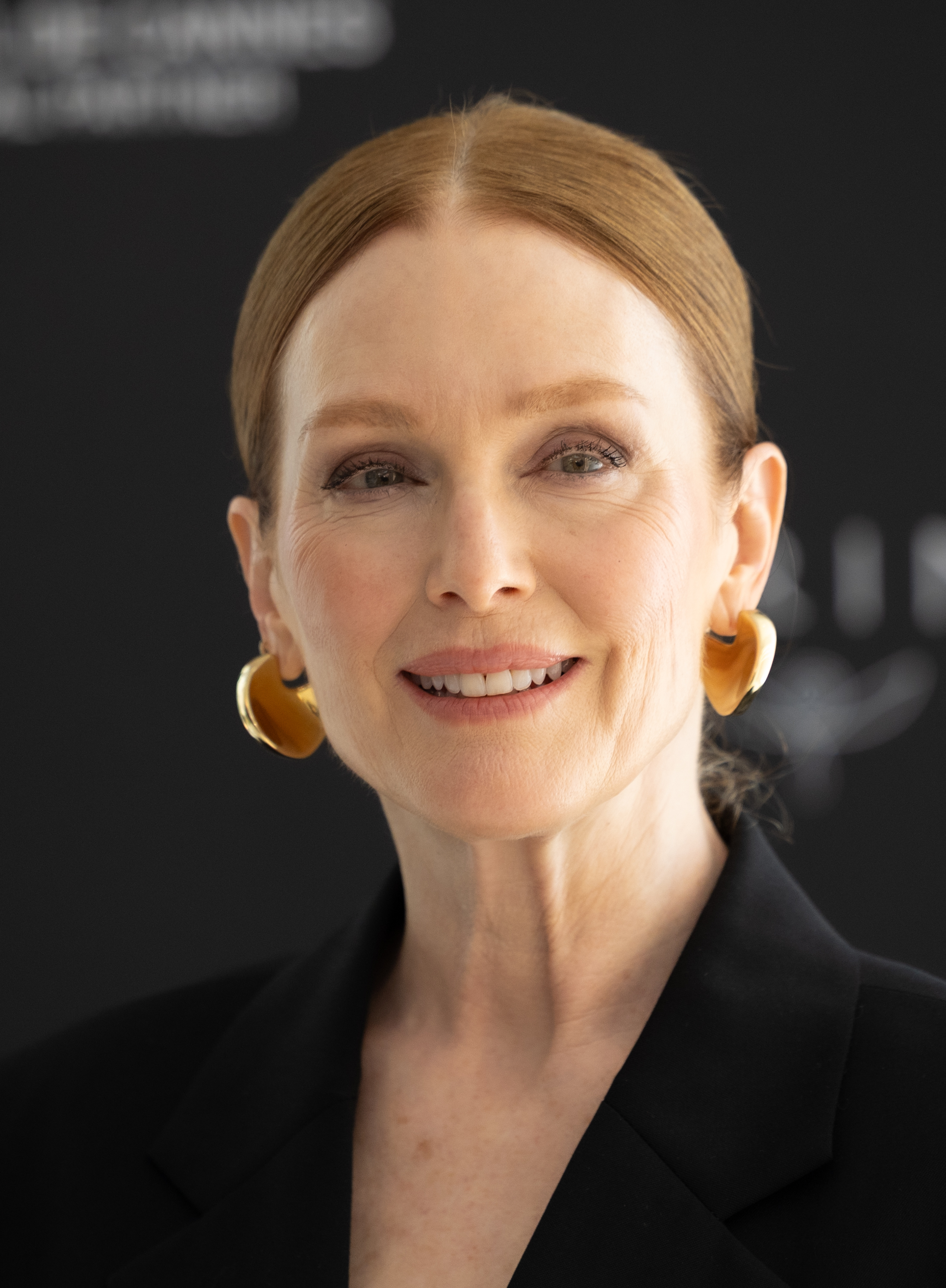
Julianne Moore recipient of Lifetime Achievement Award

=== Industry Lifetime Achievement Award ===
- Tessa Ross, English film producer and executive

=== Banca Ifis Music Award ===
Starting from the 21st edition, a new prize called the Banca Ifis Music Award will be presented by Banca Ifis in partnership with the Rome Cinema Foundation and the Rome Music Foundation. Composer Nicola Piovani is the first person to receive this award.

- Nicola Piovani, Italian composer of contemporary classical music and film, television, and theatrical scores

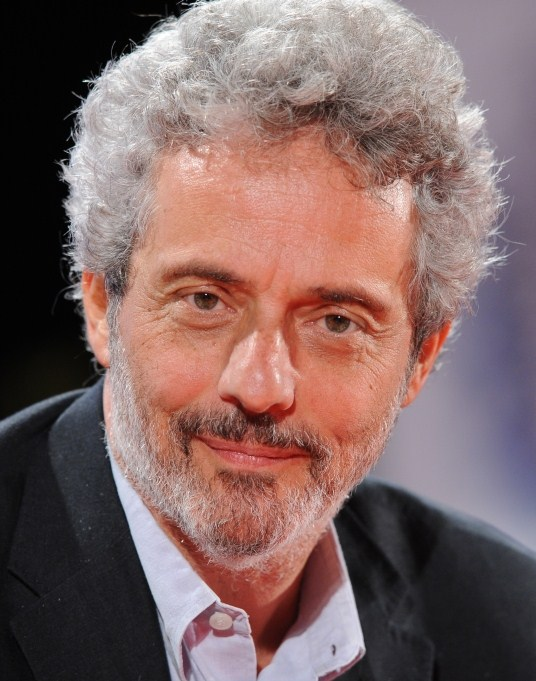
Nicola Piovani recipient of Banca Ifis Music Award

=== Gillo Pontecorvo Award ===
From this edition another award in memory of the Italian director Gillo Pontecorvo on the twentieth anniversary of his death will be presented by his son Marco Pontecorvo. Emmanuel Marre's A Man of His Time will be the first awardee.

- A Man of His Time by Emmanuel Marre

=== Progressive Lifetime Achievement Award ===
- Anthony Ippolito, American actor

Anthony Ippolito recipient of Progressive Lifetime Achievement Award

=== Alice nella città ===
On 24 October 2026, the winners of Alice nella Città were announced:

- Best Film Award - Everytime, Sandra Wollner
- Special Mention - We Are Aliens, Kohei Kadowaki
- Audience Award for Best Film
  - Panorama Italia - Lost Children by Lorenzo Maria Chierici
- Raffaella Fioretta Award (Italian Cinema): Without Asking Permission by Giacomo Mazzariol
- RB Casting Award - Best Young Italian Actor - Francesco Castellaneta for It's a Difficult World by Federico Mottica
  - Special Mention to the entire cast of It's a Difficult World
- UNITA Under 35 Award - Matteo Oscar Giuggioli for Lost Children by Lorenzo Maria Chierici
- Special Mention - Nicole Bellisario for Without Asking Permission by Giacomo Mazzariol
- Award for Best International Short Film in the Short Waves section - Laser-Gato by Lucas Acher
- Raffaella Fioretta Award for Best Short Film in the Italian Panorama - A Hundred Thieves by Giada Bossi
- Onde Corte Academy Award - Mara by Irene Z'graggen
- Premiere Film Award - Scogli by Michela Balzarotti
- Under 35 Enterprise Film Award - One Is a Stick by Giada Cicchetti and Agnese Rizzari
- Rai Cinema Channel Award - Milk by Filippo Marasco
- Womenlands Excellence Award:

Susan Sarandon, American actor

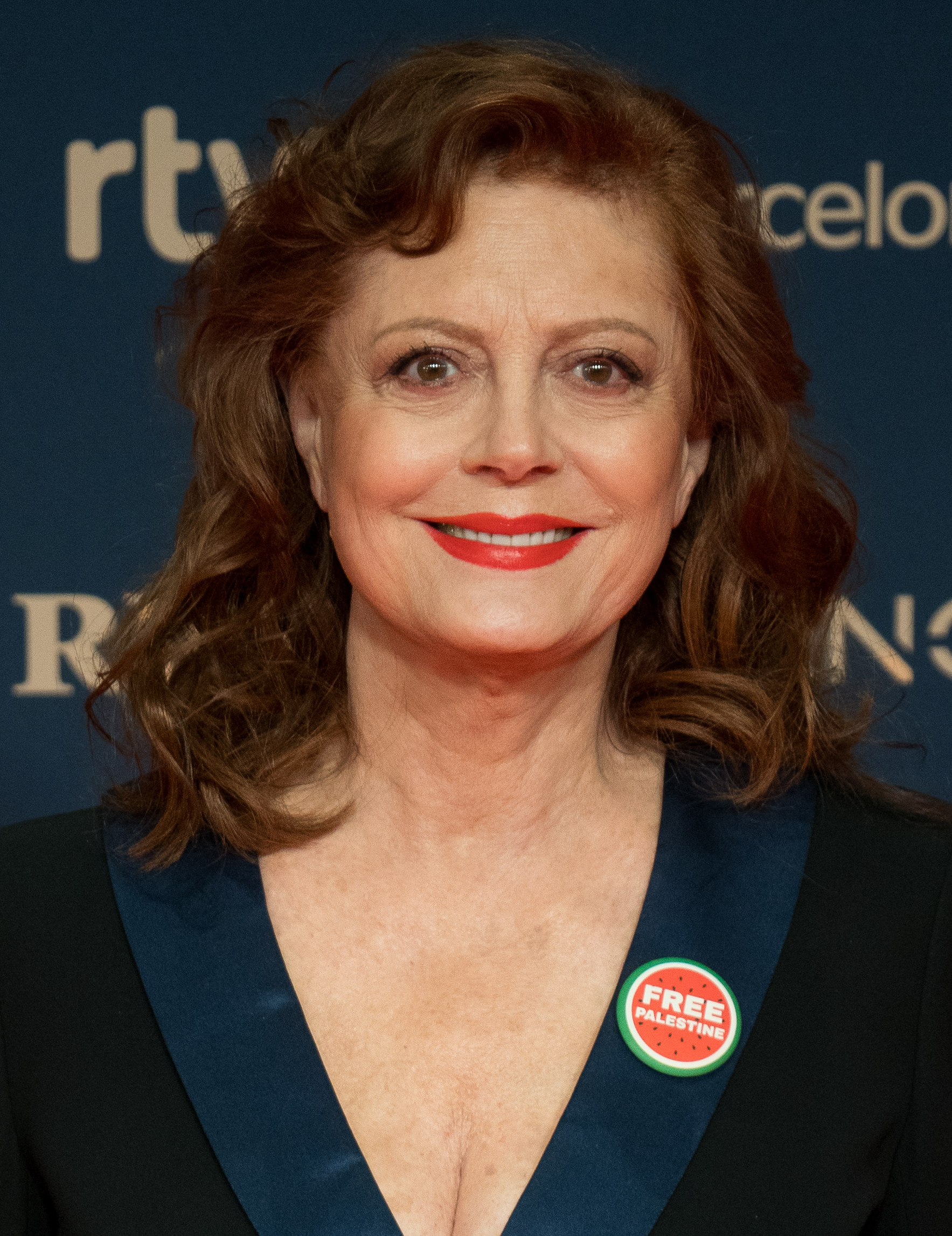
Susan Sarandon recipient of Womenlands Excellence Award
