= Exzenterhaus =

Office building in Bochum, Germany

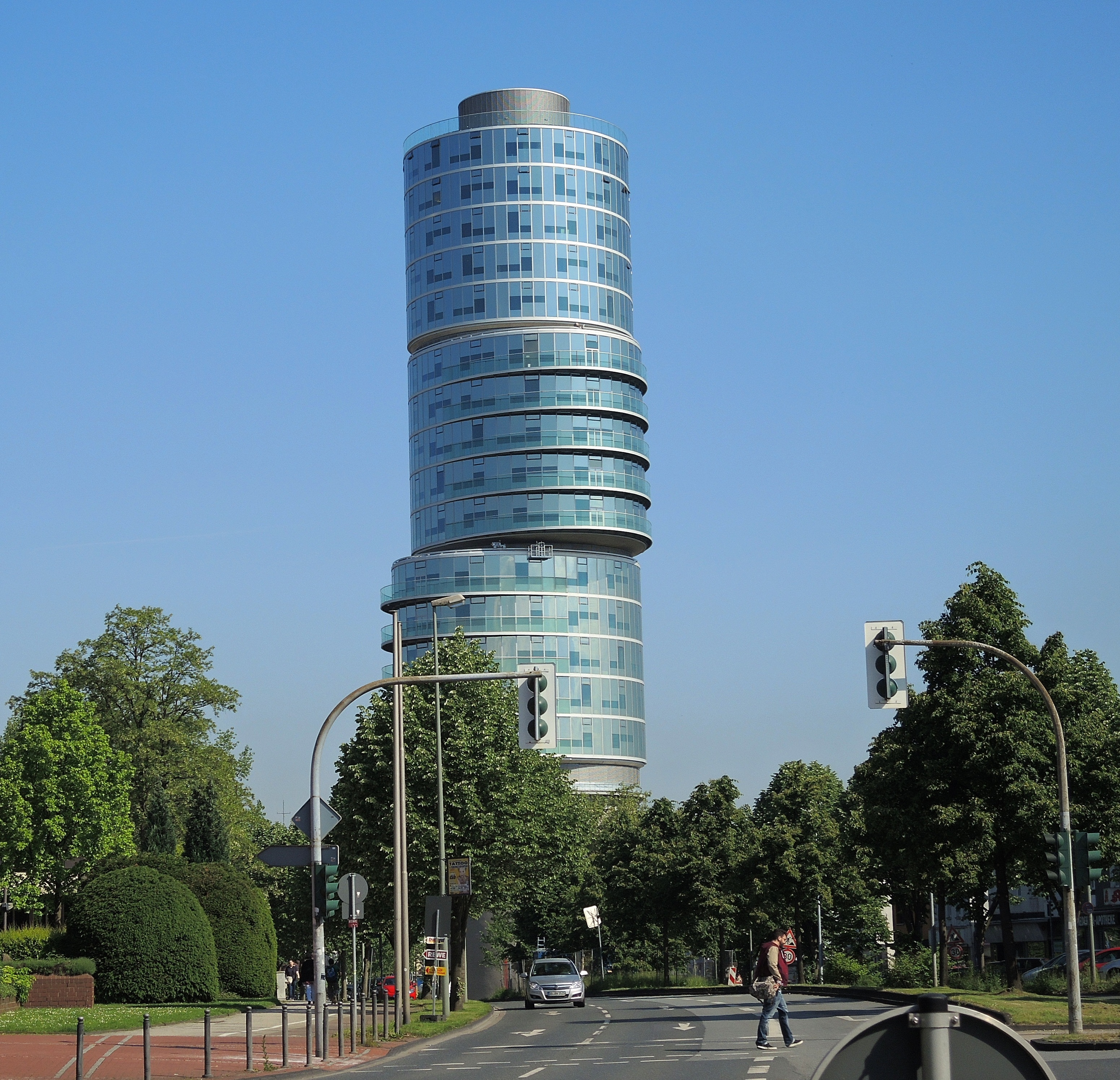
- Interactive map of the Exzenterhaus area

General information
- Type: Commercial offices
- Location: Universitätsstraße 60; Bochum; North Rhine-Westphalia, Germany; 44789
- Coordinates: 51.472996°N 7.226132°E
- Construction started: 2009
- Opening: 2013
- Owner: Exzenterhaus Bochum GmbH & Co. KG

Height
- Architectural: 88.6 m (291 ft)
- Tip: 90.5 m (297 ft)

Technical details
- Floor count: 23
- Floor area: 5,250 m^{2} (56,500 sq ft)

Design and construction
- Architect: Gerhard Spangenberg
- Structural engineer: Drees & Sommer Advanced Building; GuD Planungsgesellschaft für Ingenieurbau mbH; Schlaich Bergermann und Partner

The Exzenterhaus is a commercial office building in Bochum, Germany. Designed by architect Gerhard Spangenberg, the building was constructed on top of an air raid shelter built during the World War II era.

== Overview ==
The cylindrical bomb shelter stands 22 metres and was constructed in 1942. The structure was built with 520 beds and 52 seats, but would accommodate more than 3,000 people during air raids on Bochum. The bunker was left empty for many years following the war. The city sold the bunker to the builder of the Exzenterhaus for €670,000. Construction on the building started in 2009 and was completed in 2013. The building rises 15 storeys above the top of the bunker and at an overall height of 90.5 metre, it is the tallest building in Bochum. The name Exzenterhaus literately means "eccentric house" in German, which itself is derived from the Latin phrase "ex centro", meaning off-centre.

The newer portion of the structure is separated in three different five-storey sections shaped like polycentric rings, each which cantilever up to 4.5 meters, giving the impression of a twisting structure. Each of the top fifteen storeys features a balcony when extends in the direction that floor's section's cantilever. The first two floors of the bunker portion of the structure contains a reception area, while the remainder of this portion is used for archival and storage purposes. It is located adjacent the Oskar-Hofmann-Straße station of the Bochum Stadtbahn.

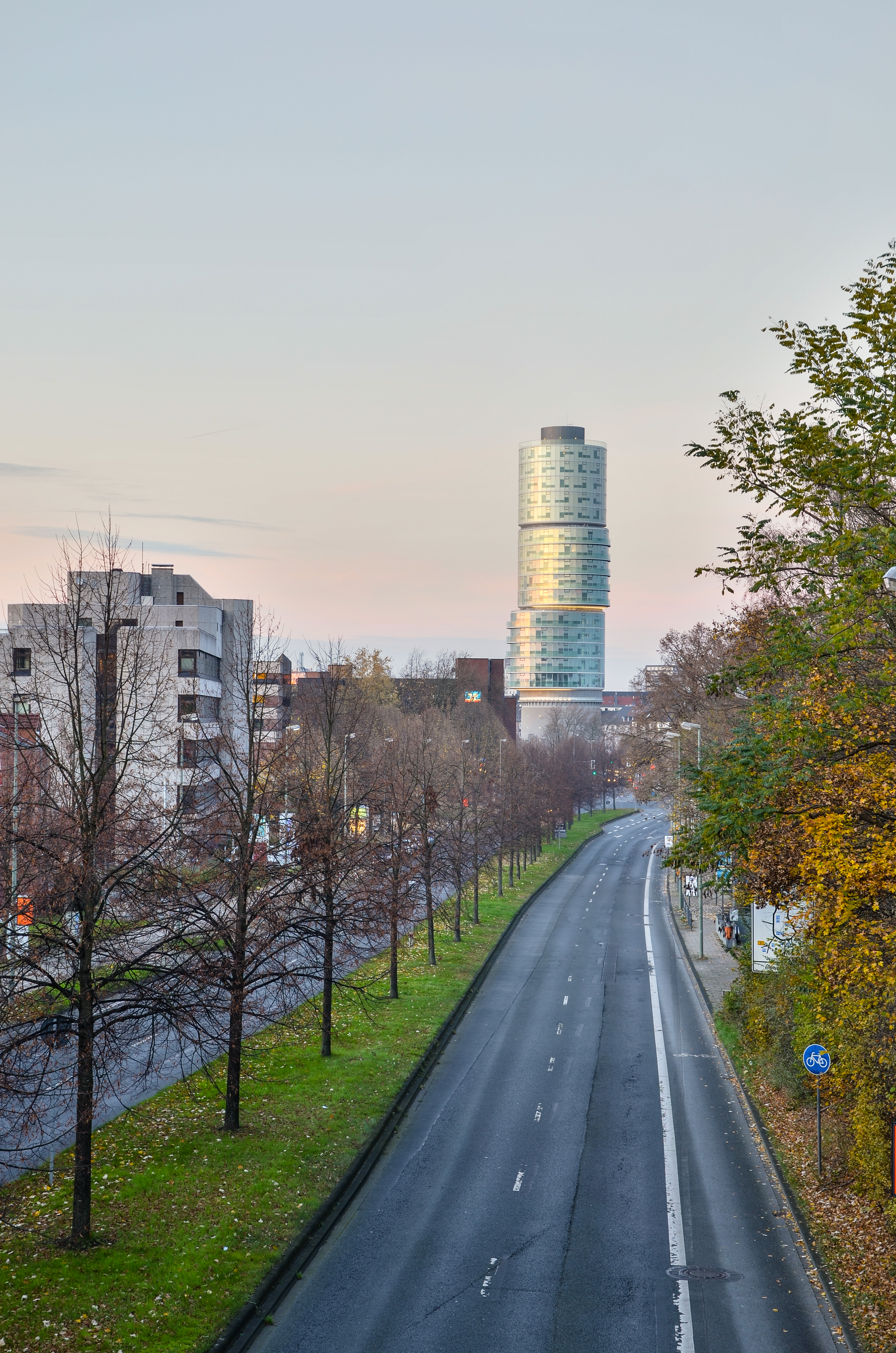
