= Congo Boy =

2026 musical-drama film by Rafiki Fariala

- International promotional poster
- Directed by: Rafiki Fariala
- Written by: Rafiki Fariala; Tommy Baron; Boris Lojkine
- Produced by: Vicky Nelson Wackoro; Dieudo Hamadi; Caroline Nataf; Boris Lojkine; Daniele Incalcaterra
- Starring: Bradley Fiomona Dembeasset; Christy Djomanda Louba; Pétruche Mbomba; Rosiana Kotozia; Gloria Ambacko
- Cinematography: Adrien Lallau
- Edited by: César Simonot; Xavier Sirven
- Music by: Rafiki Fariala; Lillo Morreale
- Production companies: Makongo Films; Karta Film; Kiripi Films; Unité
- Release date: 15 May 2026 (Cannes)
- Running time: 95 minutes
- Countries: Central African Republic; DR Congo; France; Italy
- Languages: Sango; French; Lingala; Swahili

Congo Boy is a 2026 musical drama directed by Rafiki Fariala, co-written with Tommy Baron and Boris Lojkine. Fariala co-wrote wrote the music with Lillo Morealle. It stars Bradley Fiomona Dembeasset, Christy Djomanda Louba, Pétruche Mbomba, Rosiana Kotozia and Gloria Ambacko.

The film had its world premiere in the Un Certain Regard section of the 2026 Cannes Film Festival on 15 May, where Dembeasset won the section's Best Actor prize.

== Premise ==
Set in Bangui, Central African Republic, the coming-of-age story follows Robert, a 17-year-old Congolese whose family are displaced by war in the neighboring Democratic Republic of Congo. With both his parents in prison for falsifying their passports, Robert struggles to balance caring for his younger siblings, keeping up with school, and pursuing a budding musical career as a rap artist.

== Cast ==
- Bradley Fiomona Dembeasset as Robert
- Christy Djomanda Louba as Espérance
- Pétruche Mbomba as Daniel
- Rosiana Kotozia as Aurélie
- Gloria Ambacko as Jacqueline
- Dieufera Sana as César

== Production ==
Congo Boy follows writer-director Rafiki Fariala's debut documentary We Students! (2022), which became the first feature from the Central African Republic to screen at the Berlin International Film Festival. The project was unveiled at the Atlas Workshops of the Marrakech International Film Festival, where it was presented as part of its development slate.

Congo Boy is a co-production between companies from the Central African Republic, the Democratic Republic of the Congo, and France. It is produced by Vicky Nelson Wackoro for Makongo Films, with co-producers Dieudo Hamadi for Kiripi Films and Caroline Nataf for Unité.

== Release ==
Congo Boy had its world premiere in the Un Certain Regard section at the 2026 Cannes Film Festival on 15 May. It was one of three African films in the festival's official section.

It was screened in the Kinoscope section of the 32nd Sarajevo Film Festival in August 2026.

The film will compete at the 21st Rome Film Festival in 'Progressive Cinema Competition - Visions for the World of Tomorrow' in October 2026.
