= The Noise of New Things =

2026 Italian comedy drama film

- Promotional poster
- Italian: Il rumore delle cose nuove
- Directed by: Paolo Genovese
- Screenplay by: Paolo Genovese; Igor Artibani
- Story by: Paolo Genovese
- Based on: Il rumore delle cose nuove by Paolo Genovese
- Produced by: Raffaella Leone; Andrea Leone
- Starring: Emanuela Fanelli; Claudia Pandolfi; Vittoria Puccini; Stefano Accorsi; Lino Musella; Edoardo Pesce
- Cinematography: Fabrizio Lucci
- Edited by: Consuelo Catucci
- Music by: Daprinski
- Production companies: Lotus Production; Rai Cinema; Disney+
- Distributed by: 01 Distribution
- Release dates: 13 October 2026 (Rome); 12 November 2026 (Theaters)
- Running time: 113 minutes
- Country: Italy
- Language: Italian

The Noise of New Things (Italian: Il rumore delle cose nuove) is a 2026 Italian comedy drama film directed by Paolo Genovese based on his own 2023 eponymous novel. Starring Emanuela Fanelli, Claudia Pandolfi, Vittoria Puccini, Stefano Accorsi, Lino Musella, and Edoardo Pesce, the film follows three different and unknown couples who share the cage they've built for themselves.

The film opened the 21st Rome Film Festival on 13 October 2026 and had its world premiere at the Auditorium Parco della Musica.

== Synopsis ==
The film follows seven people whose lives seem far apart but are suddenly pulled together after one unexpected meeting that exposes long buried secrets among these three Milan families. A child’s arrival disrupts their fragile balance, forcing each of them to confront hidden truths, old wounds, and the lies they’ve carried for years. Each person must face what they’ve been hiding—from others and from themselves.

== Cast ==
- Emanuela Fanelli
- Claudia Pandolfi as Viola
- Vittoria Puccini
- Stefano Accorsi
- Lino Musella
- Edoardo Pesce
- Claudio Santamaria
- Ettore Nicoletti

== Production ==
Filming began on 5 November 2025 with a seven weeks schedule in Milan and Rome.

The film was wrapped up in February 2026.

== Release ==
The Noise of New Things was screened in TIFF's Market under Market Screening programme at the 2026 Toronto International Film Festival on 9 September 2026, before its world premiere.

It had its world premiere at the 21st Rome Film Festival as opening film on 13 October 2026. The film was screened in the Grand Public section during the Fest's opening ceremony, hosted by DJ and TV and radio host Ema Stokholma. Subsequently it will be released in Italian cinemas by 01 Distribution on 12 November 2026.

The film was sold by Rai Cinema International Distribution to Spain (Karma Films); Poland (Aurora Film); Hungary (Vertigo Media); Greece and Cyprus (Dream Team Film); and Albania, Bosnia and Herzegovina, Croatia, Kosovo, Macedonia, Montenegro, Serbia and Slovenia (Kino Mediteran) at Cannes Film Market in May 2026.
