= Ludovica Nasti =

Italian actress (born 2006)

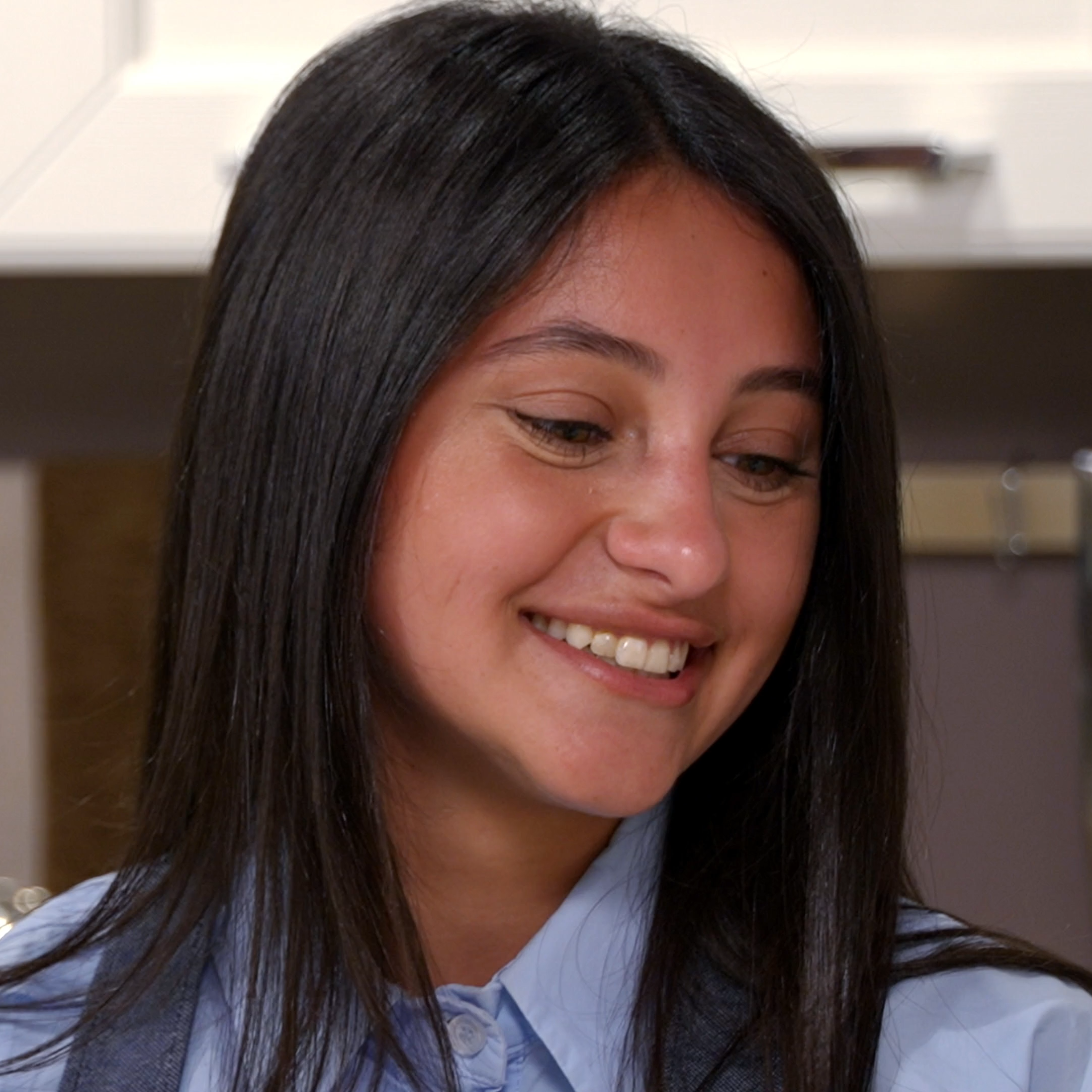
- Ludovica Nasti in September 2025
- Born: 26 September 2006 (age 19); Pozzuoli, Naples, Campania, Italy
- Occupation: Actress
- Years active: 2019–present

Ludovica Nasti (born 26 September 2006) is an Italian actress.

== Life and career ==
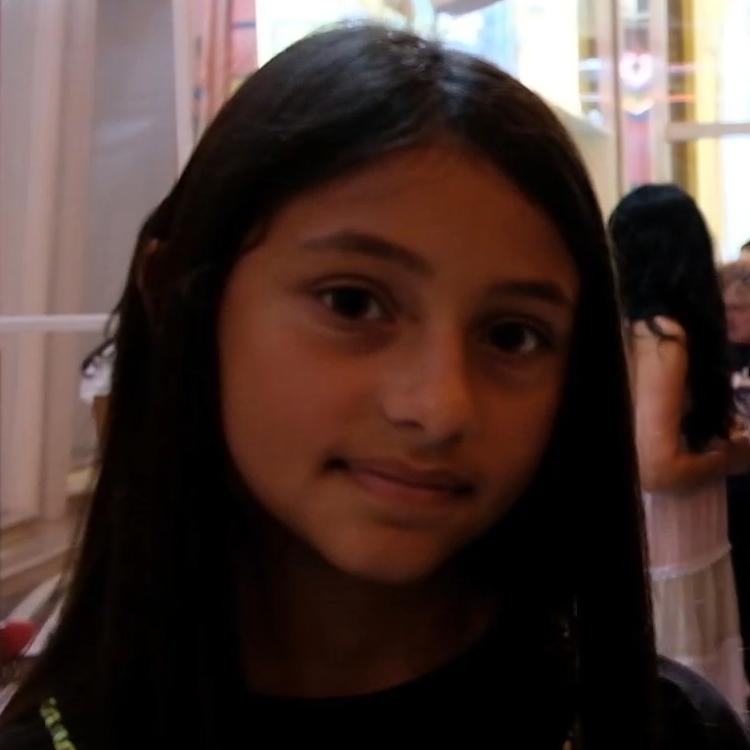
Ludovica Nasti in July 2019

Originally from Pozzuoli, Nasti is the youngest of three children. At the age of five, she was diagnosed with lymphoblastic leukemia, from which she was later cured in 2016.

After working as a model for catalogues, she made her acting debut in 2018, playing the role of Lila in the first season of the television series My Brilliant Friend, produced by RAI and based on the novels by Elena Ferrante. The following year she played the role of Mia Parisi in the soap opera Un posto al sole, and in 2020 she made her film debut in the film Rose Stone Star by Marcello Sannino.

She then starred in the main cast of films such as Mondocane and Con tutto il cuore, but gained a reputation among the general public thanks to her role as Viola in the successful Rai 1 television series Mina Settembre. In 2025, she had her first leading role in the film The Story of Frank and Nina, and graduated from the linguistic high school in Pozzuoli.

== Filmography ==
=== Film ===
Year	Title	Role	Notes
2019	Fame	Youngest daughter	Short film
2020	Guardami così	Daughter	Short film
2020	Rose Stone Star	Maria	Film
2021	Mondocane	Sabrina	Film
2022	Il nostro nome è Anna		Short film
2023	Con tutto il cuore	Little girl	Film
2023	Grosso guaio all'Esquilino - La leggenda del kung fu	Yasmin	Film
2023	The Runner		Short film
2023	Holy Shoes	Marianna	Film
2024	The Story of Frank and Nina	Nina	Film

=== Television ===
Year	Title	Role	Notes
2018–2020	My Brilliant Friend	Raffaella Cerullo	TV series
2022	Romulus	Vibia	TV series
2022–2025	Mina Settembre	Viola De Luca	TV series
2025	Noi del Rione Sanità	Anna	TV series
2025	The Leopard	Miss Bastiana	TV miniseries
2026	La preside	Lucia Ruotolo	TV series

== Awards and nominations ==
Year	Award	Category	Work	Result	Notes
2019	Globo d'oro	Best New Actress	My Brilliant Friend	Won	
2019	Flaiano Award for Television and Radio	President's Award	My Brilliant Friend	Won	
2025	Nastro d'argento	New Imaie Award	La storia del Frank e della Nina	Won	
