= The Story of Frank and Nina =

2024 comedy-drama film

- Directed by: Paola Randi
- Written by: Paola Randi; Valia Santella
- Produced by: Domenico Procacci; Laura Paolucci
- Starring: Samuele Teneggi; Ludovica Nasti
- Cinematography: Matteo Carlesimo
- Edited by: Andrea Maguolo
- Music by: Zeno Gabaglio
- Release date: 31 August 2024 (Venice)
- Language: Italian

The Story of Frank and Nina (Italian: La storia del Frank e della Nina) is a 2024 Italian comedy-drama film co-written and directed by Paola Randi. It premiered at the 81st edition of the Venice Film Festival, in the Orizzonti Extra section.

== Cast ==
- Samuele Teneggi as Frank
- Ludovica Nasti as Nina
- Gabriele Monti as Gollum
- Marco Bonadei as Duce
- Bruno Bozzetto as the Commander
- Giuseppe Dave Seke as the Count
- Anna Ferzetti as Frank's mother
