= Mondocane =

2021 Italian film

- Directed by: Alessandro Celli
- Screenplay by: Alessandro Celli; Antonio Leotti
- Produced by: Matteo Rovere; Santo Versace; Gianluca Curti
- Starring: Alessandro Borghi; Barbara Ronchi
- Cinematography: Giuseppe Maio
- Edited by: Clelio Benevento
- Release date: 2021
- Language: Italian

Mondocane, also known as Dogworld, is a 2021 Italian post-apocalyptic crime drama film written and directed by Alessandro Celli.

The film premiered in the Venice International Critics' Week sidebar at the 78th edition of the Venice Film Festival.

== Plot ==
On the beach outside a favela, young boys Pietro and Cristian fish a crucifix out of the ocean. Cristian has a seizure and is cared for by Pietro. Pietro tells Cristian that he has been given a task by the Ants, a local gang made up mostly of children, he is supposed to burn down a pet store called Mondocane (Dog World). The two return to the fishing boat they live aboard with an old man. That night they burn down the shop together.

A police officer, Katia, investigates the scene of the arson. She interviews a young girl, Sabrina, who often snuck out of her orphanage to see the dogs in the pet shop. After questioning, she takes Sabrina back to the orphanage where we discover that Katia had grown up there herself.

Pietro is taken to see Hothead. He refuses to join the gang unless Cristian is allowed to join too. The gang does not want Cristian because of his seizure disorder and so reject Pietro. Pietro tells Cristian the news just as the old man they live with dies suddenly. The two boys take the crucifix and go looking for the Ants. After seeing stray children rounded up by law enforcement, they are taken to the Ants and Hothead. They are allowed to join the gang on the condition that they help break into a wealthy person’s home. Inside they find the owner hiding in a closet and Cristian informs the gang. She is threatened for the combination to her safe. Pietro looks away while Cristian does not. They are both made members of the gang.

Pietro and Cristian sneak onto a beach patronized by wealthy people. There, they meet Sabrina, her orphanage takes the children there every day for exercise. She recognizes that they are from the favela, but swears not to tell anyone if they take her to see her parents' grave, located in a forbidden area. The boys agree. Pietro and Cristian are taken on a mission to assassinate a former member of the Ants who has betrayed the gang. They are left to guard the motorcycles but sneak closer to the action. Pietro sees the assassination target trying to escape and pulls his gun on him but does not shoot. Cristian shoots the man multiple times. During the celebration of the successful mission, Hothead pulls Cristian aside and tells him that he knows Pietro did not fire his gun.

Pietro and Cristian return to the beach where they met Sabrina. Cristian returns to the gang hideout while Pietro takes Sabrina to the grave of her parents. On his return to the hideout he finds out that he was missing for so long that another gang member was sent out to look for him. That gang member was caught by the police.

Katia questions the child before transferring him to another facility for more intense questioning. The Ants stage a rescue, but are tricked by an empty convoy of vehicles controlled with a remote control. At the facility the captured gang member breaks free and leaps through a high window to his death. When news of his death reaches Hothead he has Pietro beaten and thrown into a makeshift cell. Cristian suggests that Pietro be given a chance to prove his loyalty. Pietro is tasked with assassinating Katia the policewoman. Pietro waits on the sidewalk for Katia’s car to drive by. He steps into the road and pulls his gun only to see that Sabrina is in the car next to Katia. He does not fire his gun, so Hothead and the Ants fire on both Pietro and the car, killing Katia. Pietro and Sabrina run for the ocean and get away. The Ants go looking for the pair. They eventually corner them on the docks. Sabrina escapes by boat while Pietro hides in a warehouse. Pietro is found by Cristian who calls out to the gang.The two struggle when Cristian has a seizure. Hothead rushes to what he believes to be Cristian’s writhing body, only to discover that it is Pietro wearing Cristian’s motorcycle helmet. Pietro shoots Hothead before closing a warehouse door behind him and fleeing. He climbs his way onto a rail car. The film ends with Pietro being taken out of the city atop the train.

== Cast ==
- Alessandro Borghi as Testacalda (Hothead in English)
- Barbara Ronchi as Katia
- Dennis Protopapa as Pietro "Mondocane"
- Giuliano Soprano as Cristian "Pisciasotto"
- Adriano Novelli as Bombino
- Lavinia Novelli as Randagia
- Ludovica Nasti as Sabrina
- Federica Torchetti as Sanghe
- Josafat Vagni as Tiradritto
- Francesco Simon as poliziotto
- Pinuccio Sinisi as Fulmine
