= Into Paradiso =

2010 Italian crime-comedy film

- Directed by: Paola Randi
- Screenplay by: Antonella Antonia Paolini; Paola Randi; Luca Infascelli; Chiara Barzini
- Starring: Gianfelice Imparato
- Cinematography: Mario Amura
- Music by: Fausto Mesolella
- Release date: 2010
- Language: Italian

Into Paradiso is a 2010 Italian crime-comedy film co-written and directed by Paola Randi, in her directorial debut. It premiered at the 67th edition of the Venice Film Festival, in the Controcampo Italiano sidebar. It was nominated for four David di Donatello Awards, for best new director, best score, best sets and decorations and best visual effects.

== Cast ==
- Gianfelice Imparato as Alfonso D'Onofrio
- Saman Anthony as Gayan
- Eloma Ran Janz as Giacinta
- Gianni Ferreri as Colasanti
- Peppe Servillo as Vincenzo Cacace
- Shatzi Mosca as Venezia
