= Anwar Hamed =

Palestinian writer

Anwar Hamed (Arabic: أنور حامد; born 1957) is a Palestinian novelist and poet.

Hamed was born in Anabta, Palestine, and went to Hungary for college. His first short stories were published in Arabic when he was still a teenager in the West Bank, but after moving to Hungary, he started writing in Hungarian.

His first novels were written in Hungarian. Since 2004, Hamed has been living in London, where he worked for BBC Arabic between 2004 and 2024. He has published over 100 articles on the BBCArabic website, mostly in the field of Arts and Culture.

His short story “The Key” was adapted into a short film by Rakan Mayasi. Of the work, The Conversation said Hamed "has applied a science-fiction sensibility to established motifs in Palestinian literature". Middle East Eye calls the story, in which "Palestinian ghosts torment the Israelis of the future", "a powerful allegory, one that holds sway in a collective consciousness of a displaced people".

His most recent novel is Ghosts and Doppelgangers – أشباه وأشباح – was published in Arabic in 2023.

== Awards ==
His short story entitled “The Key”, published in English, was longlisted for British Science Fiction Association Award 2019.

His novel Jaffa Prepares Morning Coffee was longlisted for the 2013 Arabic Booker Prize.

== Selected works, in Arabic ==
- The Bridge of Babylon جسور وشروخ وطيور لا تحلق
- Stones of Pain حجارة الألم
- Scheherazade Tells Tales No More
- jenin 2002جنين 2002
- Bewildered taste of passion والتيه والزيتون
- Fragmentation شجن
- Jaffa Prepares Morning Coffee يافا تعد قهوة الصباح
- Jenin 2002
- Outsider غريب ()
- Chronicle of Fragmentation!أشباه وأشباح
- Literary theory: An attempt towards the definition of the function of
