= I Play Rocky =

2026 film by Peter Farrelly

- Theatrical release poster
- Directed by: Peter Farrelly
- Written by: Peter Gamble
- Produced by: Toby Emmerich; Christian Baha; Peter Farrelly; Paul Currie; Michele Weiss
- Starring: Anthony Ippolito; AnnaSophia Robb; Toby Kebbell; P. J. Byrne; Jay Duplass; Matt Dillon; Stephan James; Tracy Letts
- Cinematography: Sean Porter
- Edited by: Sam Seig
- Music by: Dave Palmer
- Production companies: Baha Productions; Fireside Films; FilmNation Entertainment
- Distributed by: Metro-Goldwyn-Mayer (through Amazon MGM Studios)
- Release dates: September 12, 2026 (TIFF); November 6, 2026 (United States)
- Running time: 128 minutes
- Country: United States
- Language: English
- Budget: $30-35 million
- Box office: $15.1 million

I Play Rocky is a 2026 American biographical drama film directed by Peter Farrelly and written by Peter Gamble. It stars Anthony Ippolito, AnnaSophia Robb, Toby Kebbell, P. J. Byrne, Jay Duplass, Matt Dillon, Stephan James, and Tracy Letts. In the film, Sylvester Stallone (Ippolito) battles tumultuous production to portray the titular character of his self-written film, Rocky (1976).

Development on the film began in May 2024, with Farrelly and Gamble attached. Ippolito was cast in August 2025, and the rest of the main cast was rounded out by that October. Stallone was not involved in the film's production, claiming he had not been contacted: this was disputed by Farrelly, who claimed he advised Stallone against being named as a producer to avoid audience concerns about the film's factual accuracy. Principal photography took place in October 2025, with filming locations including New York City, Philadelphia, and Los Angeles.

I Play Rocky premiered at the 2026 Toronto International Film Festival, where it was nominated for the People's Choice Award, and began a limited theatrical release in the United States on November 6, 2026, before expanding into a larger, theatrical release on November 20, by Amazon MGM Studios. It has grossed $15 million worldwide. I Play Rocky has received generally positive reviews from critics, with praise for Ippolito's performance.

== Plot ==
In the early 1970s, Mike Stallone struggles to make it as an actor in New York City, living on the edge of homelessness while juggling low-paying jobs and auditions. Sleeping outside one night, Mike finds and adopts a puppy that he names Butkus. He reluctantly stars in a softcore pornography film to help pay his rent.

Mike starts to date his coworker Sasha Czack, and introduces her to his father, Frank. Frank is dismissive of his son's acting aspirations and sees him as unintelligent, much to Sasha's disgust. She encourages Mike to start using his real name, Sylvester, and to try his hand at writing scripts. Sylvester and Sasha marry and relocate to Los Angeles. A friend introduces Sylvester to film producers Robert Chartoff and Irwin Winkler, who have little interest but meet with him as a courtesy to discuss his idea for a union movie. On the way out, Sylvester sneaks one of his scripts, Paradise Alley, into their secretary's pile. Impressed with the quality of his writing but finding that particular script unsuitable for production, Chartoff and Winkler encourage Sylvester to share any future writing.

When Sasha becomes pregnant, the couple find themselves in greater financial difficulties, and Sylvester is forced to sell Butkus. Drinking at a bar, he sees the Muhammad Ali vs. Chuck Wepner championship fight, and is moved by Wepner, the underdog, lasting fifteen rounds, far longer than expected. He goes home and stays up all night writing a new screenplay, Rocky. Chartoff and Winkler love the script, but bristle at Sylvester's demand to play the titular role of Rocky Balboa.

After extended attempts to buy him out with an inflated script fee, they finally persuade United Artists to approve a reduced budget and cast Sylvester as the lead, with the condition that he can be replaced if the project falls behind schedule. Low-budget director John G. Avildsen is hired, and the script's setting of New York City is changed to Philadelphia to avoid the costs of a unionized production. Sylvester uses his script fee to buy Butkus back.

Principal photography begins at a grueling schedule. Sylvester sustains injuries to his legs and hands and catches the flu, all of which complicate the filming schedule. Avildsen insists on a single take for most scenes, which Sylvester finds challenging. Chartoff and Winkler resort to raising some of their own funds to make up for an unexpected shortfall. Avildsen tells Sylvester that the film so far is "good," but not great, lacking a truly moving performance from him to tie it together. When filming Rocky's argument with his future manager Mickey Goldmill, they agree the scene as written is not working. Sylvester channels his frustrations with his father into an ad-libbed monologue, giving the film Avildsen's desired emotional climax.

Rocky completes production. Despite a small premiere in New York City, the film becomes a runaway success and wins multiple Academy Awards.

== Cast ==
- Anthony Ippolito as Sylvester Stallone, screenwriter of Rocky and the actor who plays Rocky Balboa
- AnnaSophia Robb as Sasha Czack, Sylvester's wife
- Matt Dillon as Frank Stallone Sr., Sylvester's father
- P. J. Byrne as Irwin Winkler, a producer of Rocky
- Toby Kebbell as Robert Chartoff, a producer of Rocky
- Stephan James as Carl Weathers, Sylvester's co-star playing Apollo Creed
- Tracy Letts as Sandy Maddox, a composite character of several United Artists executives
- Jay Duplass as John G. Avildsen, the director of Rocky
- Kiki Seto as Talia Shire, Sylvester's co-star playing Adrian Pennino
- Robert Morgan as Burgess Meredith, Sylvester's co-star playing Mickey Goldmill
- Saul Stein as Sal
- Trevor St. John as Grant Bader
- Erik Palladino as Pete, Sylvester's boxing coach
- Rob Demery as Joe Frazier
- Scot Teller as Burt Young, Sylvester's co-star playing Paulie Pennino
- Marla Mindelle as Carla, a pornography director
- Nikki Tyler-Flynn as Linda, Winkler and Chartoff's secretary

Canadian ice hockey executive and former Toronto Maple Leafs general manager Brian Burke also makes a non-speaking cameo appearance as a patron in the bar when Stallone watches the Ali-Wepner fight.

== Production ==
In May 2024, a biographical drama film depicting the tumultuous production of the 1976 film Rocky was announced, with Peter Farrelly directing and Peter Gamble writing the script. CAA Media Finance handled U.S sales while FilmNation Entertainment handled international at the Cannes Market 2024. In August 2025, Anthony Ippolito was cast as a young Sylvester Stallone with Amazon MGM Studios coming onboard for domestic distribution. In October 2025, Stephan James was cast as Carl Weathers, while AnnaSophia Robb and Matt Dillon were cast as Stallone's first wife Sasha Czack and his father Frank Stallone Sr.. P. J. Byrne, Toby Kebbell, Tracy Letts, Jay Duplass, Kiki Seto, Robert Morgan, Saul Stein, Trevor St. John, Erik Palladino, and Rob Demery would round out the cast later that month.

In September 2025, Stallone confirmed that he had not been contacted by anyone regarding the film, and that he only learned about its existence after reading about it, although he was still open to participating in the film's production as a consultant. However, director Peter Farrelly disputed this, saying he got Stallone's approval to make the film and advised against Stallone being involved as a producer, believing that the actor’s association with the project could lead audiences to question whether he had influenced the story.

Principal photography began on October 15, 2025, in New York City, Philadelphia, and Los Angeles, with Sean Porter serving as the cinematographer.

== Release ==
Originally scheduled for a limited theatrical release on November 13, 2026, and expanding nationwide on November 20, I Play Rocky's limited release was later moved up by a week to November 6.

The film premiered at the Toronto International Film Festival on September 12, 2026. It was presented in the Grand public section of the 21st Rome Film Festival was the Surprise Film at the 70th BFI London Film Festival in October 2026.

== Reception ==
=== Critical response ===
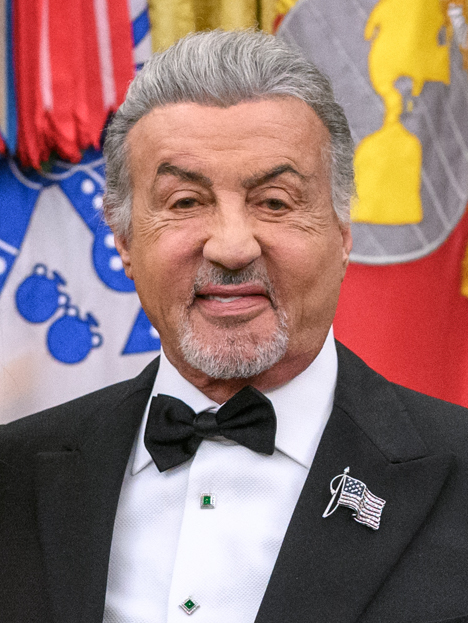
Anthony Ippolito received critical acclaim for his performance as Sylvester Stallone.

On the review aggregator website Rotten Tomatoes, 89% of 186 critics' reviews are positive, with an average rating of 7.5/10. The website's consensus reads: "A feel-good celebration of the underdog who created one of cinema's greatest underdogs, I Play Rocky may not be as powerful as the original article but packs considerable punch thanks to Anthony Ippolito's uncanny embodiment of Sly Stallone." Metacritic, which uses a weighted average, assigned the film a score of 68 out of 100, based on 46 critics, indicating "generally favorable" reviews. Audiences polled by CinemaScore gave the film a rare average grade of "A+" on an A+ to F scale.

In a positive review, Owen Gleiberman of Variety wrote, "The pleasure of I Play Rocky is that it understands the karmic way in which the story of Rocky — the underdog who triumphs against all odds — was echoed in the saga of how Stallone got the movie off the ground." Robert Daniels of ScreenDaily dismissed the film as a "walking piece of pastiche" and an "uninventive crowd pleaser", underscoring how it recreates "memorable scenes with little of the movie's original humanism".

=== Accolades ===
Award	Date of ceremony	Category	Recipient(s)	Result	Ref.
Celebration of Cinema and Television	November 16, 2026	Supporting Actor Award – Film	Stephan James	Honored	
Cinéfest Sudbury International Film Festival	September 30, 2026	Audience Choice Award	I Play Rocky	Won	
Denver Film Festival	November 3, 2026	Audience Award for Best Narrative Feature	I Play Rocky	Won	
Heartland International Film Festival	October 19, 2026	Overall Narrative Audience Choice Award	I Play Rocky (tied with Aaron Burns for Jimmy)	Won (Tied)	
SCAD Savannah Film Festival	October 29, 2026	Breakthrough Award	Anthony Ippolito	Honored	
Toronto International Film Festival	September 20, 2026	People's Choice Award	I Play Rocky	Runner-up	
Vancouver International Film Festival	October 13, 2026	Audience Award, Galas & Special Presentations	I Play Rocky	Won	
Virginia Film Festival	October 27, 2026	Audience Award for Best Narrative Feature	I Play Rocky	Won	
Windsor International Film Festival	November 18, 2026	LiUNA! People's Choice Award	I Play Rocky	Runner-up	

== See also ==
- List of boxing films
- Rocky franchise
