= Rose Stone Star =

Italian drama film

- Film poster
- Italian: Rosa pietra stella
- Directed by: Marcello Sannino
- Written by: Marcello Sannino; Giorgio Caruso; Guido Lombardi; Massimiliano Virgilio
- Starring: Ivana Lotito; Ludovica Nasti; Fabrizio Rongione; Imma Piro
- Cinematography: Alessandro Abate
- Edited by: Giogiò Franchini
- Music by: Riccardo Veno
- Production companies: Parallelo 41; Bronx Film; PFA Films
- Release date: January 2020 (IFFR)
- Country: Italy
- Language: Italian

Rose Stone Star (Italian: Rosa pietra stella) is a 2020 Italian drama film directed by Marcello Sannino. It stars Ivana Lotito, Ludovica Nasti, Fabrizio Rongione and Imma Piro. The film premiered in the Voices section of the 2020 International Film Festival Rotterdam.

== Cast ==
- Ivana Lotito as Carmela
- Ludovica Nasti as Carmela's daughter
- Fabrizio Rongione as Tarek
- Imma Piro as Carmela's mother
- Valentina Curatoli
- Francesca Bergamo
- Anna Redi
- Gigi Savoia
- Pietro Juliano
- David Power

== Production ==
In February 2019, it was announced documentary filmmaker Marcello Sannino will direct his first feature and production will take around five weeks in Portici and Naples. Parallelo 41, Bronx Film and PFA Films will produce in collaboration with Rai Cinema. The film received a contribution from the Region of Campania and is supported by the Regione Campania Film Commission in collaboration with the Municipality of Portici.
