= Se domani non torno =

2026 Italian drama film

- Promotional poster
- Italian: Se domani non torno
- Literally: If I don't come back tomorrow
- Directed by: Paola Randi
- Screenplay by: Paola Randi; Lisa Nur Sultan
- Based on: Cara Giulia by Gino Cecchettin and Marco Franzoso
- Produced by: Guglielmo Marchetti; Daniele Mazzocca
- Starring: Filippo Timi; Sabrina Martina; Tecla Bossi; Tommaso Allione
- Cinematography: Guido Michelotti
- Edited by: Andrea Maguolo
- Music by: Michele Braga
- Production company: Notorious Pictures
- Distributed by: Notorious Pictures
- Release dates: 23 October 2026 (Rome); 5 November 2026 (Theatres)
- Country: Italy
- Languages: Italian; Venetian

Se domani non torno (lit. 'If I don't come back tomorrow') is a 2026 Italian drama film directed by Paola Randi, who co-wrote the screenplay with Lisa Nur Sultan.

The film is based on the book Cara Giulia by Gino Cecchettin and Marco Franzoso, which recounts the 2023 murder of the former's daughter by her ex-boyfriend. The film's title comes from the poem by the Peruvian activist Cristina Torres Cáceres, who has since become a symbol for the fight against violence against women.

It premiered at the 21st Rome Film Festival on 23 October 2026 before its theatrical release on 5 November 2026 by Notorious Pictures.

== Synopsis ==
A regular family much like any other. The widower Gino Cecchettin and his three children: Davide, the youngest, still in high school; Elena, the eldest, studying abroad; and Giulia Cecchettin, close to finishing university. On 11 November 2023, Giulia goes missing, and their lives change completely. The family enters a nightmare they never imagined facing. This story follows a painful absence and shows how an ordinary family finds the strength to turn a private tragedy into a public call for change; so that tragedies like this never happen again.

== Cast ==
- Filippo Timi as Gino Cecchettin
- Sabrina Martina as Giulia
- Tecla Bossi as Elena, Giulia's sister
- Tommaso Allione as Davide, Giulia's brother

== Production ==
Principal photography began in February 2026 in the Veneto region of Italy.

== Release ==
Se domani non torno premiered at the 21st Rome Film Festival and at the 24th Alice nella Città Festival in Rome on 23 October 2026, three years after Giulia's murder.

The film also had preview event at the Giffoni Film Festival, an Italian children's film festival which took place in Giffoni Valle Piana, Campania from 17 to 25 July 2026.
