= Anthony Ippolito =

American actor (born 1999)

- Ippolito in 2026
- Born: Anthony Adam Ippolito; August 21, 1999 (age 27); West Islip, New York, U.S.
- Occupation: Actor
- Years active: 2006–present

Anthony Adam Ippolito (born August 21, 1999) is an American actor. He is known for his portrayals of Al Pacino in the Paramount+ miniseries The Offer (2022) and Sylvester Stallone in the biographical film I Play Rocky (2026). He also starred as George Wright in the Netflix drama series Grand Army (2020).

== Early life ==
Anthony Adam Ippolito was born on August 21, 1999, on Long Island, the only child of Anthony and Lorraine. He attended West Islip High School, and spent much of his childhood in New York City. After high school, Ippolito attended Baruch College, where he played on the baseball team. He is of Italian descent.

== Career ==
In 2022, Ippolito played Johnno in the Netflix romantic drama film Purple Hearts and Al Pacino in the Paramount+ miniseries The Offer. In 2026, he portrayed Sylvester Stallone in the biographical film I Play Rocky, directed by Peter Farrelly.

In 2026, he received the Progressive Lifetime Achievement Award at the 21st Rome Film Festival.

== Filmography ==
=== Film ===
Year	Title	Role	Notes
2006	Bella	Boy on Subway	Film debut
2010	You Have the Right to Remain Violent	Tyler Whitley	
2012	Not Fade Away	Card Table Kid	Uncredited
2013	Fool's Day	Seth	Short film
2013	The English Teacher	Blowdried Jock	
2015	Pixels	Young Sam Brenner	
2022	Purple Hearts	Johnno	
2026	I Play Rocky	Sylvester Stallone	

=== Television ===
Year	Title	Role	Notes
2015	Deadbeat	Young TJ	Episode: "The Blowfish Job"
2020	Grand Army	George Wright	Main cast (8 episodes)
2022	The Offer	Al Pacino	Recurring role (7 episodes)
