= Yesterday the Eye Didn't Sleep =

2026 film by Rakan Mayasi

- Arabic: البارح العين ما نامت
- Directed by: Rakan Mayasi
- Written by: Rakan Mayasi; Wahid Ajmi
- Produced by: Jennifer Ritter; Rakan Mayasi
- Starring: Rim Al Mawla; Jawaher Al Mawla; Yasser Al Mawla
- Cinematography: Pôl Seif
- Edited by: Louis De Schrijver
- Music by: Abed Kobeissy
- Production company: Atata
- Release date: 20 May 2026 (Cannes)
- Running time: 100 minutes
- Countries: Belgium; Lebanon; Palestine; Qatar; Saudi Arabia
- Language: Arabic

Yesterday the Eye Didn't Sleep (Arabic: البارح العين ما نامت) is a 2026 drama film directed and produced by Rakan Mayasi, in his directorial debut. A co-production of Belgium, Lebanon, Palestine, Qatar, and Saudi Arabia, it stars Rim, Jawaher Al Mawla, and Yasser Al Mawla.

The film had its world premiere in the Un Certain Regard section of the 2026 Cannes Film Festival on 20 May, where it was nominated for the Caméra d'Or.

== Premise ==
Set against the backdrop of the Lebanon–Syria border, it follows a man who accidentally kills a member of a rival clan while searching for his missing cousin, leading to his sisters being traded to preserve peace.

== Cast ==
- Rim Al Mawla as Rim
- Jawaher Al Mawla as Jawaher
- Yasser Al Mawla as Yasser

== Production ==
In an interview with IndieWire, Mayasi revealed that Yesterday the Eye Didn't Sleep was filmed without a script in March 2025 and featured the real-life Al Mawla family. He further stated that the film was inspired by his late grandmother's forced marriage. In July 2025, the project was selected to participate at the Final Cut programme, held during the Venice Film Festival. It received film music services from Oticons. In August 2025, it participated at the Work in Progress section of the Sarajevo Film Festival's CineLink Industry Days and won the Turkish National Radio Television award. It won the Special Mention of 2025 Red Sea Souk Post-Production Award and received a grant of $15,000.

== Release ==
Yesterday the Eye Didn't Sleep had its world premiere at the Un Certain Regard section of the 2026 Cannes Film Festival on 20 May, where it was nominated for the Caméra d'Or. In April 2026, Salaud Morisset acquired the film's international sales.

The film was also part of Horizons section of the 60th Karlovy Vary International Film Festival, where it was screened from 3 July to 10 July 2026.

The film will compete at the 21st Rome Film Festival in 'Progressive Cinema Competition - Visions for the World of Tomorrow' in October 2026.
