= We, Students! =

2022 Central African Republic film

- Directed by: Rafiki Fariala
- Screenplay by: Rafiki Fariala
- Produced by: Daniele Incalcaterra; Boris Lojkine; Elvis Sabin Ngaibino
- Starring: Nestor Ngbandi Ngouyou
- Cinematography: Rafiki Fariala
- Edited by: Xavier Sirven; Christian Moïse Nzengue
- Music by: Rafiki Fariala
- Production companies: Unité; Makongo Films; Kiripifilms
- Distributed by: The Party Film Sales
- Release date: 11 February 2022 (Berlin International Film Festival)
- Running time: 82 minutes
- Countries: Central African Republic; Democratic Republic of Congo; France; Saudi Arabia
- Languages: French; Sango

We, Students! (French: Nous, étudiants) is a 2022 Central African Republic documentary film written and directed by Rafiki Fariala on his feature film directorial debut. The film showcases the harsh realities on how students are brought up at the University of Bangui amid various pressing issues such as sexual harassment, terrible living conditions inside the campus and the reality of having to tolerate the rampant corrupted professors. The film captures and portrays the everyday lives of the filmmaker himself and his friends at the University of Bangui and they spare a thought about how their futures would eventually pan out in the Central African Republic in the future. The film was screened in the Panorama section at the 72nd Berlin International Film Festival and it became the first film ever from the Central African Republic to premiere at the Berlin International Film Festival. According to The Africa Report, it was ranked among top ten most notable African films of 2022.

== Cast ==
- Rafiki Fariala as himself
- Nestor Ngbandi Ngouyou
- Aaron Koyasoukpengo
- Benjamin Kongo Sombot
- Rafiki Fariala
