= Rafiki Fariala =

Congolese film director (born 1997)

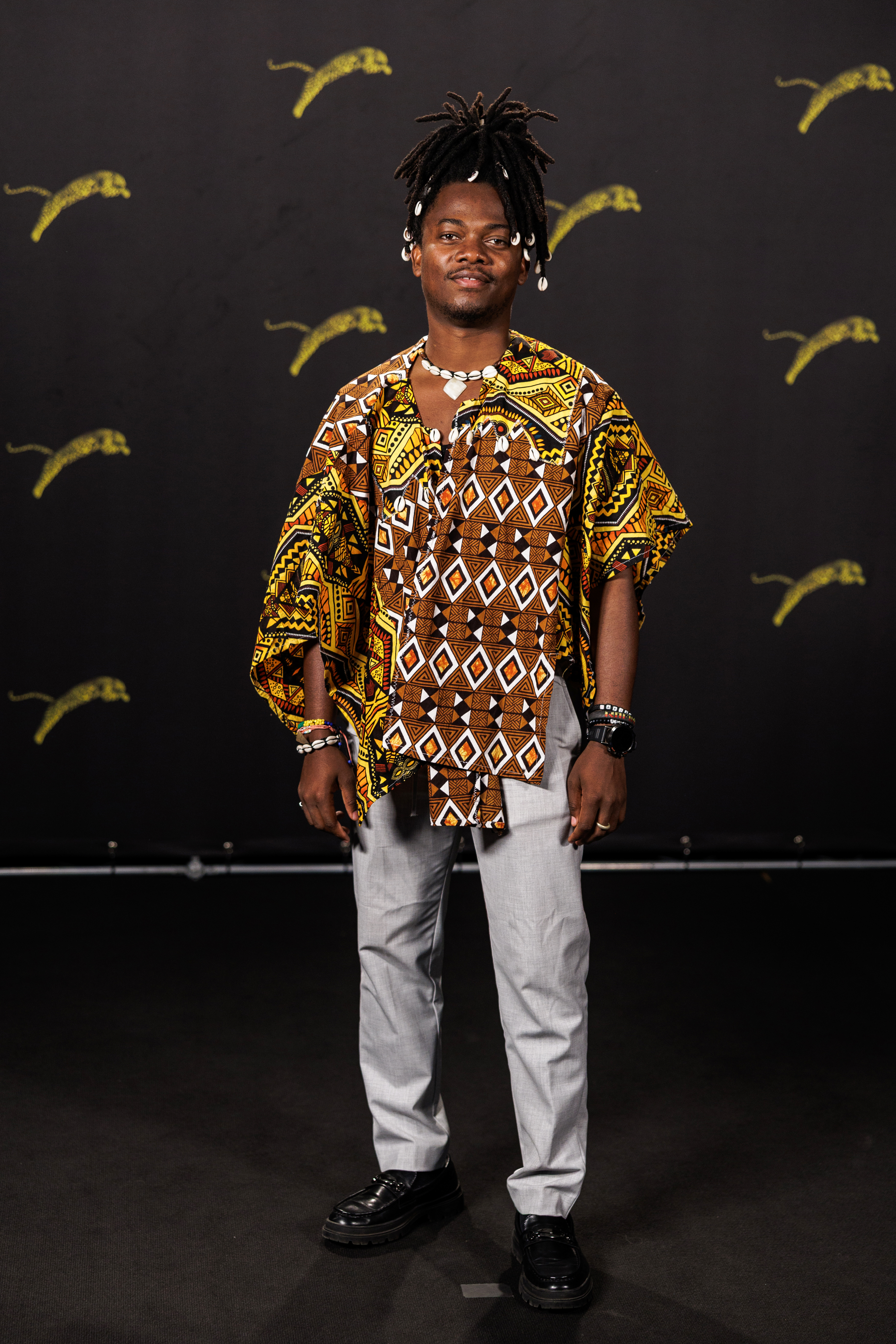
- Born: 1997 (age 28–29); Uvira, Democratic Republic of the Congo

Rafiki Fariala (born 1997) is a Congolese film director.

== Early life ==
Fariala was born in 1997 in Uvira. As a child, his family fled to Central African Republic during the Second Congo War.

== Career ==
In 2017, Fariala participated in the Varan documentary workshop in Bangui, releasing his debut short Mbi Na Mo the following year. His feature film debut, the 2022 documentary We, Students! about a group of friends at the University of Bangui, premiered at the 72nd Berlin International Film Festival.

Fariala's musical film Congo Boy premiered in the Un Certain Regard section of the 2026 Cannes Film Festival.

== Filmography ==
Year	Title	Notes
2018	Mbi Na Mo	Short film
2022	We, Students!	—N/a
2026	Congo Boy	—N/a

== Awards and nominations ==
Year	Award	Category	Nominated work	Result	Ref.
2022	Cinéma du Réel	Libraries Award	We, Students!	Won	
2022	Hainan International Film Festival	Best Documentary	We, Students!	Won	
2026	Cannes Film Festival	Un Certain Regard	Congo Boy	Nominated	
