= Parco della Musica =

Public music complex in Rome, Italy

Coordinates: 41.929075°N 12.474557°E

Auditorium Parco della Musica
- View of terrace outside the venue (c.2016)
- Interactive map of Auditorium Parco della Musica
- Address: Via Pietro de Coubertin, 30; 00196 Rome, Italy
- Location: Flaminio
- Owner: Comune di Roma
- Capacity: 2,744 (Santa Cecilia hall); 2,707 (Outdoor theater); 1,133 (Sinopoli hall); 661 (Petrassi hall); 304 (Studio Borgna theater)

Construction
- Groundbreaking: 15 January 1995
- Opened: 21 April 2002
- Architect: RPBW Architects
- Structural engineers: Studio Vitone & Associati
- Services engineer: Manens Intertecnica
- General contractor: Techint

Website
- Venue Website
- Building details

General information
- Inaugurated: 21 December 2002

Design and construction
- Developer: Drees & Sommer
- Other designers: Franco Zagari; Tecnocamere; Müller-BBM
- Quantity surveyor: Davis Langdon

Auditorium Parco della Musica is a public music complex in Rome, Italy, with three concert halls and an outdoor theater in a park setting. It was designed by Italian architect Renzo Piano. Jürgen Reinhold of Müller-BBM was in charge of acoustics for the halls; Franco Zagari was landscape architect for the outdoor spaces. Parco della Musica lies with the Foro Italico in the north area of Rome's ancient center, and is home to most of the facilities of the Accademia Nazionale di Santa Cecilia.

The halls are: Sala Santa Cecilia, with about 2800 seats; Sala Sinopoli, in memory of conductor Giuseppe Sinopoli, seating about 1200 people; and Sala Petrassi, in memory of Goffredo Petrassi, with 700 seats. Structurally separated for sound-proofing, they are nonetheless joined at the base by a continuous lobby. Their outer architectural form has led to nicknames such as “the blobs,” “the beetles,” “the turtles” and “the computer mouses”.) The outdoor theater, called the Cavea, recalls ancient Greek or Roman performance spaces and is fan-shaped around a central piazza.

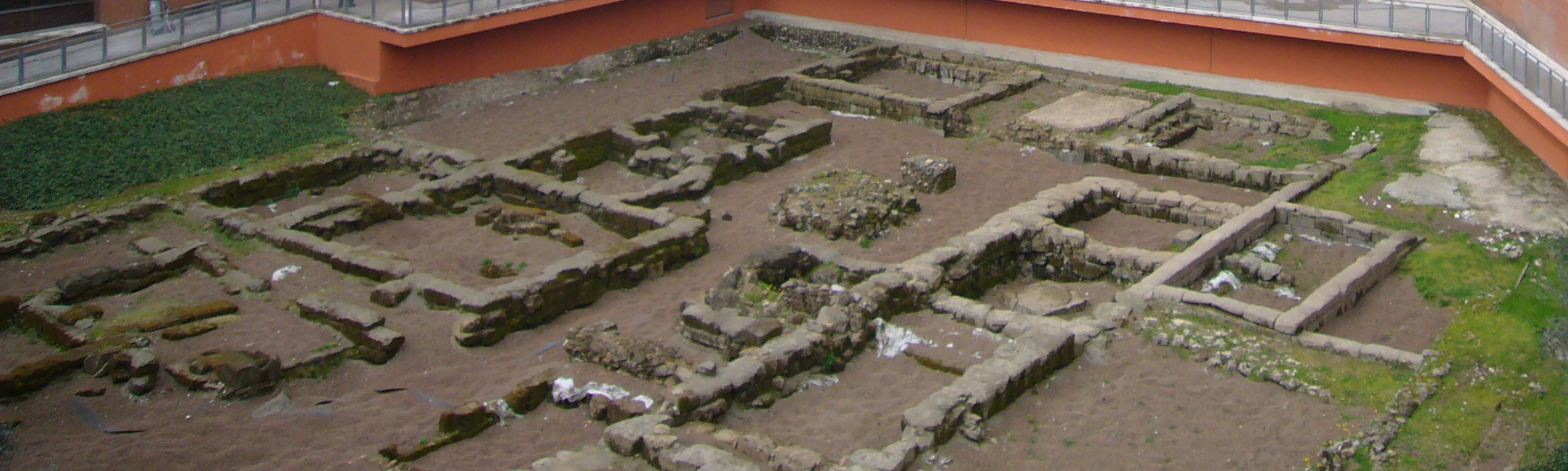
The ruins of a Roman villa inside the park

During construction, excavations uncovered the foundations of a villa and an oil-press dating from the sixth century BC. Renzo Piano then adjusted his design scheme to accommodate the archaeological remains and included a small museum to house artifacts discovered, delaying the project's completion by a year. Parco della Musica was inaugurated on 21 December 2002. Within a few years it became Europe's most-visited music facility. In 2014, it had over two million visitors, making it the second-most-visited cultural music venue in the world, after Lincoln Center in New York.

== Gallery ==
Sala Santa Cecilia.

Sala Sinopoli.

Sala Petrassi.

Panoramic view of Parco Della Musica.
