= Rakan Mayasi =

Palestinian filmmaker

- Rakan Mayasi in 2026
- Born: Berlin, Germany
- Occupation: Filmmaker
- Notable work: Trumpets in the Sky, The Key, Yesterday the Eye Didn't Sleep

Rakan Mayasi is a Palestinian filmmaker. He is best known for his short films Roubama, Bonbone, The Key, and Trumpets in the Sky and his feature film,Yesterday the Eye Didn't Sleep (2026).

== Early life and education ==
Mayasi was born in Berlin to Palestinian parents who were born in Haifa. Mayasi grew up in Jordan. He studied at the LUCA School of Arts in Belgium, the Lebanese American University, graduating in 2007 and the Busan Asian Film School where he took a workshop led by Abbas Kiarostami.

== Career ==
=== Short films ===
Mayasi has made five short films, including Sea Sonata in 2010, Roubama in 2012, Bonboné in 2017, Trumpets in the Sky in 2021, and The Key in 2024.

Bonboné was awarded the golden egg in 2018 at the Küstendorf International Film and Music Festival. Haaretz said the film, which "follows a Palestinian woman... and her efforts to smuggle [her husband's] sperm out of prison... paints a picture of love and all the hardships that accompany it... [w]ith a healthy dose of dark humor".

In 2021,Trumpets in the Sky got an honourable mention for the Toronto International Film Festival Award for Best International Short Film.

The Key was based on a short story by Anwar Hamed and received a special mention from the jury of the 2024 Al Ard Film Festival.

=== Feature films ===
Mayasi made his directorial debut with the 2026 film Yesterday the Eye Didn't Sleep. The film had its world premiere at the Un Certain Regard section of the 2026 Cannes Film Festival on 20 May 2026, where it was nominated for the Caméra d'Or. The movie was filmed without a script and inspired by his grandmother's forced marriage.

== Critical reception ==
Of his short film, Bonboné, Short of the Week said, "the film subverts expectations... Steering clear of stereotypes and not shying away from the fantasy and eroticism... Mayasi sprinkles the storyline of Bonboné with hints of humour to lighten the mood. This gentle touch of comedy allows the audience to focus... Though humor is vital in the film’s success, Mayasi finds just the right balance to inject social commentary into his story."

Middle East Eye said of the short The Key, "For Mayasi, genre-storytelling gave him substantial freedom to tackle the subject in a fashion that is worlds apart from the direct and accustomed treatments of the Nakba."

Of his film, Yesterday the Eye Didn't Sleep, Variety described it as genuinely genre-free and called it: "A tone poem and an observational, fly-on-the-wall yarn more interested in the specificity of mood and atmosphere than story, the film takes viewers inside the traditions and patriarchal rituals of the Bedouin tribes in Lebanon’s Bekaa Valley." Screen Daily for its part said "The use of non-professional actors and the absence of a conventional script underscore the film’s hybrid identity as part documentary, part autofiction... The film’s standout aspect is [the] images: landscape shots of the Bekaa Valley and surrounding mountains dwarf the protagonists, reinforcing the sense of powerlessness experienced by the central characters." Cineuropa considered the "film was shot... with a sense of urgency that is palpable in the film’s themes and the conflicts underpinning the narrative... Yet the film’s form seeks out and cherishes moments of pause, focusing on everyday gestures and the vastness of the landscapes, the impassive backdrop to these modern tragedies.... Rakan Mayasi composes his shots like paintings, multiplying frames within frames, depicting boundaries and obstacles, right up to the final scene." RogerEbert.com said "Palestinian filmmaker Rakan Mayasi’s lyrical debut feature... explores what forms of agency remain accessible to women navigating life within larger structures that systematically deprive them of their voices.... That Mayasi studied under Abbas Kiarostami is evidenced by this film’s poetic, neo-realist style".

== Awards and honours ==
- The short film, Bonboné, was awarded the golden egg in 2018 at the Küstendorf International Film and Music Festival and received Best Short Film award at the 2018 Moscow International Film Festival.
- The short Trumpets in the Sky received an honourable mention at the 2021 Toronto International Film Festival for Best International Short Film.
- The short The Key got a special mention from the jury of the 2024 Al Ard Film Festival.
- The 2026 feature film Yesterday the Eye Didn't Sleep premiered at the Un Certain Regard section of the 2026 Cannes Film Festival and was nominated for the Caméra d'Or.
