= Paola Randi =

Italian film director (born 1970)

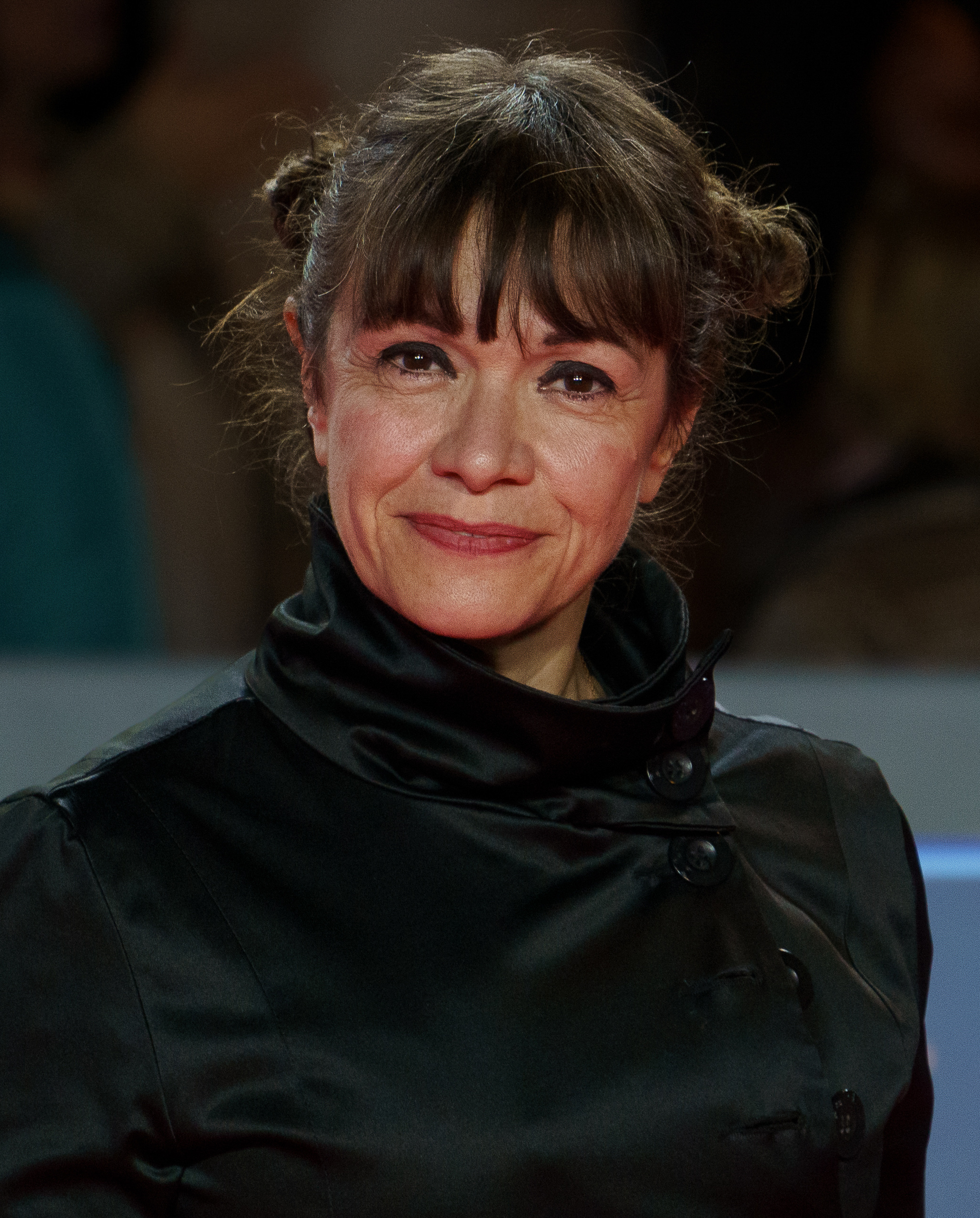
- Randi in 2025
- Born: 21 March 1970 (age 56); Milan, Italy
- Occupations: Screenwriter; film director

Paola Randi (Italian pronunciation: [ˈpaːola ˈrandi]; born 21 March 1970) is an Italian film director and screenwriter.

== Life and career ==
Born in Milan, Randi graduated in law while attending courses in singing, acting, mime, painting, drawing, and engraving techniques. She worked in several international non-profit women's organisations and in a communications company, and co-founded and directed the theatre and art magazine TTR.

Randi entered the cinema industry in 2003, serving as assistant director for The Spectator. After writing and directing animation and stop motion projects, music videos and short films, in 2010 she made her feature directorial debut with Into Paradiso. The film premiered at the 67th edition of the Venice Film Festival, and got her a David di Donatello nomination for best new director. After directing a segment of the anthology film 9x10 novanta, her second feature Little Tito and the Aliens got her a Nastro d'Argento for best script. Her 2024 film The Story of Frank and Nina premiered at the 81st Venice International Film Festival in the Orizzonti Extra sidebar.

Randi is also active on television, where she directed several episodes of Zero and Luna Nera.

== Filmography ==
=== Films ===
- Into Paradiso (2010)
- 9x10 novanta (2014, segment Progetto panico)
- Little Tito and the Aliens (2018)
- The Legend of the Christmas Witch 2: The Origins (2021)
- Beata te (2022)
- The Story of Frank and Nina (2024)
- Se domani non torno (2026)

=== Television ===
- Luna Nera (2020, 2 episodes)
- Zero (2021, 2 episodes)
