= Drees & Sommer =

Germany-based consulting company

Drees & Sommer AG
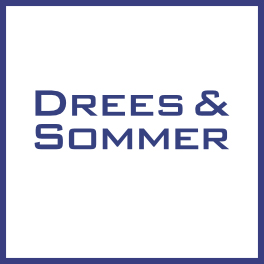
- Company type: Societas Europaea
- Industry: Real Estate Industry
- Founded: 1970
- Headquarters: Stuttgart-Vaihingen, Germany
- Key people: Dierk Mutschler, Marc Schömbs, Steffen Szeidl (Board members); Johannes Fritz (Chairman of the Supervisory Board)
- Revenue: 900 M EUR (2023) 964 M EUR (2024)
- Number of employees: > 6.000 (2023)
- Website: www.dreso.com

Drees & Sommer is an international consulting firm for the construction and real estate sector headquartered in Germany. The company's main services are development and process consulting, infrastructure consulting, project management and engineering as well as real estate consulting. Building construction and infrastructure projects of all types and sizes are supported for almost all sectors, from the initial idea through planning and implementation to operation and possible revitalization.

== Profil ==
Business areas include green building, green development, optimization of existing buildings and cradle to cradle, ranging from consulting and project management to certification and international green building labels. Another focus of its services is the professional handling of complex large-scale projects with the support of methods such as Building Information Modeling and Lean Construction Management. The company has managed major projects such as Potsdamer Platz in Berlin, Messe Stuttgart and Building 1 of the F. Hoffmann-La Roche pharmaceutical group in Basel, which was completed in 2015.

== Company structure ==
The company is a partner-managed European stock corporation (Societas Europaea, SE). All shares are held by active or former managers who have made a special contribution to the success of the company. This makes the company independent of third parties. The individual locations are organized as independent operating units under the umbrella of Drees & Sommer SE. The management board is made up of three active partners.

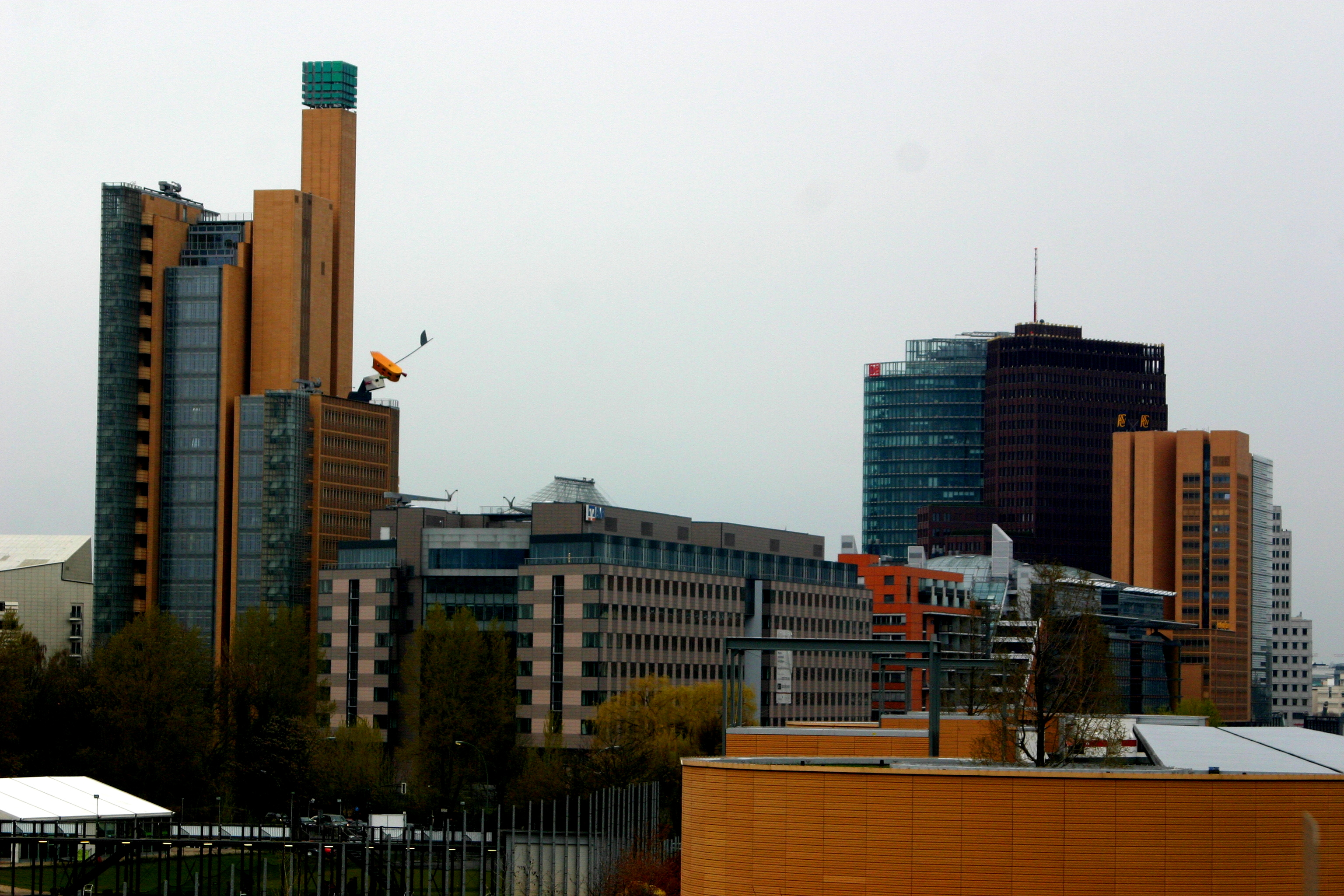
Potsdamer Platz

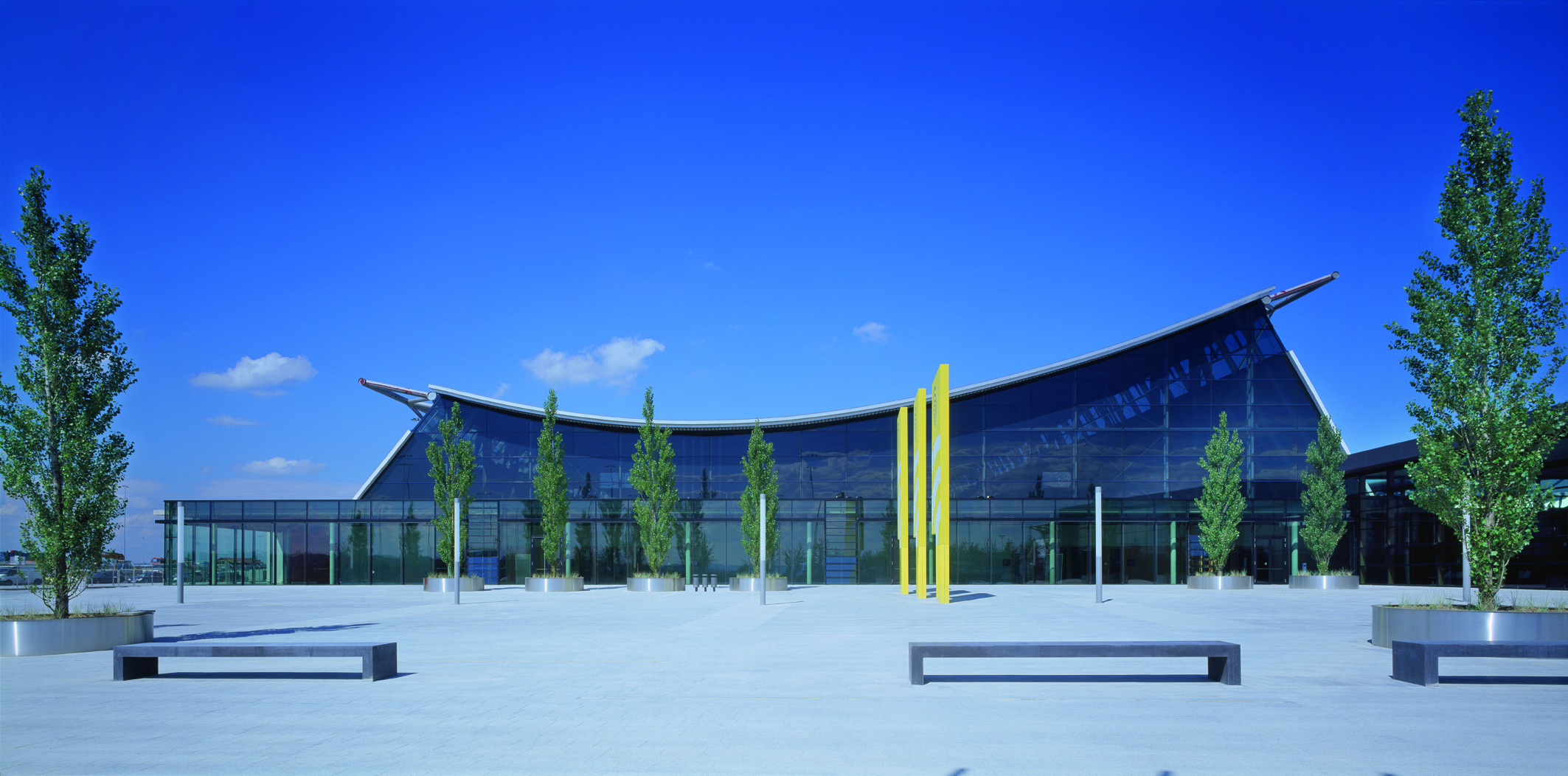
Stuttgart Trade Fair Center

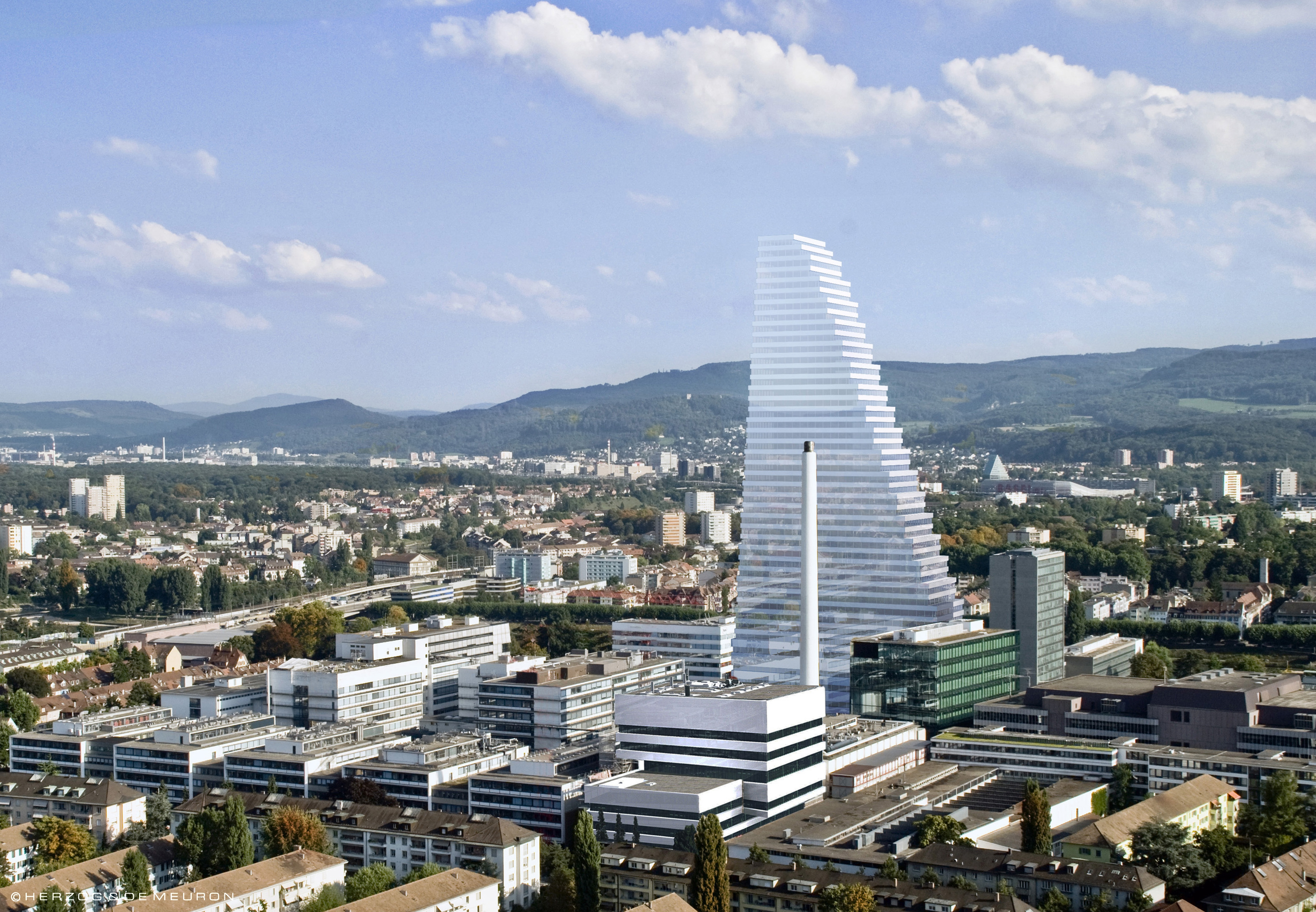
Bau 1, Hoffmann-La Roche

== History ==
In 1970, Gerhard Drees, professor at the University of Stuttgart, and Volker Kuhne founded the engineering office Drees, Kuhne u. Partner in Stuttgart, which specialized in network technology, production planning, operational organization and construction consulting. Hans Sommer became a partner in 1973, and the office soon took on the name Drees & Sommer. Over the years, both the number of employees and the number of locations grew continuously. At the beginning of the 1980s, the company organized itself into a partner model in order to accommodate the constantly growing number of employees and locations. Individual companies were founded that were responsible for a certain number of employees and organized independently.

Drees & Sommer Aktiengesellschaft was founded in 1991. The individual companies are now united under one roof. Company co-founder Gerhard Drees became chairman of the supervisory board, Hans Sommer Chairman of the executive board. In 2017, Drees & Sommer AG was converted into an SE.

The company was initially entrusted with the project management of Stuttgart 21, for which it also prepared the feasibility study and handled the preliminary project. From 1996, it held a 10 percent stake in the project company DBProjekt GmbH Stuttgart 21. The stake was sold on August 1, 2001.

Dr. Johannes Fritz has been chairman of the supervisory board since the beginning of 2023, replacing Hans Sommer. The company is managed by the partners, who are also the owners of the company. In 2020, the company celebrated its 50th anniversary. Dierk Mutschler, Steffen Szeidl and Marc Schömbs form the management board from among the partners.
