= Mars Verrone =

American producer

- Occupation: Producer
- Years active: 2023–present

Mars Verrone is an American filmmaker and musician. They have produced Union (2024) and Who Moves America (2026), and directed the short film Buckskin (2026).

== Early life ==
Verrone graduated from Brown University, magna cum laude with honors in Modern Culture and Media (Production).

== Career ==
In 2024, Verrone produced Union directed by Brett Story and Stephen T. Maing, which follows the Amazon Labor Union, as they seek to unionize Amazon's JFK8 Warehouse in Staten Island. It had its world premiere at the 2024 Sundance Film Festival, where it won the U.S. Documentary Special Jury Award for the Art of Change. It was theatrically released in October 2024, and broadcast on POV. Verrone received a Cinema Eye Honors award for Outstanding Achievement in Production. The film was shortlisted for the Academy Award for Best Documentary Feature at the 97th Academy Awards. and was nominated for Best Documentary at the 47th News and Documentary Emmy Awards.

In 2026, Verrone, directed, produced, composed, and edited, the short film Buckskin which focuses on their grandfather, Carroll B. Williams Jr., which had its world premiere at the True/False Film Festival. It is distributed by Lunette Films. That same year, Verrone produced Who Moves America directed by Yael Bridge, which also premiered at the True/False Film Festival, and was theatrically released in September 2026.

== Filmography ==
=== Producer ===
Year	Title	Director
2024	Union	Brett Story & Stephen T. Maing
2026	Who Moves America	Yael Bridge
