= Grand Jury Prize Dramatic =

Film award

This is the list of the winners of the Sundance Grand Jury Prize for dramatic features.

== Winners ==
| Year | Winner | Director(s) | Ref. |
|---|---|---|---|
| 1978 | Girlfriends | Claudia Weill | |
| 1978 | The Whole Shootin' Match (second place) | Eagle Pennell | |
| 1982 | Circle of Power | Bobby Roth | |
| 1983 | Purple Haze | David Burton Morris | |
| 1984 | Old Enough | Marisa Silver | |
| 1985 | Blood Simple | Joel Coen | |
| 1986 | Smooth Talk | Joyce Chopra | |
| 1987 | The Trouble with Dick | Gary Walkow | |
| 1987 | Waiting for the Moon | Jill Godmilow | |
| 1988 | Heat and Sunlight | Rob Nilsson | |
| 1989 | True Love | Nancy Savoca | |
| 1990 | Chameleon Street | Wendell B. Harris Jr. | |
| 1991 | Poison | Todd Haynes | |
| 1992 | In the Soup | Alexandre Rockwell | |
| 1993 | Public Access | Bryan Singer | |
| 1993 | Ruby in Paradise | Victor Nuñez | |
| 1994 | What Happened Was... | Tom Noonan | |
| 1995 | The Brothers McMullen | Edward Burns | |
| 1995 | The Young Poisoner's Handbook | Benjamin Ross | |
| 1996 | Welcome to the Dollhouse | Todd Solondz | |
| 1997 | Sunday | Jonathan Nossiter | |
| 1998 | Slam | Marc Levin | |
| 1999 | Three Seasons | Tony Bui | |
| 2000 | Girlfight | Karyn Kusama | |
| 2000 | You Can Count on Me | Kenneth Lonergan | |
| 2001 | The Believer | Henry Bean | |
| 2002 | Personal Velocity | Rebecca Miller | |
| 2003 | American Splendor | Shari Springer Berman and Robert Pulcini | |
| 2004 | Primer | Shane Carruth | |
| 2005 | Forty Shades of Blue | Ira Sachs | |
| 2006 | Quinceañera | Richard Glatzer | |
| 2007 | Padre Nuestro | Christopher Zalla | |
| 2008 | Frozen River | Courtney Hunt | |
| 2009 | Precious: Based on the Novel "Push" by Sapphire | Lee Daniels | |
| 2010 | Winter's Bone | Debra Granik | |
| 2011 | Like Crazy | Drake Doremus | |
| 2012 | Beasts of the Southern Wild | Benh Zeitlin | |
| 2013 | Fruitvale Station | Ryan Coogler | |
| 2014 | Whiplash | Damien Chazelle | |
| 2015 | Me and Earl and the Dying Girl | Alfonso Gomez-Rejon | |
| 2016 | The Birth of a Nation | Nate Parker | |
| 2017 | I Don't Feel at Home in This World Anymore | Macon Blair | |
| 2018 | The Miseducation of Cameron Post | Desiree Akhavan | |
| 2019 | Clemency | Chinonye Chukwu | |
| 2020 | Minari | Lee Isaac Chung | |
| 2021 | CODA | Sian Heder | |
| 2022 | Nanny | Nikyatu Jusu | |
| 2023 | A Thousand and One | A.V. Rockwell | |
| 2024 | In the Summers | Alessandra Lacorazza Samudio | |
| 2025 | Atropia | Hailey Gates | |
| 2026 | Josephine | Beth de Araújo | |

== International winners ==
- 2005: The Hero
- 2006: 13 Tzameti
- 2007: Sweet Mud
- 2008: The King of Ping Pong
- 2009: The Maid
- 2010: Animal Kingdom
- 2011: Happy, Happy
- 2012: Violeta Went to Heaven
- 2013: Jiseul
- 2014: To Kill a Man
- 2015: Slow West
- 2016: Sand Storm
- 2017: The Nile Hilton Incident
- 2018: Butterflies
- 2019: The Souvenir
- 2020: Yalda, a Night for Forgiveness
- 2021: Hive
- 2022: Utama
- 2023: Scrapper
- 2024: Sujo
- 2025: Cactus Pears
- 2026: Shame and Money

== See also ==
- Palme d'Or
- Academy Award for Best Picture
