= ISFA =

ISFA may refer to:

- Independent Schools Foundation Academy
- Independent Schools Football Association
- Intercollegiate Soccer Football Association
- International String Figure Association
- International Shootfighting Association
- Iranian Short Film Academy awards
