= The Legend of Ochi (soundtrack) =

The Legend of Ochi (Original Motion Picture Soundtrack)

Film score by David Longstreth
- Released: April 25, 2025
- Recorded: 2023–2025
- Genre: Film score
- Length: 69:29
- Label: A24 Music
- Producer: David Longstreth

David Longstreth chronology
Love Me (2025)	The Legend of Ochi (2025)

The Legend of Ochi (Original Motion Picture Soundtrack) is the film score to the 2025 fantasy adventure film The Legend of Ochi directed by Isaiah Saxon starring Helena Zengel, Finn Wolfhard, Emily Watson and Willem Dafoe. The soundtrack featured 32 tracks composed by singer-songwriter David Longstreth and released through A24 Music on April 25, 2025.

== Development ==
In November 2021, it was announced that singer-songwriter David Longstreth of the band Dirty Projectors would compose the film score. It was initially intended to be his debut film, though the other film he signed Love Me (2025) released first. He befriended Saxon during the film's conceptualization, when the latter was a fan of his work and brought him as the first person to be involved in the project. Saxon wanted to integrate diegetic music in a grounded way and on-camera, as with the cast members and animals performing musical acts. By the time the film was greenlit, there was a lot of on-camera music which resulted in Longstreth writing most of the themes even before filming. Even before watching the final edit, Longstreth generated enormous amounts of material, motifs and compositions based on his ideas from the screenplay, while also working on MIDI sketches which he could edit to. As much of the material has been generated, Saxon felt there was no need to use temp tracks which would have made him much difficult to work.

During the discussions regarding its music, Saxon and Longstreth recalled on the works of Olivier Messiaen, Krzysztof Penderecki, Gérard Grisey and Jonny Greenwood, but when the editing happened, they discussed on John Williams' works on E.T. the Extra-Terrestrial (1982) and Jurassic Park (1993). Saxon recalled on the working style of Greenwood and Paul Thomas Anderson, and how the former responded to Anderson's handling of scenes through his music, citing a synchronized relationship between the director and composer and noted on how Saxon supervised Longstreth's music through in-person and virtual Zoom sessions. Once the process has been done, Longstreth would finalize those compositions and had commit to a complete score. Later, the team brought a complete symphonic orchestra consisting of harp, choir, whistle, and pan flutes. The recording of the score continued for around two years, with Saxon noting it as a tremendous contribution to the film comparing it to Fantasia (1940) as the "power of music and pictures together".

Though Saxon was not musically inclined, he recalled on his wife Meara O'Reilly's album Hockets for Two Voices (2021) being written the same time as the film's script and the album served as a metaphor for expressing a musical animal language. This also influenced the climactic sequence of the exaltation between humans and animals, which he turned to create that part. The Ochi song was performed by throat whistler Paul Manalatos, with a hocketed arrangement by O'Reilly was harmonized with Longstreth's symphonic orchestral score. Manalatos was brought during post-production at Longstreth's studio and recorded it at the booth, where he was tasked to improvise every detail and emotional inflection of each beat of Ochi's whistling. Saxon then edited and merged a bit with samples of mockingbird, raven and whale for the adult Ochi. A song "Through the Long and Lonely Night" was also recorded for the film by Dirty Projectors and was also featured in the album as well.

== Release ==
The soundtrack was announced on April 10, 2025, and preceded by the singles: "Prelude", "The River" and "The Pond". The album was released through A24 Music on April 25, 2025.

== Track listing ==
No.	Title	Length
1.	"Prelude"	3:36
2.	"The Library"	0:32
3.	"The Hunt"	3:27
4.	"Yuri Walks Across Town"	1:08
5.	"The Barn"	1:42
6.	"Checking the Traps"	4:10
7.	"You're Not Like They Say"	5:19
8.	"Please Feed My Caterpillars"	1:42
9.	"I Am Strong and Cool"	1:14
10.	"The Dawn of Yuri's Quest"	1:12
11.	"Kurkamart"	1:03
12.	"Get Out of My Car"	0:40
13.	"Petro on Horseback"	0:41
14.	"The Pond"	2:16
15.	"I Can Talk to You!"	1:06
16.	"Wood Block Ceremony"	0:59
17.	"Maxim Closing In"	1:33
18.	"Joy, Pain, Excitement, Fear"	2:48
19.	"The Showdown"	2:24
20.	"Yuri and Young Ochi Reunion"	1:47
21.	"Campfire"	1:46
22.	"Boy Whistles"	1:14
23.	"The River"	2:37
24.	"Action at the River"	1:26
25.	"Cavemouth"	2:07
26.	"The Caves"	2:24
27.	"Use My Axe"	4:24
28.	"The Shrine (Introduction)"	2:47
29.	"Ochisong Exaltation"	1:53
30.	"The Shrine (Finale)"	3:09
31.	"End Credits"	1:50
32.	"Through the Long and Lonely Night (The Legend of Ochi)" (Dirty Projectors and David Longstreth)	4:33
Total length:		69:29

== Reception ==
Carlos Aguilar of Variety wrote "Intertwined with the Ochi noises is David Longstreth's transfixing score, which rings so brightly ethereal as if truly comprised from sounds captured in the forest. It'll be one of the most unforgettable scores for a movie this year." David Ehrlich of IndieWire noted that the "airy Carpathian luster of David Longstreth's score" brings a "sensoral richness". Tim Grierson of Screen International wrote "David Longstreth's score, which incorporates flutes and strings, means to conjure up memories of bygone fantasy family films". Marshall Shaffer of Slant Magazine wrote "The film invokes a consistent sense of wonder and awe through the sweep of a fantasy, captured most noticeably in David Longstreth's soaring, John Williams-esque score."

Pete Hammond of Deadline Hollywood wrote "David Longstreth's impressive score is highlighted by a recurring haunting theme balanced by a more classical approach usually found in these kinds of tales. Think John Williams." Maegan Navarro of Bloody Disgusting wrote "David Longstreth's impressive score [does] the heavy lifting [here]." Anna Miller of Collider wrote "the film boasts a remarkable score — the first feature film score by songwriter/composer David Longstreth." Lindsey Bahr of Datebook called it a "fanciful score".

== Release history ==
Release history and formats for The Legend of Ochi (Original Motion Picture Soundtrack)
Region	Date	Format(s)	Label(s)	Ref.
Various	April 25, 2025	Digital download; streaming	A24 Music	
Various	July 25, 2025	LP	A24 Music	
