= Shuchi Talati =

Indian film director

- Born: 1984 (age 41–42)
- Known for: Girls Will Be Girls (2024)
- Website: shuchitalati.com

Shuchi Talati is an Indian film director. She won the Audience Award for Dramatic World Cinema at the 2024 Sundance Film Festival for her film Girls Will Be Girls.

She studied at the American Film Institute, and served as Creative Head for Indusgeeks.

== Early life ==
Talati pursued Bachelors of Arts in English from St. Xaviers College, Mumbai and a post-graduate diploma in Social Communications Media from Sophia College, Mumbai. She then went on to pursue MFA in Film Directing from American Film Institute in Los Angeles.

== Career ==
Talati's short film, Mae & Ash (2012), was inspired from her personal experience in Bombay, where her boyfriend's ex-girlfriend stayed with him for a week, leading to feelings of insecurity. She translated her experience into the story of Mae & Ash.

Talati produced the short Execution (2020), which won a special jury mention at the New Orleans Film Festival, and Honolulu (2023) by Maya Tanaka, and was the story producer for the documentary Being Mary Tyler Moore (2023).

Apart from her narrative work, Talati has contributed to Netflix's We Are: The Brooklyn Saints (2021) and HBO's Wyatt Cenac's Problem Areas (2018), where her episode earned a GLAAD award nomination for its exploration of racist policing.

She directed the short A Period Piece (2021), which premiered at SXSW 2020, and wrote and directed the film Girls Will Be Girls (2024), which received generally positive reviews. Girls will be Girls won an Audience Award at the 2024 Sundance Film Festival, and its lead actor Preeti Panigrahi won a Special Jury Award for Acting for her performance.

== Selected filmography ==
- Mae and Ash (2012)
- A Period Piece (2020) - premiered at SXSW 2020
- Girls Will Be Girls (2024)

== Awards and recognition ==
- Bridges-Larson Production award
- Girls Will Be Girls (2024 film) - World Cinema Dramatic (Audience), 2024 Sundance Film Festival
