= Cover-Up (2025 film) =

2025 American documentary film

Cover Up
- Release poster
- Directed by: Laura Poitras; Mark Obenhaus
- Produced by: Laura Poitras; Mark Obenhaus; Yoni Golijov; Olivia Streisand
- Starring: Seymour Hersh
- Cinematography: Mia Cioffi Henry
- Edited by: Laura Poitras; Peter Bowman; Amy Foote
- Music by: Maya Shenfeld
- Production companies: Praxis Films; Project Mockingbird; Plan B Entertainment
- Distributed by: Netflix
- Release dates: August 29, 2025 (Venice); December 19, 2025 (United States); December 26, 2025 (Netflix)
- Running time: 118 minutes
- Country: United States
- Languages: English; Vietnamese; Arabic

Cover-Up is a 2025 American documentary film produced and directed by Laura Poitras and Mark Obenhaus. It explores the investigative journalism career of Seymour Hersh, a Pulitzer Prize-winning journalist who covered the My Lai massacre during the Vietnam War and the Abu Ghraib torture scandal during the Iraq War, both committed by the U.S. Army.

The film premiered out of competition at the 82nd Venice International Film Festival on August 29, 2025. It had a limited theatrical release in the U.S. on December 19 and began streaming globally on Netflix on December 26. It received widespread praise from critics.

== Premise ==
American journalist Seymour Hersh reluctantly agrees to discuss his career, providing unprecedented access to his body of work. The film follows the exposure of U.S. war crimes during the Vietnam War and the secret U.S. bombing of Cambodia; the Watergate scandal; the CIA's program of domestic spying; and the torture and abuse of prisoners at Abu Ghraib during the U.S. war on terror. It incorporates archival audio recordings, including White House tapes of Richard Nixon discussing Hersh with Henry Kissinger.

== Production ==
In 2004, Laura Poitras had the idea of making a documentary film following Seymour Hersh in real time as he met sources or in meetings at The New Yorker. Hersh opposed the idea as it would be risky for sources and he did not want to talk about himself. But Poitras and Hersh remained in touch. After finishing All the Beauty and the Bloodshed, Poitras reached out to Hersh, who suggested she speak to Mark Obenhaus, as Obenhaus and Hersh wanted to enter production on a film about Hersh's reporting on the My Lai massacre, which struggled to find financing. Poitras and Obenhaus decided to collaborate, with Hersh allowing Obenhaus and Poitras, alongside archival producers, access to his archive, which had over 7,000 assets. Obenhaus, Poitras, and producer Olivia Streisand spent three months creating a proof-of-concept for the film and figuring out how to work together. All The President's Men and The Parallax View were among inspirations for the film's tone. The documentary also addresses controversies in Hersh's career, including his 1997 book The Dark Side of Camelot, from which he removed a chapter based on letters later revealed to be forgeries.

== Release ==
The film had its world premiere out of competition at the 82nd Venice International Film Festival on August 29, 2025. It screened at the 52nd Telluride Film Festival on August 30 and at the 2025 Toronto International Film Festival on September 10. It also screened at the main slate of the 2025 New York Film Festival. It competed in the Stockholm Documentary Competition of the 2025 Stockholm International Film Festival on November 5, 2025. It screened at AFI Fest on October 22. On November 17, it was the closing film at Glimmerglass Film Days in Cooperstown, New York.

In September 2025, Netflix acquired distribution rights to the film, planning a winter release. It was theatrically released in the U.S. on December 19 and had a global streaming release on December 26.

== Reception ==
On the review aggregator website Rotten Tomatoes, 98% of 61 critics' reviews are positive, with an average rating of 8.5/10. The website's consensus reads: "Cover-Up shines a light on Seymour Hersh's remarkable career and the pugnacious commitment it required, making for an absorbing and instructive treatise on journalistic responsibility." Metacritic, which uses a weighted average, assigned the film a score of 86 out of 100, based on 19 critics, indicating "universal acclaim".

=== Accolades ===
| Award / Film Festival | Date of ceremony | Category | Recipient(s) | Result | Ref. |
|---|---|---|---|---|---|
| Critics' Choice Documentary Awards | November 9, 2025 | Best Documentary Feature | Cover-up | Nominated | |
| Critics' Choice Documentary Awards | November 9, 2025 | Best Historical Documentary | Cover-up | Nominated | |
| Stockholm International Film Festival | November 14, 2025 | Best Documentary | Cover-up | Nominated | |
| Cinema Eye Honors | January 8, 2026 | Outstanding Non-Fiction Feature | Laura Poitras, Mark Obenhaus, Yoni Golijov, Olivia Streisand, Mia Cioffi Henry, Amy Foote, Peter Bowman, Maya Shenfeld, and Seymour Hersh | Nominated | |
| Cinema Eye Honors | January 8, 2026 | Outstanding Direction | Laura Poitras and Mark Obenhaus | Nominated | |
| Cinema Eye Honors | January 8, 2026 | Outstanding Editing | Amy Foote, Peter Bowman and Laura Poitras | Nominated | |
| Cinema Eye Honors | January 8, 2026 | Outstanding Original Music Score | Maya Shenfeld | Nominated | |
| Cinema Eye Honors | January 8, 2026 | Audience Choice Prize | Cover-Up | Longlisted | |
| Cinema Eye Honors | January 8, 2026 | The Unforgettables | Seymour Hersh | Won | |
| Astra Awards | January 9, 2026 | Best Documentary Feature | Cover-Up | Nominated | |
| AARP Movies for Grownups Awards | January 10, 2026 | Best Documentary | Cover-Up | Nominated | |
| Producers Guild of America Awards | February 28, 2026 | Best Documentary | Laura Poitras, Mark Obenhaus, Yoni Golijov and Olivia Streisand | Nominated | |
| National Board of Review | January 13, 2026 | Best Documentary | Cover-Up | Won | |
| Academy Awards | March 15, 2026 | Best Documentary Feature Film | Cover-Up | Shortlisted | |
