= Union (film) =

2024 American documentary film

- Theatrical release poster
- Directed by: Brett Story; Stephen Maing
- Produced by: Samantha Curley; Mars Verrone
- Cinematography: Martin DiCicco
- Edited by: Blair McClendon; Malika Zouhali-Worrall; Stephen Maing
- Music by: Robert Aiki Aubrey Lowe
- Production companies: Level Ground Productions; Hyperobject Industries; Impact Partners; Ford Foundation; Anonymous Content
- Distributed by: Level Ground Productions
- Release dates: January 21, 2024 (Sundance); October 18, 2024
- Running time: 100 minutes
- Country: United States
- Language: English
- Box office: $47,883

Union is a 2024 American documentary film, directed by Brett Story and Stephen Maing. It follows the Amazon Labor Union as they seek to unionize Amazon's JFK8 Warehouse in Staten Island.

It had its world premiere at the 2024 Sundance Film Festival on January 21, 2024, and was released on October 18 by Level Ground Productions.

== Premise ==
The film follows former and current workers of Amazon, as they form the Amazon Labor Union, and take on the company to form a union.

== Production ==
In 2020, producers Samantha Curley and Mars Verrone contacted labor organizer Chris Smalls to discuss making a documentary about his efforts to organize workers at Amazon's JFK8 warehouse in Staten Island. Curley and Verrone brought on director Brett Story after seeing her short film CamperForce, about Amazon's seasonal workforce.

As Smalls and his fellow organizers formed the Amazon Labor Union and began a union drive at the warehouse, Story saw the opportunity to make a film about “a new generation of labor organizers, a generation that’s grown up entirely in the post-Reagan era of union decline and globalized corporate capital, and who would be learning, in real time, how to organize collectively and outside of mainstream union support”.

Five months into production, Story invited Stephen Maing to co-direct the film. Together, they followed organizing efforts on Zoom and on the ground in Staten Island, as well as internal efforts by Amazon to discourage employees from joining the union. They showed the film to participants in the project, in order to vet anything that could potentially be high-risk or fireable, with all of them responding well to the film. An interview with a union-buster was filmed but cut during post-production, in order to keep the film focused on the organizers.

The film received grants from Catapult Film Fund, Field of Vision, International Documentary Association, Sundance Institute, NBCU Academy/NBC News Studios, Chicken & Egg Pictures and Hot Docs Canadian International Film Festival.

== Release ==
The film had its world premiere at the 2024 Sundance Film Festival where it won the U.S. Documentary Special Jury Award for the Art of Change. In June 2024, it was announced Level Ground Productions would self-distribute the film, setting an October 18, 2024, release. The filmmakers opted for a self-distributed release after distributors failed to acquire the film, with some stating they loved the film but unable to distribute due to an ongoing relationship with Amazon MGM Studios. It was broadcast on PBS as part of POV on June 23, 2025.

== Reception ==
On the review aggregator website Rotten Tomatoes, 89% of 35 critics' reviews are positive, with an average rating of 7.7/10. The website's consensus reads: "A necessary and stark reminder of the power of the people, this documentary shines a bright light on the importance of a Union." Metacritic, which uses a weighted average, assigned the film a score of 80 out of 100, based on 11 critics, indicating "generally favorable" reviews.
