= In the Summers =

2024 American film directed by Alessandra Lacorazza

- Theatrical release poster
- Directed by: Alessandra Lacorazza
- Written by: Alessandra Lacorazza
- Produced by: Janek Ambros; Lynette Coll; Cynthia Fernandez De La Cruz; Alexander Dinelaris; Cristóbal Güell; Sergio Lira; Rob Quadrino; Jan Suter; Daniel Tantalean; Nando Vila; Slava Vladimirov; Stephanie Yankwitt
- Starring: René Pérez; Sasha Calle; Lío Mehiel; Leslie Grace
- Cinematography: Alejandro Mejía
- Edited by: Adam Dicterow
- Music by: Eduardo Cabra
- Production companies: Lexicon; Bluestone Entertainment; Exile Content Studio; 1868 Studios; Luz Films
- Distributed by: Music Box Films
- Release dates: January 22, 2024 (Sundance); September 20, 2024 (United States)
- Running time: 95 minutes
- Countries: United States; Mexico
- Languages: English; Spanish
- Box office: $90,443

In the Summers is a 2024 coming-of-age drama film written and directed by Alessandra Lacorazza in her feature directorial debut. Starring René Pérez, Sasha Calle, Lío Mehiel, and Leslie Grace, the film follows Eva (Calle) and Violeta (Mehiel), two sisters from California, and their tumultuous relationship with their estranged father Vicente (Pérez) as they spend their summers visiting him in Las Cruces, New Mexico, over the course of several years.

In the Summers premiered at the Sundance Film Festival on January 22, 2024, where it won the Grand Jury Prize and Lacorazza won the Best Director Award. The film was theatrically released in the United States on September 20, 2024, to positive reviews from critics.

== Plot ==
This film centers on two sisters navigating fraught summer visits with their father. In the first act, we see Vicente, their father, greet his two young daughters, Eva and Violeta, and spends good time with them. In the second act, the two girls, now in their early teens, begin to notice their father's drinking problem, causing tension. One night, Vicente is driving drunk and runs the car off the road, injuring Violeta. In the third act, we see that only Eva, in her last year of high school, came to spend time with father Vicente. She tries to reconnect with him, but he is emotionally distant. In the fourth act, both Eva and Violeta came, now adults. Vicente has had another child, and seems to have turned his life around, but now it's the two girls who are emotionally distant from him.

== Cast ==
- René Pérez Joglar as Vicente
- Sasha Calle as Adult Eva
  - Allison Salinas as Middle Eva
  - Luciana Quinonez as Young Eva
- Lío Mehiel as Adult Violeta
  - Kimaya Thais Limón as Middle Violeta
  - Dreya Renae Castillo as Young Violeta
- Emma Ramos as Carmen
- Leslie Grace as Yenny
- Sharlene Cruz as Adult Camila
  - Gabriella Elizabeth Surodjawan as Teen Camila

== Production ==
It is the debut film of Alessandra Lacorazza, and is loosely based on her childhood visiting her father in Colombia during the summers. Production took place in Las Cruces, New Mexico and wrapped in June 2023.

== Release ==
The film premiered in the U.S. Dramatic Competition at the 2024 Sundance Film Festival on January 22, 2024, winning the Grand Jury Prize Dramatic as well as the U.S. Dramatic Award for Directing, Screenwriting and Editing for Lacorazza. In June 2024, Music Box Films acquired U.S. distribution rights to the film, planning a limited theatrical release on September 20, 2024, followed by a home video release.

== Reception ==
The film received mostly positive reviews from film critics. On the review aggregator website Rotten Tomatoes, 92% of 50 critics' reviews are positive, with an average rating of 7.3/10. The website's consensus reads: "In the Summers homes in on emotional insights even as its narrative wanders, suggesting a bright future for writer-director Alessandra Lacorazza." Metacritic, which uses a weighted average, assigned the film a score of 83 out of 100, based on 11 critics, indicating "universal acclaim".

Lovia Gyarke of The Hollywood Reporter described the film as "a visual poem" and praised its acting, but criticized the pacing of the final act. Carlos Aguilar of Variety also praised the cast and its focus on "the everyday vicissitudes of ordinary folk", rather than overly inspirational Latino protagonists.

Robert Daniels of Rogerebert.com criticized the film's lack of a strong central narrative, use of cliches and the distance between the audience and the characters, writing that it "has the look of a better film". However, he praised the actors, "especially the organically composed Residente" saying they "give more than the script offers".

Alessandra was the first Latina to win the Sundance Film Festival U.S. Dramatic Grand Jury prize for the film.

Awards
Preceded by A Thousand and One	Sundance Grand Jury Prize: U.S. Dramatic; 2024	Succeeded by
