= Who Moves America =

2026 American documentary film

- Theatrical release poster
- Directed by: Yael Bridge
- Produced by: Yael Bridge; Jeremy Flood; Yoni Golijov; Mars Verrone
- Cinematography: Erick Stoll
- Edited by: Thomas Niles
- Music by: Osei Essed; Santiago Arias-Rozo
- Production companies: Sidereal Time; ITVS
- Distributed by: 8 Above
- Release dates: March 6, 2026 (True/False); September 9, 2026
- Running time: 87 minutes
- Country: United States
- Language: English

Who Moves America is a 2026 documentary film directed and produced by Yael Bridge. It follows UPS workers across the United States as they navigate the challenges of building solidarity with their co-workers ahead of a potential historic strike. Steven Bognar and Astra Taylor serve as executive producers.

It had its world premiere at the True/False Film Festival on March 6, 2026, and was released in a limited release on September 9, 2026, by 8 Above.

== Premise ==
It follows UPS workers across the United States as they navigate the challenges of building solidarity with their co-workers ahead of a potential historic strike.

== Production ==
In July 2023, it was announced Yael Bridge was in production on a documentary revolving around a potential UPS strike. Steven Bognar and Astra Taylor are among the executive producers. The film received support from ITVS.

== Release ==
It had its world premiere at the True/False Film Festival on March 6, 2026. It also screened at the 69th San Francisco International Film Festival on April 27, 2026. In July 2026, 8 Above was set to theatrically distribute the film, with a September 9, 2026, release set.
