= Yoni Golijov =

American producer

- Occupation: Producer
- Years active: 2016–present

Yoni Golijov is an American film producer. Golijov has produced Risk (2016), All the Beauty and the Bloodshed (2022), Cover-Up (2025) and Who Moves America (2026). He has received nominations for an Academy Award, BAFTA, Gotham Award, and Producers Guild of America Award. He is the recipient of an Independent Spirit Award.

== Career ==
Golijov is a frequent collaborator of Laura Poitras, serving as a producer at her company, Praxis Films. He has produced multiple films directed by Poitras including Risk, which had its world premiere at the 2016 Cannes Film Festival and acquired by Neon and Showtime. The Year of the Everlasting Storm, All the Beauty and the Bloodshed which had its world premiere at the 79th Venice International Film Festival where it won the Golden Lion, the first for a documentary feature. The film was acquired by Neon and HBO Documentary Films. Golijov received nominations at the Academy Awards, BAFTA, and Gotham Award, Golijov won the Independent Spirit Award for Best Documentary Feature. Cover-Up co-directed with Mark Obenhaus, which was acquired by Netflix, and shortlisted for the 98th Academy Awards. Golijov received a nomination for the Producers Guild of America Award. and They're Here co-directed with Rachel Lauren Mueller.

Golijov co-directed alongside Yael Bridge the documentary short When We Fight, revolving around a teachers strike. He also produced Who Moves America directed by Bridge, which had its world premiere at the True/False Film Festival.
