= Magnus (2016 film) =

- Theatrical release poster
- Directed by: Benjamin Ree
- Written by: Linn-Jeanethe Kyed; Benjamin Ree
- Produced by: Sigurd Mikal Karoliussen
- Starring: Magnus Carlsen; Viswanathan Anand; Garry Kasparov; Henrik Albert Carlsen
- Cinematography: Magnus Flåto; Benjamin Ree
- Edited by: Martin Stoltz; Perry Eriksen
- Music by: Uno Helmersson
- Distributed by: Nordisk Film Distribution
- Release dates: January 11, 2016 (Les Arcs International Film Festival); November 18, 2016 (United States)
- Running time: 78 minutes
- Country: Norway
- Languages: Norwegian; English
- Budget: 7 million (NOK)

Magnus is a 2016 documentary film by Benjamin Ree about the early life of Norwegian chess prodigy Magnus Carlsen, him becoming a Grandmaster at age 13 and winning the FIDE World Chess Championship in 2013. The film premiered at Tribeca Film Festival in 2016, and was sold to 64 countries.

== Premiere ==
Magnus premiered at Tribeca Film Festival in 2016. and became the first Norwegian feature documentary to have its world premiere at the festival. Magnus Carlsen did not attend the premiere of the film, but his family was present. The film became the fastest sold-out film at the festival that year, and the artistic director at Tribeca Film Festival, Frederic Boyer, said the film was one of his favorites that year.

== Critical reception ==
Magnus received mostly positive reviews from film critics. It holds an 81% approval rating on review aggregator website Rotten Tomatoes, based on 21 reviews, with a weighted average of 6.2/10. BBC put the film on its top 10 list, November 2016, as the only documentary on the list, calling the film: "an intimate look at Carlsen’s extraordinary life through archive footage, home movies and interviews." Later, BBC published a behind-the-scenes featurette about the film, showing a clip of Magnus Carlsen playing blindfolded chess against 10 lawyers at Harvard University, beating them all.

== Notable awards ==
- Global Future Prize – Oulu International Children's and Youth Film Festival.
- The Ray of Sunshine – The Norwegian International Film Festival.
- Audience Award – Docville
