= Zucheros =

American filmmaker

- Occupation(s): Film director, screenwriter, artist
- Awards: Alfred P. Sloan Prize
- Website: thezucheros.com

Sam and Andy Zuchero are an American filmmaking duo from Topanga, California. They have been making art together since their teens.

The Zucheros' first feature film, Love Me, premiered at the 2024 Sundance Film Festival. The film, starring Kristen Stewart and Steven Yeun, received the 2024 Alfred P. Sloan Prize, bestowed annually by Alfred P. Sloan Foundation to "an outstanding feature film focusing on science or technology as a theme, or depicting a scientist, engineer, or mathematician as a major character."

== Career ==
The Zucheros' first feature film, Love Me, is described as "a sci-fi romance center[ed] on a satellite and an ocean-bound buoy who become increasingly sentient and fall in love over the course of billions of years." Production took place on location in Alberta, Canada; Vancouver, Canada; and the Dumont Dunes of California before shooting sections of the film on a soundstage. For the sections on the soundstage, the Zucheros worked with production designer Zazu Myers to construct a circular set. The score for the film was written by David Longstreth, the lead singer and guitarist for The Dirty Projectors. Love Me premiered at the 2024 Sundance Film Festival and was released theatrically on January 31, 2025.

== Filmography ==
Year	Title	Director	Writer	Notes	Ref.
2024	Love Me	Yes	Yes		

== Accolades ==
Year	Award	Nominated work	Result	Ref.
2024	Alfred P. Sloan Prize	Love Me	Won	
