= The Hottest August =

2019 documentary film by Brett Story

- Official poster
- Directed by: Brett Story
- Written by: Brett Story
- Produced by: Brett Story; Danielle Varga
- Narrated by: Clare Coulter
- Cinematography: Derek Howard
- Edited by: Nels Bangerter
- Music by: Troy Herion
- Production companies: Oh Ratface Films; Walking Productions
- Release date: November 15, 2019
- Running time: 94 minutes
- Countries: Canada; United States
- Language: English
- Box office: $9,163

The Hottest August is a 2019 Canadian-American documentary film directed by Brett Story. The film is composed of encounters between Story and strangers in New York City in August 2017, then predicted to be the hottest month of August on record in the Northern Hemisphere.The context of global warming frames the confidences shared by the strangers as they are asked about their worries and hopes about the future. The film's official tagline describes it as "a film about climate change, disguised as a portrait of collective anxiety".

The Hottest August premiered at the True/False Film Festival on February 28, 2019, and was subsequently theatrically released on November 15 of the same year. It received critical acclaim.
