= Benjamin Ree =

Norwegian documentarian

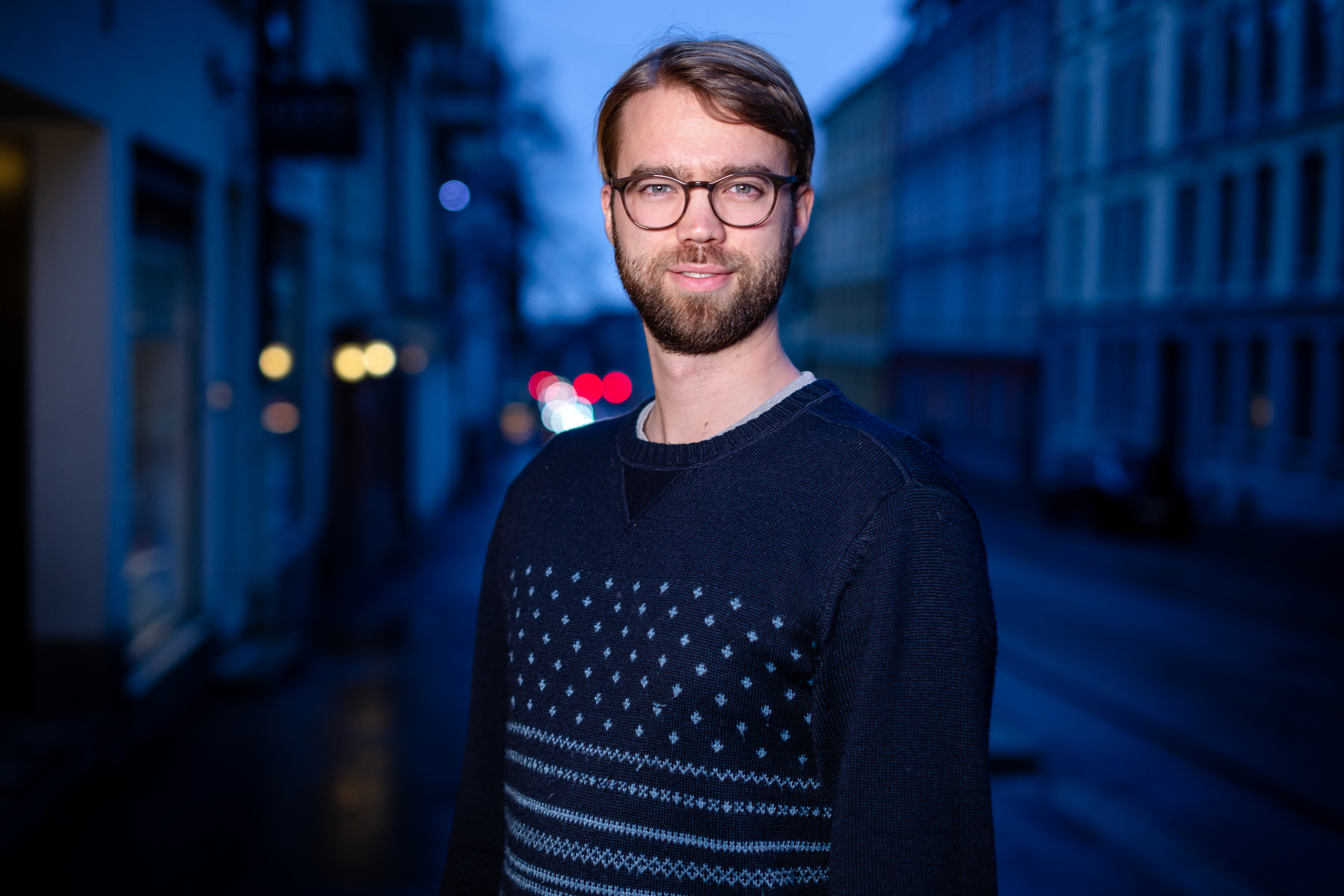
- Ree in 2019
- Born: Benjamin Olafsen Ree; 10 July 1989 (age 37); Hole, Norway
- Education: Oslo Metropolitan University
- Occupation: Film director
- Years active: 2010–present

Benjamin Ree (born July 10, 1989) is a Norwegian director and cinematographer of several documentaries, including Magnus (2016), The Painter and the Thief (2020), and the Peabody Award winning The Remarkable Life of Ibelin (2024).

== Early life ==
Ree began making films at the age of eleven and studied journalism at Oslo Metropolitan University. After his studies Ree worked as a freelance videojournalist for BBC and Reuters, most notably covering the 2011 Norway attacks. Ree has said in interviews that making his first feature Magnus was his film school: "There I understood that I could transfer the interviews to a universal, nonverbal cinematic language."

== Career ==
=== Magnus ===
His debut film, Magnus (2016), premiered at Tribeca Film Festival and was distributed to 64 countries. The film is a coming of age story about the world's best chess player Magnus Carlsen. Magnus received mostly positive reviews. It has an 81% average on Rotten Tomatoes, based on 21 reviews. The BBC praised the film and ranked it on its top ten list, but The New York Times gave the film a negative review. The film won several awards at festivals, including the Global Future Prize at the Oulu International Children's and Youth Film Festival, The Ray of Sunshine prize at the Norwegian International Film Festival, and the Audience Award at Docville.

=== The Painter and the Thief ===
His second feature film, The Painter and the Thief (2020), was one of the opening films at Sundance Film Festival where it won a Special Jury Award for Creative Storytelling. The film tells the story of an artist who befriends the thief who stole two of her paintings. NEON bought the world rights to the film after the Sundance Film Festival premiere. It received overall positive reviews, averaging 97% on Rotten Tomatoes, based on 112 reviews.

The storytelling style of The Painter and the Thief has been met with some criticism. The Painter and the Thief jumps back and forth in time, which is unusual for a documentary using the Cinéma vérité technique. This storytelling style was criticized by some reviewers for weakening the trust between filmmaker and viewer. The A.V. Club wrote that "by scrambling his film’s chronology in ways that threaten to rupture any sense of trust between director and viewer."

The film has been named by Mubi as one of the best in film history, by New York (magazine) to have one of the best movie endings in movie history and as a film that has helped change the documentary film genre. Vanity Fair placed The Painter and the Thief at the top of documentaries that were changing the genre.

The film won over 30 film awards., including the Audience Award for Best Documentary Virtual at the London Film Festival and the Golden FireBird Award at the Hong Kong International Film Festival. In addition the film got a Directors Guild of America nomination and two nominations at the Critics' Choice Movie Awards for best director and best film. It has been ranked as the best film of 2020 by The New York Times, Vox and Aftenposten. The film was named one of the year's best films by BBC, Washington Post, Boston Globe and The Guardian.

=== Ibelin ===
His third documentary feature film, Ibelin, premiered in competition at the 2024 Sundance Film Festival, where it won the World Documentary Directing Award and the Audience Award. It was picked up for distribution by Netflix.

The film documents the life of "Mats Steen, a Norwegian gamer who died of a degenerative muscular disease at the age of 25". The title comes from the name of a character in World of Warcraft.

On the review aggregator website Rotten Tomatoes, 100% of 20 critics' reviews are positive, with an average rating of 8.2/10. Metacritic, which uses a weighted average, assigned the film a score of 72 out of 100, based on nine critics, indicating "generally favorable" reviews. Variety praised the film, stating "It’s a world unto itself, and a glowing example of how moviemaking — like a person’s digital footprint — can be a form of immortality that soothes even the most devastating loss." and calling it "[...]a moving, multifaceted masterwork"

=== Other projects ===
Ree researched and directed the TV documentary series Conversion Therapy with Morten Hegseth (2019) which uncovers how religious groups are offering Conversion Therapy for gay people in Norway. In the aftermath of the series, the Prime Minister of Norway Erna Solberg said that she would stop the practice of conversion therapy in Norway: "We have to ensure that the abuses we have seen documented by VG do not happen in the future", she said.

== Filmography ==
=== Feature-length films ===
- Magnus (2016)
- The Painter and the Thief (2020)
- Ibelin (2024)
