= They're Here (film) =

2026 short documentary film

- Directed by: Laura Poitras; Rachel Lauren Mueller
- Produced by: Laura Poitras; Rachel Lauren Mueller; Yoni Golijov
- Cinematography: Rachel Lauren Mueller
- Edited by: Adriana Pacheco; Laura Poitras
- Music by: Alessandro Cortini
- Production companies: Praxis Films; Arte France; Perspective Films
- Release date: September 7, 2026 (Venice)
- Running time: 25 minutes
- Countries: United States; France
- Languages: English; Spanish

They're Here is a 2026 short documentary film produced and directed by Laura Poitras and Rachel Lauren Mueller. It follows Edén Villa and anonymous residents of Minnesota who resist Operation Metro Surge by United States Immigration and Customs Enforcement (ICE).

The film had its world premiere out of competition of the 83rd Venice International Film Festival on September 7, 2026.

== Premise ==
Edén Villa and anonymous residents of Minnesota resist Operation Metro Surge by United States Immigration and Customs Enforcement.

== Production ==
Production commenced in January 2026 to document the events of Operation Metro Surge, using street-level filming done by Rachel Lauren Mueller and others, dashboard cameras, and crowdsourcing and mapping data.

== Release ==
It had its world premiere out of competition of the 83rd Venice International Film Festival on September 7, 2026. It also screened at the Camden International Film Festival on September 20 and in the Currents section of the 2026 New York Film Festival on September 29 with further screenings to be announced.

== Accolades ==
Award	Date	Category	Recipient(s)	Result	Ref.
Critics' Choice Documentary Awards	November 8, 2026	Best Short Documentary	They're Here	Nominated	
