= Girls Will Be Girls (2024 film) =

- Theatrical release poster
- Directed by: Shuchi Talati
- Written by: Shuchi Talati
- Produced by: Richa Chadha; Claire Chassagne; Shuchi Talati
- Starring: Preeti Panigrahi; Kesav Binoy Kiron; Kani Kusruti
- Cinematography: Jih-E Peng
- Edited by: Amrita David
- Music by: Pierre Oberkampf; Sneha Khanwalkar
- Production companies: Pushing Buttons Studios; Blink Digital; Cinema Inutile; Crawling Angel Films; Dolce Vita Films
- Distributed by: Amazon Prime Video
- Release dates: January 2024 (Sundance); 18 December 2024 (Prime Video)
- Running time: 118 minutes
- Countries: India; France
- Languages: English; Hindi

Girls Will Be Girls is a 2024 coming-of-age drama film, written and directed by Shuchi Talati. It stars Preeti Panigrahi, Kani Kusruti, and Kesav Binoy Kiron. An Indian and French co-production, the film is Talati's feature directorial debut, as well as the acting debut of both Panigrahi and Kiron. The film is set in a boarding school in the Himalayan foothills, and centers around teenager Mira's romance with a charming new student, her subsequent sexual awakening, and at times strained relationship with her protective mother.

The film premiered at the 2024 Sundance Film Festival, where it participated in the competition section. It was released on 18 December 2024, on Amazon Prime Video. Among the film's accolades, it won the Independent Spirit John Cassavetes Award.

== Plot ==
Mira Kishore, a high school teenager, becomes the first girl in her boarding school's history to be appointed Head Perfect while also being the academic topper. Amid the congratulatory cheers, Mira feels annoyed to see her mother, Anila, distributing sweets on the school premises. Mira scolds her, reminding her that parents are not allowed on campus. However, Anila, an alumna of the same school, points out that the rule does not apply to ex-students. She takes pride in Mira's achievement and discusses its rarity with a senior teacher, Miss Bansal.

Meanwhile, Mira befriends Srinivas (Sri), a new student with a keen passion for astronomy. Their connection blossoms during a stargazing session, and they grow closer, sharing secrets and exchanging phone numbers. However, late-night calls with Sri raise Anila's concerns, as she fears Mira might lose focus during this crucial academic year. Anila decides to meet Sri and invites him home. Despite her initial reservations, she finds him quite mature for his age and allows the two to study together at their house. Over time, the trio share lively conversations, with Anila often reminiscing about her school days.

As Mira and Sri grow closer, Mira experiences the early stirrings of romance and sexual experiences but feels hurt when he hides parts of his past. Despite this, their bond deepens, though Mira becomes envious of Sri's warm rapport with her mother. Tensions escalate during Sri's birthday celebration at Mira's home, where she feels overshadowed by her mother's presence in their friendship. Sri insists to Mira that earning Anila's trust is vital for their relationship to thrive.

At school, Mira faces challenges as Head Prefect, particularly during Teacher's Day when she struggles to command respect from her peers. She heads to the terrace to be alone, where Sri follows her. Upon realizing that they don't have the key to the terrace gate, Sri promises to obtain the key from Miss Bansal, saying "people have keys too". Shortly after, a confrontation with a group of boys she had previously reported leaves her shaken. Mira locks herself in the girls’ hostel after being chased by the boys and calls Anila to take her home. The incident sparks a clash between Anila and Miss Bansal, with the latter criticizing Mira's declining academic performance and her mother's permissive attitude towards her relationship with Sri, while Anila strongly defends Mira.

Back at home, Sri joins Mira and Anila and shares his perspective about getting what he wants from people. He speaks about how keys can unlock personalities, revealing to them that his key to Mira is "no bullshit". Sri privately reiterates to Mira the importance of being there for her mother, who has quietly endured a lonely life, and says that Anila's key is receiving attention. Mira finally understands Sri's manipulative nature and that she has underestimated her mother's feelings and sacrifices. When Sri asks if he can return the following Saturday, Mira says no. In a tender moment, the story concludes with Mira lovingly oiling her mother's hair, as they finally reconcile.

== Cast ==
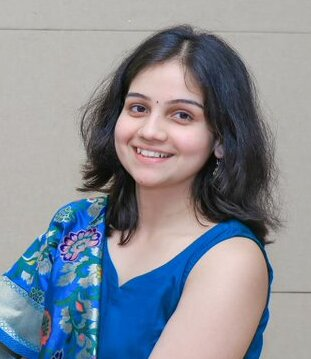
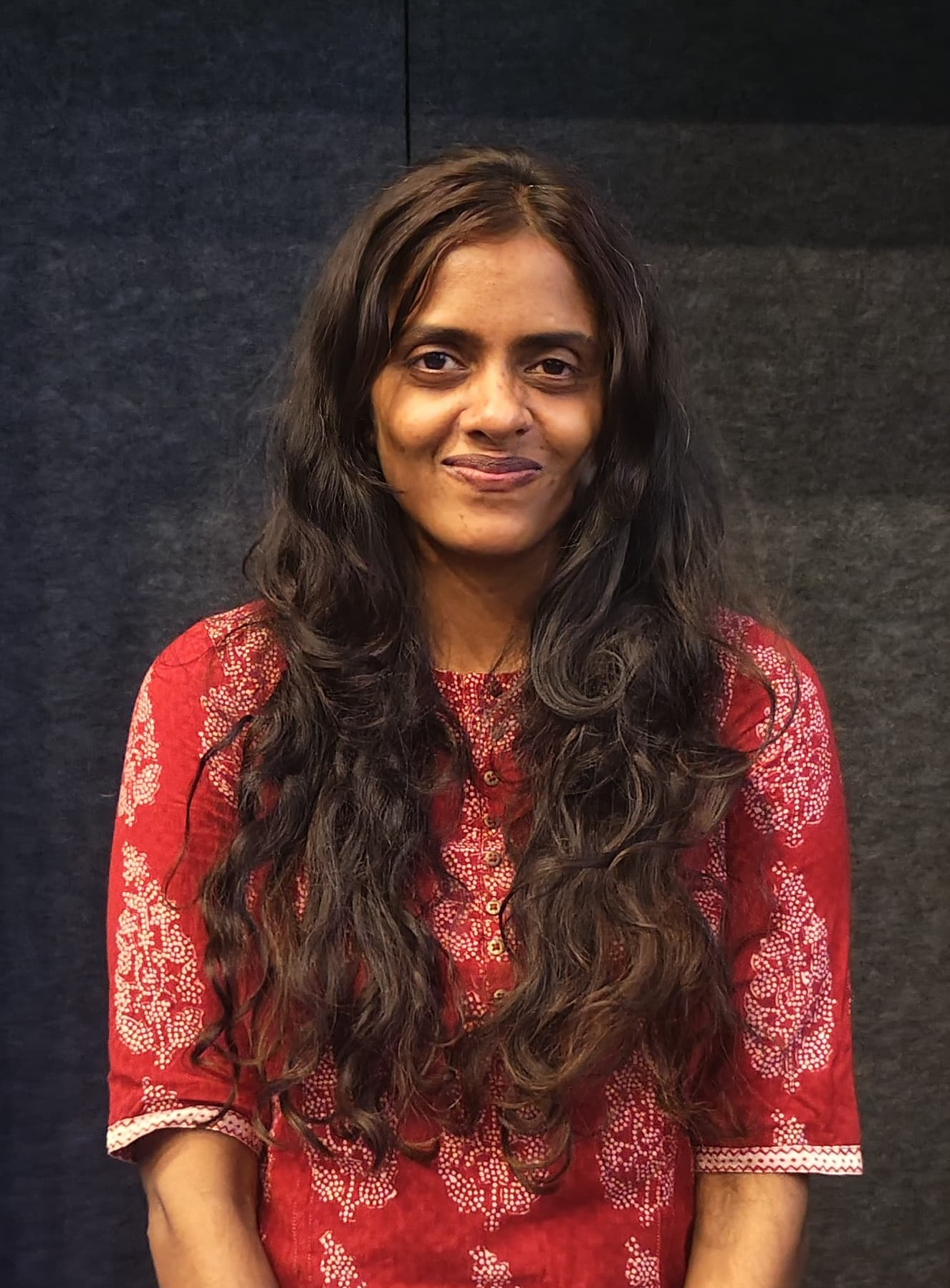
Preeti Panigrahi (top) and Kani Kusruti (bottom) played the lead roles.
- Preeti Panigrahi as Mira
- Kesav Binoy Kiron as Srinivas
- Kani Kusruti as Anila, Mira's mother
- Kajol Chugh as Priya, Mira's classmate
- Aman Desai as Vikrant, Mira's classmate
- Akash Pramanik as Hardik, Mira's classmate
- Jatin Gulati as Harish, Mira's father
- Devika Shahani as Ms. Bansal, Mira's teacher

== Production ==
Talati conceived the story of the film in 2018, drawing from her own experiences as a young girl, her school in Vadodara, and Enid Blyton's book series Malory Towers and St. Clare's. At the direction of Talati, the film was produced by a majority female crew in order to create a safe space where "girls could be girls." The female crew include producers Claire Chassagne and Richa Chadha, Taiwanese cinematographer Jih-E Peng, production designer Avyakta Kapur, and editor Amrita David. The film was produced by Pushing Buttons Studios, and received a production grant from the French Aide aux Cinemas du Monde in 2021. It was shot in over 45 days in the northern Indian region of Uttarakhand, and in the capital Dehradun.

== Release ==
The film had its premiere at the 2024 Sundance Film Festival, participating in the competition section of the festival in January 2024.

The film also entered for the 47th iteration of the Gothenburg Film Festival. The film was screened in 'Horizons' at the 58th Karlovy Vary International Film Festival on 28 June 2024. The film was screened in 'Narrative New Waves' at the 2024 Atlantic International Film Festival on 12 September 2024. It was also invited at the 29th Busan International Film Festival in 'Special program in focus' Teenage Minds, Teenage Movies section and it will be screened in October 2024. The film was selected for the MAMI Mumbai Film Festival 2024, where it competed in the South Asia Competition section in October 2024. It received a special mention from the jury, as well as the NETPAC award, the Young Critics Choice Award, and the Film Critics Guild Gender Sensitivity Award.

The film was released on Amazon Prime Video, on 18 December 2024.

== Reception ==
On the review aggregator website Rotten Tomatoes, 100% of 61 critics' reviews are positive, with an average rating of 7.7/10. The website's consensus reads: "A deeply felt coming of age tale that gleans insightful societal commentary from its intimate details, Girls Will Be Girls announces writer-director Shuchi Talati as a talent to watch." Metacritic, which uses a weighted average, assigned the film a score of 79 out of 100, based on 13 critics, indicating "generally favorable" reviews.

Wendy Ide of The Guardian wrote, "Talati's work with her young cast is first-rate; this sensitively handled coming-of-age picture deservedly won an audience prize at Sundance". Writing for The Hollywood Reporter, Indian critic Anupama Chopra termed it "quietly heartbreaking" and added that "female teenage sexuality has rarely been captured with this sensitivity and nuance in an Indian film".

== Awards ==
- World Cinema Dramatic (Audience) at 2024 Sundance Film Festival
- World Cinema Dramatic Special Jury Award for Acting - Preeti Panigrahi (Mira) at 2024 Sundance Film Festival
- NETPAC award at MAMI Mumbai Film Festival 2024
- Young Critics Choice Award at MAMI Mumbai Film Festival 2024
- Film Critics Guild Gender Sensitivity Award at MAMI Mumbai Film Festival 2024
- Breakthrough Director nomination at Gotham Independent Film Awards 2024
- Independent Spirit John Cassavetes Award
