= Realm of Satan =

- Directed by: Scott Cummings
- Release date: 2024
- Country: United States
- Language: English

Realm of Satan is a 2024 documentary film.

== Overview ==
A look into the Church of Satan.

== Release ==
The film had its world premiere at the 2024 Sundance Film Festival on January 21.
