= In the Land of Brothers =

- Film Poster
- Dar Sarzamin-e Baradar
- Directed by: Alireza Ghasemi, Raha Amirfazli
- Written by: Alireza Ghasemi, Raha Amirfazli
- Produced by: Adrien Barrouillet, Alireza Ghasemi, Raha Amirfazli, Charles Meresse, Emma Binet, Frank Hoeve, Aria Ghavamian
- Starring: Hamideh Jafari, Bashir Nikzad, Mohammad Hosseini
- Cinematography: Farshad Mohammadi
- Edited by: Haydeh Safiyari
- Music by: Frederic Alvarez
- Production companies: Furyo Films; Limited Circle; Baldr Film
- Distributed by: JHR Films; September Film
- Release date: 22 January 2024 (Sundance Film Festival)
- Running time: 95 minutes
- Countries: France, Iran, Netherlands
- Language: Persian

In the Land of Brothers is a 2024 drama film written and directed by Alireza Ghasemi and Raha Amirfazli. It is an Iranian-French-Dutch international co-production. In the Land of Brothers had its world premiere at the Sundance Film Festival on 22 January 2024.

== Premise ==
Under the shadow of the US invasion, an extended Afghan refugee family begins their new lives in Iran unaware of the ultimate price expected of them as outliers in this (un)welcoming environment: Mohammad, a young teenager and promising student; Leila, a woman isolated by geography, and Qasem who bears the weight of his family's sacrifice.

== Cast ==
- Hamideh Jafari as Leila
- Bashir Nikzad as Qasem
- Mohammad Hosseini as Mohammad
- Marjan Khaleghi as Hanie
- Hajeer Moradi as Asgari
- Marjan Etefaghian as Negin
- Mehran Vosuoghi as Behanam

== Production ==
The film had the support of L'Aide aux Cinémas du Monde, Centre National Du Cinéma et de l'Image Animée, Institut Français, Netherlands Film Fund and Ciclic Région Centre Val de Loire, as well as the participation of Le CNC Région Ile-de-France, Asian Cinema Fund and Vipo.

== Release ==
The film premiered at the Sundance Film Festival in the World Dramatic Competition on January 20, 2024. It had its European premiere at the Karlovy Vary Film Festival on June 2, 2024.

== Reception ==
On the review aggregator website Rotten Tomatoes, 100% of 19 critics' reviews are positive, with an average rating of 6.9/10. The film won the Best Director Award in world cinema competition of the Sundance Film Festival 2024.

Award	Date of ceremony	Category	Recipient(s)	Result	Ref.
Sundance Film Festival	27 January 2024	Directing Award – World Cinema Dramatic Competition	Alireza Ghasemi, Raha Amirfazli	Won	
Sundance Film Festival	27 January 2024	Grand Jury Prize – World Cinema Dramatic Competition	Alireza Ghasemi, Raha Amirfazli	Nominated	
Malaysia International Film Festival	28 July 2024	Best Directing	Alireza Ghasemi, Raha Amirfazli	Won	
Film Fest Sundsvall	5 October 2024	Best International Film	Alireza Ghasemi, Raha Amirfazli	Won	
Saint-Jean-de-Luz International Film Festival	12 October 2024	Best Film	Alireza Ghasemi, Raha Amirfazli	Won	
Saint-Jean-de-Luz International Film Festival	12 October 2024	Best Actress	Hamideh Jafari	Won	
Pessac International Film Festival	23 November 2024	Best Film	Alireza Ghasemi, Raha Amirfazli	Won	
Carcassonne International Film Festival	20 January 2025	Best Film	Alireza Ghasemi, Raha Amirfazli	Won	

Murtada Elfadl, reviewing for Variety, wrote, " With deft storytelling and assured filmmaking, they tell the story of an extended family from Afghanistan and their 20-year odyssey to find shelter and home in neighboring Iran after the American invasion of 2011."

Grace Han, reviewing at the Sundance Film Festival for Asian Movie Pulse, wrote, "This is the first co-directed feature for Amirfazli and Ghasemi; the first feature for acting co-lead, Mohammad Hosseini; and finally, the first time on-camera for co-lead Hamideh Jafari. Despite the many firsts, the feature is remarkably well-crafted, as Amirfazli and Ghasemi exhibit their natural inclination as storytellers. "

Namarata Joshi of Cinema Express reviewing the film at Sundance Film Festival praised the directors' approach, "The stories are told straight and simple, without sentimentality and stylistic flourishes. It's quietude and thrift that lend the film its humane depth and overwhelming compassion. There's clarity, conviction, and grace to their filmmaking."
