= 2024 Sundance Film Festival =

Edition of film festival

- Festival poster
- Location: Park City, Utah
- Founded: 1978
- Hosted by: Sundance Institute
- Festival date: January 18 to 28, 2024
- Language: English
- Website: festival.sundance.org
- 2025 Sundance Film Festival 2023 Sundance Film Festival

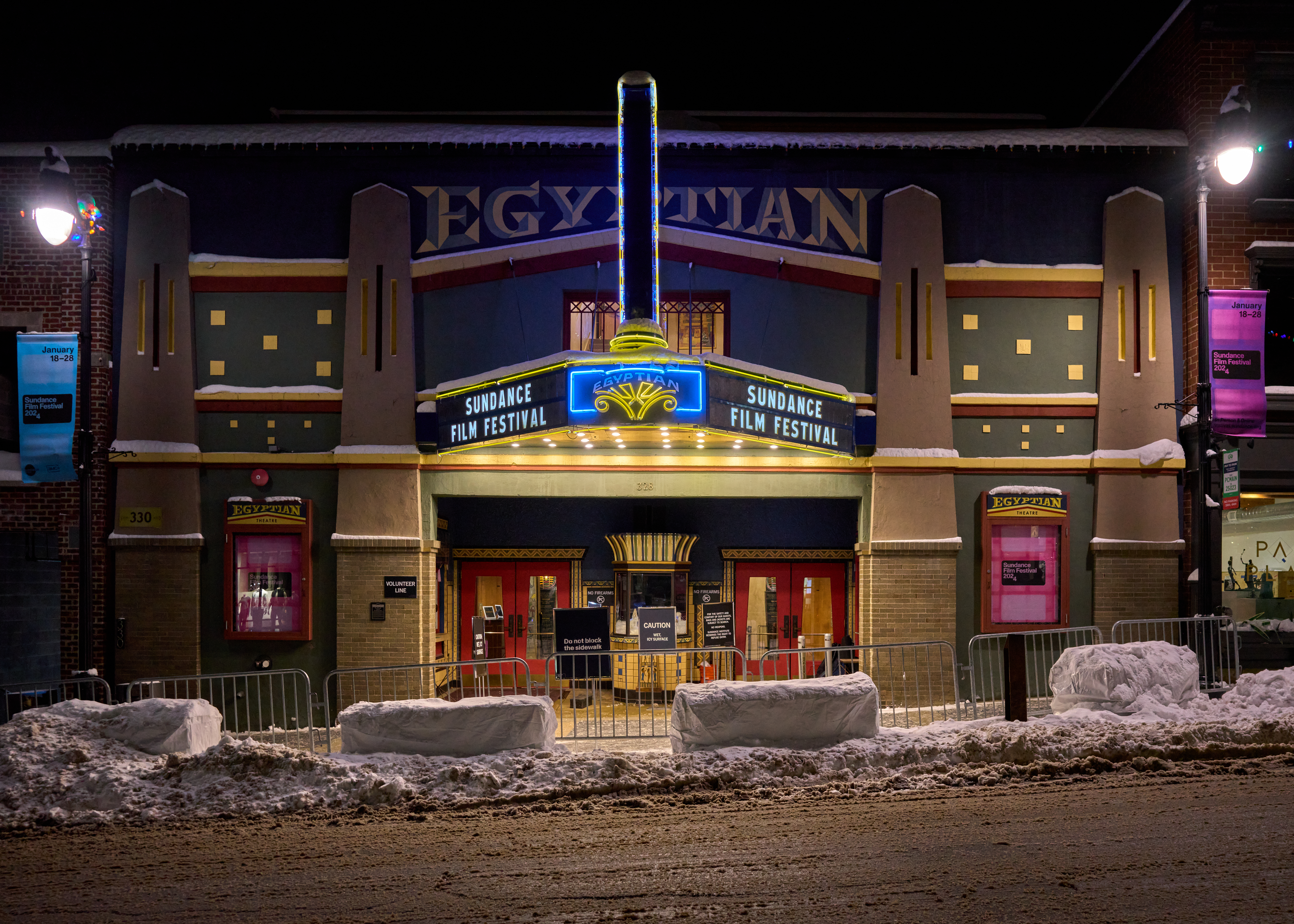
The Egyptian Theater on the eve of the Sundance Film Festival 2024

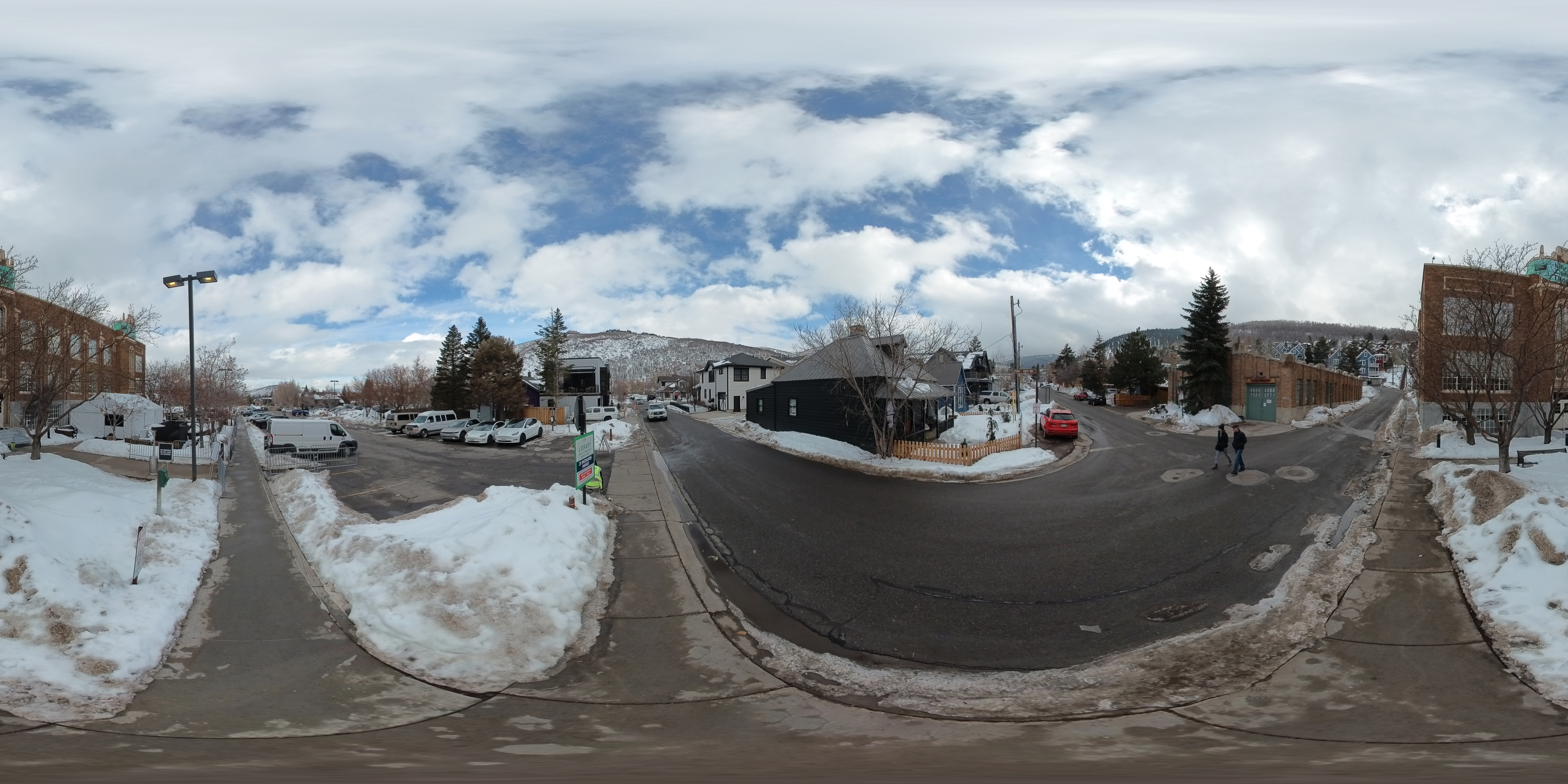
Library Center Theatre, Sundance Film Festival (view as a 360° interactive panorama)

The 2024 Sundance Film Festival took place from January 18 to 28, 2024. The first lineup of competition films was announced on December 6, 2023.

Among the highlighted events included the premiere of a documentary about the 1980s rock band Devo.

== Films ==
=== U.S. Dramatic Competition ===
English title	Original title	Director(s)	Production Country
Between the Temples		Nathan Silver	United States
Dìdi	弟弟	Sean Wang	United States
Exhibiting Forgiveness		Titus Kaphar	United States
Good One		India Donaldson	United States
In the Summers		Alessandra Lacorazza Samudio	United States
Love Me		Sam Zuchero, Andy Zuchero	United States
Ponyboi		Esteban Arango	United States
A Real Pain		Jesse Eisenberg	United States
Stress Positions		Theda Hammel	United States
Suncoast		Laura Chinn	United States

=== World Cinema Dramatic Competition ===
English title	Original title	Director(s)	Production Country
Brief History of a Family	家庭简史	Jianjie Lin	China, France, Denmark, Qatar
Girls Will Be Girls		Shuchi Talati	India, France, United States, Norway
Handling the Undead		Thea Hvistendahl	Norway
In the Land of Brothers	در سرزمین برادر	Alireza Ghasemi, Raha Amirfazli	Iran, France, Netherlands
Layla		Amrou Al-Kadhi	United Kingdom
Malu		Pedro Freire	Brazil
Reinas		Klaudia Reynicke	Switzerland, Peru, Spain
Sebastian		Mikko Mäkelä	United Kingdom, Finland, Belgium
Sujo		Astrid Rondero, Fernanda Valadez	Mexico, United States, France
Veni Vidi Vici		Daniel Hoesl	Austria

=== U.S. Documentary Competition ===
Original title	Director(s)	Production Country
As We Speak	J.M. Harper	United States
Daughters	Angela Patton, Natalie Rae	United States
Every Little Thing	Sally Aitken	Australia
Frida	Carla Gutiérrez	United States, Mexico
Gaucho Gaucho	Michael Dweck, Gregory Kershaw	United States, Argentina
Love Machina	Peter Sillen	United States
Porcelain War	Brendan Bellomo, Slava Leontyev	United States, Ukraine
Skywalkers: A Love Story	Jeff Zimbalist, Maria Bukhonina	United States
Sugarcane	Julian Brave NoiseCat, Emily Kassie	United States, Canada
Union	Stephen Maing, Brett Story	United States

=== World Documentary Competition ===
English title	Original title	Director(s)	Production Country
Agent of Happiness		Arun Bhattarai, Dorottya Zurbó	Bhutan, Hungary
The Battle for Laikipia		Daphne Matziaraki, Peter Murimi	Kenya, United States
Black Box Diaries		Shiori Itō	Japan, United States, United Kingdom
Eternal You		Hans Block, Moritz Riesewieck	Germany, United States
Ibelin		Benjamin Ree	Norway
IGUALADA		Juan Mejía Botero	Colombia, United States, Mexico
Never Look Away		Lucy Lawless	New Zealand
A New Kind of Wilderness		Silje Evensmo Jacobsen	Norway
Nocturnes		Anirban Dutta, Anupama Srinivasan	India
Soundtrack to a Coup d’Etat		Johan Grimonprez	Belgium, France, Netherlands

=== Premieres ===
English title	Original title	Director(s)	Production Country
The American Society of Magical Negroes		Kobi Libii	United States
And So It Begins		Ramona Diaz	United States, Philippines
DEVO		Chris Smith	United Kingdom, United States
A Different Man		Aaron Schimberg	United States
Freaky Tales		Anna Boden and Ryan Fleck	United States
Ghostlight		Kelly O'Sullivan, Alex Thompson	United States
Girls State		Amanda McBaine, Jesse Moss	United States
Look into My Eyes		Lana Wilson	United States
Luther: Never Too Much		Dawn Porter	United States
My Old Ass		Megan Park	United States
The Outrun		Nora Fingscheidt	United Kingdom, Germany
Power		Yance Ford	United States
Presence		Steven Soderbergh	United States
Rob Peace		Chiwetel Ejiofor	United States
Sasquatch Sunset		David Zellner, Nathan Zellner	United States
Sue Bird: In The Clutch		Sarah Dowland	United States
Super/Man: The Christopher Reeve Story		Ian Bonhôte, Peter Ettedgui	United Kingdom, United States
Thelma		Josh Margolin	United States
Will & Harper		Josh Greenbaum	United States
Winner		Susanna Fogel	United States, Canada

=== Next ===
English title	Director(s)	Production Country
Desire Lines	Jules Rosskam	United States
Kneecap	Rich Peppiatt	Ireland, United Kingdom
Junk (premiered as Little Death)	Jack Begert	United States
Realm of Satan	Scott Cummings	United States
Seeking Mavis Beacon	Jazmin Renée Jones	United States
Tendaberry	Haley Elizabeth Anderson	United States

=== Midnight ===
English title	Director(s)	Production Country
In a Violent Nature	Chris Nash	Canada
I Saw the TV Glow	Jane Schoenbrun	United States
It's What's Inside	Greg Jardin	United States
Kidnapping Inc.	Bruno Mourral	Haiti, France, Canada
Krazy House	Steffen Haars, Flip van der Kuil	Netherlands
Love Lies Bleeding	Rose Glass	United States, United Kingdom
The Moogai	Jon Bell	Australia
Your Monster	Caroline Lindy	United States

=== Spotlight ===
English title	Original title	Director(s)	Production Country
Àma Gloria		Marie Amachoukeli	France
Hit Man		Richard Linklater	United States
How to Have Sex		Molly Manning Walker	United Kingdom
The Mother of All Lies	كذب أبيض	Asmae El Moudir	Morocco, Egypt, Saudi Arabia, Qatar

=== Special Screenings ===
English title	Director(s)	Production Country
War Game	Jesse Moss, Tony Gerber	United States
Family Matinee: 10 Lives	Chris Jenkins	United Kingdom
Family Matinee: Out of My Mind	Amber Sealey	United States
New Frontier: Being (the Digital Griot)	Rashaad Newsome	United States
New Frontier: Eno	Gary Hustwit	United States, United Kingdom

=== Episodic ===
Original title	Director(s)	Production Country
Fiction
Me/We (episode 1)	Nzingha Stewart	United States
La Mesías (episode 1)	Javier Calvo, Javier Ambrossi	Spain
Penelope (episode 1)	Mel Eslyn, Mark Duplass	United States
Non-Fiction
Better Angels: The Gospel According To Tammy Faye (episodes 1 and 2)	Dana Adam Shapiro	United States
Conbody vs Everybody (episodes 1 and 2)	Debra Granik	United States
Lolla: The Story of Lollapalooza (episodes 1 and 2)	Michael John Warren	United States
God Save Texas (3 episodes)	Richard Linklater, Iliana Sosa, Alex Stapleton	United States
The Synanon Fix (episode 1)	Rory Kennedy	United States

=== Anniversary Screenings ===
Original title	Director(s)	Production Country
The Babadook	Jennifer Kent	Australia
Dig! XX	Ondi Timoner	United States
Go Fish	Rose Troche	United States
Mississippi Masala	Mira Nair	United States
Napoleon Dynamite	Jared Hess	United States
Pariah	Dee Rees	United States
The Times of Harvey Milk	Rob Epstein	United States
Three Seasons	Tony Bui	Vietnam, United States

=== U.S. Fiction Short Films ===
Title	Director(s)	Production Country
Bay of Herons	Jared James Lank	United States
Boi de Conchas (The Shell Covered Ox)	Daniel Barosa	United States
Border Hopper	Nico Casavecchia	United States
BUST	Angalis Field	United States
Didn’t Think I’d See You Here	Dylan Guerra	United States
Dream Creep	Carlos A.F. Lopez	United States
Flail	Ben Gauthier	United States
Grace	Natalie Jasmine Harris	United States
guts	Margaux Susi	United States
The Heart	Malia Ann	United States
The Looming	Masha Ko	United States
The Looming Cloud	Matthew Tyler	United States
The Lost Season	Kelly Sears	United States
Pasture Prime	Diffan Sina Norman	United States
Pathological	Alison Rich	United States
The Rainbow Bridge	Dimitri Simakis	United States
Say Hi After You Die	Kate Jean Hollowell	United States
Shé (Snake)	Renee Zhan	United States
Thirstygirl	Alexandra Qin	United States

=== International Fiction Short Films ===
Title	Director(s)	Production Country
Basri & Salma in a Never-Ending Comedy	Khozy Rizal	Indonesia, United States
Bold Eagle	Whammy Alcazaren	Philippines
Bye Bye, Bowser	Jasmin Baumgartner	Austria
Dreams like paper boats	Samuel Frantz Suffren	Haiti
Essex Girls	Yero Timi-Biu	United Kingdom
Lea Tupu’anga / Mother Tongue	Vea Mafile’o	New Zealand
The Masterpiece	Alex Lora Cercos	Spain
Phoebe	Vaggelio Soumeli	Greece/Cyprus
Pisko the Crab Child is in Love	Makoto Nagahisa	Japan
Shalal	Amir Ali Sisipour	Iran
The Stag	An Chu	Taiwan
Terra Mater	Kantarama Gahigiri	Rwanda/Switzerland
Viaje de Negocios	Gerardo Coello Escalante	Mexico
Voice Ever	Céline Perreard	France

=== Animated Short Films ===
Title	Director(s)	Production Country
27	Flóra Anna Buda	France/Hungary
Lake Baikal (Baigal Nuur)	Alisi Telengut	Canada/Germany
The Bleacher	Nicole Daddona, Adam Wilder	United States
Bug Diner	Phoebe Jane Hart	United States
Dona Beatriz Ñsîmba Vita	Catapreta	Brazil
Drago	Daniel Zvereff	United States
Larry	Takeshi Murata	United States
Martyr’s Guidebook	Maks Rzontkowski	Poland
Matta and Matto	Bianca Caderas, Kerstin Zemp	Switzerland
Miisufy	Liisi Grünberg	Estonia

=== Nonfiction Short Films ===
Title	Director(s)	Production Country
14 Paintings	Dongnan Chen	China
ALOK	Alex Hedison	United States
Bob’s Funeral	Jack Dunphy	United States
Ekbeh	Mariah Hernandez-Fitch	United States
Merman	Sterling Hampton IV	United States
Object 817	Olga Lucovnicova	Belgium
Salone Love	Tajana Tokyo	United States/United Kingdom/Sierra Leone
The Smallest Power	Andy Sarjahani	Iran
To Be Invisible	Myah Overstreet	United States
Winding Path	Alexandra Lazarowich, Ross Kauffman	United States

== Awards ==
The following awards were given out:

=== Grand Jury Prizes ===
- U.S. Dramatic – In the Summers (Alessandra Lacorazza)
- U.S. Documentary – Porcelain War (Brendan Bellomo and Slava Leontyev)
- World Cinema Dramatic – Sujo (Astrid Rondero and Fernanda Valadez)
- World Cinema Documentary – A New Kind of Wilderness (Silje Evensmo Jacobsen)
- Short Film – The Masterpiece (Alex Lora Cercos)

=== Audience Awards ===
- Festival Favorite – Daughters (Angela Patton and Natalie Rae)
- U.S. Dramatic – Dìdi (弟弟) (Sean Wang)
- U.S. Documentary – Daughters (Angela Patton and Natalie Rae)
- World Cinema Dramatic – Girls Will Be Girls (Shuchi Talati)
- World Cinema Documentary – Ibelin (Benjamin Ree)
- NEXT – Kneecap (Rich Peppiatt)

=== Directing, Screenwriting and Editing ===
- U.S. Dramatic – Alessandra Lacorazza for In the Summers
- U.S. Documentary – Julian Brave NoiseCat and Emily Kassie for Sugarcane
- World Cinema Dramatic – Raha Amirfazli and Alireza Ghasemi for In the Land of Brothers
- World Cinema Documentary – Benjamin Ree for Ibelin
- Waldo Salt Screenwriting Award – Jesse Eisenberg for A Real Pain
- Jonathan Oppenheim Editing Award: U.S. Documentary – Carla Gutiérrez for Frida
- NEXT Innovator Prize – Little Death

=== Special Jury Prizes ===
- U.S. Dramatic Special Jury Award: Ensemble Cast – The cast of Dìdi (弟弟)
- U.S. Dramatic Special Jury Award: Breakthrough Performance – Nico Parker for Suncoast
- U.S. Documentary Special Jury Award: The Art of Change – Union (Stephen Maing and Brett Story)
- U.S. Documentary Special Jury Award: Sound – Gaucho Gaucho
- World Cinema Dramatic Special Jury Award: Acting – Preeti Panigrahi for Girls Will Be Girls
- World Cinema Dramatic Special Jury Award: Original Music – Peter Raeburn for Handling the Undead
- World Cinema Documentary Special Jury Award: Cinematic Innovation – Johan Grimonprez for Soundtrack to a Coup d'Etat
- World Cinema Documentary Special Jury Award: Craft – Nocturnes
- NEXT Special Jury Award – Desire Lines
- Short Film Special Jury Prize for Directing – Masha Ko for The Looming
- Short Film Special Jury Prize for Directing – Makoto Nagahisa for Pisko the Crab Child is in Love

=== Short Film Jury Awards ===
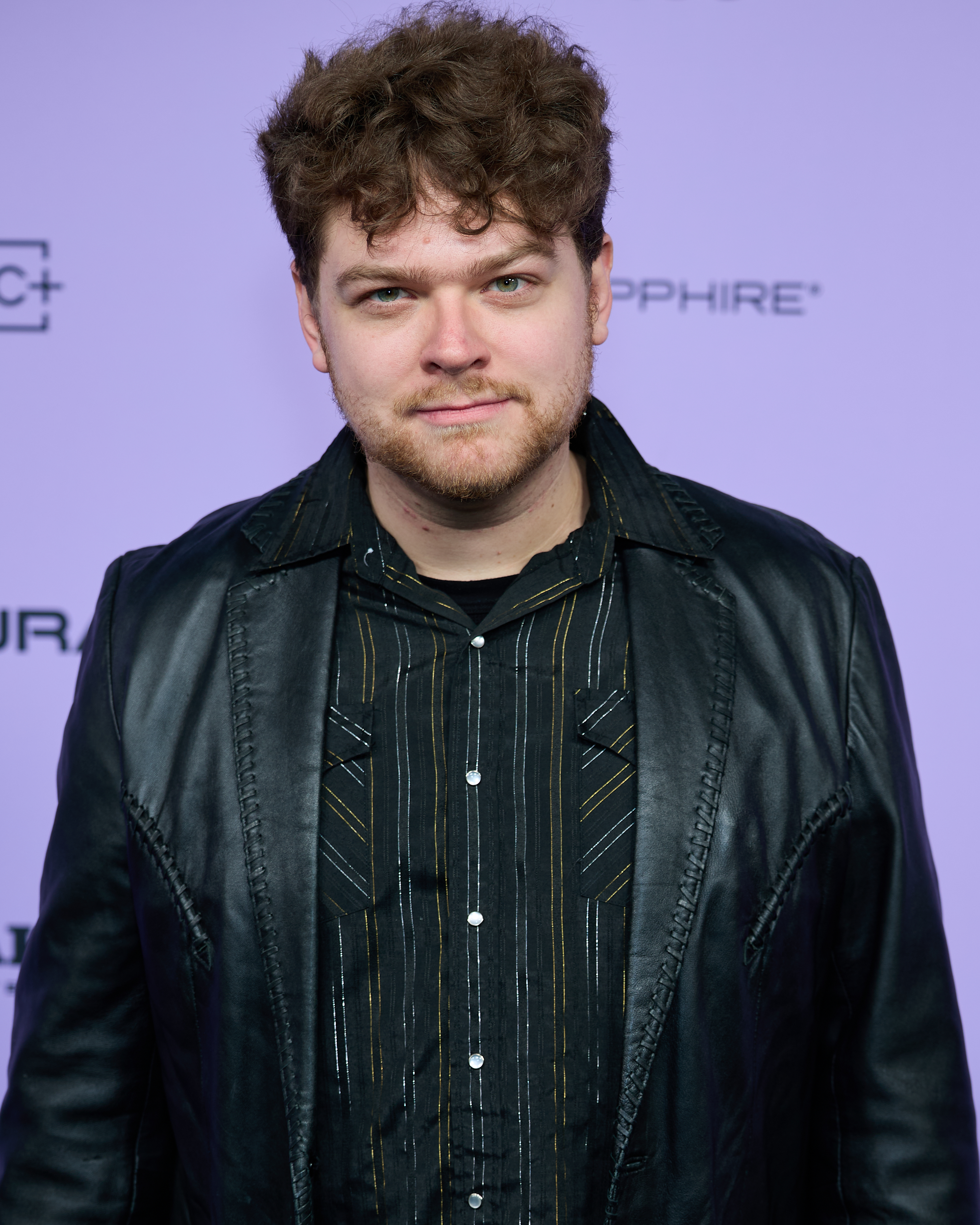
Jack Dunphy, Director of Bob's Funeral

- U.S. Fiction: Say Hi After You Die (Kate Jean Hollowell)
- International Fiction: The Stag (An Chu)
- Nonfiction: Bob's Funeral (Jack Dunphy)
- Animation: Bug Diner (Phoebe Jane Hart)

=== Sundance Institute Awards ===
- NHK Award: Saim Sadiq for We Are Never Going to Die
- Adobe Mentorship Award for Fiction: Pamela Martin
- Adobe Mentorship Award for Nonfiction: Kristina Motwani
- Amazon MGM Studios Producers Award for Fiction: Brad Becker-Parton for Stress Positions
- Amazon MGM Studios Producers Award for Nonfiction: Toni Kamau for The Battle for Laikipia
- Alfred P. Sloan Feature Film Prize: Love Me

== Acquisitions ==
- Kneecap: Sony Pictures Classics
- Ibelin: Netflix
- A Real Pain: Searchlight Pictures
- It's What's Inside: Netflix
- Presence: Neon
- Ghostlight: IFC Films and Sapan Studios
- My Old Ass: Amazon MGM Studios
- Super/Man: The Christopher Reeve Story: Warner Bros. Discovery (under DC Studios, Warner Bros. Pictures, HBO, CNN Films and Max)
- Skywalkers: A Love Story: Netflix
- Thelma: Magnolia Pictures
- Dìdi: Focus Features
- Daughters: Netflix
- Will & Harper: Netflix
- Between the Temples: Sony Pictures Classics
- Good One: Metrograph Pictures
- Sugarcane: National Geographic Documentary Films
- Sebastian: Kino Lorber
- Your Monster: Vertical
- Girls Will Be Girls: Juno Films
- Never Look Away: Greenwich Entertainment
- Exhibiting Forgiveness: Roadside Attractions
- Winner: Vertical
- Black Box Diaries: MTV Documentary Films
- Love Me: Bleecker Street and ShivHans Pictures
- Luther: Never Too Much: CNN Films and Oprah Winfrey Network
- Soundtrack to a Coup d'Etat: Kino Lorber
- Agent of Happiness: Film Movement
- Rob Peace: Republic Pictures
- In the Summers: Music Box Films
- The Outrun: Sony Pictures Classics and Stage 6 Films
- The Moogai: Samuel Goldwyn Films
- Junk: Mubi

== Gallery ==
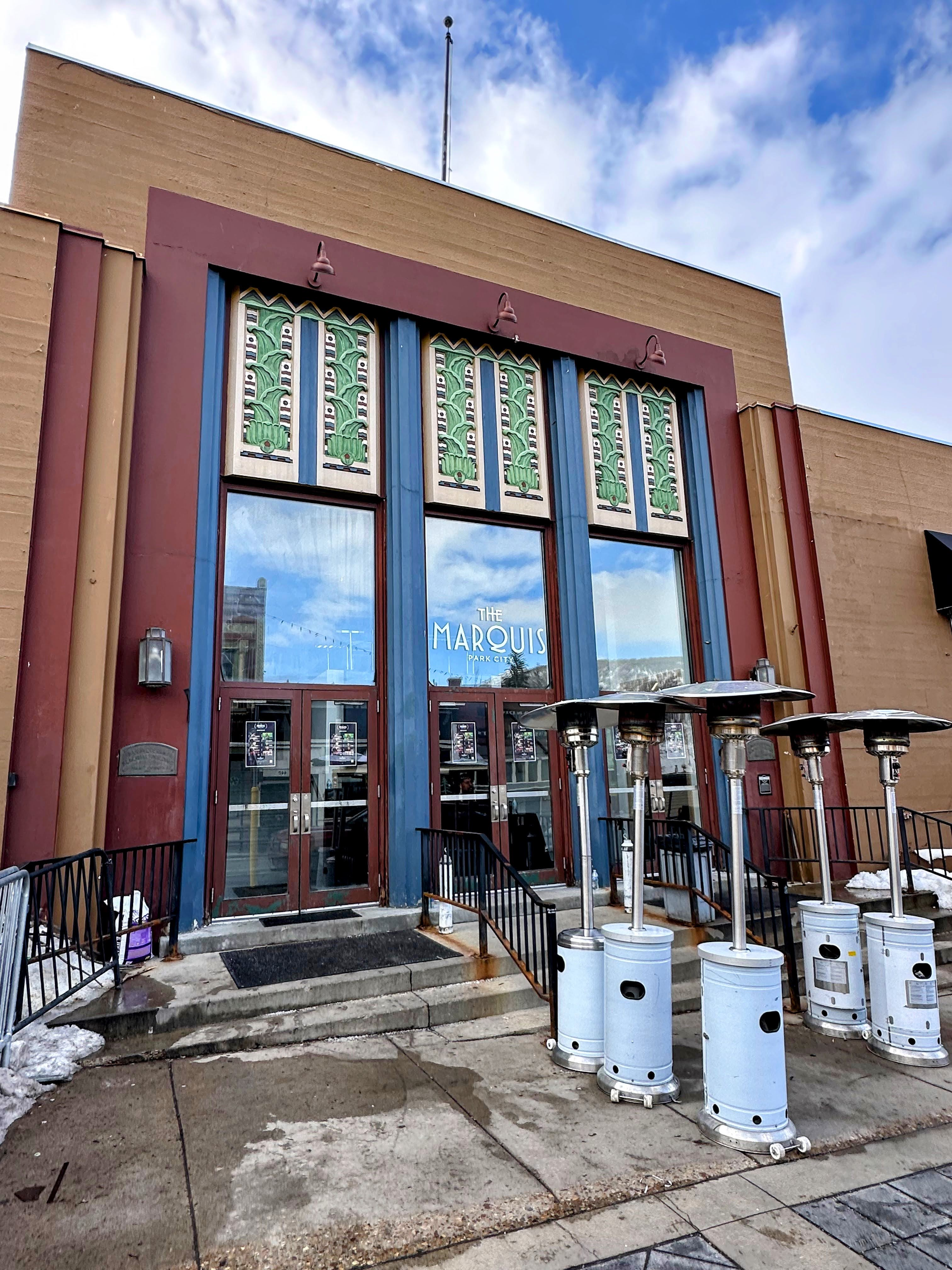
The Marquis

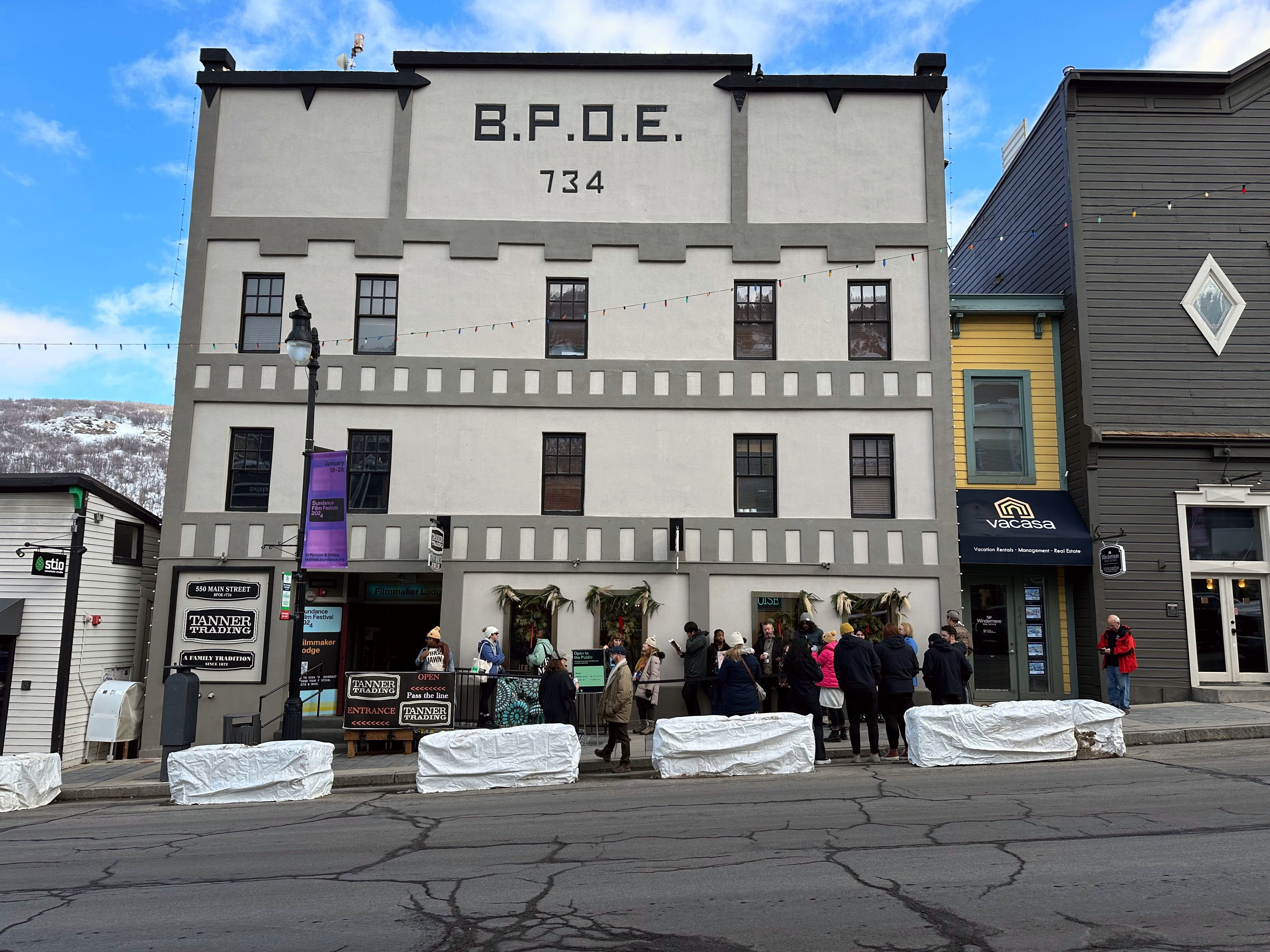
Filmmaker Lodge

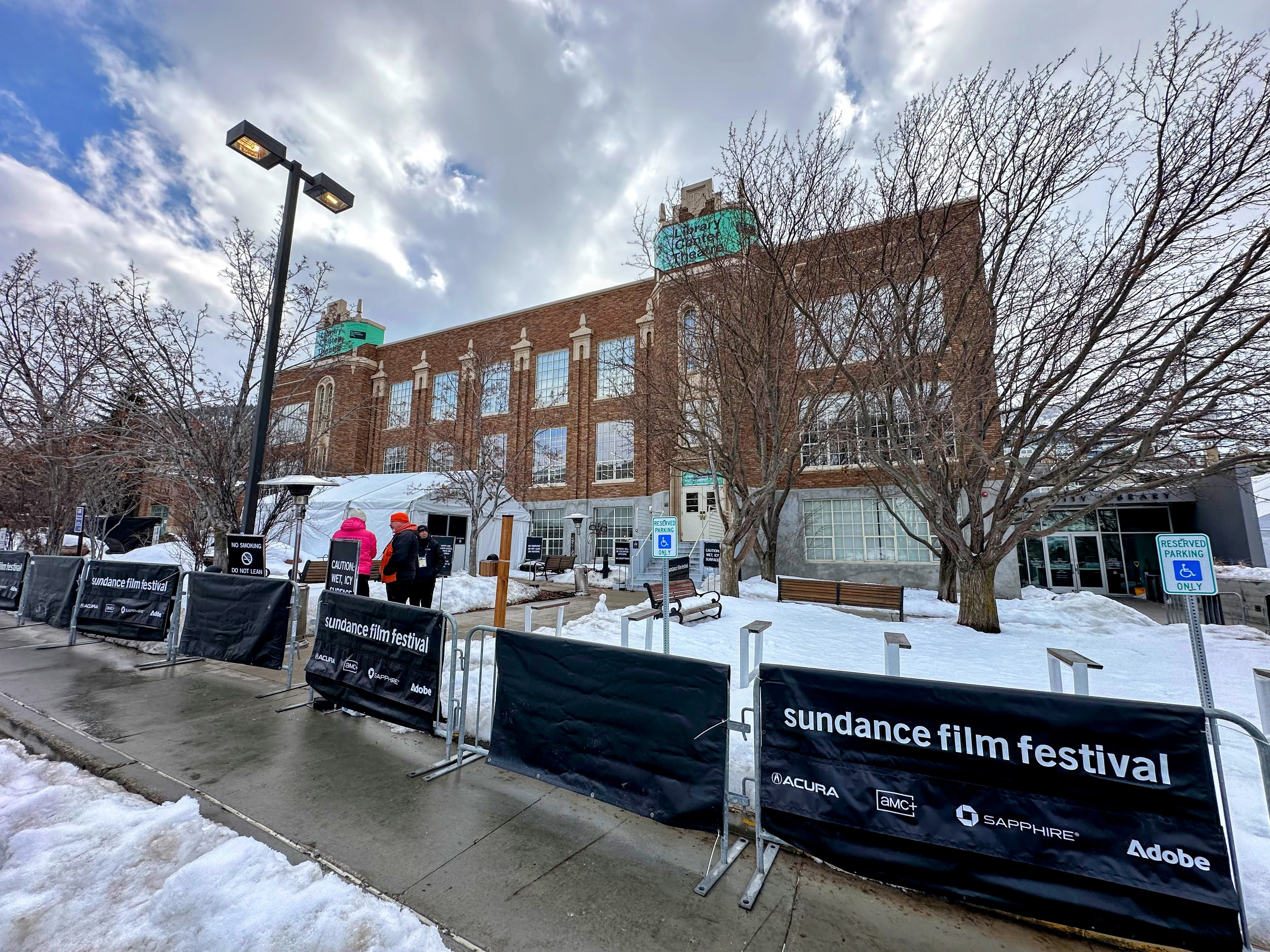
Library Center Theatre

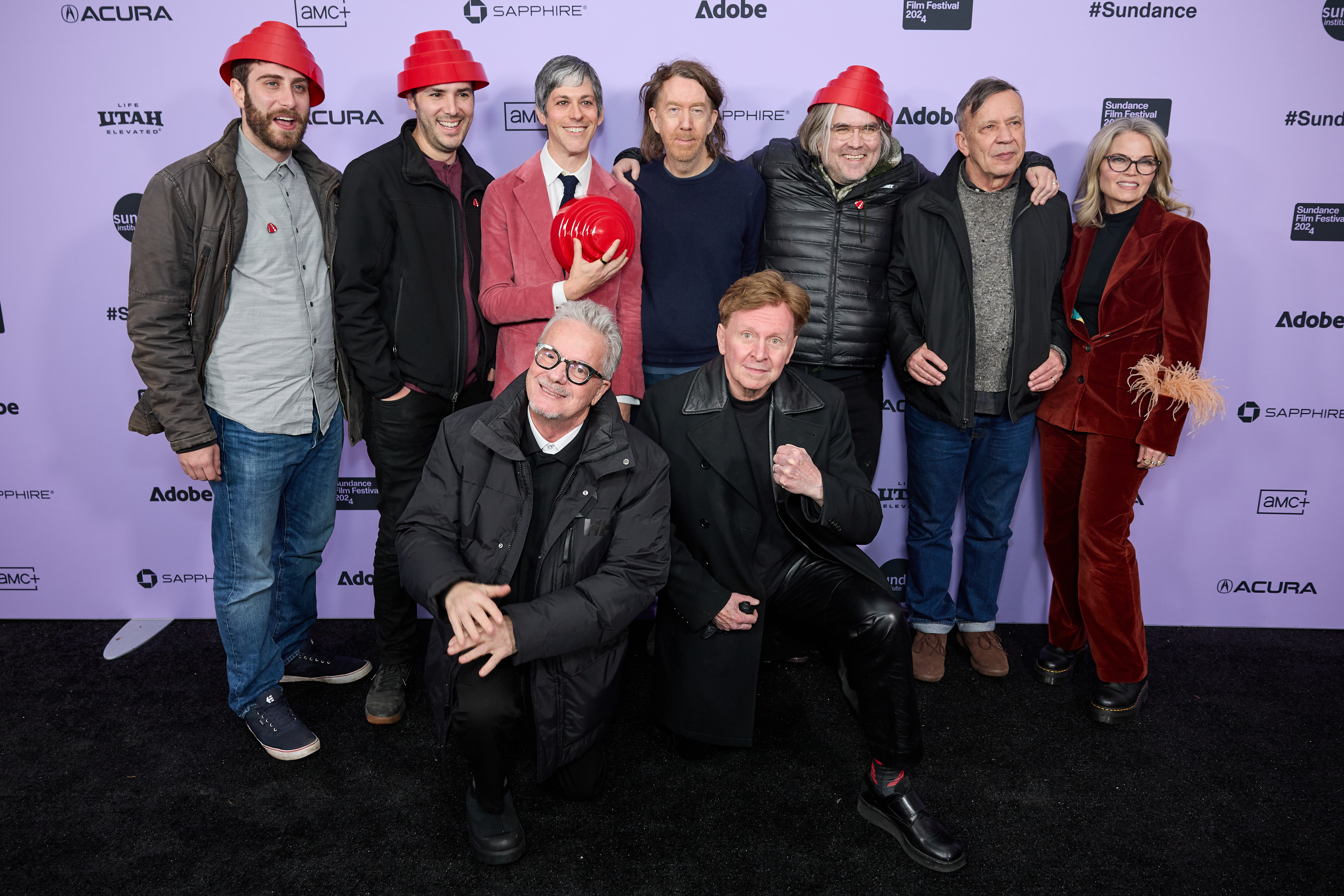
Cast and crew of the Devo documentary

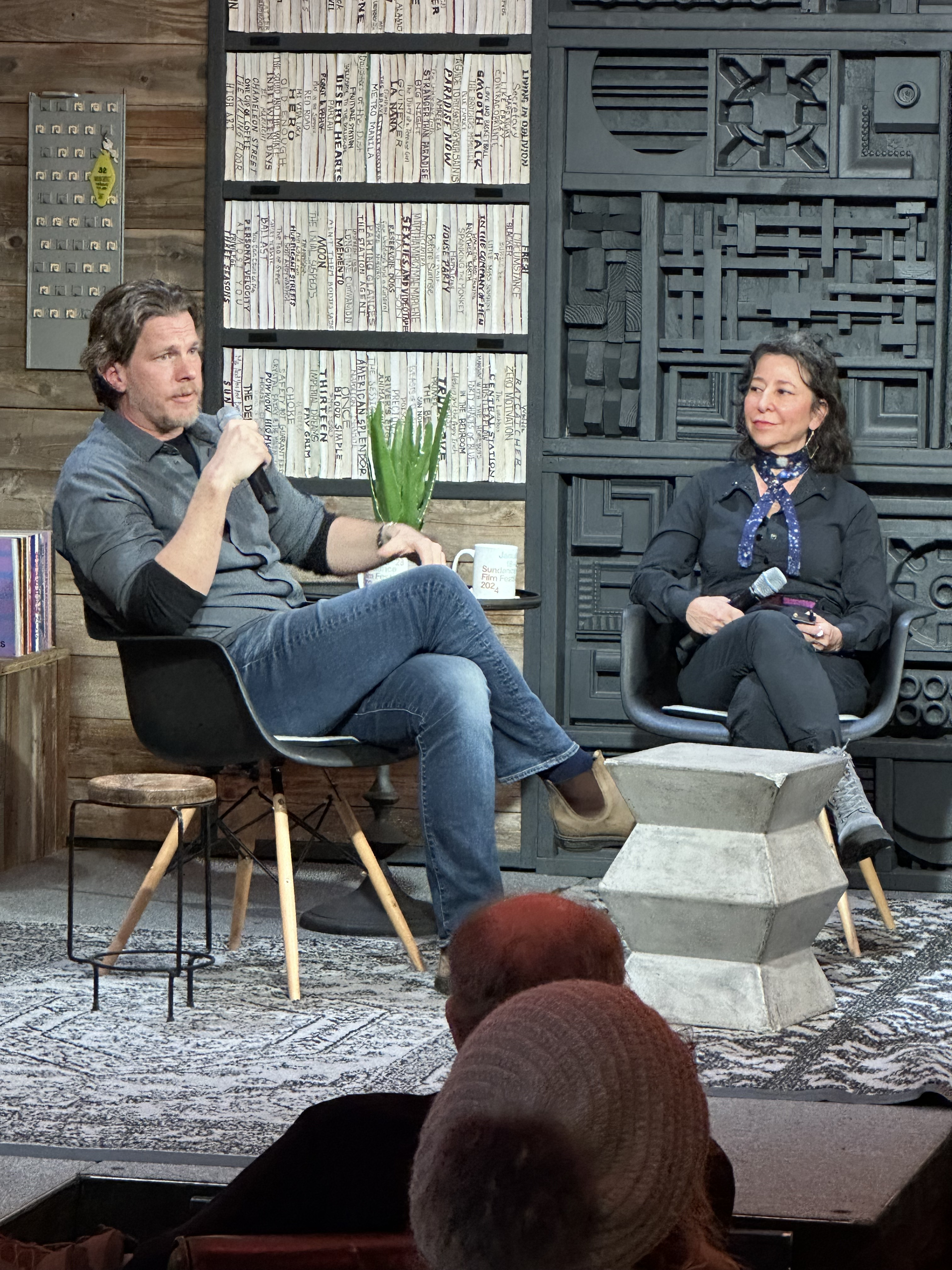
Film writer and producer Jonathan Nolan interviewed by astrophysics professor Janna Levin

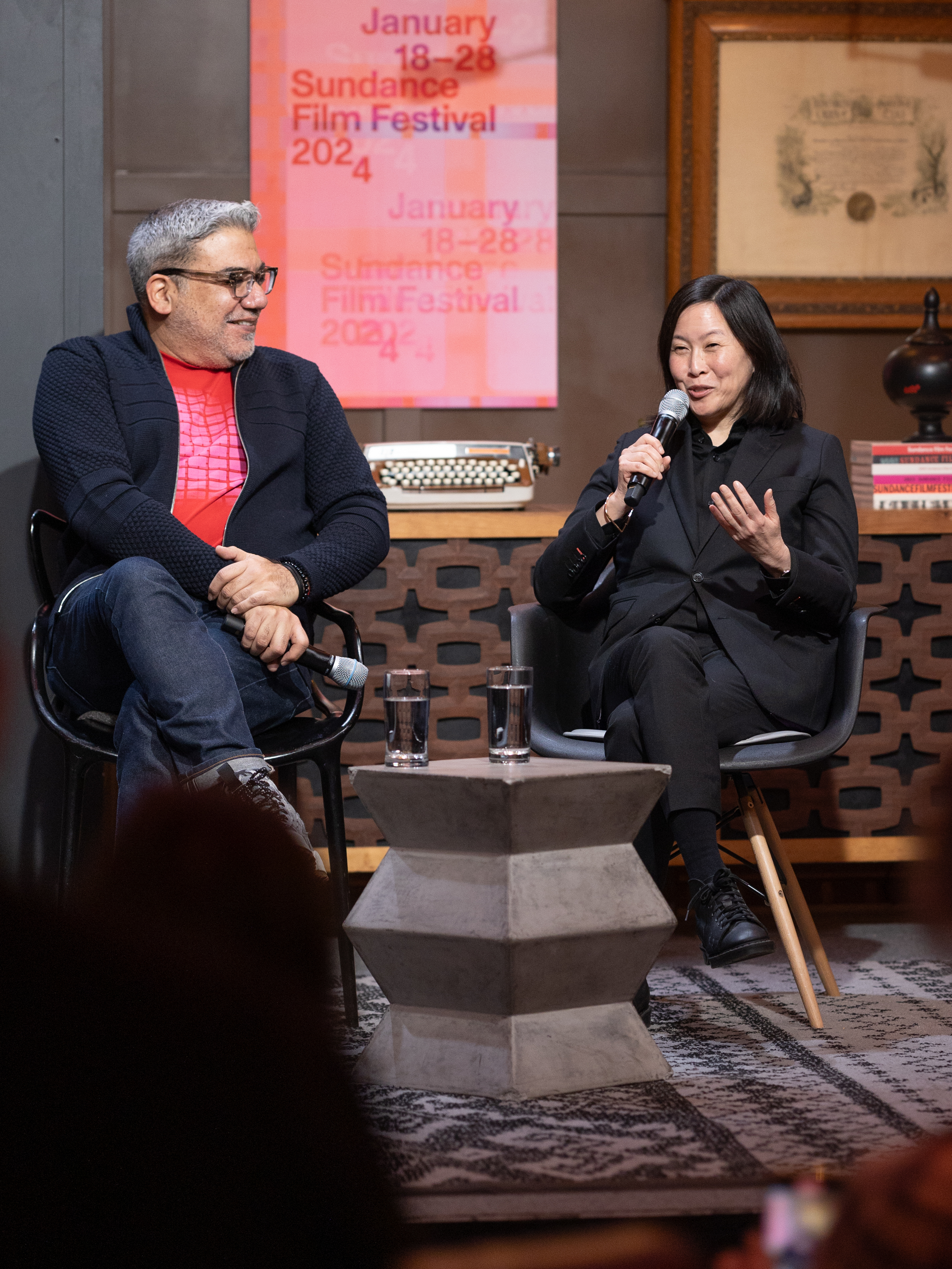
Kim Yutani, Director of Programming, at the opening press conference
