= The Painter and the Thief =

Documentary film

- Official poster
- Directed by: Benjamin Ree
- Produced by: Ingvil Giske
- Starring: Barbora Kysilkova; Karl-Bertil Nordland
- Cinematography: Kristoffer Kumar; Benjamin Ree
- Edited by: Robert Stengård
- Music by: Uno Helmersson
- Production companies: Medieoperatørene; VGTV; Tremolo Productions; Norwegian Film Institute
- Distributed by: Neon
- Release dates: January 23, 2020 (Sundance); May 22, 2020 (United States)
- Running time: 102 minutes
- Countries: United States; Norway
- Languages: English; Norwegian

The Painter and the Thief (Norwegian: Kunstneren og tyven) is a 2020 Norwegian documentary film directed by Benjamin Ree.

== Synopsis ==
The documentary film follows Barbora Kysilkova, a talented hyperrealist artist, forming a friendship with Karl-Bertil Nordland, a man convicted of stealing her work from an Oslo art gallery, spanning a period of three years.

== Cast ==
- Barbora Kysilkova
- Karl-Bertil Nordland
- Øystein Stene

== Release ==
The film premiered at the Sundance Film Festival on January 23, 2020, where it won the World Cinema Documentary Special Jury Award for Creative Storytelling.

Shortly after, Neon acquired distribution rights to the film. It was released in the United States on May 22, 2020.

== Background ==
In an interview quoted in The Guardian, director Benjamin Ree stated, “The questions I would like to explore here are: what do humans do in order to be seen and appreciated? And what it takes of us to help and see others.”

The idea for the film came when Norwegian filmmaker Benjamin Ree read news reports about the robbery of two large oil paintings from Oslo’s Galleri Nobe, in 2015. He contacted the artist, Barbora Kysilkova, a Czech now living in Norway, and began documenting her reaction to the theft of her artwork, two paintings entitled Chloe & Emma and Swan Song. It took a while to convince Karl-Bertil Nordland to participate, and Ree began filming both of them together on the fourth time they met.

The film started as a short documentary with the filmmakers not knowing what would happen, where the story would go. It was decided to make it a feature film after seeing Nordland's moving first reaction to his portrait by Kysilkova. It was filmed from 2016 to 2019.

The archival footage in the documentary was mostly contributed by a friend of Kysilkova, who had been filming the artist since 2014, including stills and video from the making of the two paintings later stolen. The friend was also at the exhibition, and she participated in the trial. The featured courtroom proceedings are genuine; Kysilkova, unfamiliar with the Norwegian language, had taken a hidden audio recorder to obtain a copy of the trial for translation afterwards. Inadvertently left running, the tape had also captured Kysilkova and Nordland's first meeting — seeking to redress the loss felt from her work being stolen, and “a sort of obligation to continue the story”, the artist had approached the accused during a break to suggest that he be a subject for her future painting. Kysilkova was also intrigued as to why anyone would steal her relatively unknown work, and Nordland's answer of “Because they were beautiful” piqued her curiosity. The film also uses the actual CCTV footage of the robbery, which was the main evidence in the trial.

Kysilkova spoke English in the film, as she didn't understand Norwegian.

Ree stated, “For me, filmmaking is about asking intellectually stimulating and emotionally engaging questions through observing human behaviour. That’s why I’ve made a movie that asks the complex questions around such a unique and complex relationship as Barbora and Karl-Bertil.” Ree chose to present the film in an unconventional structure: "I wanted a film that tries something new that I haven’t seen in this kind of observational documentary before". "First of all, dramaturgy in a documentary is not only an artistic choice, it’s also an ethical choice. The impression the audience gets of Barbora and Karl Bertil is something they have to live with for the rest of their lives. I really wanted to portray Bertil as charismatic, intelligent, dark and funny, to really show his complexity and get to know him. I thought the only way to do that was to show the world from his point of view. How you portray people in a documentary is closely connected to the ethics of it".

== Critical reception ==
The Painter and the Thief received positive reviews from film critics, mainly for its direction, story, structure and emotional weight. It holds a 'fresh' 96% approval rating on review aggregator website Rotten Tomatoes, based on 110 critic reviews, with an average of 8.1/10. The site's critical consensus reads, "The Painter and the Thief uses the unlikely bond between a criminal and his victim as the canvas for a compelling portrait of compassion and forgiveness." On Metacritic, the film is currently assigned a weighted average score of 79 out of 100, based on 33 critic reviews, indicating "generally favorable reviews".

Cath Clarke from The Guardian awarded the film 4 stars out of 5, describing it as "astonishing, emotionally electric" and writing, "What an engrossing film – and the gender reversal of a male muse inspiring a female painter has got to be one small step for art-world equality," while Adrian Horton called the film a "remarkable documentary" that "plays more like a twisting narrative film than real-life portrait."

In his review, Nick Schager from The Daily Beast describes the story as "a true-crime tale reconfigured into a unique relationship saga, replete with twists, turns, heartbreak, failure and redemption that’s as surprising as it is well-earned." He also praised the film's ending as "unbelievably unexpected, poignant, and altogether perfect."

Peter Debruge wrote for Variety magazine that its direction and editing "don’t give us all the information we might need to form a clear understanding of their subjects’ actions, yet their approach is not only more artistic but somehow more representative of real life", also noting its "time-bending nonlinear structure and various sleight-of-hand techniques to deliver information when it’s most effective."

Paul Byrnes wrote in his review for The Sydney Morning Herald, "The level of trust required to allow a filmmaker to document their lives is in itself moving, but it mirrors the relationship they have with each other," adding that "The slow revelation of [Barbora's] pain makes clear just how artful Ree’s work on structure has been in this achingly beautiful true story."

Brian Tallerico from RogerEbert.com awarded The Painter and the Thief 3 stars out of 4, writing that it "illuminates a great deal about the human condition" and that some sequences "are going to stick with me for a long time." He added, "Ree has a very cinematic language, shooting long shots down hallways, trailing his subjects like a French New Wave director would follow his fictional creations down a sidewalk." However, he felt that the film "does kind of fizzle out in the third act ... I was hoping for something to take the film to the next level in the final section, but the opposite almost happens. A question that feels like it should have been asked long before is saved for the 'climax', and I was reminded of the construction of the film in a negative way."

Writing for the magazine Little White Lies, Leila Latif commended the director for tackling the film's themes "with gentle curiosity, never pushing the subjects to probe this dynamic too forcefully, but rather allowing it to slowly unveil itself."

David Ehrlich from IndieWire gave the film the grade B−, calling it a "a tender psychosexual tale of art and ownership" and a "nuanced and beguiling new documentary about the various things we all take from each other." He also wrote, "Ree doesn’t pat himself on the back for his efforts to humanize both of his title characters. Instead, The Painter and the Thief recognizes how art — ostensibly, empathetic art most of all — has a nasty habit of flattening its subject in order to fulfill its audience, and the film does what it can to complicate the privileged gaze of looking at someone like they can’t look at you back."

== Awards ==
The film won the World Cinema Documentary Special Jury Award for Creative Storytelling in the 2020 Sundance Film Festival, the Golden Firebird Award at Hong Kong International Film Festival and the Audience Award at London Film Festival.

== Best-of lists ==
The Painter and the Thief was ranked as the best documentary film of 2020 by the BBC, The Washington Post, and The Boston Globe.
