= Globe International Silent Film Festival =

The Globe International Silent Film Festival (GISFF)
- Current: 5th globe awards
- Awarded for: Excellence in Non-verbal film
- First award: 2015; 11 years ago
- Website: gisff.com

The Globe International Silent Film Festival (GISFF) is an annual event focusing on image and non-verbal cinema which takes place in a reputable university or academic environment every year and is a platform for showcasing and judging films from filmmakers who are active in this field. Considering the festivals policies regarding different academic environments each year as a host, the date of the festival may vary from February to April.

== History ==
The festival began its second year in a global scale with the approach to extend its worldwide cultural activities, and collaborated, in an independent fashion, with other universities and academic institutions. The second year of the festival was hosted by Michigan State University. That year – same as the last edition – the festival received films in the four categories of Fiction, Documentary, Animation and experimental. The 2nd year of the Globe International Silent Film Festival was directed by Raha Amirfazli

The third edition of the festival was held in 2018, being hosted by the University of Wisconsin-Madison. Also being directed by Raha Amirfazli that year, the festival received short non-verbal films in five categories of Fiction, Documentary, Animation, Experimental and Super short (under 3 minutes).

The Fifth edition of the festival was canceled because of the COVID-19 Pandemic. Nastaran Dorgaraei the director of the festival decided to announce nominees and winners online. The festival received short non-verbal films in four categories of Fiction, Animation, Documentary, and Experimental.

== Silent Film Week ==
A side project of the festival is the festival's Silent Film Week. This event takes place a week before or at the same time with the screenings of the competition section of the festival, and includes a week's screening of the leading and distinguished films of this field from the history of cinema.

The focus of the first year's film week of the festival was on the films of Victor Sjöström. However, in addition to Sjostrom's films, films of other directors such as Yasujirō Ozu, Fritz Lang, Mauritz Stiller, Carl Theodor Dreyer, Robert Wiene, and Karlheinz Martin, as well as short Avant-garde and experimental films were shown in collaboration with the Tehran Museum of Contemporary Art.

The second Silent Film Week was held in Michigan State University focusing on the works of Carl Theodor Dreyer.

The third edition of the Film week was held in The Tehran University of Art, Faculty of Cinema and Theater, screening non-verbal films from modern and silent era directors such as Marshall Neilman, Josef von Sternberg, Edward Sedgwick, Godfrey Reggio, Michael Dudok de Wit and King Vidor.

== The Globe Community of Silent Filmmakers ==
The Globe Community of Silent Filmmakers (The GlobeCSF) was founded in 2016 by Pouria Mousavi with the goal to build a strong connection between silent filmmakers around the world, as well as to create a platform for producing and supporting short-film making, and will shortly end its first official year of activity by middle of 2017. In order to achieve this goal, the primary links are the directors, screenwriters and producers present in The Globe International Silent Film Festival (GISFF). First and foremost, the goal of the Globe Community of Silent Filmmakers is to create a platform through which the filmmakers, producers, and screenwriters of the films present in previous editions of the Globe International Silent Film Festival can communicate with each other.

The membership body of the Globe Community of Silent Filmmakers is made up filmmakers, producers, and screenwriters from 10 different countries. Part of the duty to the members of the Community of Silent Filmmakers is to promote their professional endeavors, in order for the audience of short films – especially in Iran – to get to know them better. To introduce the work of the silent filmmakers who are members of the community, the community has arranges special screenings and events.

The members of the Community of Silent Filmmakers are held in high esteem. As a result, the members of this family, in addition to viewing the entries of the Globe Community of Silent Filmmakers every year, will choose the winner of the creativity award.

This community took part, with extreme selectiveness, in the production and distribution of two short films, “Lunch Time” and “Madness”. The short film Lunch Time, produced and directed by Alireza Ghasemi and a production of the GlobeCSF has so far been nominated the short film competition in the 70th Cannes Film Festival.

== Awards ==
- Best Fiction Film
- Best Documentary Film
- Best Animation Film
- Best Experimental Film
- Best Super Short Film
- Best Director
- Best Script
- Special Jury Award
- Special Audience Award
- The Creativity Award
- The Secretary's choice

== Winners of the previous editions ==
5th Edition
| Section | Winner |
|---|---|
| Best Fiction Film | “Pure” by Jędrzej Ziembiński |
| Best Animation Film | “Bloeistraat 11” by Nienke DEUTZ |
| Best Experimental Film | “Wishing Well” by Sylvia Schedelbauer |
| Best Documentary Film | “Slow and Sluggish” by Delavar Doustanian |
| Best Script Award | “Doffice” by David Leclercq |
| Best Director Award | “Ouroboros” by Emma Keehan |
| Special Jury Award | “Wet Graveyard ” by Maryam Yavari and “When We Swim” by “Portlynn Tagavi” |
| Special Creativity Award | “Symbiosis” by Paul Raillard |

3rd edition
| section | winner |
|---|---|
| Best Fiction Film | “Animal” directed by Bahman and Bahram Ark |
| Best Animation Film | “Clouds” Directed by Diego Maclean |
| Best Experimental Film | “Phantom Cinema” directed by Li-ming Cheng |
| Best Documentary Film | “Sub Terrae” directed by Nayra Sanz Fuentes |
| Best Super Short Film | “Nursed Back” directed by Dani Pearce |
| Best Director Award | “Travelers in the night directed by Ena Sendijarevic |
| Best Script Award | “Travelers in the night directed by Ena Sendijarevic |
| Special Jury Award | “Do you like me now?” directed by Chris Shimojima |
| Special Creativity Award | “Chase” directed by Paraic Mc Gloughlin |

2nd edition
| section | winner | candidates |
|---|---|---|
| Best Fiction film | Fishy Story | Fishy Story directed by Aleksandra Szymanska; Villa Mnemosine directed by Ruben Salazar; The Preparation directed by Giorgi Tsilosani; Hunting Day directed by Ivo Skansti?; Copy Shop directed by Virgil Widrich |
| Best Experimental film | Oneiria | Light Study directed by Josephine Massarella; Passenger Fantasy directed by Neil Needleman; Oneiria directed by Jeroen Cluckers |
| Best Animation film | SWITCHMAN | We are the immigrants directed by Cataline Matamoros; Pain directed by Nadya Fedotova; Dream directed by Golnaz Moghaddam; Switchman directed by Mehdi Khoramian; Once upon a line directed by Alicja Jasina |
| Best Documentary film | Object | Sotto directed by Ina Ferlan; Object directed by Paulina Skibinska; All seasons become one directed by Shannon Michael Terry |
| Best Screenplay | | Copy Shop directed by Virgil Widrich; The Child directed by Valeria Valentina Bolivar; Fishy Story directed by Aleksandra Szymanska |
| Best Directing | The Preparation | |
| Special Jury Award | “Copy Shop” and “Once Upon a line” | |
| Creativity Award (CSF) | Object | |

1st edition

National section
| section | winner | candidates |
|---|---|---|
| Best documentary | Dar Panahe Baloot | "Shabankaran" by Amirmohammad Kharazmi; "Dar Panahe Baloot" by Mehdi Noormohammadi |
| Best Fiction | goes to all three candidates | "Tehran,Khaaniabad,1366" by Emad Hosseini; "Tanazo" by Masoud Hatami; "6:05" by Shohreh Raayati |
| Best Animation | Sandman | "Ms. Flowerhead" by Sarah Tabibzadeh; "Sandman" by Mahsa Samani; "Jiring" by Alireza Nosrati; "Dokhtarake At Ashghali" by Mohammad Zare and Shalaleh Kheiri; "Why not should you kill a bug?" by Farhad Alizadeh |
| Special Jury Award | "Ms. Flowerhead" by Sarah Tabibzadeh and "Shabankaran" by Amirmohammad Kharazmi | |
| Best Editing | Farshad Abbasi and Meysam Raazfar for "6:05" | Hamid Najafi Rad for "Tanazo"; Mehdi Moazenian for "Shabankaran"; F arshad Abbasi and Meysam Raazfar for "6:05" |
| Best Cinematography | Arash Foyouzi for "Faraz" | Mohammad Haddadi for "Tanazo"; Mehdi Noormohammadi for "Dar panahe baloot"; Sadegh Zanganeh for "Shabankaran"; Arash Foyouzi for "Faraz" |
| Best Directing | Masoud Hatami for "Tanazo" | Shohreh Raayati for "6:05"; Emad Hosseini for "Tehran,Khaamiabad,1366"; Masoud Hatami for "Tanazo" |
| Secretary's choice | "Syncronocity" directed by Mohammadreza Rahimpour | |
| Special Audience award | "Stripy" directed by Babak and Behnood Nekouee | |

International Section
| section | winner | candidates |
|---|---|---|
| Best Editing | walk in frames | walk in frames; duellum |
| Best Cinematography | lost village | lost village; all there is |
| Best Animation | "Blood money" and "Gans" | birdy wouaf wouaf; electro fly; gans; blood money; autumn leaves; one day in July |
| Special Jury Award | autumn leaves | |
| Best Documentary | "this is joe" and "to be born" | to be born; touch of freedom; this is joe; the breath of thundra |
| Best Fiction | 5:55 | 5:55; puzzle; my awesome sonorous life; interval; duellum; lost village |
| Best Experimental | Chamber Music | focus on infinity; walk in frames; the loops of emptiness; chamber music; displacement |
| Secretary's Choice | focus on infinity | |
| Special Audience Award | "dinner for few" and "toxic tale" | |
