= The Remarkable Life of Ibelin =

2024 documentary film directed by Benjamin Ree

- Netflix release poster
- Directed by: Benjamin Ree
- Produced by: Ingvil Giske
- Cinematography: Rasmus Tukia; Tore Vollan
- Edited by: Robert Stengård
- Music by: Uno Helmersson
- Distributed by: Netflix
- Release date: January 19, 2024 (Sundance)
- Running time: 104 minutes
- Country: Norway
- Languages: English; Norwegian (Note: With some dialogue in Danish.)

The Remarkable Life of Ibelin is a 2024 Norwegian documentary film directed by Benjamin Ree. The film premiered, under its original title Ibelin, on 19 January 2024 at the Sundance Film Festival where it won two awards in the World Documentary Competition—the Audience Award and the Directing Award. The film also won a Peabody Award at the 85th Annual Peabody Awards.

== Synopsis ==
Mats Steen, a Norwegian man born with Duchenne muscular dystrophy, becomes increasingly unable to participate in everyday activities. As a result, he spends most of his time playing video games, particularly World of Warcraft. His parents worry that he will miss out on life, unaware of what he does in the game.

Towards the end of his life, he starts to blog about living with the disease. When he dies at the age of 25, he leaves behind his password. His family uses the blog to announce his death, leading to various replies from his friends. The film tells the story of his life in the World of Warcraft guild Starlight—where he played the character Ibelin Redmoore—through animations based on the game, interspersed with retrospectives from his guild members, family, and excerpts from his blog. As Ibelin, Steen kept his identity and medical condition a secret, worried that other guild members would treat him differently if they knew. He refused to communicate outside text chat, but he still developed close relationships with other guild members. He was perceived as a reliable friend with whom they could share their problems.

Steen's condition worsened over time and it became harder for him to play the game. He appears more agitated, causing drama with his relationships in the guild and eventually he lashes out at a guild member. As his condition deteriorates, he develops severe breathing difficulties and has to be hospitalised. The guild member he lashed out at becomes concerned regarding Steen's absence and confronts him about it. Steen notifies them of his condition and expresses fear of others' reactions. The friend encourages him to tell the other guild members and he decides to apologise to the guild about his previous behaviour, later sharing his blog.

Eventually, Steen dies from muscular dystrophy. Five guild members from abroad attend his funeral in Oslo. The rest gather in the game which becomes a yearly tradition. The film ends with a shot of his gravestone, which reads Mats "Ibelin" Steen.

== Production ==
Benjamin Ree, the director of the film, first read about Mats Steen in a 2019 NRK article about Steen's life. After learning that his family had recorded home movies throughout Steen's life, Ree reached out to them about making a film. Steen was a member of a guild in World of Warcraft named Starlight, which had logged 42,000 pages of their text chats in the game. Ree was able to retrieve about 4,000 pages for the script.

Ree was researching, looking for ways to visualise Starlight's text chats when he discovered an animation studio ran by Rasmus Tukia and hired Tukia as an animator. Tukia had previously posted his fan-made World of Warcraft machinimas on YouTube. Most of the film's game animations were made and edited by Tukia using assets from World of Warcraft, but he collaborated with two other animators on "background characters, rigging and rendering".

World of Warcraft is created and owned by Blizzard Entertainment in Irvine, California. Ree and the producer, Ingvil Giske, did not contact them until three years into production, when the film was nearly finished. They were invited to screen the film at Blizzard's office, where they were given permission to "use whatever [they] need[ed]". In July 2023, before the film premiered, Blizzard added a replica of Steen's gravestone to World of Warcraft.

== Release ==
Ibelin premiered on 19 January 2024 in the World Documentary Competition at the 2024 Sundance Film Festival in Park City, Utah, where it won 2 awards, the Audience Award: World Cinema Documentary and The Directing Award: World Cinema Documentary. Shortly after, Netflix acquired distribution rights to the film. The film screened at festivals such as the Chicago Critics Film Festival in May and the New Zealand International Film Festival in August, with the title expanded to The Remarkable Life of Ibelin. It was selected for the MAMI Mumbai Film Festival 2024 in Mumbai under the World Cinema section.

== Reception ==
=== Critical response ===
On the review aggregator website Rotten Tomatoes, 97% of 59 critics' reviews are positive, with an average rating of 8/10. Metacritic, which uses a weighted average, assigned the film a score of 78 out of 100, based on 17 critics, indicating "generally favorable" reviews. Variety commended the film: "It's a world unto itself, and a glowing example of how moviemaking—like a person's digital footprint—can be a form of immortality that soothes even the most devastating loss." Other reviews were extremely positive. Cineeuropa found that Ree "ends up with a film that's not about death; rather, it's about friendship, love and life."

=== Accolades ===
| Award | Date | Category | Recipient(s) | Result | Ref. |
|---|---|---|---|---|---|
| Sundance Film Festival | 28 January 2024 | World Cinema Documentary – Grand Jury Prize | The Remarkable Life of Ibelin | Nominated | |
| Sundance Film Festival | 28 January 2024 | World Cinema Documentary – Audience Award | The Remarkable Life of Ibelin | Won | |
| Sundance Film Festival | 28 January 2024 | World Cinema Documentary – Directing | Benjamin Ree | Won | |
| Amanda Awards | 23 August 2024 | Best Film | Benjamin Ree and Ingvil Giske | Won | |
| Amanda Awards | 23 August 2024 | Best Documentary Film | Benjamin Ree and Ingvil Giske | Nominated | |
| Amanda Awards | 23 August 2024 | Best Director | Benjamin Ree | Nominated | |
| Amanda Awards | 23 August 2024 | Best Editing | Robert Stengård | Won | |
| Amanda Awards | 23 August 2024 | Best Visual Effects | Rasmus Tukia, Ada Wikdahl, Chris Kongshaug, Derek Bancroft, Sindre Hammersbøen, and Arash Ebrahimi | Nominated | |
| Zurich Film Festival | 13 October 2024 | Best International Documentary Film | The Remarkable Life of Ibelin | Nominated | |
| Critics' Choice Documentary Awards | 10 November 2024 | Best Documentary Feature | The Remarkable Life of Ibelin | Nominated | |
| Critics' Choice Documentary Awards | 10 November 2024 | Best Biographical Documentary | The Remarkable Life of Ibelin | Nominated | |
| Critics' Choice Documentary Awards | 10 November 2024 | Best Director | Benjamin Ree | Nominated | |
| Critics' Choice Documentary Awards | 10 November 2024 | Best Score | Uno Helmersson | Nominated | |
| Critics' Choice Documentary Awards | 10 November 2024 | Best Editing | Robert Stengård | Nominated | |
| International Documentary Association Awards | 5 December 2024 | Best Feature Documentary | Benjamin Ree and Ingvil Giske | Nominated | |
| International Documentary Association Awards | 5 December 2024 | Best Original Music Score | Uno Helmersson | Nominated | |
| European Film Awards | 7 December 2024 | European Young Audience Award | The Remarkable Life of Ibelin | Won | |
| Astra Film Awards | 8 December 2024 | Best Documentary Feature | The Remarkable Life of Ibelin | Nominated | |
| Austin Film Critics Association | 6 January 2025 | Best Documentary Film | The Remarkable Life of Ibelin | Nominated | |
| Cinema Eye Honors | 9 January 2025 | Audience Choice Prize | The Remarkable Life of Ibelin | Nominated | |
| Cinema Eye Honors | 9 January 2025 | Outstanding Visual Design | Rasmus Tukia and Ada Wikdahl | Nominated | |
| Cinema Eye Honors | 9 January 2025 | Outstanding Original Score | Uno Helmersson | Won | |
| Peabody Awards | 1 May 2025 | Documentary | Medieoperatørene and VGTV for Netflix | Won | |
| Primetime Emmy Awards | 7 September 2025 | Exceptional Merit in Documentary Filmmaking | Benjamin Ree and Ingvil Giske | Nominated | |
