= Iranian Short Film Academy awards =

Iranian Short Film Academy Awards also known as ISFA awards are an annual award held in Iran by the Iranian Short Film Association, a subset of the Iranian House of Cinema. This event was held for the first time in 2007 as the Iranian Independent Short Film Celebration during Kamal Farhang’s presidency of the Iranian Short Film Association board. Previously the best short film award was granted at the Great Celebration of Iranian Cinema Guild, but in 2007 the Iranian House of Cinema decided on eliminating the best short film, best documentary and best animation awards from the Great Celebration and requested trade unions to hold independent ceremonies in the same timeframe and grant awards in various fields to their own picks. Since then the Iranian Short Film Association has been in charge of selection and judging of the films. The director of each period is appointed by the board of Iranian Short Film Association. Amirali A’laaii, Majid Barzegar, Masoud Amini Tirani, Nima Abbaspour, Amir Touderoosta, Peyman Nahanghodrati and Armin Isarian have been the awards directors as of 2020. Due to selection and judging through the short film union members’ votes and independence from governmental organizations, the ISFA awards are considered one of the most credible short film award in Iran. The 11th edition will be held in spring 2021 with Alireza Ghasemi as director.

== History ==
So far, 9 out of 11 terms of ISFA awards have been organized by the ISFA Academy. ISFA Academy was founded in 2009, but since due to the Iranian election events all House of Cinema Celebrations were cancelled, it was debuted at the 3rd Independent Short Film Ceremony in 2010. Naghi Nemati, Bijan Mirbagheri, Saeed Pouresmaili, Shahram Mokri, Amirali A’laaii, Nima Abbaspour, Arash Rasafi and Majid Barzegar are the members of the board of founders of this academy. Amir A’laaii was the first ISFA academy president with Shahram Mokri being the coordination director of the same year’s short film ceremony. ISFA Academy has upwards of 80 members and is the first jury academy founded in Iran.

The 13th edition of the Iranian Short Film Association (ISFA) film festival was banned by the Iranian authorities on July 22, 2023, after featuring Iranian actor Susan Taslimi without a hijab in the festival's publicity poster, citing a violation of the compulsory dress code in Iran.

== The ISFA Emblem Award ==
The ISFA emblem award granted every year to one of the significant figures of Iranian cinema comprises two bronze plaques inscribed with old Persian cuneiform and a Persian-mythology-inspired orb said to display the universe (Jam-e Jahan Nama). The emblem was given to Abbas Kiarostami in the 2nd term and followingly to Naser Taghvaei (2010), Rakhshan Banietemad (2011), Kianoosh Ayari (2014), Bahram Beyzaei (2015), Khosrow Sinai (2016), Amir Naderi (2017) Sohrab Shahid Saless (2018) and Parviz Kimiavi (2019). Sohrab Shahid Saless’ post-humus emblem is currently kept at the short film section of the Museum of Cinema in Tehran.
