= Preeti Panigrahi =

Indian actress

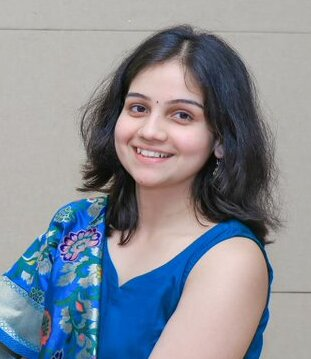
- Panigrahi in 2024
- Born: 2002 (age 23–24)
- Education: Hindu College, Delhi

Preeti Panigrahi is an Indian actress who starred in the 2024 film Girls Will Be Girls. She received the Special Jury Award for Acting at the 2024 Sundance Film Festival for her performance as a high school student navigating the complexities of adolescence and societal expectations.

== Life and career ==
Preeti Panigrahi was born in 2002 and grew up in India. She attended Hindu College, Delhi University, where she was actively involved in the theatre circuit. She is pursuing further studies in animation at SRFTI. Her passion for acting was inspired by her father's love for theatre.

Panigrahi landed the lead role of Mira in Girls Will Be Girls after responding to an open call in 2022. The audition required participants to submit a video depicting their high school persona. Drawing from her experience as the head girl in school, Preeti played the character of Mira. She prepared for the role by participating in workshops with casting director Dilip Shankar. At the Sundance Film Festival, Girls Will Be Girls won an audience award in the world cinema dramatic competition and Panigrahi's performance earned her a special jury prize. Critic Anupama Chopra wrote, "Panigrahi is the find of the year. Without a trace of strain or drama, she captures the myriad emotions coursing through Mira as she discovers passion, sexuality, unbridled rage, a twisted sort of jealousy, resentment, disappointment and eventually, comfort."

== Filmography ==
- Girls Will Be Girls (2024)

== Awards ==
Panigrahi won the Special Jury Award for Acting at the 2024 Sundance Film Festival for Girls Will Be Girls.
