= Stephen Maing =

American documentary filmmaker

- Website: stephenmaing.com

Stephen Maing is an American documentary filmmaker, cinematographer and producer. His documentary Crime and Punishment won a 2019 Emmy Award. His 2024 film Union won a 2024 Sundance Jury Award.

== Early life and education ==
Maing grew up in a large extended family, whose experiences with loss and war significantly influenced his perspective.

== Work ==
Maing's career in documentary filmmaking was influenced by filmmakers like the Maysles, Fred Wiseman and Jean Rouch. A key moment in his early twenties was when he saw a student's raw video diary of a police shootout, which deeply affected him and pushed him towards documentary filmmaking.

Maing's relationship with the Sundance Institute began in 2010 with the support for his first feature documentary, High Tech, Low Life. His film Crime + Punishment premiered at Sundance.

Stephen Maing has directed four documentaries with support from the Sundance Institute, with Union being his latest work. Union, co-directed with Brett Story, explores the efforts of the Amazon Labor Union in Staten Island, New York.

== Personal life ==
Maing resides in Brooklyn.

== Filmography ==
Credits
Year	Title	Notes
2012	High Tech, Low Life	
2015	The Surrender	
2018	Crime + Punishment	
2020	Dirty Gold	Part of Dirty Money (2018 TV series), filmed in Peru’s Amazon rainforest
2024	Union	

== Awards and recognition ==
Stephen Maing received the Courage Under Fire Award for his work on Crime + Punishment.
