= Alireza Ghasemi =

Iranian screenwriter and director

- علیرضا قاسمی
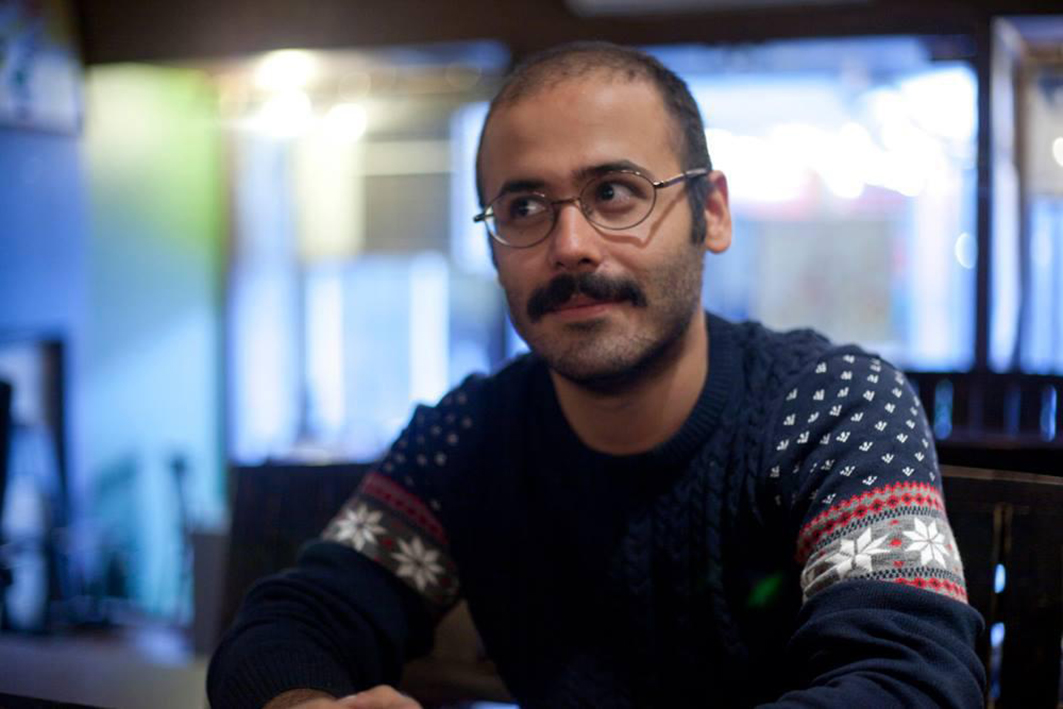
- Born: 29 October 1990 (age 36); Tehran, Iran
- Education: Art University of Tehran
- Occupation: Filmmaker

Alireza Ghasemi (Persian: علیرضا قاسمی; Born 1990) is an Iranian screenwriter, film director and producer. notably directing In the Land of Brothers, for which he won the Directing Award at the Sundance Film Festival.

== Early life and education ==
Ghasemi graduated from the Tehran University of Art, where he studied cinema, and later attended Filmakademie Baden-Württemberg in Germany. He is also an alumnus of the Cannes Cinema de demain (2018) and Berlinale Talents (2022).

== Career ==
Ghasemi first gained international recognition with his short film Lunch Time (2017), which was nominated for the Short Film Palme d’Or at the 70th Cannes Film Festival. He later directed and co-wrote several short films, including Better Than Neil Armstrong (2019), Extra Sauce (2020), and Solar Eclipse (2021). These works were screened at numerous film festivals and received critical acclaim for their innovative narratives and thematic depth.

Beyond filmmaking, Ghasemi has been actively involved in film festival organization. He served as the director of the 11th Nahal International Short Film Festival in 2014 and founded the Globe International Silent Film Festival in 2015. In 2021, he was appointed as the director of the Iranian Short Film Academy Awards (ISFA Awards), further contributing to the recognition of short films and filmmakers in Iran.

His debut feature, In the Land of Brothers (2024), premiered at the Sundance Film Festival and earned the Best Directing Award in the World Cinema Competition.

== Filmography ==
=== Feature film ===
| Year | Title | Director | Screenwriter | Producer |
|---|---|---|---|---|
| 2024 | In the Land of Brothers | Yes | Yes | Yes |

=== Short film ===
| Year | Title | Director | Screenwriter | Producer |
|---|---|---|---|---|
| 2021 | Solar Eclipse | Yes | Yes | Yes |
| 2019 | Arezo | Yes | Yes | No |
| 2019 | Extra Sauce | Yes | Yes | No |
| 2019 | Better than Neil Armstrong | Yes | Yes | No |
| 2017 | Lunch Time | Yes | Yes | Yes |
| 2016 | Frequency | Yes | Yes | Yes |
| 2015 | Shortcut | Yes | Yes | Yes |

== Awards & Recognition ==
- Directing Award – World Cinema Dramatic Competition, In the Land of Brothers – Sundance Film Festival, 2024
- Best Film, In the Land of Brothers – Saint-Jean-de-Luz International Film Festival, 2024
- Best International Feature, In the Land of Brothers – Film Fest Sundsvall, 2024
- Best Film, In the Land of Brothers – Pessac International Film Festival, 2024
- Best Film, In the Land of Brothers – Carcassonne International Film Festival, 2025
- Best Asian Film, In the Land of Brothers – Bengaluru International Film Festival, 2025
- Golden Frog Nomination – Director’s Debuts Competition, In the Land of Brothers – Camerimage, 2024
- Young Jury Award, In the Land of Brothers – Hong Kong Asian Film Festival, 2024
- Young Jury Award – Youth Jury Fiction, In the Land of Brothers – FIFDH Geneva, 2025
- Short Film Palme d’Or Nomination, Lunch Time – Cannes Film Festival, 2017
- Best Short Film, Lunch Time – Nashville Film Festival, 2017
- Best International Short Film, Better than Neil Armstrong – Pune International Film Festival (India), 2020
- Best Screenplay, Extra Sauce – Canberra Short Film Festival, 2019
- Best International Short Film, Solar Eclipse – Minimalen Short Film Festival, 2021
- Special Jury Award, Solar Eclipse – Yerevan Short Film Festival, 2021
- Best Short Film, Solar Eclipse – Kraljevski Filmski Festival, 2021
