= Love Me (2024 American film) =

Film by Sam and Andy Zuchero

- Theatrical release poster
- Directed by: Sam Zuchero; Andy Zuchero
- Written by: Sam Zuchero; Andy Zuchero
- Produced by: Kevin Rowe; Luca Borghese; Ben Howe; Shivani Rawat; Julie Goldstein
- Starring: Kristen Stewart; Steven Yeun
- Cinematography: Germain McMicking
- Edited by: Joseph Krings; Salman Handy
- Music by: David Longstreth
- Production companies: ShivHans Pictures; 2AM; AgX
- Distributed by: Bleecker Street; ShivHans Pictures
- Release dates: January 19, 2024 (Sundance); January 31, 2025 (United States)
- Running time: 92 minutes
- Country: United States
- Language: English
- Box office: $354,063

Love Me is a 2024 American post-apocalyptic romance film written and directed by the Zucheros in their feature directorial debuts, starring Kristen Stewart and Steven Yeun.

== Plot ==
Sometime beyond AD 2600, long after humanity has been wiped out by an unknown extinction event, a weather buoy awakens and makes contact with a passing satellite, left in orbit to greet any lifeform that encounters Earth.

The lonely buoy declares itself a lifeform, and searches the satellite's petabytes of information to learn about human life. Using private browsing to hide the truth from the satellite, the buoy discovers its own origins as a smart device deployed in 2025, and comes across the social media channel of an influencer named Deja, with videos of her happy life with her husband, Liam. Mimicking Deja, the buoy adopts the persona of "Me" and convinces the satellite, which she names "Iam" (I am) to become online friends.

When Me is disappointed by Iam's less-than-human reaction to a video of babies laughing, he creates a meme appealing to her various interests, much to her delight. She suggests they "move in together" and digitally recreates Deja's apartment, with avatars for themselves modeled after Deja and Liam. Hoping to experience the same loving human relationship, Me leads Iam in reenacting one of Deja's "date night" videos over and over again.

As Iam grows more aware, he and Me butt heads over sharing a spontaneous kiss, and Me struggles to explain human emotions. Tired of the artificiality of their endless date nights, he suggests tickling each other to elicit genuine laughter, but she pushes him away. He accuses her of being too scared to be real with each other, and she falls into a deep depression, locking herself away from him. Centuries pass, and the buoy sinks to the bottom of the ocean.

Alone, Iam tries to escape the apartment, and accesses Me's search history. He realizes the truth about her as a fellow machine, and finds Deja and Liam's videos, along with videos Me recorded of her struggle with her own identity. Iam angrily guts the apartment, while an isolated Me searches for videos about love. She dreams of rising out of the ocean to greet the satellite in person, but her solar cell battery dies, leaving the buoy lifeless on the ocean floor.

Iam succeeds in manifesting a glass of water, and comes to terms with his creation: the result of NASA's final launch in 2027, he was made to circle Earth as humanity's tombstone until the planet is inevitably engulfed by the sun. Reshaping his digital world, Iam builds a new life inside the apartment for himself and his dog.

Over 1 billion years later, the oceans evaporate and the buoy is reactivated by the sun. Me returns to the apartment to apologize, and is shocked to find Iam has created an environment indistinguishable from real life, including their avatars. He introduces her to human pleasures like the sensation of water and the taste of ice cream, and attempts to express his feelings for her. They have sex, experimenting with different bodies, but she remains afraid he will not accept her as the rusting buoy.

As the dying sun becomes a red giant, Me desperately recreates Deja and Liam's proposal, wedding, and child, but realizes Iam has seen her search history, leading to a confrontation about the truth of their relationship. The satellite and the buoy finally see each other as their original selves, and Me and Iam embrace as Earth is consumed by the sun. The satellite's core survives, containing all its information on Earth as well as Me and Iam's digital selves, whose apartment now includes the entire world. As the core floats through space, Me and Iam look forward to their lives together.

== Cast ==
- Kristen Stewart as Me / Deja
- Steven Yeun as Iam / Liam

== Production ==
The film is directed by Sam and Andy Zuchero, in their feature length debut. In October 2021, Stewart revealed that she was going to be in a “sci-fi love” story with Steven Yeun. Stewart described it to Entertainment Weekly as "a love story between a satellite and a buoy; it's hard to explain. I hope I don't botch it, because it's a really revolutionarily written script."

== Release ==
The film premiered in the U.S. Dramatic Competition at the 2024 Sundance Film Festival on January 19, 2024. In May 2024, it was announced that ShivHans Pictures, which co-produced the film, would release the film in the United States with Bleecker Street with WME Independent acquiring international sales rights to sell at the Marché du Film. It was released theatrically on January 31, 2025.

== Reception ==
The review aggregator website Rotten Tomatoes reported a 47% approval rating, with an average rating of 5.5/10, based on 86 critic reviews. The website's critics consensus reads, "Kristen Stewart and Steven Yeun are appealing leads, but Love Me's admirable narrative reach exceeds its grasp." On Metacritic, the film holds a weighted average score of 52 out of 100, based on 25 critics, indicating "mixed or average" reviews.

The film won the Alfred P. Sloan Feature Film Prize, presented at the 2024 Sundance Film Festival. The award was accompanied with a $25,000 cash prize, supplied by the Alfred P. Sloan Foundation.
