= Alessandra Lacorazza Samudio =

American filmmaker

- Born: Alessandra Lacorazza
- Occupation(s): Film director, screenwriter, film editor

Alessandra Lacorazza Samudio is a Colombian-American filmmaker. Her feature directorial debut, In the Summers was awarded the grand jury prize and the directing award in the U.S. Dramatic Competition at the 2024 Sundance Film Festival.

== Career ==
Lacorazza's short film Mami debuted at the 2019 Palm Springs ShortFest. The following year she was one of seven screenwriters selected for the New York Screenwriters Workshop hosted by Writers Guild of America, East and FilmNation.

In 2024, Lacorazza became the first Latina filmmaker to win the directing award in Sundance Film Festival U.S. Dramatic Competition for her feature directorial debut, In the Summers. The film was also awarded the competition's grand jury prize.

She is a member of Meerkat Media, a New York-based filmmaking collective and cooperative.

== Personal life ==
Lacorazza identifies as queer.

== Filmography ==
Year	Title	Notes	Ref.
2019	Mami	Short film	
2024	In the Summers	—	

== Awards and nominations ==
Year	Award	Category	Nominated work	Result	Ref.
2024	Sundance Film Festival	Grand Jury Prize, U.S. Dramatic Competition	In the Summers	Won	
2024	Sundance Film Festival	Director's Award, U.S. Dramatic Competition	In the Summers	Won	
