= Brett Story =

Canadian documentary filmmaker

Brett Story is a Canadian documentary filmmaker, most noted for her 2016 film The Prison in Twelve Landscapes. The film was awarded a $5,000 Special Jury Citation in the Best Canadian Feature Documentary category at the 2016 Hot Docs Canadian International Documentary Festival, was the winner of the Colin Low Award for best Canadian documentary at the 2016 DOXA Documentary Film Festival, won the award for Best Canadian Documentary at the Vancouver Film Critics Circle Awards 2016, and received a Canadian Screen Award nomination for Best Feature Length Documentary at the 5th Canadian Screen Awards in 2017.

Her 2017 short documentary film CamperForce was adapted from Jessica Bruder's book Nomadland, and influenced Chloé Zhao's 2020 film adaptation. She followed up in 2019 with The Hottest August.

In 2024, Story co-directed Union alongside Stephen T. Maing exploring the Amazon Labor Union.

She is an assistant professor in film studies at the Cinema Studies Institute, part of Innis College at the University of Toronto.

== Personal life ==
In September 2025, Story signed an open pledge with Film Workers for Palestine pledging not to work with Israeli film institutions "that are implicated in genocide and apartheid against the Palestinian people."
