= Parly (disambiguation) =

Parly is a commune in the Yonne department in north-central France.

Parly may also refer to:

- Parliament nicknamed "parly"
  - A "parly" train, or parliamentary train in the UK
- Parly (surname), and a list of people with that name
- Parly P. Pratt (1807–1857), Mormon leader
- Parly, a fictional character from the play Sir Harry Wildair
- Parly, a fictional character from the play The Constant Couple
- Parly 2 a Shopping center in Chesnay, Yvelines

== See also ==
- Parlay (disambiguation)
- Parley (disambiguation)
- Parler (disambiguation)
- Parle (disambiguation)
