= List of Sundance Film Festival award winners =

The following includes a list of films that won awards at the American Sundance Film Festival.

== 1980s ==
=== 1984 ===
- Grand Jury Prize Dramatic – Old Enough
- Grand Jury Prize Documentary – Style Wars
- Honorable Mention Documentary – Seeing Red
- Honorable Mention Documentary – The Good Fight (The Abraham Lincoln Brigade in the Spanish Civil War)
- Special Jury Prize Dramatic – Last Night at the Alamo
- Special Jury Prize Documentary – When the Mountains Tremble
- Special Jury Recognition Documentary – The Secret Agent
- Special Jury Recognition Dramatic – Hero

=== 1985 ===
- Grand Jury Prize Dramatic – Blood Simple
- Grand Jury Prize Documentary – Seventeen
- Special Jury Prize Dramatic – Almost You
- Special Jury Prize Dramatic – The Killing Floor
- Special Jury Prize Documentary – America and Lewis Hine
- Special Jury Prize Documentary – Kaddish
- Special Jury Prize Documentary – Streetwise
- Special Jury Prize Documentary – The Times of Harvey Milk
- Special Jury Recognition Dramatic – Stranger Than Paradise
- Special Jury Recognition Dramatic - The Brother from Another Planet
- Special Jury Recognition Documentary – In Heaven There Is No Beer?

=== 1986 ===
- Grand Jury Prize Dramatic – Smooth Talk
- Grand Jury Prize Documentary – Private Conversations
- Special Jury Prize Dramatic – Desert Hearts
- Special Jury Prize Documentary – The Mothers of Plaza de Mayo
- Special Jury Recognition – Parting Glances
- Special Jury Recognition – The Great Wall is a Great Wall
- Special Jury Recognition for Youth Comedy – Seven Minutes in Heaven

=== 1987 ===
- Grand Jury Prize Dramatic – Waiting for the Moon
- Grand Jury Prize Dramatic – The Trouble with Dick
- Grand Jury Prize Documentary – Sherman's March
- Excellence in Cinematography Award Dramatic – No Picnic
- Excellence in Cinematography Award Documentary – Chile: When Will It End?
- Special Jury Recognition – Working Girls
- Special Jury Recognition – River's Edge
- Special Jury Prize Documentary – Chile: When Will It End?
- Special Jury Prize for Originality – Sullivan's Pavilion

=== 1988 ===
- Grand Jury Prize Dramatic – Heat and Sunlight
- Grand Jury Prize Documentary – Beirut: The Last Home Movie
- Excellence in Cinematography Award Dramatic – Rachel River
- Excellence in Cinematography Award Documentary – Beirut: The Last Home Movie
- Special Jury Prize – Lemon Sky
- Special Jury Prize Documentary – Thy Kingdom Come, Thy Will Be Done
- Special Jury Prize Documentary – Dear America: Letters Home from Vietnam
- Special Jury Prize for Acting – Viveca Lindfors in Rachel River
- Special Jury Recognition – The Brave Little Toaster

=== 1989 ===
- Grand Jury Prize Dramatic – True Love
- Grand Jury Prize Documentary – For All Mankind
- Audience Award Documentary – For All Mankind
- Audience Award Dramatic – sex, lies and videotape
- Filmmakers Trophy Dramatic – Powwow Highway
- Filmmakers Trophy Documentary – John Huston
- Special Jury Recognition – The Roommate

== 1990s ==
=== 1990 ===
- Grand Jury Prize Dramatic – Chameleon Street
- Grand Jury Prize Documentary – H-2 Worker
- Grand Jury Prize Documentary – Water and Power
- Excellence in Cinematography Award Documentary – H-2 Worker
- Excellence in Cinematography Award Dramatic – House Party
- Filmmakers Trophy Dramatic – House Party
- Filmmakers Trophy Documentary – Metamorphosis: Man Into Woman
- Audience Award Dramatic – Longtime Companion
- Audience Award Documentary – Berkeley in the Sixties
- Special Jury Recognition – To Sleep with Anger
- Special Jury Recognition – Samsara: Death and Rebirth in Cambodia

=== 1991 ===
- Grand Jury Prize Dramatic – Poison
- Grand Jury Prize Documentary – American Dream
- Grand Jury Prize Documentary – Paris Is Burning
- Filmmakers Trophy Dramatic – Privilege
- Filmmakers Trophy Documentary – American Dream
- Audience Award Dramatic – One Cup of Coffee
- Audience Award Documentary – American Dream
- Excellence in Cinematography Award Dramatic – Daughters of the Dust
- Excellence in Cinematography Award Documentary – Christo in Paris
- Special Jury Recognition – Straight Out of Brooklyn
- Waldo Salt Screenwriting Award – Hangin' with the Homeboys
- Waldo Salt Screenwriting Award – Trust

=== 1992 ===
- Grand Jury Prize Dramatic – In the Soup
- Grand Jury Prize Documentary – A Brief History of Time
- Grand Jury Prize Documentary – Finding Christa
- Filmmakers Trophy Dramatic – Zebrahead
- Filmmakers Trophy Documentary – A Brief History of Time
- Audience Award Dramatic – The Waterdance
- Audience Award Documentary – Brother's Keeper
- Excellence in Cinematography Award Dramatic – Swoon
- Excellence in Cinematography Award Documentary – Shoot for the Contents
- Special Jury Recognition – The Hours and Times
- Special Jury Recognition – My Crasy Life
- Special Jury Prize for Acting – Seymour Cassel for his performance in In the Soup
- Waldo Salt Screenwriting Award – The Waterdance
- Piper-Heidseick Award for Independent Vision – John Turturro

=== 1993 ===
- Grand Jury Prize Dramatic – Ruby in Paradise
- Grand Jury Prize Dramatic – Public Access
- Grand Jury Prize Documentary – Silverlake Life: The View from Here
- Filmmakers Trophy Dramatic – Fly by Night
- Audience Award Dramatic – El Mariachi
- Audience Award Documentary – Something Within Me
- Excellence in Cinematography Award Dramatic – An Ambush of Ghosts
- Excellence in Cinematography Award Documentary – Children of Fate: Life and Death in a Sicilian Family
- Waldo Salt Screenwriting Award – Combination Platter
- Special Jury Recognition – Just Another Girl on the I.R.T.
- Special Jury Recognition – Earth and the American Dream
- Piper-Heidsieck Tribute to Independent Vision – Denzel Washington

=== 1994 ===
- Grand Jury Prize Dramatic – What Happened Was...
- Grand Jury Prize Documentary – Freedom on My Mind
- Filmmakers Trophy Dramatic – Clerks
- Filmmakers Trophy Dramatic – Fresh
- Filmmakers Trophy Documentary – Theremin: An Electronic Odyssey
- Waldo Salt Screenwriting Award – What Happened Was...
- Audience Award Dramatic – Spanking the Monkey
- Audience Award Documentary – Hoop Dreams
- Excellence in Cinematography Award Dramatic – Suture
- Excellence in Cinematography Award Documentary – Colorado Cowboy: The Bruce Ford Story
- Freedom of Expression Award – Dialogues with Madwomen
- Freedom of Expression Award – Heart of the Matter
- Special Jury Recognition – Coming Out Under Fire
- Special Jury Recognition for Acting – Alicia Witt, Renee Humphrey for Fun
- Piper-Heidsieck Tribute to Independent Vision – Gena Rowlands

=== 1995 ===
- Grand Jury Prize Dramatic – The Brothers McMullen
- Grand Jury Prize Dramatic – The Young Poisoner's Handbook
- Grand Jury Prize Documentary – Crumb
- Filmmakers Trophy Dramatic – Angela
- Filmmakers Trophy Documentary – Black Is... Black Ain't
- Audience Award Dramatic – Picture Bride
- Audience Award Documentary – Ballot Measure 9 and Unzipped
- Waldo Salt Screenwriting Award – Living in Oblivion
- Freedom of Expression Award – When Billy Broke His Head...and Other Tales of Wonder
- Special Jury Recognition for Directing – Jupiter's Wife
- Special Jury Recognition for Directing – Heavy
- Special Jury Recognition for Directing – Rhythm Thief
- Special Jury Recognition – El héroe
- Honorable Mention Latin American Cinema – Eagles Don't Hunt Flies
- Honorable Mention Latin American Cinema – Strawberry and Chocolate
- Honorable Mention Short Filmmaking – The Salesman and Other Adventures
- Honorable Mention Short Filmmaking – Tom's Flesh
- Honorable Mention Short Filmmaking – Nonnie & Alex
- Piper-Heidsieck Tribute to Independent Vision – Nicolas Cage

=== 1996 ===
- Grand Jury Prize Dramatic – Welcome to the Dollhouse
- Grand Jury Prize Documentary – Troublesome Creek: A Midwestern
- Filmmakers Trophy Dramatic – Girls Town
- Audience Award Dramatic – Care of the Spitfire Grill
- Audience Award Documentary – Troublesome Creek: A Midwestern
- Excellence in Cinematography Award Dramatic – Color of a Brisk and Leaping Day
- Excellence in Cinematography Award Documentary – Cutting Loose
- Waldo Salt Screenwriting Award – Big Night
- Freedom of Expression Award – The Celluloid Closet
- Special Jury Recognition – When We Were Kings
- Special Jury Prize for Acting – Lili Taylor for I Shot Andy Warhol
- Honorable Mention Latin American Cinema – Guantanamera
- Honorable Mention Latin American Cinema – Wild Horses
- Honorable Mention Short Filmmaking – Pig!
- Honorable Mention Short Filmmaking – Dry Mount
- Piper-Heidsieck Tribute to Independent Vision – Dianne Wiest

=== 1997 ===
- Grand Jury Prize Dramatic – Sunday
- Grand Jury Prize Documentary – Girls Like Us
- Audience Award Dramatic – Love Jones
- Audience Award Dramatic – Hurricane
- Audience Award Documentary – Paul Monette: The Brink of Summer's End
- Filmmakers Trophy Documentary – Licensed to Kill
- Filmmakers Trophy Dramatic – In the Company of Men
- Freedom of Expression Award – Family Name
- Freedom of Expression Award – Fear and Learning at Hoover Elementary
- Excellence in Cinematography Award Documentary – My America ...or Honk if You Love Buddha
- Special Jury Recognition – Kirby Dick for SICK: The Life & Death of Bob Flanagan, Supermasochist / Parker Posey for The House of Yes
- Latin American Cinema Award – Landscapes of Memory
- Short Filmmaking Award – Man About Town
- Honorable Mention Latin American Cinema – Deep Crimson
- Honorable Mention Latin American Cinema – Syphon Gun
- Honorable Mention Short Filmmaking – Birdhouse
- Piper-Heidsieck Tribute to Independent Vision – Tim Robbins

=== 1998 ===
- Grand Jury Prize Dramatic – Slam
- Grand Jury Prize Documentary – Frat House (tie)
- Grand Jury Prize Documentary – The Farm: Angola, USA (tie)
- Special Jury Prize for Acting – Miss Monday
- Special Jury Prize Short Filmmaking – Fishbelly White
- Filmmakers Trophy Dramatic – Smoke Signals
- Filmmakers Trophy Documentary – Divine Trash
- Directing Award Dramatic – Pi
- Directing Award Documentary – Moment of Impact
- Excellence in Cinematography Award Dramatic – 2by4
- Excellence in Cinematography Award Documentary – Wild Man Blues
- Waldo Salt Screenwriting Award – High Art
- Freedom of Expression Award – The Decline of Western Civilization III
- Honorable Mention Latin American Cinema – Who the Hell Is Juliette?
- Audience Award Dramatic – Smoke Signals
- Audience Award Documentary – Out of the Past
- Honorable Mention Short Filmmaking – Snake Feed
- Honorable Mention Short Filmmaking – Human Remains
- Piper-Heidseick Tribute to Independent Vision – Frances McDormand

=== 1999 ===
- Grand Jury Prize Dramatic – Three Seasons
- Grand Jury Prize Documentary – American Movie
- Audience Award Documentary – Genghis Blues
- Audience Award Dramatic – Three Seasons
- Excellence in Cinematography Award Dramatic – Three Seasons
- Excellence in Cinematography Award Documentary – Regret to Inform
- Excellence in Cinematography Award Documentary – Rabbit in the Moon
- Directing Award Dramatic – Judy Berlin
- Directing Award Documentary – Regret to Inform
- Freedom of Expression Award – The Black Press: Soldiers Without Swords
- Waldo Salt Screenwriting Award – Joe the King (tie)
- Waldo Salt Screenwriting Award – Guinevere (tie)
- World Cinema Audience Award – Run Lola Run (tie)
- World Cinema Audience Award – Train of Life (tie)
- Filmmakers Trophy Dramatic – Tumbleweeds
- Filmmakers Trophy Documentary – Sing Faster: The Stagehands' Ring Cycle
- Honorable Mention Short Filmmaking – Stubble Trouble
- Honorable Mention Short Filmmaking – Come unto Me: The Faces of Tyree Guyton
- Honorable Mention Short Filmmaking – A Pack of Gifts, Now
- Honorable Mention Short Filmmaking – Atomic Tabasco
- Honorable Mention Short Filmmaking – Devil Doll/Ring Pull
- Jury Prize Latin American Cinema – Little Saints
- Jury Prize Short Filmmaking – More
- Special Jury Prize – On the Ropes
- Special Jury Prize Latin American Cinema – Life is to Whistle
- Special Jury Prize for Acting – Happy, Texas
- Special Jury Prize for Distinctive Vision in Filmmaking – Treasure Island
- Piper-Heidsieck tribute to Independent Vision – Laura Dern

== 2000s ==
=== 2000 ===
- Grand Jury Prize Documentary – Long Night's Journey into Day
- Grand Jury Prize Dramatic – Girlfight & You Can Count on Me (tie)
- Directing Award Dramatic – Girlfight
- Directing Award Documentary – Paragraph 175
- Waldo Salt Screenwriting Award – You Can Count on Me
- Freedom of Expression Award – Dark Days
- Audience Award Documentary – Dark Days
- Audience Award Dramatic – Two Family House
- Excellence in Cinematography Award Documentary – Americanos: Latino Life in The United States
- Excellence in Cinematography Award Documentary – Dark Days
- Excellence in Cinematography Award Dramatic – Committed
- World Cinema Audience Award – Saving Grace
- Special Jury Prize for Artistic Achievement – The Ballad of Ramblin' Jack
- Special Jury Prize for Writing – George Wallace: Settin' the Woods on Fire
- Special Jury Prize for Ensemble Cast – The Tao of Steve
- Special Jury Prize for Ensemble Cast – Songcatcher
- Jury Prize Latin American Cinema – Herod's Law
- Jury Prize Short Filmmaking – Five Feet High and Rising
- Honorable Mention Short Filmmaking – G.
- Honorable Mention Short Filmmaking – No One Writes to the Colonel
- Honorable Mention Short Filmmaking – Darling International
- Honorable Mention Short Filmmaking – The Bats
- Piper-Heidsieck tribute to Independent Vision – Kevin Spacey

=== 2001 ===
- Grand Jury Prize Documentary – Southern Comfort
- Grand Jury Prize Dramatic – The Believer
- Audience Award Dramatic – Hedwig and the Angry Inch
- Audience Award Documentary – Dogtown and Z-Boys & Scout's Honor
- Directing Award Documentary – Dogtown and Z-Boys
- Directing Award Dramatic – Hedwig and the Angry Inch
- Freedom of Expression Award – Scout's Honor
- World Cinema Audience Award – The Road Home
- Excellence in Cinematography Award Documentary – LaLee's Kin: The Legacy of Cotton
- Excellence in Cinematography Award Dramatic – The Deep End
- Waldo Salt Screenwriting Award – Memento
- Special Jury Prize for Acting – In the Bedroom
- Special Jury Prize Documentary – Children Underground
- Jury Prize Latin American Cinema – Possible Loves
- Jury Prize Latin American Cinema – Sin Dejar Huella (English title Without a Trace)
- Special Jury Prize Latin American Cinema – Coffin Joe - The Strange World Of José Mojica Marins
- Jury Prize in Short Filmmaking – Gina, An Actress, Age 29
- Honorable Mention Short Filmmaking – Delusions in Modern Primitivism
- Honorable Mention Short Filmmaking – Jigsaw Venus
- Honorable Mention Short Filmmaking – Metropopular
- Honorable Mention Short Filmmaking – Peter Rabbit and the Crucifix
- Honorable Mention Short Filmmaking – Pie Fight '69
- Honorable Mention Short Filmmaking – Sweet
- Honorable Mention Short Filmmaking – Zen and the Art of Landscaping
- Piper-Heidsieck Award – Julianne Moore

=== 2002 ===
- Audience Award Documentary – Amandla!: A Revolution in Four-Part Harmony
- Audience Award Dramatic – Real Women Have Curves
- Directing Award Documentary – Sister Helen
- Directing Award Dramatic – Tadpole
- Excellence in Cinematography Award Documentary – Blue Vinyl
- Excellence in Cinematography Award Dramatic – Personal Velocity: Three Portraits
- Freedom of Expression Award – Amandla!: A Revolution in Four-Part Harmony
- Grand Jury Prize Documentary – Daughter from Danang
- Grand Jury Prize Dramatic – Personal Velocity: Three Portraits
- Honorable Mention Short Filmmaking – No Dumb Questions
- Honorable Mention Short Filmmaking – The Parlor
- Honorable Mention Short Filmmaking – Stuck
- Honorable Mention Short Filmmaking – Drowning Lessons
- Honorable Mention Short Filmmaking – Bus 44
- Honorable Mention Short Filmmaking – Morning Breath
- Jury Prize Latin American Cinema – The Trespasser
- Jury Prize Short Filmmaking – Gasline
- Special Jury Prize Documentary – Senorita Extraviada
- Special Jury Prize Documentary – How to Draw a Bunny
- Special Jury Prize for Ensemble Cast – Manito
- Special Jury Prize for Originality – Secretary
- Waldo Salt Screenwriting Award – Love Liza
- World Cinema Audience Award – L'ultimo bacio
- World Cinema Audience Award – Bloody Sunday

=== 2003 ===
- Alfred P. Sloan Prize – Dopamine
- Audience Award Documentary – My Flesh and Blood
- Audience Award Dramatic – The Station Agent
- Directing Award Dramatic – thirteen
- Excellence in Cinematography Award Documentary – Stevie
- Excellence in Cinematography Award Dramatic – Quattro Noza
- Freedom of Expression Award – What I Want My Words to Do to You
- Grand Jury Prize Documentary – Capturing the Friedmans
- Grand Jury Prize Dramatic – American Splendor
- Honorable Mention Short Filmmaking – Ocularist
- Honorable Mention Short Filmmaking – The Planets
- Honorable Mention Short Filmmaking – Pan with Us
- Honorable Mention Short Filmmaking – The Freak
- Honorable Mention Short Filmmaking – Asylum
- Honorable Mention Short Filmmaking – Fits & Starts
- Honorable Mention Short Filmmaking – Earthquake
- Honorable Mention Short Filmmaking – From the 104th Floor
- Jury Prize Short Filmmaking – Terminal Bar
- Online Film Festival Audience Award Short Filmmaking – One
- Online Film Festival Audience Award Short Filmmaking Animation – Broken Saints
- Online Film Festival Second Place Audience Award Short Filmmaking – S-11 Redux: Channel Surfing the Apocalypse
- Online Film Festival Second Place Audience Award Short Filmmaking Animation – LOR
- Online Film Festival Third Place Audience Award Short Filmmaking – Icarus of Pittsburgh
- Online Film Festival Third Place Audience Award Short Filmmaking Animation – Bumble Beeing
- Waldo Salt Screenwriting Award – The Station Agent
- World Cinema Audience Award – Whale Rider

=== 2004 ===
- Alfred P. Sloan Prize – Primer
- Audience Award Documentary – Born into Brothels
- Audience Award Dramatic – Maria Full of Grace
- Directing Award Documentary – Super Size Me
- Directing Award Dramatic – Down to the Bone
- Excellence in Cinematography Award Documentary – Imelda
- Excellence in Cinematography Award Dramatic – November
- Freedom of Expression Award – Repatriation
- Grand Jury Prize Documentary – Dig!
- Grand Jury Prize Dramatic – Primer
- Honorable Mention in Short Filmmaking – Curtis
- Honorable Mention in Short Filmmaking – Harvie Krumpet
- Honorable Mention in Short Filmmaking – Krumped
- Honorable Mention in Short Filmmaking – Papillon D'Amour
- Honorable Mention in Short Filmmaking – Spokane
- Jury Prize in Short Filmmaking – When the Storm Came
- Jury Prize in Short Filmmaking – Gowanus, Brooklyn
- Jury Prize in International Short Filmmaking – Tomo
- Online Film Festival Audience Award Short Filmmaking – Strangers by Erez Tadmor
- Online Film Festival Audience Award Short Filmmaking Animation – Drum Machine
- Online Film Festival Jury Award Short Filmmaking – Wet Dreams and False Images
- Online Film Festival Jury Award Short Filmmaking Animation – Bathtime in Clerkenwell
- Online Film Festival Jury Award Short Filmmaking New Forms – The Dawn at My Back: Memoir of a Texas Upgringing
- Special Jury Prize Documentary – Farmingville
- Special Jury Prize Dramatic – Brother to Brother
- Special Jury Prize for Acting – Vera Farmiga for her performance in Down to the Bone
- Waldo Salt Screenwriting Award – Larry Gross for We Don't Live Here Anymore
- World Cinema Audience Award Documentary – The Corporation
- World Cinema Audience Award Dramatic – Seducing Doctor Lewis

=== 2005 ===
- Special Jury Prize for Editing – Murderball
- Audience Award Documentary – Murderball
- Audience Award Dramatic – Hustle & Flow
- Directing Award Documentary – Jeff Feuerzeig for The Devil and Daniel Johnston
- Directing Award Dramatic – Noah Baumbach for The Squid and the Whale
- Excellence in Cinematography Award Documentary – The Education of Shelby Knox
- Excellence in Cinematography Award Dramatic – Hustle & Flow
- Grand Jury Prize Documentary – Why We Fight
- Grand Jury Prize Dramatic – Forty Shades of Blue
- Honorable Mention in Short Filmmaking – One Weekend A Month
- Honorable Mention in Short Filmmaking – Small Town Secrets
- Honorable Mention in Short Filmmaking – Victoria Para Chino
- Honorable Mention in Short Filmmaking – Tama Tu
- Honorable Mention in Short Filmmaking – Ryan
- Honorable Mention in Short Filmmaking – Bullets in the Hood: A Bed-Stuy Story
- Jury Prize in Short Filmmaking – Family Portrait
- Jury Prize in International Short Filmmaking – Wasp
- Special Jury Prize Documentary – After Innocence
- Special Jury Prize for Acting – Amy Adams in Junebug
- Special Jury Prize for Acting – Lou Pucci in Thumbsucker
- Special Jury Prize for Originality of Vision Dramatic – Miranda July writer, director, and actor in Me and You and Everyone We Know
- Special Jury Prize for Originality of Vision Dramatic – Rian Johnson director of Brick
- Waldo Salt Screenwriting Award – Noah Baumbach for The Squid and the Whale
- World Cinema Jury Prize Documentary – Shape of the Moon
- World Cinema Jury Prize Dramatic – The Hero
- World Cinema Audience Award Dramatic – Brothers
- World Cinema Special Jury Prize Documentary – The Liberace of Baghdad
- World Cinema Special Jury Prize Documentary – Wall
- World Cinema Special Jury Prize Dramatic – The Forest For the Trees
- World Cinema Special Jury Prize Dramatic – Live-In Maid

=== 2006 ===
- 2006 Alfred P. Sloan Prize – The House of Sand
- Audience Award Documentary – God Grew Tired of Us
- Audience Award Dramatic – Quinceañera
- Directing Award Documentary – James Longley for Iraq in Fragments
- Directing Award Dramatic – Dito Montiel for A Guide to Recognizing Your Saints
- Editing Award Documentary – Iraq in Fragments
- Excellence in Cinematography Award Documentary – James Longley for Iraq in Fragments
- Excellence in Cinematography Award Dramatic – Tom Richmond for Right at Your Door
- Grand Jury Prize Documentary – God Grew Tired of Us
- Grand Jury Prize Dramatic – Quinceañera
- Honorable Mention in Short Filmmaking – Before Dawn
- Honorable Mention in Short Filmmaking – Undressing My Mother
- Jury Prize in Short Filmmaking – Bugcrush
- Jury Prize in Short Filmmaking – The Wraith of Cobble Hill
- Jury Prize in International Short Filmmaking – The Natural Route
- Special Jury Prize Documentary – American Blackout
- Special Jury Prize Documentary – TV Junkie
- Special Jury Prize for Independent Vision Dramatic – In Between Days
- Waldo Salt Screenwriting Award – Hilary Brougher for Stephanie Daley
- World Cinema Audience Award Documentary – De Nadie
- World Cinema Audience Award Dramatic – No. 2
- World Cinema Jury Prize Documentary – In the Pit
- World Cinema Jury Prize Dramatic – 13 Tzameti
- World Cinema Special Jury Prize Documentary – Into Great Silence
- World Cinema Special Jury Prize Documentary – Dear Pyongyang
- World Cinema Special Jury Prize Dramatic – Eve and the Fire Horse

=== 2007 ===
- 2007 Alfred P. Sloan Prize – Dark Matter
- Audience Award: Documentary – Hear and Now
- Audience Award: Dramatic – Grace Is Gone
- Directing Award Documentary – Sean Fine and Andrea Nix Fine for War/Dance
- Directing Award Dramatic – Jeffrey Blitz for Rocket Science
- Editing Award Documentary – Hibah Sherif Frisina, Charlton McMillan, and Michael Schweitzer for Nanking
- Excellence in Cinematography Award Documentary – Manda Bala (Send a Bullet)
- Excellence in Cinematography Award Dramatic – Benoît Debie for Joshua
- Grand Jury Prize Documentary – Manda Bala (Send a Bullet)
- Grand Jury Prize Dramatic – Padre Nuestro
- Honorable Mentions in Short Filmmaking – Death to the Tinman
- Honorable Mentions in Short Filmmaking – t.o.m.
- Honorable Mentions in Short Filmmaking – Men Understand Each Other Better (Mardha Hamdigar Ra Behtar Mifahmand)
- Honorable Mentions in Short Filmmaking – Spitfire 944
- Honorable Mentions in Short Filmmaking – Motodrom
- Honorable Mentions in Short Filmmaking – The Fighting Cholitas
- Jury Prize in Short Filmmaking – Everything Will Be OK
- Jury Prize in International Short Filmmaking – The Tube With a Hat
- Special Jury Prize: Documentary – No End in Sight
- Special Jury Prize in Short Filmmaking – Freeheld
- Special Jury Prize for Acting – Jess Weixler in Teeth
- Special Jury Prize for Acting – Tamara Podemski in Four Sheets to the Wind
- Special Jury Prize for Singularity of Vision Dramatic – Chris Smith, director of The Pool
- Waldo Salt Screenwriting Award: Dramatic – James C. Strouse for Grace Is Gone
- World Cinema Audience Award: Documentary – In the Shadow of the Moon
- World Cinema Audience Award: Dramatic – Once
- World Cinema Jury Prize Documentary – Enemies of Happiness
- World Cinema Jury Prize Dramatic – Sweet Mud
- World Cinema Special Jury Prize Documentary – Hot House
- World Cinema Special Jury Prize Dramatic – L' Héritage (The Legacy)

=== 2008 ===
- Alfred P. Sloan Feature Film Prize – Sleep Dealer
- Audience Award: Documentary – Fuel
- Audience Award: Dramatic – The Wackness
- Directing Award: Documentary – American Teen
- Directing Award: Dramatic – Ballast
- Editing Award Documentary – Roman Polanski: Wanted and Desired
- Excellence in Cinematography Award: Documentary – Patti Smith: Dream of Life
- Excellence in Cinematography Award: Dramatic – Ballast
- Grand Jury Prize: Documentary – Trouble the Water
- Grand Jury Prize: Dramatic – Frozen River
- Honorable Mention in Short Filmmaking – Aquarium
- Honorable Mention in Short Filmmaking – August 15th
- Honorable Mention in Short Filmmaking – La Corona (The Crown)
- Honorable Mention in Short Filmmaking – Oiran Lyrics
- Honorable Mention in Short Filmmaking – Spider
- Honorable Mention in Short Filmmaking – Suspension
- Honorable Mention in Short Filmmaking – W.
- Jury Prize Short Filmmaking – My Olympic Summer
- Jury Prize Short Filmmaking – Sikumi (On the Ice)
- Jury Prize International Short Filmmaking – Soft
- Special Jury Prize: Documentary – The Greatest Silence: Rape in the Congo
- Special Jury Prize for Spirit of Independence – Anywhere, U.S.A.
- Special Jury Prize for Ensemble Cast – Choke
- Waldo Salt Screenwriting Award – Sleep Dealer
- World Cinema Audience Award: Dramatic – Captain Abu Raed
- World Cinema Cinematography Award Documentary – Recycle
- World Cinema Directing Award Documentary – Durakovo: The Village of Fools (Durakovo: Le Village Des Fous)
- World Cinema Directing Award Dramatic – Mermaid (Rusalka)
- World Cinema Documentary Editing Award – The Art Star and the Sudanese Twins
- World Cinema Jury Prize Documentary – Man on Wire
- World Cinema Jury Prize Dramatic – King of Ping Pong (Ping Pongkingen)
- World Cinema Screenwriting Award – I Always Wanted to Be a Gangster (J'ai Toujours Rêvé d'Être un Gangster)
- World Cinema Special Jury Prize: Dramatic – Blue Eyelids (Párpados Azules)

=== 2009 ===
- 2009 Alfred P. Sloan Prize – Adam
- Audience Award: Dramatic – Precious: Based on the Novel "Push" by Sapphire
- Audience Award: Documentary – The Cove
- Directing Award Dramatic – Cary Joji Fukunaga for Sin Nombre
- Directing Award Documentary – Natalia Almada for El General
- Excellence in Cinematography Award: Dramatic – Adriano Goldman for Sin Nombre
- Excellence in Cinematography Award: Documentary – Bob Richman for The September Issue
- Editing Award Documentary – Karen Schmeer for Sergio
- Grand Jury Prize: Dramatic – Precious: Based on the Novel "Push" by Sapphire
- Grand Jury Prize: Documentary – We Live in Public
- Honorable Mention Short Filmmaking – Omelette
- Honorable Mention Short Filmmaking – The Attack of the Robots from Nebula-5
- Honorable Mention Short Filmmaking – Jerrycan
- Honorable Mention Short Filmmaking – Western Spaghetti
- Honorable Mention Short Filmmaking – I Live in the Woods
- Honorable Mention Short Filmmaking – Love You More
- Honorable Mention Short Filmmaking – Protect You + Me.
- Honorable Mention Short Filmmaking – Treevenge
- Jury Prize Short Filmmaking – Short Term 12
- Jury Prize International Short Filmmaking – Lies
- Special Jury Prize Documentary – Good Hair
- Special Jury Prize for Spirit of Independence – Humpday
- Special Jury Prize for Acting – Mo'Nique for Precious: Based on the Novel "Push" by Sapphire
- Waldo Salt Screenwriting Award: Dramatic – Nicholas Jasenovec and Charlyne Yi for Paper Heart
- World Cinema Audience Award: Documentary – Afghan Star
- World Cinema Audience Award: Dramatic – An Education
- World Cinema Cinematography Award: Documentary – John Maringouin for Big River Man
- World Cinema Cinematography Award: Dramatic – John De Borman for An Education
- World Cinema Directing Award: Documentary – Havana Marking for Afghan Star
- World Cinema Documentary Editing Award – Janus Billeskov Jansen and Thomas Papapetros for Burma VJ
- World Cinema Jury Prize Documentary – Rough Aunties
- World Cinema Jury Prize Dramatic – The Maid (La Nana)
- World Cinema Screenwriting Award – Guy Hibbert for Five Minutes of Heaven
- World Cinema Special Jury Prize Documentary – Tibet in Song
- World Cinema Special Jury Prize for Acting – Catalina Saavedra for The Maid (La Nana)
- World Cinema Special Jury Prize for Originality – Louise-Michel

== 2010s ==
=== 2010 ===
- Alfred P. Sloan Prize – Obselidia
- Audience Award: Dramatic – happythankyoumoreplease
- Audience Award: Documentary – Waiting for "Superman"
- Best of NEXT – Homewrecker (2010 film)
- Directing Award Documentary – Smash His Camera
- Directing Award Dramatic – 3 Backyards
- Excellence in Cinematography Award Dramatic – Obselidia
- Excellence in Cinematography Award Documentary – The Oath
- Editing Award Documentary – Joan Rivers: A Piece of Work
- Grand Jury Prize: Documentary – Restrepo
- Grand Jury Prize: Dramatic – Winter's Bone
- Honorable Mention in Short Filmmaking – Born Sweet
- Honorable Mention in Short Filmmaking – Can We Talk?
- Honorable Mention in Short Filmmaking – Dock Ellis & The LSD No-No
- Honorable Mention in Short Filmmaking – How I Met Your Father
- Honorable Mention in Short Filmmaking – Quadrangle
- Honorable Mention in Short Filmmaking – Rob and Valentyna in Scotland
- Honorable Mention in Short Filmmaking – Young Love
- Jury Prize International Short Filmmaking – The Six Dollar Fifty Man
- Jury Prize Short Filmmaking – Drunk History: Douglass & Lincoln
- Special Jury Prize Documentary – Gasland
- Special Jury Prize Dramatic – Sympathy for Delicious
- Waldo Salt Screenwriting Award – Winter's Bone
- World Cinema Audience Award Documentary – Waste Land
- World Cinema Audience Award Dramatic – Undertow
- World Cinema Cinematography Award Documentary – His & Hers
- World Cinema Cinematography Award Dramatic – The Man Next Door
- World Cinema Directing Award Documentary – Space Tourists
- World Cinema Directing Award Dramatic – Southern District
- World Cinema Documentary Editing Award – A Film Unfinished
- World Cinema Jury Prize Documentary – The Red Chapel (Det Røde Kapel)
- World Cinema Jury Prize Dramatic – Animal Kingdom
- World Cinema Screenwriting Award – Southern District
- World Cinema Special Jury Prize Documentary – Enemies of the People
- World Cinema Special Jury Prize for Acting – Grown Up Movie Star

=== 2011 ===
- Grand Jury Prize: Documentary – How to Die in Oregon
- Grand Jury Prize: Dramatic – Like Crazy
- World Cinema Jury Prize: Documentary – Hell and Back Again
- World Cinema Jury Prize: Dramatic – Happy, Happy
- Audience Award: Documentary – Buck
- Audience Award: Dramatic – Circumstance
- World Cinema Audience Award: Documentary – Senna
- World Cinema Audience Award: Dramatic – Kinyarwanda
- Best of NEXT Audience Award – to.get.her
- Directing Award: Documentary – Jon Foy for Resurrect Dead: The Mystery of the Toynbee Tiles
- Directing Award: Dramatic – Sean Durkin for Martha Marcy May Marlene
- World Cinema Directing Award: Documentary – James Marsh for Project Nim
- World Cinema Directing Award: Dramatic – Paddy Considine for Tyrannosaur
- Waldo Salt Screenwriting Award – Sam Levinson for Another Happy Day
- World Cinema Dramatic Screenwriting Award – Erez Kav-El for Restoration
- Documentary Editing Award – Matthew Hamachek and Marshall Curry for If a Tree Falls: A Story of the Earth Liberation Front
- World Cinema Documentary Editing Award – Goran Hugo Olsson and Hanna Lejonqvist for The Black Power Mixtape 1967-1975
- Excellence in Cinematography Award: Documentary – Eric Strauss, Ryan Hill and Peter Hutchens for The Redemption of General Butt Naked
- Excellence in Cinematography Award: Dramatic – Bradford Young for Pariah
- World Cinema Cinematography Award: Documentary – Danfung Dennis for Hell and Back Again
- World Cinema Cinematography Award: Dramatic – Diego F. Jimenez for All Your Dead Ones
- World Dramatic Special Jury Prizes for Breakout Performances – Peter Mullan and Olivia Colman for Tyrannosaur
- World Cinema Documentary Special Jury Prize – Position Among the Stars
- Documentary Special Jury Prize – Being Elmo: A Puppeteer's Journey
- Dramatic Special Jury Prize – Another Earth
- Dramatic Special Jury Prize for Breakout Performance – Felicity Jones for Like Crazy
- Jury Prize in Short Filmmaking – Brick Novax Pt 1 and 2
- International Jury Prize in Short Filmmaking – Deeper Than Yesterday
- Honorable Mention in Short Filmmaking – Choke
- Honorable Mention in Short Filmmaking – Diarchy
- Honorable Mention in Short Filmmaking – The External World
- Honorable Mention in Short Filmmaking – The Legend of Beaver Dam
- Honorable Mention in Short Filmmaking – Out of Reach
- Honorable Mention in Short Filmmaking – Protoparticles
- Alfred P. Sloan Feature Film Prize – Another Earth
- Sundance Institute/Mahindra Global Filmmaking Awards – Bogdan Mustata of Romania for Wolf, Ernesto Contrera of Mexico for I Dream In Another Language, Seng Tat Liew of Malaysia for In What City Does It Live?, and Talya Lavie of Israel for Zero Motivation
- Sundance Institute/NHK Award – Cherien Dabis, director of May in the Summer

=== 2012 ===
- Grand Jury Prize: Documentary – The House I Live In
- Grand Jury Prize: Dramatic – Beasts of the Southern Wild
- World Cinema Jury Prize: Documentary – The Law in These Parts
- World Cinema Jury Prize: Dramatic – Violeta Went to Heaven (Violeta se Fue a Los Cielos)
- Audience Award: U.S. Documentary – The Invisible War
- Audience Award: U.S. Dramatic – The Surrogate (retitled The Sessions)
- World Cinema Audience Award: Documentary – Searching for Sugar Man
- World Cinema Audience Award: Dramatic – Valley of Saints
- Best of NEXT Audience Award – Sleepwalk with Me
- Alfred P. Sloan Feature Film Prize – Robot & Frank
- U.S. Directing Award: Documentary – The Queen of Versailles
- U.S. Directing Award: Dramatic – Middle of Nowhere
- World Cinema Directing Award: Documentary – 5 Broken Cameras
- World Cinema Directing Award: Dramatic – Teddy Bear
- Waldo Salt Screenwriting Award – Safety Not Guaranteed
- World Cinema Screenwriting Award – Young & Wild
- U.S. Documentary Editing Award – Detropia
- World Cinema Documentary Editing Award – Indie Game: The Movie
- Excellence in Cinematography Award: U.S. Documentary – Chasing Ice
- Excellence in Cinematography Award: U.S. Dramatic – Beasts of the Southern Wild
- World Cinema Cinematography Award: Documentary – Putin's Kiss
- World Cinema Cinematography Award: Dramatic – My Brother the Devil
- U.S. Documentary Special Jury Prize for an Agent of Change – Love Free or Die
- U.S. Documentary Special Jury Prize for Spirit of Defiance – Ai Weiwei: Never Sorry
- U.S. Dramatic Special Jury Prize for Excellence in Independent Film Producing – Smashed and Nobody Walks
- U.S. Dramatic Special Jury Prize for Ensemble Acting – The Surrogate (retitled The Sessions)
- World Cinema Dramatic Special Jury Prize for Artistic Vision – Can
- World Cinema Documentary Special Jury Prize for its Celebration of the Artistic Spirit – Searching for Sugar Man
- Jury Prize: Short Filmmaking – Fishing Without Nets
- Short Film Audience Award – The Debutante Hunters

=== 2013 ===
- U. S. Grand Jury Prize: Dramatic – Fruitvale (retitled Fruitvale Station)
- U. S. Grand Jury Prize: Documentary – Blood Brother
- World Cinema Grand Jury Prize: Dramatic – Jiseul
- World Cinema Grand Jury Prize: Documentary – A River Changes Course
- Audience Award: U. S. Dramatic presented by Acura – Fruitvale (retitled Fruitvale Station)
- Audience Award: U.S. Documentary presented by Acura – Blood Brother
- Audience Award: World Cinema Dramatic – Metro Manila
- Audience Award: World Cinema: Documentary – The Square
- Audience Award: Best of NEXT – This Is Martin Bonner
- Directing Award: U. S. Dramatic – Afternoon Delight
- Directing Award: U. S. Documentary – Cutie and the Boxer
- Directing Award: World Cinema Dramatic – Crystal Fairy
- Directing Award: World Cinema Documentary – The Machine Which Makes Everything Disappear
- Cinematography Award: U. S. Dramatic – Ain't Them Bodies Saints
- Cinematography Award: U. S. Dramatic – Mother of George
- Cinematography Award: U. S. Documentary – Dirty Wars: The World Is a Battlefield
- Cinematography Award: World Cinema Dramatic – Lasting
- Cinematography Award: World Cinema Documentary – Who Is Dayani Cristal?
- U. S. Documentary Special Jury Award for Achievement in Filmmaking – Inequality for All
- U. S. Documentary Special Jury Award for Achievement in Filmmaking – American Promise
- U. S. Dramatic Special Jury Award for Acting – Miles Teller & Shailene Woodley, The Spectacular Now
- U. S. Dramatic Special Jury Award for Sound Design – Shane Carruth & Johnny Marshall, Upstream Color
- World Cinema Dramatic Special Jury Award – Circles
- World Cinema Documentary Special Jury Award for Punk Spirit – Pussy Riot – A Punk Prayer
- Editing Award: U. S. Documentary – Gideon's Army
- Editing Award: World Cinema Documentary – The Summit
- Waldo Salt Screenwriting Award: U.S. Dramatic – In a World...
- Screenwriting Award: World Cinema Dramatic – Wajma (An Afghan Love Story)
- Alfred P. Sloan Feature Film Prize – Computer Chess
- Short Film Grand Jury Prize – The Whistle
- Short Film Jury Award: US Fiction – Whiplash
- Short Film Jury Award: International Fiction – The Date
- Short Film Jury Award: Non-fiction – Skinningrove
- Short Film Jury Award: Animation – Irish Folk Furniture
- Short Film Special Jury Award for Acting – Joel Nagle, Palimpsest
- Short Film Special Jury Award – Kahlil Joseph, Until the Quiet Comes
- Short Film Audience Award, Presented by YouTube – Catnip: Egress to Oblivion

=== 2014 ===
- Grand Jury Prize: Dramatic – Whiplash
- Grand Jury Prize: Documentary - Rich Hill
- Directing Award: Dramatic – Fishing Without Nets
- Cinematography Award: Dramatic – Low Down
- Waldo Salt Screenwriting Award – The Skeleton Twins
- Special Jury Prize for Breakthrough Talent: Dramatic – Dear White People
- Special Jury Prize for Musical Score: Dramatic – Kumiko, the Treasure Hunter
- Directing Award: Documentary – The Case Against 8
- Cinematography Award: Documentary – E-Team
- Editing Award: Documentary – Watchers of the Sky
- Special Jury Prize for Intuitive Filmmaking: Documentary – The Overnighters
- Special Jury Prize for Use of Animation: Documentary – Watchers of the Sky
- World Cinema Grand Jury Prize: Dramatic – To Kill a Man
- World Cinema Directing Award: Dramatic – 52 Tuesdays
- World Cinema Cinematography Award: Dramatic – Lilting
- World Cinema Screenwriting Award – Blind
- World Cinema Special Jury Prize: Dramatic – God Help the Girl
- World Cinema Grand Jury Prize: Documentary – Return to Homs
- World Cinema Directing Award: Documentary – 20,000 Days on Earth
- World Cinema Cinematography Award : Documentary – Happiness
- World Cinema Editing Award: Documentary – 20,000 Days on Earth
- World Cinema Special Jury Prize: Documentary – We Come as Friends
- Audience Award: Dramatic – Whiplash
- Audience Award: Documentary – Alive Inside: A Story of Music and Memory
- World Cinema Audience Award: Dramatic – Difret
- World Cinema Audience Award: Documentary – The Green Prince
- Best of NEXT Audience Award – Imperial Dreams
- Short Filmmaking Audience Award – Chapel Perilous
- Short Film Grand Jury Prize – Of God and Dogs
- Short Film Jury Award: Animation – Yearbook
- Short Film Jury Award: International – The Cut
- Short Film Jury Award: Non-Fiction – I Think This Is the Closest to How the Footage Looked
- Short Film Jury Award: U.S. Fiction – Gregory Go Boom
- Special Jury Prize for Unique Vision: Short Filmmaking – Rat Pack Rat
- Special Jury Prize for Non-Fiction: Short Filmmaking – Love. Love. Love.
- Alfred P. Sloan Prize – I Origins

=== 2015 ===
- Grand Jury Prize: Dramatic – Me and Earl and the Dying Girl by Alfonso Gomez-Rejon
- Directing Award: Dramatic – Robert Eggers for The Witch
- Cinematography Award: Dramatic – Brandon Trost for The Diary of a Teenage Girl
- Editing Award: Dramatic – Lee Haugen for Dope
- Waldo Salt Screenwriting Award – Tim Talbott for The Stanford Prison Experiment
- Special Jury Prize for Collaborative Vision: Dramatic – Jennifer Phang and Jacqueline Kim for Advantageous
- Grand Jury Prize: Documentary – The Wolfpack by Crystal Moselle
- Directing Award: Documentary – Matthew Heineman for Cartel Land
- Cinematography Award: Documentary – Matthew Heineman and Matt Porwoll for Cartel Land
- Special Jury Prize for Breakout First Feature: Documentary – Lyric R. Cabral and David Felix Sutcliffe for (T)error
- Special Jury Prize for Verité Filmmaking: Documentary – Western by Bill and Turner Ross
- Special Jury Prize for Social Impact: Documentary – 3½ Minutes by Marc Silver
- World Cinema Grand Jury Prize: Dramatic – Slow West by John Maclean
- World Cinema Directing Award: Dramatic – Alantė Kavaitė for The Summer of Sangailé
- World Cinema Cinematography Award: Dramatic – Germain McMicking for Partisan
- World Cinema Special Jury Prize for Acting: Dramatic – Regina Casé and Camila Márdila for The Second Mother
- World Cinema Special Jury Prize for Acting: Dramatic – Jack Reynor for Glassland
- World Cinema Grand Jury Prize: Documentary – The Russian Woodpecker by Chad Gracia
- World Cinema Directing Award: Documentary – Kim Longinotto for Dreamcatcher
- World Cinema Editing Award: Documentary – Jim Scott for How to Change the World
- World Cinema Special Jury Prize for Impact: Documentary – Pervert Park by Frida and Lasse Barkfors
- World Cinema Special Jury Prize for Unparalleled Access: Documentary – The Chinese Mayor by Hao Zhou
- Audience Award: Dramatic – Me and Earl and the Dying Girl by Alfonso Gomez-Rejon
- Audience Award: Documentary – Meru by Jimmy Chin and Elizabeth Chai Vasarhelyi
- World Cinema Audience Award: Dramatic – Umrika by Prashant Nair
- World Cinema Audience Award: Documentary – Dark Horse by Louise Osmond
- Best of NEXT Audience Award – James White by Josh Mond
- Short Film Grand Jury Prize – World of Tomorrow by Don Hertzfeldt
- Short Film Jury Award: Animation – Storm hits jacket by Paul Cabon
- Short Film Jury Award: International – Oh Lucy! by Atsuko Hirayanagi
- Short Film Jury Award: Non-Fiction – The Face of Ukraine: Casting Oksana Baiul by Kitty Green
- Short Film Jury Award: U.S. Fiction – SMILF by Frankie Shaw
- Special Jury Prize for Acting: Short Filmmaking – Laure Calamy for Back Alley by Cécile Ducrocq
- Special Jury Prize for Visual Poetry: Short Filmmaking – Object by Paulina Skibińska
- Alfred P. Sloan Prize – The Stanford Prison Experiment

=== 2016 ===
- Grand Jury Prize: Dramatic – The Birth of a Nation by Nate Parker
- Directing Award: Dramatic – Daniel Scheinert and Daniel Kwan for Swiss Army Man
- Waldo Salt Screenwriting Award – Chad Hartigan for Morris From America
- U.S. Dramatic Special Jury Award – Miles Joris-Peyrafitte for As You Are
- U.S. Dramatic Special Jury Award for Breakthrough Performance – Joe Seo for Spa Night
- U.S. Dramatic Special Jury Award for Individual Performance – Melanie Lynskey for The Intervention and Craig Robinson for Morris from America
- Grand Jury Prize: Documentary – Weiner by Elyse Steinberg and Josh Kriegman
- Directing Award: Documentary – Roger Ross Williams for Life, Animated
- U.S. Documentary Special Jury Award for Editing – Penny Lane and Thom Stylinski for NUTS!
- Special Jury Prize for Social Impact: Documentary – Trapped by Dawn Porter
- U.S. Documentary Special Jury Award for Writing – Robert Greene for Kate Plays Christine
- Special Jury Prize for Verité Filmmaking: Documentary – The Bad Kids by Keith Fulton and Lou Pepe
- World Cinema Grand Jury Prize: Dramatic – Sand Storm by Elite Zexer
- World Cinema Directing Award: Dramatic – Felix van Groeningen for Belgica
- World Cinema Dramatic Special Jury Award for Acting – Vicky Hernandez and Manolo Cruz for Between Land and Sea
- World Cinema Dramatic Special Jury Award for Screenwriting – Ana Katz and Inés Bortagaray for Mi Amiga del Parque
- World Cinema Dramatic Special Jury Award for Unique Vision & Design – The Lure by Agnieszka Smoczyńska
- World Cinema Jury Prize: Documentary – Sonita by Rokhsareh Ghaemmaghami
- World Cinema Directing Award: Documentary – Michal Marczak for All These Sleepless Nights
- World Cinema Documentary Special Jury Award for Best Debut Feature – Heidi Brandenburg and Mathew Orzel for When Two Worlds Collide
- World Cinema Documentary Special Jury Award for Best Cinematography – Pieter-Jan De Pue for The Land of the Enlightened
- World Cinema Editing Award: Documentary – Mako Kamitsuna and John Maringouin for We Are X
- Audience Award: Dramatic – The Birth of a Nation by Nate Parker
- Audience Award: Documentary – Jim: The James Foley Story by Brian Oakes
- World Cinema Audience Award: Dramatic – Between Sea and Land by Manolo Cruz and Carlos del Castillo
- World Cinema Audience Award: Documentary – Sonita by Rokhsareh Ghaemmaghami
- Best of NEXT Audience Award – First Girl I Loved by Kerem Sanga
- Short Film Grand Jury Prize – Thunder Road by Jim Cummings
- Short Film Jury Award: US Fiction – The Procedure by Calvin Lee Reeder
- Short Film Jury Award: International Fiction – Maman(s) by Maïmouna Doucouré
- Short Film Jury Award: Non-fiction – Bacon & God's Wrath by Sol Friedman
- Short Film Jury Award: Animation – Edmond by Nina Gantz
- Short Film Special Jury Award for Outstanding Performance – Grace Glowicki for Her Friend Adam
- Short Film Special Jury Award for Best Direction – Ondřej Hudeček for Peacock
- Alfred P. Sloan Prize – Embrace of the Serpent by Ciro Guerra

=== 2017 ===
- Grand Jury Prize: Dramatic – I Don't Feel at Home in This World Anymore by Macon Blair
- Audience Award: Dramatic – Crown Heights by Matt Ruskin
- Directing Award: Dramatic – Eliza Hittman for Beach Rats
- Waldo Salt Screenwriting Award – David Branson Smith and Matt Spicer for Ingrid Goes West
- U.S. Dramatic Special Jury Award for Breakthrough Performance – Chanté Adams for Roxanne Roxanne
- U.S. Dramatic Special Jury Award for Breakthrough Director – Maggie Betts for Novitiate
- U.S. Dramatic Special Jury Award for Cinematography – Daniel Landin for The Yellow Birds
- Grand Jury Prize: Documentary – Dina by Dan Sickles and Antonio Santini
- Directing Award: Documentary – Peter Nicks for The Force
- U.S. Documentary Orwell Award - Icarus by Bryan Fogel
- U.S. Documentary Special Jury Award for Editing – Kim Roberts and Emiliano Battista for Unrest
- U.S. Documentary Special Jury Award for Storytelling – Yance Ford for Strong Island
- U.S. Documentary Special Jury Award for Inspirational Filmmaking – Amanda Lipitz for Step
- World Cinema Grand Jury Prize: Dramatic – The Nile Hilton Incident by Tarik Saleh
- World Cinema Directing Award: Dramatic – Francis Lee for God's Own Country
- World Cinema Dramatic Special Jury Award for Screenwriting – Kirsten Tan for Pop Aye
- World Cinema Dramatic Special Jury Award for Cinematic Visions – Geng Jun for Free and Easy
- World Cinema Dramatic Special Jury Award for Cinematography – Manuel Dacosse for Axolotl Overkill
- World Cinema Jury Prize: Documentary – Last Men in Aleppo by Feras Fayyad
- World Cinema Directing Award: Documentary – Pascale Lamche for Winnie
- World Cinema Documentary Special Jury Award for Masterful Storytelling – Catherine Bainbridge and Alfonso Maiorana for Rumble: The Indians Who Rocked the World
- World Cinema Documentary Special Jury Award for Best Cinematography – Rodrigo Trejo Villanueva for Machines
- World Cinema Documentary Special Jury Award for Editing – Ramona S. Diaz for Motherland
- Audience Award: Documentary – Chasing Coral by Jeff Orlowski
- World Cinema Audience Award: Dramatic – I Dream in Another Language by Ernesto Contreras
- World Cinema Audience Award: Documentary – Joshua: Teenager vs. Superpower by Joe Piscatella
- Best of NEXT Audience Award – Gook by Justin Chon
- Alfred P. Sloan Prize – Marjorie Prime by Michael Almereyda
- Short Film Grand Jury Prize - And so we put goldfish in the pool by Makoto Nagahisa
- Short Film Jury Award: U.S. Fiction - Lucia, Before and After by Anu Valia
- Short Film Jury Award: International Fiction - And The Whole Sky Fit In The Dead Cow's Eye by Francisca Alegría
- Short Film Jury Award: Nonfiction - Alone by Garrett Bradley
- Short Film Jury Award: Animation - Broken – The Women's Prison at Hoheneck by Volker Schlecht, Alexander Lahl, and Max Mönch
- Short Film Special Jury Award for Cinematography - Dadyaa — The Woodpeckers of Rotha by Pooja Gurung, Bibhusan Basnet, and Chintan Rajbhandari
- Short Film Special Jury Award for Editing - Laps by Charlotte Wells and Blair McClendon

=== 2018 ===
- U.S. Dramatic Grand Jury Prize Award: The Miseducation of Cameron Post, directed by Desiree Akhavan
- U.S. Dramatic Audience Award: Burden, directed by Andrew Heckler
- U.S. Dramatic Directing Award: The Kindergarten Teacher, directed by Sara Colangelo
- U.S. Dramatic Waldo Salt Screenwriting Award: Nancy, written by Christina Choe
- U.S. Dramatic Special Jury Award for Outstanding First Feature: Monsters and Men, directed by Reinaldo Marcus Green
- U.S. Dramatic Special Jury Award for Excellence in Filmmaking: I Think We're Alone Now, directed by Reed Morano
- U.S. Dramatic Special Jury Award for Achievement in Acting: Benjamin Dickey, Blaze
- U.S. Documentary Grand Jury Prize Award: Kailash (later released as The Price of Free), directed by Derek Doneen
- U.S. Documentary Audience Award: The Sentence, directed by Rudy Valdez
- U.S. Documentary Directing Award, On Her Shoulders, directed by Alexandria Bombach
- U.S. Documentary Special Jury Award for Social Impact: Crime + Punishment, directed by Stephen Maing
- U.S. Documentary Special Jury Award for Creative Vision: Hale County This Morning, This Evening, directed by RaMell Ross
- U.S. Documentary Special Jury Award for Breakthrough Filmmaking: Minding the Gap, directed by Bing Liu
- U.S. Documentary Special Jury Award for Storytelling: Three Identical Strangers, directed by Tim Wardle
- World Cinema Dramatic Grand Jury Prize: Butterflies, directed by Tolga Karacelik
- World Cinema Dramatic Audience Award: The Guilty, directed by Gustav Moller
- World Cinema Dramatic Directing Award: And Breathe Normally, directed by Ísold Uggadóttir
- World Cinema Dramatic Special Jury Award for Acting: Valeria Bertuccelli, The Queen of Fear
- World Cinema Dramatic Special Jury Award for Screenwriting: Time Share (Tiempo Compartido), written by Julio Chavezmontes and Sebastián Hofmann
- World Cinema Dramatic Special Jury Award for Ensemble Acting: Dead Pigs, directed by Cathy Yan
- World Cinema Documentary Grand Jury Prize: Of Fathers and Sons, directed by Talal Derki
- World Cinema Documentary Audience Award: This Is Home, directed by Alexandra Shiva
- World Cinema Documentary Directing Award: Shirkers, directed by Sandi Tan
- World Cinema Documentary Special Jury Award: Matangi/Maya/M.I.A., presented to director Stephen Loveridge and M.I.A.
- World Cinema Documentary Special Jury Award for Cinematography: Genesis 2.0, Peter Indergand and Maxim Arbugaev
- World Cinema Documentary Special Jury Award for Editing: Our New President, Maxim Pozdorovkin and Matvey Kulakov
- NEXT Audience Award: Searching, directed by Aneesh Chaganty
- NEXT Innovator Award: (tie) Night Comes On, directed by Jordana Spiro; We the Animals, directed by Jeremiah Zagar
- Short Film Grand Jury Prize: Matria, directed by Alvaro Gago
- Short Film Jury Award: U.S. Fiction: Hair Wolf, directed by Mariama Diallo
- Short Film Jury Award: International Fiction: Would You Look at Her, directed by Goran Stolevski
- Short Film Jury Award: Nonfiction: The Trader (Sovdagari), directed by Tamta Gabrichidze
- Short Film Jury Award: Animation: Glucose, directed by Jeron Braxton
- Special Jury Awards: Emergency, directed by Carey Williams; Fauve, directed by Jérémy Comte; and For Nonna Anna, directed by Luis De Filippis.
- Sundance Institute Open Borders Fellowship Presented by Netflix: Of Fathers and Sons (Syria), directed by Talal Derki; Untitled film (India), directed by Chaitanya Tamhane; and Prayers for the Stolen, directed by Tatiana Huezo
- Sundance Institute / NHK Award: His House, directed by Remi Weekes.
- Sundance Institute Alfred P. Sloan Feature Film Prize: Searching, Aneesh Chaganty and Sev Ohanian
- Sundance Institute / Amazon Studios Producers Award: Sev Ohanian

=== 2019 ===
- US Dramatic Grand Jury Prize: Clemency
- US Dramatic Audience Award: Brittany Runs a Marathon
- US Dramatic Directing: Joe Talbot for The Last Black Man in San Francisco
- US Dramatic Waldo Salt Screenwriting Award: Pippa Bianco for Share
- US Dramatic Special Jury Award for Vision and Craft: Alma Har'el for Honey Boy
- US Dramatic Special Jury Award for Creative Collaboration: The Last Black Man in San Francisco
- US Dramatic Special Jury Award for Breakthrough Performance: Rhianne Barreto for Share
- US Documentary Grand Jury Prize: One Child Nation
- US Documentary Audience Award: Knock Down the House
- US Documentary Directing: Steven Bognar and Julia Reichert for American Factory
- US Documentary Special Jury Award for Moral Urgency: Jacqueline Olive for Always in Season
- US Documentary Special Jury Award for Emerging Filmmaker: Liza Mandelup for Jawline
- US Documentary Special Jury Award for Cinematography: Luke Lorentzen for Midnight Family
- World Cinema Dramatic Grand Jury Prize: The Souvenir
- World Cinema Dramatic Audience Award: Queen of Hearts
- World Cinema Dramatic Directing: Lucía Garibaldi for The Sharks
- World Cinema Dramatic Special Jury Award: Alejandro Landes for Monos
- World Cinema Dramatic Special Jury Award for Acting: Krystyna Janda for Dolce Fine Giornata
- World Cinema Dramatic Special Jury Award for Originality: Makoto Nagahisa for We Are Little Zombies
- World Cinema Documentary Grand Jury Prize: Honeyland
- World Cinema Documentary Audience Award: Sea of Shadows
- World Cinema Documentary Directing: Mads Brügger for Cold Case Hammarskjöld
- World Cinema Documentary Special Jury Award for Impact for Change: Tamara Kotevska and Ljubomir Stefanov for Honeyland
- World Cinema Documentary Special Jury Award for Cinematography: Fejmi Daut and Samir Ljuma for Honeyland
- Short Film Grand Jury Prize: Aziza, directed by Soudade Kaadan
- Short Film Jury Award: U.S. Fiction: Green, directed by Susan Andrews Correa
- Short Film Jury Award: International Fiction: Dunya's Day, directed by Raed Alsemari
- Short Film Jury Award: Nonfiction: Ghosts of Sugar Land, directed by Bassam Tariq
- Short Film Jury Award: Animation: Reneepoptosis, directed by Renee Zhan
- Special Jury Award: Directing: Alexandra Lazarowich for Fast Horse; Robert Machoian for The Minors
- NEXT Audience Award: The Infiltrators
- NEXT Innovator Award: The Infiltrators
- Alfred P. Sloan Feature Film Prize: The Boy Who Harnessed the Wind
- Sundance Institute/Amazon Studios Producers Awards: Carly Hugo & Matt Parker for Share; Sev Ohanian for Lori Cheatle
- Sundance Open Borders Fellowship Presented by Netflix: Talal Derki for Of Fathers and Sons; Chaitanya Tamhane and Tatiana Huezo for Prayers for the Stolen

== 2020s ==
=== 2020 ===
- US Dramatic Grand Jury Prize: Minari
- US Dramatic Audience Award: Minari
- US Dramatic Directing Award: Radha Blank for The 40-Year-Old Version
- US Dramatic Waldo Salt Screenwriting Award: Edson Oda for Nine Days
- US Dramatic Special Jury Award for Ensemble Cast – The cast of Charm City Kings
- US Dramatic Special Jury Award: Auteur Filmmaking – Josephine Decker for Shirley
- US Dramatic Special Jury Award: Neo-Realism – Eliza Hittman for Never Rarely Sometimes Always
- US Documentary Grand Jury Prize: Boys State (Jesse Moss)
- US Documentary Audience Award: Crip Camp (Jim LeBrecht and Nicole Newnham)
- US Documentary Directing: Garrett Bradley for Time
- US Documentary Special Jury Award for Editing – Tyler H. Walk for Welcome to Chechnya
- US Documentary Special Jury Award for Innovation in Non-fiction Storytelling – Kirsten Johnson for Dick Johnson Is Dead
- US Documentary Special Jury Award for Emerging Filmmaker – Arthur Jones for Feels Good Man
- US Documentary Special Jury Award for Social Impact Filmmaking – Eli Despres, Josh Kriegman and Elyse Steinberg for The Fight
- World Cinema Dramatic Grand Jury Prize: Yalda, a Night for Forgiveness (Massoud Bakhshi)
- World Cinema Dramatic Audience Award: Identifying Features (Fernanda Valadez)
- World Cinema Dramatic Directing: Maïmouna Doucouré for Cuties
- World Cinema Dramatic Special Jury Award for Acting – Ben Whishaw for Surge
- World Cinema Dramatic Special Jury Award for Visionary Filmmaking – Lemohang Jeremiah Mosese for This Is Not a Burial, It's a Resurrection
- World Cinema Dramatic Special Jury Award for Best Screenplay – Astrid Rondero and Fernanda Valadez for Identifying Features
- World Cinema Documentary Grand Jury Prize: Epicentro (Hubert Sauper)
- World Cinema Documentary Audience Award: The Reason I Jump (Jerry Rothwell)
- World Cinema Documentary Directing: Iryna Tsilyk for The Earth Is Blue as an Orange
- World Cinema Documentary Special Jury Award for Creative Storytelling – Benjamin Ree for The Painter and the Thief
- World Cinema Documentary Special Jury Award for Cinematography – Radu Ciorniciuc and Mircea Topoleanu for Acasă, My Home
- World Cinema Documentary Special Jury Award for Editing – Mila Aung-Thwin, Ryan Mullins and Sam Soko for Softie
- Short Film Grand Jury Prize: So What if the Goats Die, directed by Sofia Alaoui
- Short Film Jury Award: U.S. Fiction: Ship: A Visual Poem, directed by Terrence Daye
- Short Film Jury Award: International Fiction: The Devil's Harmony, directed by Dylan Holmes Williams
- Short Film Jury Award: Nonfiction: John Was Trying to Contact Aliens, directed by Matthew Kilip
- Short Film Jury Award: Animation: Daughter, directed by Daria Kashcheeva
- NEXT Audience Award: I Carry You With Me (Heidi Ewing)
- NEXT Innovator Award: I Carry You With Me (Heidi Ewing)
- Alfred P. Sloan Feature Film Prize: Tesla (Michael Almereyda)

=== 2021 ===
- U.S. Grand Jury Prize: Dramatic Competition – CODA (Siân Heder)
- U.S. Grand Jury Prize: Documentary Competition – Summer of Soul (Ahmir “Questlove” Thompson)
- World Cinema Grand Jury Prize: Dramatic Competition – Hive (Blerta Basholli)
- World Cinema Grand Jury Prize: Documentary Competition – Flee (Jonas Poher Rasmussen)
- Audience Award: U.S.Dramatic – CODA (Siân Heder)
- Audience Award: U.S. Documentary – Summer of Soul (Ahmir “Questlove” Thompson)
- Audience Award: World Cinema Dramatic – Hive (Blerta Basholli)
- Audience Award: World Cinema Documentary – Writing with Fire (Rintu Thomas and Sushmit Ghosh)
- Audience Award: NEXT – Ma Belle, My Beauty (Marion Hill)
- Directing Award: U.S. Dramatic – Siân Heder for CODA
- Directing Award: U.S. Documentary – Natalia Almada for Users
- Directing Award: World Cinema Dramatic – Blerta Basholli for Hive
- Directing Award: World Cinema Documentary – Hogir Hirori for Sabaya
- Waldo Salt Screenwriting Award – Ari Katcher and Ryan Welch for On the Count of Three
- Jonathan Oppenheim Editing Award – Kristina Motwani and Rebecca Adorno for Homeroom
- NEXT Innovator Award - Dash Shaw for Cryptozoo
- U.S. Dramatic Special Jury Award for Ensemble Cast – The cast of CODA
- U.S. Dramatic Special Jury Award: Best Actor - Clifton Collins Jr. for Jockey
- U.S. Documentary Special Jury Award: Emerging Filmmaker - Parker Hill and Isabel Bethencourt for Cusp
- U.S. Documentary Special Jury Award: Nonfiction Experimentation - Theo Anthony for All Light, Everywhere
- World Cinema Documentary Special Jury Award: Vérité Filmmaking - Camilla Nielsson for President
- World Cinema Documentary Special Jury Award: Impact for Change - Rintu Thomas and Sushmit Ghosh for Writing with Fire
- World Cinema Dramatic Special Jury Award: Acting - Jesmark Scicluna for Luzzu
- World Cinema Dramatic Special Jury Award: Creative Vision - Baz Poonpiriya for One for the Road
- Short Film Grand Jury Prize - Lizard
- Short Film Jury Award: U.S. Fiction - The Touch of the Master's Hand
- Short Film Jury Award: International Fiction - Bambirak
- Short Film Jury Award: Nonfiction - Don't Go Tellin' Your Momma
- Short Film Jury Award: Animation - Souvenir Souvenir
- Short Film Special Jury Award for Acting - Wiggle Room
- Short Film Special Jury Award for Screenwriting - The Criminals
- Alfred P. Sloan Feature Film Prize - Son of Monarchs
- Sundance Institute/Amazon Studios Producers Award for Nonfiction - Nicole Salazar for Philly D.A.
- Sundance Institute/Amazon Studios Producers Award for Fiction - Natalie Qasabian for Run
- Sundance Institute/Adobe Mentorship Award for Editing Nonfiction - Juli Vizza
- Sundance Institute/Adobe Mentorship Award for Editing Fiction - Terilyn Shropshire
- Sundance Institute/NHK Award - Meryam Joobeur for Motherhood

=== 2022 ===
- U.S. Grand Jury Prize: Dramatic Competition – Nanny (Nikyatu Jusu)
- U.S. Grand Jury Prize: Documentary Competition – The Exiles (Ben Klein and Violet Columbus)
- World Cinema Grand Jury Prize: Dramatic Competition – Utama (Alejandro Loayza Grisi)
- World Cinema Grand Jury Prize: Documentary Competition – All That Breathes (Shaunak Sen)
- Festival Favorite – Navalny (Daniel Roher)
- Audience Award: U.S. Dramatic – Cha Cha Real Smooth (Cooper Raiff)
- Audience Award: U.S. Documentary – Navalny (Daniel Roher)
- Audience Award: World Cinema Dramatic – Girl Picture (Alli Haapasalo)
- Audience Award: World Cinema Documentary – The Territory (Alex Pritz)
- Audience Award: NEXT – Framing Agnes (Chase Joynt)
- Directing Award: U.S. Dramatic – Jamie Dack for Palm Trees and Power Lines
- Directing Award: U.S. Documentary – Reid Davenport for I Didn't See You There
- Directing Award: World Cinema Dramatic – Maryna Er Gorbach for Klondike
- Directing Award: World Cinema Documentary – Simon Lereng Wilmont for A House Made of Splinters
- Waldo Salt Screenwriting Award – K.D. Dávila for Emergency
- Jonathan Oppenheim Editing Award – Erin Casper and Jocelyne Chaput for Fire of Love
- NEXT Innovator Award – Chase Joynt for Framing Agnes
- U.S. Dramatic Special Jury Award: Ensemble Cast – The cast of 892
- U.S. Dramatic Special Jury Award: Uncompromising Artistic Vision – Bradley Rust Gray for blood
- U.S. Documentary Special Jury Award: Creative Vision – Margaret Brown for Descendant
- U.S. Documentary Special Jury Award: Impact for Change – Paula Eiselt and Tonya Lewis Lee for Aftershock
- World Cinema Dramatic Special Jury Award: Acting – Teresa Sánchez for Dos Estaciones
- World Cinema Dramatic Special Jury Award: Innovative Spirit – Martika Ramirez Escobar for Leonor Will Never Die
- World Cinema Documentary Special Jury Award: Excellence in Verité Filmmaking – Snow Hnin Ei Hlaing for Midwives
- World Cinema Documentary Special Jury Award: Documentary Craft – Alex Pritz for The Territory
- Short Film Grand Jury Prize – The Headhunter's Daughter
- Short Film Jury Award: U.S. Fiction – If I Go Will They Miss Me
- Short Film Jury Award: International Fiction – Warsha
- Short Film Jury Award: Nonfiction – Displaced
- Short Film Jury Award: Animation – Night Bus
- Short Film Special Jury Award for Ensemble Cast – A Wild Patience Has Taken Me Here
- Short Film Special Jury Award for Screenwriting – Stranger Than Rotterdam with Sara Driver
- Alfred P. Sloan Feature Film Prize – After Yang
- Sundance Institute/Amazon Studios Producers Award for Nonfiction – Su Kim for Free Chol Soo Lee
- Sundance Institute/Amazon Studios Producers Award for Fiction – Amanda Marshall for God's Country
- Sundance Institute/Adobe Mentorship Award for Editing Nonfiction – Toby Shimin
- Sundance Institute/Adobe Mentorship Award for Editing Fiction – Dody Dorn
- Sundance Institute/NHK Award – Hasan Hadi for The President's Cake

=== 2023 ===
- U.S. Grand Jury Prize: Dramatic Competition – A Thousand and One (A.V. Rockwell)
- U.S. Grand Jury Prize: Documentary Competition – Going to Mars: The Nikki Giovanni Project (Joe Brewster and Michèle Stephenson)
- World Cinema Grand Jury Prize: Dramatic Competition – Scrapper (Charlotte Regan)
- World Cinema Grand Jury Prize: Documentary Competition – The Eternal Memory (Maite Alberdi)
- Festival Favorite – Radical (Christopher Zalla)
- Audience Award: U.S. Dramatic – The Persian Version (Maryam Keshavarz)
- Audience Award: U.S. Documentary – Beyond Utopia (Madeleine Gavin)
- Audience Award: World Cinema Dramatic – Shayda (Noora Niasari)
- Audience Award: World Cinema Documentary – 20 Days in Mariupol (Mstyslav Chernov)
- Audience Award: NEXT – Kokomo City (D. Smith)
- Directing Award: U.S. Dramatic – Sing J. Lee for The Accidental Getaway Driver
- Directing Award: U.S. Documentary – Luke Lorentzen for A Still Small Voice
- Directing Award: World Cinema Dramatic – Marija Kavtaradze for Slow
- Directing Award: World Cinema Documentary – Anna Hints for Smoke Sauna Sisterhood
- Waldo Salt Screenwriting Award – Maryam Keshavarz for The Persian Version
- Jonathan Oppenheim Editing Award – Daniela I. Quiroz for Going Varsity in Mariachi
- NEXT Innovator Award – D. Smith for Kokomo City
- U.S. Dramatic Special Jury Award: Ensemble Cast – The cast of Theater Camp
- U.S. Dramatic Special Jury Award: Creative Vision – The creative team of Magazine Dreams
- World Cinema Dramatic Special Jury Award: Acting – Lío Mehiel for Mutt
- U.S. Documentary Special Jury Award: Clarity of Vision – The Stroll
- U.S. Documentary Special Jury Award: Freedom of Expression – Bad Press
- World Cinema Dramatic Special Jury Award: Creative Vision – Fantastic Machine
- World Cinema Documentary Special Jury Award: Excellence in Verité Filmmaking – Against the Tide
- World Cinema Dramatic Special Jury Award: Creative Vision – Sofia Alaoui for Animalia
- World Cinema Documentary Special Jury Award: Cinematography – Lílis Soares for Mami Wata
- Short Film Grand Jury Prize – When You Left Me On That Boulevard
- Short Film Jury Award: U.S. Fiction – Rest Stop
- Short Film Jury Award: International Fiction – The Kidnapping of the Bride
- Short Film Jury Award: Nonfiction – Will You Look At Me
- Short Film Jury Award: Animation – The Flying Sailor
- Short Film Special Jury Award, International: Directing – AliEN0089
- Short Film Special Jury Award, U.S.: Directing – The Vacation
- Alfred P. Sloan Feature Film Prize – The Pod Generation
- Sundance Institute/Amazon Studios Producers Award for Nonfiction – Jess Devaney for It's Only Life After All
- Sundance Institute/Amazon Studios Producers Award for Fiction – Kara Durrett for The Starling Girl
- Sundance Institute/Adobe Mentorship Award for Editing Nonfiction – Mary Manhardt
- Sundance Institute/Adobe Mentorship Award for Editing Fiction – Troy Takaki
- Sundance Institute/NHK Award – Olive Nwosu for Lady

=== 2024 ===
The following awards were given out:

- Grand Jury Prize: U.S. Dramatic – In the Summers (Alessandra Lacorazza Samudio)
- Grand Jury Prize: U.S. Documentary – Porcelain War (Brendan Bellomo and Slava Leontyev)
- World Cinema Dramatic – Sujo (Astrid Rondero and Fernanda Valadez)
- World Cinema Documentary – A New Kind of Wilderness (Silje Evensmo Jacobsen)
- Short Film – The Masterpiece (Alex Lora Cercos)
- Festival Favorite – Daughters (Angela Patton and Natalie Rae)
- Audience Award: U.S. Dramatic – Dìdi (弟弟) (Sean Wang)
- Audience Award: U.S. Documentary – Daughters (Angela Patton and Natalie Rae)
- World Cinema Dramatic – Girls Will Be Girls (Shuchi Talati)
- World Cinema Documentary – Ibelin (Benjamin Ree)
- NEXT – Kneecap (Rich Peppiatt)
- Directing Award: U.S. Dramatic – Alessandra Lacorazza for In the Summers
- Directing Award: U.S. Documentary – Julian Brave NoiseCat and Emily Kassie for Sugarcane
- World Cinema Dramatic – Raha Amirfazli and Alireza Ghasemi for In the Land of Brothers
- World Cinema Documentary – Benjamin Ree for Ibelin
- Waldo Salt Screenwriting Award – Jesse Eisenberg for A Real Pain
- Jonathan Oppenheim Editing Award: U.S. Documentary – Carla Gutiérrez for FRIDA
- NEXT Innovator Prize – Little Death
- U.S. Dramatic Special Jury Award: Ensemble Cast – The cast of Dìdi (弟弟)
- U.S. Dramatic Special Jury Award: Breakthrough Performance – Nico Parker for Suncoast
- U.S. Documentary Special Jury Award: The Art of Change – Union (Stephen Maing and Brett Story)
- U.S. Documentary Special Jury Award: Sound – Gaucho Gaucho
- World Cinema Dramatic Special Jury Award: Acting – Preeti Panigrahi for Girls Will Be Girls
- World Cinema Dramatic Special Jury Award: Original Music – Peter Raeburn for Handling the Undead
- World Cinema Documentary Special Jury Award: Cinematic Innovation – Johan Grimonprez for Soundtrack to a Coup d'Etat
- World Cinema Documentary Special Jury Award: Craft – Nocturnes
- NEXT Special Jury Award – Desire Lines
- Short Film Special Jury Prize for Directing – Masha Ko for The Looming
- Short Film Special Jury Prize for Directing – Makoto Nagahisa for Pisko the Crab Child is in Love
- U.S. Fiction: Say Hi After You Die (Kate Jean Hollowell)
- International Fiction: The Stag (An Chu)
- Nonfiction: Bob's Funeral (Jack Dunphy)
- Animation: Bug Diner (Phoebe Jane Hart)
- NHK Award: Saim Sadiq for We Are Never Going to Die
- Adobe Mentorship Award for Fiction: Pamela Martin
- Adobe Mentorship Award for Nonfiction: Kristina Motwani
- Amazon MGM Studios Producers Award for Fiction: Brad Becker-Parton for Stress Positions
- Amazon MGM Studios Producers Award for Nonfiction: Toni Kamau for The Battle for Laikipia
- Alfred P. Sloan Feature Film Prize: Love Me

=== 2025 ===
- U.S. Dramatic – Atropia by Hailey Gates
- U.S. Documentary – Seeds by Brittany Shyne
- World Cinema Dramatic – Cactus Pears by Rohan Parashuram Kanawade
- World Cinema Documentary – Cutting Through Rocks by Sara Khaki, Mohammadreza Eyni
- Short Film – The Flowers Stand Silently, Witnessing by Theo Panagopoulos
- U.S. Dramatic – Twinless by James Sweeney
- U.S. Documentary – André Is an Idiot by Tony Benna
- World Cinema Dramatic – DJ Ahmet by Georgi M. Unkovski
- World Cinema Documentary – Prime Minister by Michelle Walshe, Lindsay Utz
- NEXT – East of Wall by Kate Beecroft
- Directing Award: U.S. Dramatic – Rashad Frett for Ricky
- Directing Award: U.S. Documentary – Geeta Gandbhir for The Perfect Neighbor
- World Cinema Dramatic – Alireza Khatami for The Things You Kill
- Directing Award: World Cinema Documentary – Mstyslav Chernov for 2000 Meters to Andriivka
- Waldo Salt Screenwriting Award – Eva Victor for Sorry, Baby
- Jonathan Oppenheim Editing Award: U.S. Documentary – Parker Laramie for André is an Idiot
- NEXT Innovator Prize – Zodiac Killer Project by Charlie Shackleton
- U.S. Dramatic Special Jury Award for Ensemble Cast – The cast of Plainclothes
- US Dramatic Special Jury Award for Acting – Dylan O'Brien for Twinless
- U.S. Documentary Special Jury Award – Life After by Reid Davenport
- U.S. Documentary Special Jury Award for Archival Storytelling – Selena y Los Dinos by Isabel Castro
- World Cinema Documentary Special Jury Award – Mr. Nobody Against Putin by David Borenstein
- World Cinema Documentary Special Jury Award for Freedom of Expression – Coexistence, My Ass! by Amber Fares
- World Cinema Dramatic Special Jury Award for Creative Vision – Georgi M. Unkovski for DJ Ahmet
- World Cinema Dramatic Special Jury Award for Writing – Two Women by Chloé Robichaud and Catherine Léger
- Next: Special Jury Award for Ensemble Cast – Mad Bills to Pay (or Destiny, dile que no soy malo) by Joel Alfonso Vargas
- U.S. Fiction – Trokas Duras by Jazmin Garcia
- Short Film Special Jury Award for Directing Loren Waters – for Tiger
- Short Film Special Jury Award for Animation Directing – May Kindred-Boothby for The Eating of an Orange
- Short Film Jury Award: Animation – Natalia León for Como si la tierra se las hubiera tragado
- Short Film Jury Award: Nonfiction – Christopher Radcliff for We Were the Scenery
- Short Film Jury Award: International Fiction – Chheangkea for Grandma Nai Who Played Favorites
- Festival Favorite Award: Come See Me in the Good Light by Ryan White

=== 2026 ===
The following awards were given out:

- Grand Jury Prize: U.S. Dramatic – Josephine (Beth de Araújo)
- Grand Jury Prize: U.S. Documentary – Nuisance Bear (Gabriela Osio Vanden, Jack Weisman)
- World Cinema Dramatic – Shame and Money (Visar Morina)
- World Cinema Documentary – To Hold a Mountain (Biljana Tutorov, Petar Glomazić)
- NEXT Innovator Award – The Incomer (Louis Paxton)
- Audience Award: U.S. Dramatic – Josephine (Beth de Araújo)
- Audience Award: U.S. Documentary – American Pachuco: The Legend of Luis Valdez (David Alvarado)
- Audience Award: World Cinema Dramatic – HOLD ONTO ME (Κράτα Με) (Myrsini Aristidou)
- Audience Award: World Cinema Documentary – One In A Million (Itab Azzam, Jack MacInnes)
- Audience Award: NEXT – Aanikoobijigan (Adam Khalil, Zack Khalil)
- Directing Award: U.S. Dramatic – Josef Kubota Wladyka for Ha-chan, Shake Your Booty!
- Directing Award: U.S. Documentary – J.M. Harper for Soul Patrol
- World Cinema Dramatic – Andrius Blaževičius for How to Divorce During the War
- World Cinema Documentary – Itab Azzam and Jack MacInnes for One In A Million
- Waldo Salt Screenwriting Award – Liz Sargent for Take Me Home
- Jonathan Oppenheim Editing Award: U.S. Documentary – Matt Hixon for Barbara Forever
- U.S. Dramatic Special Jury Award for Debut Feature – Bedford Park (Stephanie Ahn)
- U.S. Dramatic Special Jury Award for Ensemble Cast – The Friend's House Is Here
- U.S. Documentary Special Jury Award for Journalistic Excellence – Who Killed Alex Odeh?
- U.S. Documentary Special Jury Award for Impact for Change – The Lake
- World Cinema Dramatic Special Jury Award for Creative Vision – Filipiñana (Rafael Manuel)
- World Cinema Dramatic Special Jury Award for Acting Ensemble – LADY (Olive Nwosu)
- World Cinema Documentary Special Jury Award for Journalistic Impact – Birds of War
- World Cinema Documentary Special Jury Award for Civil Resistance – Everybody To Kenmure Street
- NEXT Special Jury Award for Creative Expression – TheyDream (William David Caballero)
- Short Film Grand Jury Prize – The Baddest Speechwriter of All (Ben Proudfoot, Stephen Curry)
- Short Film Jury Award: U.S. Fiction – Crisis Actor (Lily Platt)
- Short Film Jury Award: International Fiction – Jazz Infernal (Will Niava)
- Short Film Jury Award: Nonfiction – The Boys and the Bees (Arielle C. Knight)
- Short Film Jury Award: Animation – Living with a Visionary (Stephen P. Neary)
- Short Film Special Jury Award for Creative Vision – Paper Trail (Don Hertzfeldt)
- Short Film Special Jury Award for Acting – Noah Roja and Filippo Carrozza for The Liars
- Alfred P. Sloan Feature Film Prize – In The Blink of An Eye (Andrew Stanton)
- Amazon MGM Studios Producers Award for Fiction – Apoorva Guru Charan (Take Me Home)
- Amazon MGM Studios Producers Award for Nonfiction – Dawne Langford (Who Killed Alex Odeh?)
- Adobe Mentorship Award for Fiction – Mollie Goldstein
- Adobe Mentorship Award for Nonfiction – Flavia de Souza
- NHK Award – Leo Aguirre (Verano)
