= Grand Jury Prize (disambiguation) =

Grand Jury Prize usually refers to a film award in a film festival.

It may refer to a specific award, including:

- Grand Jury Prize (Venice Film Festival), an award given at the Venice Film Festival, second place award to the Golden Lion
- Silver Bear Grand Jury Prize, an award given at the Berlin International Film Festival, second place award to the Golden Bear
- Sundance Grand Jury Prize, one of two top awards at the Sundance Film Festival:
  - Grand Jury Prize Documentary
  - Grand Jury Prize Dramatic
