= Parle =

Parle may refer to:

Places

- Vile Parle, a suburb of Mumbai, India
- Parle (Chandgad), a village located in the city of Kolhapur

Companies and products:

- Parle Products, an Indian company
  - Parle-G a brand of biscuits manufactured by Parle Products
- Parle Agro, an Indian company that split from Parle Products

Other:

- Berthia Monica Parle, Saint Lucian hotelier and senator
- Luan Parle (21st century), Irish folk singer
- USS Parle (DE-708), a Rudderow class destroyer escort

== See also ==
- Parlay (disambiguation)
- Parley (disambiguation)
- Parler (disambiguation)
- Parly
