= Girls Like Us =

Girls Like Us may refer to:

- Girls Like Us (film), 1997 documentary film
- "Girls Like Us" (B-15 Project song), 2000
- "Girls Like Us" (Zoe Wees song), 2021
- "Girls Like Us", a song by Twice from their EP Fancy You
- "Locals (Girls Like Us)", a song by Underscores from her album Wallsocket
- "Girls Like Us", an episode of the TV series Sight Unseen
