= Joel DeMott =

American film director (1947-2025)

- Born: April 22, 1947; Washington, D.C., U.S.
- Died: June 13, 2025 (aged 78); Montgomery, Alabama, U.S.
- Education: Radcliffe College
- Occupation: Documentary filmmaker
- Years active: 1970s–1980s
- Works: Seventeen

Joel "Jo" Heyward DeMott (April 22, 1947 – June 13, 2025) was an American documentary film director. She is known for the independent cinéma vérité films she made in collaboration with Jeff Kreines, Seventeen and Demon Lover Diary.

== Life and career ==
=== Early life ===
DeMott was born on April 22, 1947, in Washington, DC, and raised in Amherst, Massachusetts. Her father, Benjamin DeMott, was a cultural critic and professor at Amherst College. Joel was named for the character Jo March from Little Women, one of her mother's favorite books. She attended public school in Amherst before attending an English school in Portugal for a "happy year," and what she described as a "girls’ cloister in Northampton" for "three miserable years".

DeMott earned a bachelor's degree in English at Radcliffe College, graduating in 1967. In her own words, she had an "unspectacular academic career" and "spent most of the time directing plays." After college, she hitchhiked around Europe and the southern United States and worked various jobs: teaching high school English literature and Greek history, hotel chambermaid, grading economics papers, and worked briefly as an assistant at the Museum of Fine Arts Boston. For several years worked at The New York Times, including as assistant to Seymour Peck. She also lived in Northern Ireland.

In 1972, she studied at Massachusetts Institute of Technology (MIT) as a special student in filmmaking, taking classes with the documentary filmmakers Richard Leacock and Ed Pincus. In equipment room at MIT, she met Jeff Kreines, who would become her partner in life and filmmaking. She then worked as a film editor for WCVB-TV in Boston and in a printing plant as a stitcher. After earning enough money to buy a camera, she left those jobs.

=== Documentary career ===
DeMott and Kreines shot their first film together, Vince and Mary Ann Get Married, about a mafia wedding in Cicero, Illinois. Ed Pincus said the film was "one of the most beautiful documentaries ever."

Kreines was hired by factory worker and first-time director Donald G. Jackson as cameraman for his feature The Demon Lover (1976), a low budget horror film which would shoot in Michigan. Kreines and DeMott drove to Michigan, and DeMott documented the journey and production in her second film Demon Lover Diary, which was released in 1980. The film was praised by critics and won the 1980 Los Angeles Film Critics Association’s Independent/Experimental Film and Video Award, sharing the prize with Journeys From Berlin by Yvonne Rainer, a category which was introduced that year.

The duo's third film, Seventeen, followed teenagers during their senior year, 1980-1981, at Muncie Southside High School in Muncie, Indiana. The film was scheduled to be the final part of the PBS documentary television series Middletown on life in Muncie, created and produced by Peter Davis, airing as the final episode in 1982. However, the series' sponsor, Xerox, withdrew their support for the episode after seeing a three minute trailer for the film. DeMott and Kreines refused to bleep profanity and remove scenes that contained interracial romance. Under pressure from Xerox, some of the parents of the teenagers in the film, and the local public television station, WIPB, Davis withdrew the film and it was suppressed by PBS. DeMott wrote a 25-page statement on the film, Xerox, and PBS. They then took the film on tour, showing it at film festivals, universities, and museums. Seventeen received the Grand Jury Prize Documentary at the 1985 Sundance Film Festival.

DeMott and Kreines shot additional films in the 1970s and 80s, but they have yet to be completed and released. Goldbug Street, shot in 1976, is set for a 2027 release.

=== Later career ===
She and Kreines were cinematographers on D.A. Pennebaker's episodes of the 1979 television program The Energy War and on his 1989 documentary Depeche Mode 101. DeMott assisted her father, Benjamin DeMott, with research for three books.

=== Personal life ===
DeMott lived in Coosada, Alabama. She collected outsider art with her partner, Jeff Kreines.

== Death ==
DeMott died on June 13, 2025 in Montgomery, Alabama of chronic obstructive pulmonary disease.

== Style and influence ==
Kreines and DeMott developed a 16mm camera rig, improving on Ed Pincus's setup, that rested on the operator's shoulder with a lightweight Nagra SN, a one-pound tape recorder which had been developed for the CIA, on the side of the camera and a small hand-held microphone to capture synchronous audio. This setup allowed a single operator to record both picture and sound simultaneously. This "demystified the filmmaking process for the people being filmed". In DeMott's words, it turned the "Technical Monster back into a human being; acknowledged as a presence, responding autonomously."

DeMott and Kreines did not interview their subjects, ask them to do things nor ask them questions. Their approach "was to hang out, shoot, and be themselves." In order to "approximate human perspective," they did not use zooms and shot with a 10mm lens, typically from 1.5 to 3 feet away. They did not use cutaways. This resulted in the "viewer sens[ing] the filmmaker’s physical presence and real-time decision-making in every frame."

In the Journal of Film and Video, filmmaker Mark Rance wrote that DeMott not only wanted to make "sophisticated documentaries about family life," but was also, "looking to create a kind of documentary that was like literature, full of the twists and turns provided by characters you really get to know by SEEING what they are like." Rance wrote that their technique, "emphasizes the frame and the relationship of the filmmaker to the subject."

Pennebaker and Chris Hegedus put Demon Lover Diary on a list of the best documentaries of all time for the 1997 International Documentary Film Festival Amsterdam. In 2008, Film Comment described Demon Lover Diary and Seventeen as "positively crucial to documentary film history."

Director Kelly Reichardt wrote to DeMott after seeing Demon Lover Diary: "It would have changed my life if I would have seen that image of you in the mirror holding that camera in 1975 when I was 11 years old. It feels startling and important to me now at age 54." Ross McElwee credited DeMott and Kreines's work as an inspiration for Sherman’s March. According to Documentary, "DeMott created a model of intimate cinema vérité filmmaking that has inspired countless filmmakers."

== Filmography ==
=== Director ===
- Vince and Mary Ann Get Married
- Montgomery Songs (1976)
- 36 Girls (1976)
- Down on the Farm (1977)
- God & Country (1978)
- Demon Lover Diary (1980)
- Seventeen (1983)
- A Simple Trip (1984) (Note: DeMott received a grant in 1984 for this film, but a later source does not attach a date to it.)
- Goldbug Street (2027)

Only Demon Lover Diary and Seventeen are publicly available, with Goldbug Street scheduled for a 2027 release.

=== Cinematographer ===
- The Energy War (1979)
- Depeche Mode 101 (1989)
