= Parlour (disambiguation) =

A parlour is a kind of room.

Parlour or parlor may also refer to:

- Parlour music, type of popular music which, as the name suggests, is intended to be performed in the parlours of middle-class homes by amateur singers
- Ray Parlour (born 1973), English footballer
- Parlour (ice cream), by Nestlé
- Parlor (film), 2014 horror film
- The Parlour, opera 1966
- The Parlor, an American music duo
- Parlour Club, a venue in West Hollywood, California
- Ice cream parlor

== See also ==
- Parler (disambiguation)
