= Parmly =

Parmly is a surname. Notable people with the surname include:

- Eleazer Parmly (1797–1874), American dentist
- Jahial Parmly Paret (1870–1952), American tennis player and writer
- Michael E. Parmly (born 1951), American diplomat

== See also ==
- Parly (surname)
