= Parlez-vous =

Parlez-vous or similar terms may refer to:

== Arts and media ==
=== Songs ===
- "Parlez Vous", an alternative name for the c. 1915 World War I song "Mademoiselle from Armentières", also known as "Inky Pinky Parlez Vous" and similar
- "Parlez-vous anglais", a 2020 song by Headie One featuring Aitch
- "Parlez-vous français?" (Baccara song), 1978
- "Parlez Vous Francais?" (Art vs. Science song), 2009
- "Parlez-vous Francais?", a 1963 song by the American-German pop singer Bill Ramsey
- "Parlez-vous Freezepop?", a song by the American electronic band Freezepop on the 2004 album Fancy Ultra Fresh
- "Parlez Vous Rap", a song performed by Daveed Diggs for the 2016 Disney animated film Zootopia
- "Me non parlez vous français", a song by the Spanish synth-pop band Mecano originally intended for the 1984 album Ya viene el Sol

=== Albums ===
- Parlez-Vous English, a 1979 album by The Broughtons
- Parlez-Vous Hate?, a 2021 album by Rome

=== Films ===
- Parlez Vous, a 1930 short film by Stanley Bergerman
- "Parlez Vous Woo", a 1956 short film in the Popeye the Sailor film series
- Mademoiselle Parley Voo, a 1928 British silent drama film, a sequel to the 1926 film Mademoiselle from Armentieres

=== Television series episodes ===
- "Parlez Vous?", a 1978 TV episode of The Love Boat
- "Parlez-Vous English", a 1960 episode of the American sitcom television series The Many Loves of Dobie Gillis
- "Parlez-Vous Flavor?", a 2008 episode of the Flavor of Love American reality television series starring Flavor Flav

== Other uses ==
- "Parlez-vous français?", an example of an expression in the French language
- Parlez-vous franglais?, a 1964 denunciation of Franglais language blending by René Étiemble
- Parley, a discussion

== See also ==
- "When Yankee Doodle Learns to 'Parlez Vous Français' ", a 1917 World War I song
- Parlez-moi d'amour (disambiguation)
- Parler (disambiguation)
- Parley (disambiguation)
