= John Joseph Parle =

Naval Reserve Officer from (1942-1943)

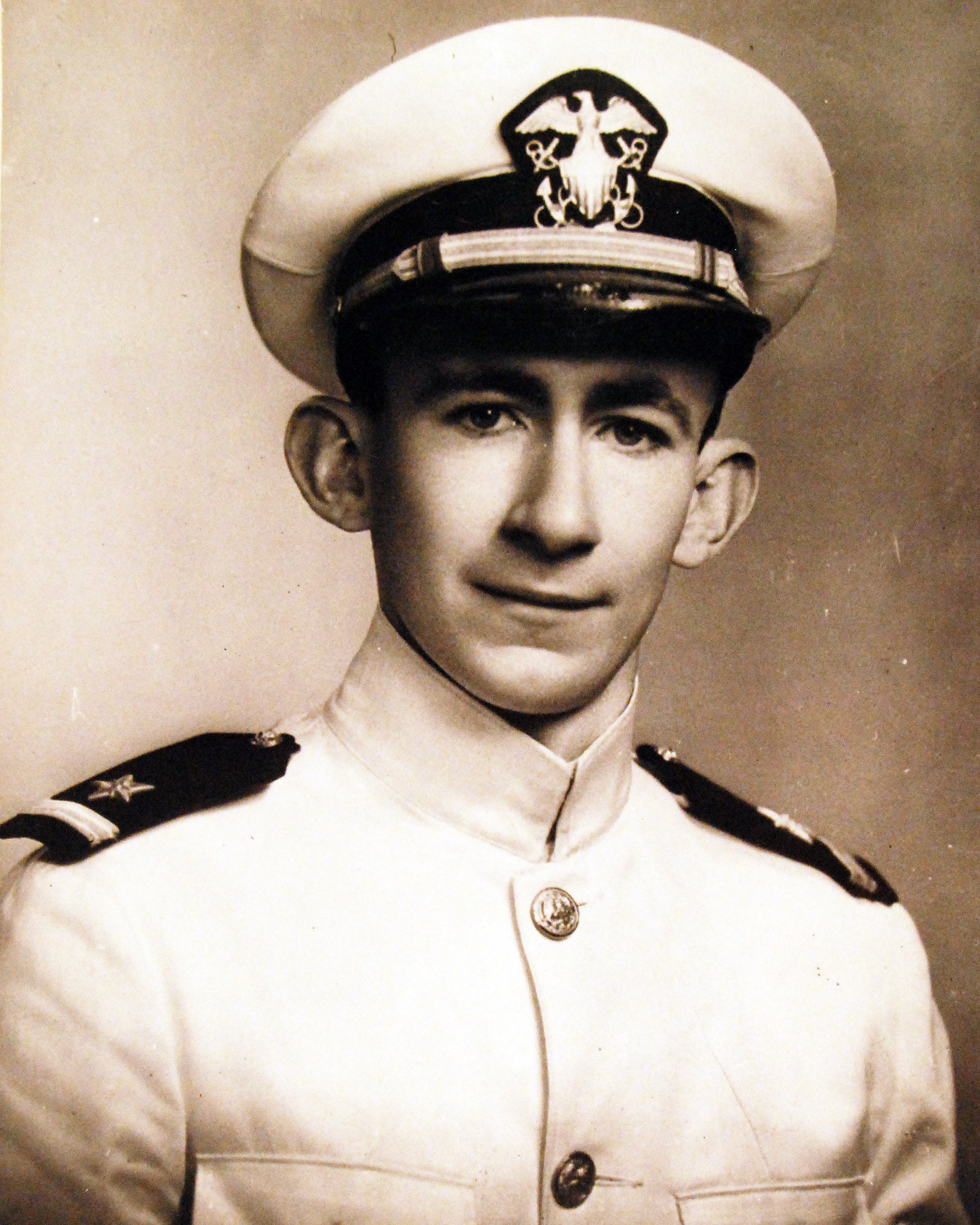
- Born: May 26, 1920; Omaha, Nebraska, US
- Died: July 17, 1943 (aged 23) off Sicily, Italy
- Burial place: Holy Sepulchre Cemetery, Omaha, Nebraska
- Military career
- Allegiance: United States of America
- Branch: United States Naval Reserve
- Service years: 1942 - 1943
- Rank: Ensign
- Unit: USS LST-375
- Conflicts: World War II
- Awards: Medal of Honor Purple Heart

John Joseph Parle (May 26, 1920 – July 17, 1943) was a United States Naval Reserve officer and a recipient of the United States military's highest decoration—the Medal of Honor—for his actions in World War II. Parle was a 1942 ROTC graduate of Creighton University in Omaha, Nebraska.

On July 9, 1943, Parle was serving as an ensign and was involved in the preparations for the Allied invasion of Sicily. On that day, he noticed a fire aboard a small boat loaded with explosives and ammunition. Knowing that an explosion would alert the defenders on Sicily of the impending invasion, he rushed to put out the fire. Although successful in dousing the flames, he later died of smoke inhalation.

Parle, aged 23 at his death, was buried at the Holy Sepulchre Cemetery in his birth city of Omaha, Nebraska.

== Medal of Honor citation ==
Ensign Parle's official Medal of Honor citation reads:

For valor and courage above and beyond the call of duty as Officer-in-Charge of Small Boats in the USS LST-375 during the amphibious assault on the island of Sicily, 9–10 July 1943. Realizing that a detonation of explosives would prematurely disclose to the enemy the assault about to be carried out, and with full knowledge of the peril involved, Ens. Parle unhesitatingly risked his life to extinguish a smoke pot accidentally ignited in a boat carrying charges of high explosives, detonating fuses and ammunition. Undaunted by fire and blinding smoke, he entered the craft, quickly snuffed out a burning fuse, and after failing in his desperate efforts to extinguish the fire pot, finally seized it with both hands and threw it over the side. Although he succumbed a week later from smoke and fumes inhaled, Ens. Parle's heroic self-sacrifice prevented grave damage to the ship and personnel and insured the security of a vital mission. He gallantly gave his life in the service of his country.

== Awards and decorations ==

| 1st row | Medal of Honor | | Purple Heart |
| 3rd row | American Campaign Medal | European–African–Middle Eastern Campaign Medal with 1 Campaign star | World War II Victory Medal |

== See also ==
- USS Parle
- List of Medal of Honor recipients
