= Parlay (disambiguation) =

A parlay is a gambling term, a single bet that links together two or more individual wagers and is dependent on all of those wagers winning together.

Parlay may also refer to:

- Parlay Group, a technical industry consortium
- Parlay X, a set of standard Web service APIs for the telephone network

== See also ==
- Parley, a discussion or conference
- Par Par Lay (1947–2013), Burmese entertainer
- Parley (disambiguation)
- Parler (disambiguation)
- Parle (disambiguation)
- Parly
