= Benjamin DeMott =

American English professor and cultural critic (1924–2005)

Benjamin Haile DeMott (June 2, 1924, Rockville Centre, New York – September 29, 2005, Worthington, Mass.) was an American English professor and cultural critic. The author of more than a dozen books, DeMott was known for his cultural criticism in popular magazines and a trilogy, The Imperial Middle: Why Americans Can't Think Straight about Class (1990), The Trouble with Friendship: Why Americans Can't Think Straight about Race (1995), and Killer Woman Blues: Why Americans Can't Think Straight about Gender (2000).

He wrote glowingly of Otis Redding, the Beatles' "Blue Jay Way" and "the supergorgeous Mantovanian Motown Sound", while mocking Marshall McLuhan and Mary Ellmann.

One of DeMott's last pieces was a scalding dissection of the 9/11 Commission Report that appeared in Harper's Magazine in 2004. His final piece, "Battling the Hard Man: Notes on Addiction to the Pornography of Violence", was published in Harper's in August 2007.

DeMott taught English at Amherst College for more than 40 years. He graduated from George Washington University (BA) and Harvard University (PHD).

DeMott was survived by Margaret, whom he married in 1946, and their four children. He was the father of documentary filmmaker Joel DeMott.
