= Parley (disambiguation) =

Parley is a discussion conference.

Parley or variant, may also refer to:

== Places ==
- Parley Lake, Carver County, Minnesota, USA
- Parleys Canyon, Utah, USA
- Parley's Trail, Salt Lake County, Utah, USA
- Parley Common, Ferndown, Dorset, Hampshire, England, UK

== People ==
=== Surname ===
- Peter Parley (1793–1869), U.S. author
- Alexander Parley Johnson, namesake of the Casa de Parley Johnson, Downey, California, USA

=== Given name ===
- Parley Baer (1914–2002), American actor
- Parley P. Christensen (1869–1954), American politician
- Parley Davis, namesake of the Parley Davis House, East Montpelier, Vermont, USA
- Parley Finch (1844–1927), American politician
- Parley Gulbrandsen (1889–1959), Norwegian missionary
- Parley G. Hellewell (born 1950), American politician
- Parley Hunt, namesake of the Parley Hunt House, Bunkerville, Nevada, USA
- Parley P. Pratt (1807–1857), a Mormon leader

== Other uses ==
- Adidas Parley, the Parley clothing collection from Adidas

== See also ==
- East Parley, Hurn, Dorset, Hampshire, England, UK
- West Parley, Dorset, Hampshire, England, UK
- Parley for the Oceans, a non-profit NGO for oceanic environmental protection
- Parley Voo (disambiguation)
- Parlez vous (disambiguation)
- Parlay (disambiguation)
- Parle (disambiguation)
- Parler (disambiguation)
- Parly
