= 1980 Los Angeles Film Critics Association Awards =

Annual US film awards ceremony

6th LAFCA Awards
- Date: December 20, 1980

Highlights
- Best Picture: Raging Bull

The 6th Los Angeles Film Critics Association Awards, honoring the best filmmaking of 1980, were announced on 20 December 1980 and given on 9 January 1981.

== Winners ==
- Best Picture:
  - Raging Bull
- Best Director:
  - Roman Polanski – Tess
  - Runner-up: Richard Rush – The Stunt Man
- Best Actor:
  - Robert De Niro – Raging Bull
  - Runner-up: John Hurt – The Elephant Man
- Best Actress:
  - Sissy Spacek – Coal Miner's Daughter
  - Runner-up: Mary Tyler Moore – Ordinary People
- Best Supporting Actor:
  - Timothy Hutton – Ordinary People
  - Runner-up: Joe Pesci – Raging Bull
- Best Supporting Actress:
  - Mary Steenburgen – Melvin and Howard
- Best Screenplay:
  - John Sayles – Return of the Secaucus 7
- Best Cinematography:
  - Ghislain Cloquet and Geoffrey Unsworth – Tess
- Best Music Score:
  - Ry Cooder – The Long Riders
- Best Foreign Film:
  - The Tin Drum (Die Blechtrommel) • West Germany/France/Poland/Yugoslavia
- Experimental/Independent Film/Video Award (tie):
  - Yvonne Rainer – Journeys from Berlin/1971
  - Joel DeMott – Demon Lover Diary
- New Generation Award:
  - Carroll Ballard
- Career Achievement Award:
  - Robert Mitchum
