= Aziza (2019 film) =

- Directed by: Soudade Kaadan
- Written by: Soudade Kaadan
- Produced by: KAF Production
- Starring: Abdel Mounaem Amayri; Caresse Bashar
- Edited by: Soudade Kaadan
- Release date: January 25, 2019
- Running time: 13 minutes
- Country: Lebanon
- Language: Arabic

Aziza is a 2019 short film directed by Soudade Kaadan and produced by KAF Production. It premiered on January 25, 2019 at the Sundance Film Festival and was awarded the Short Film Grand Jury Prize.

== Plot ==
Ayman, a migrant from Syria living in Lebanon is instructing his wife to drive the car that is what is left of his country in his life.
