= USS Parle =

Rudderow-class destroyer escort

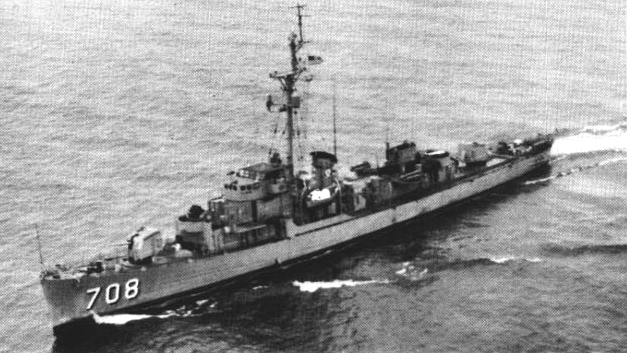
- USS Parle (DE-708) underway on Lake Michigan c1968

History

United States
- Name: USS Parle
- Namesake: John Joseph Parle
- Ordered: 1942
- Builder: Defoe Shipbuilding Company, Bay City, Michigan
- Laid down: 8 January 1944
- Launched: 25 March 1944
- Commissioned: 29 July 1944
- Decommissioned: 10 July 1946
- Recommissioned: 2 March 1951
- Decommissioned: 1 July 1970
- Fate: Sunk as a target off the Florida coast, 27 October 1970

General characteristics
- Class & type: Rudderow-class destroyer escort
- Displacement: 1,450 long tons (1,473 t) light; 1,673 long tons (1,700 t) standard
- Length: 306 ft (93 m)
- Beam: 37 ft (11 m)
- Draft: 13 ft 9 in (4.19 m)
- Propulsion: Turbo-electric drive, 12,000 hp (8.9 MW)
- Speed: 24 knots (44 km/h; 28 mph)
- Complement: 221
- Armament: 2 × single 5"/38 caliber guns; 2 × twin 40 mm guns; 10 × single 20 mm guns; 1 × triple 21-inch (533 mm) torpedo tubes; 1 × Hedgehog anti-submarine mortar; 8 × K-gun depth charge projectors; 2 × depth charge tracks

USS Parle (DE-708), a Rudderow-class destroyer escort of the United States Navy, was laid down on 8 January 1944 at the Defoe Shipbuilding Company, in Bay City, Michigan. She was launched on 25 March 1944, sponsored by Mrs. Harry V. Parle, mother of Medal of Honor recipient Ensign John Joseph Parle, and commissioned in New Orleans on 29 July 1944.

== Service history ==
=== World War II, 1944–1945 ===
After shakedown off Louisiana and Bermuda, Parle was assigned to the Atlantic Fleet for convoy duty, completing one Atlantic-Mediterranean voyage before her permanent assignment to Escort Division 60. Then, she returned to the yards to be fitted out for Pacific duty. On 28 December, she sailed for Panama, arriving there on 3 January 1945. After sailing to the South Pacific and reporting for duty with the 7th Fleet, she was assigned to the Philippine Sea Frontier, and routed to Leyte by way of Galapagos, Bora Bora, Manus and Palau.

As an escort with Task Unit 94.18.12, she carried out numerous operations between Kossol Roads, Leyte, Lingayen, Subic, New Guinea, Okinawa, Ulithi, and Hollandia. Although engaging in repeated attack runs on sound contacts during these escort assignments, she never made positive contact with the enemy.

=== Post-war activities, 1945–1946 ===
In August 1945, Parle was with the Amphibious Forces of the Pacific Fleet engaged in escorting occupation troops to Korea. In January 1946, she joined the Atlantic Reserve Fleet at Green Cove Springs, Florida, and decommissioned on 10 July.

=== 1951–1970 ===
Parle recommissioned on 2 March 1951 at Green Cove Springs, Florida, and following shakedown, operated with the Atlantic Fleet out of Norfolk, Virginia and Nova Scotia. During the first quarter of 1952, she underwent training at Guantanamo Bay and was then sent to Key West, in March, for duty as a training ship with the Fleet Sonar School. The latter part of the year found her in the North Atlantic and Baltic Sea areas engaged in fleet exercises.

The succeeding years, through 1958, were spent in training in anti-submarine warfare tactics out of Guantanamo, off the Virginia Capes, and Norfolk with interim periods for overhaul and readiness evaluations. Parle periodically provided services to the Fleet Sonar School and type commanders.

On 1 January 1959, Parle was transferred to the operational control of the Commandant, 5th Naval District and designated as a Naval Reserve Training Ship, Group 1. Her complement was reduced, and she was assigned a mobilization crew of Reservists for training and augmentation. As a training ship for the reservists, she conducted year-round schedules of two-week cruises, other than periods for upkeep.

During a heightening of world tensions in August 1961, President John F. Kennedy called for partial mobilization of the Reserves. Parle received her reserve crew on 21 October, bringing her to full complement, and she commenced a year of duty with the active fleet. Following additional training to peak the performance of her new crew, Parle assumed patrol duties in the Caribbean.

In July 1962, Parle detached the Reserve crew, and reverted to inactive status as a Reserve Training Ship. In August, she was placed in service in reserve, and retained in a training capacity. She has since continued her training duties, operating from her Great Lakes home port of Chicago, Illinois, and into 1970, Parle continued a vital service to the U.S. Navy and the U.S. Naval Reserve Training Program.

=== Fate ===
On 1 July 1970 Parle was decommissioned at Norfolk, Virginia and struck from the Naval Vessel Register after 20 years and 4 months of total service. She was the last commissioned U.S. Navy ship based on the Great Lakes and the last WWII era destroyer escort in service.

On 27 October 1970, Parle was sunk as target off the coast of Florida.

== Awards ==
- Navy Expeditionary Medal
- American Campaign Medal
- Asiatic-Pacific Campaign Medal
- European-African-Middle Eastern Campaign Medal
- World War II Victory Medal
- Navy Occupation Medal with "ASIA" clasp
- National Defense Service Medal with star

== See also ==
- List of destroyer escorts of the United States Navy
