= Irish Folk Furniture =

- Directed by: Tony Donoghue
- Written by: Tony Tonoghue
- Produced by: Cathal Black
- Starring: Mary Brannigan; Eddie Coen; Patrick Cahalan; Mikey Cahalan; Sean Gleeson
- Edited by: Ed Smith
- Music by: David Kitt
- Release dates: 9 November 2012 (Red Rock Film Festival); 18 January 2013 (Sundance); 8 February 2013 (Glasgow Film Festival)
- Running time: 9 minutes
- Country: Ireland

Irish Folk Furniture is a 2012 short animated film directed by Tony Donoghue which won the prize for Best Animation at the 2013 Sundance Film Festival. It uses stop-motion animation to breathe life into the disregarded pieces of furniture that frequently lie rotting in Irish barns and sheds, showing the process of renovating them and returning them to the homes they once inhabited. The short was produced by Cathal Black under the IFB 'Frameworks' animated short film scheme.
