= Parler (disambiguation) =

Parler is a social networking service known for hosting right-wing content.

Parler may also refer to:

== Music ==
- "Parler à mon père", a 2012 song by Celine Dion
- "Parler tout bas", a 2001 song by Alizée

== People ==
- Parler family, a family of German architects and sculptors from the 14th century
  - Heinrich Parler (c. 1300 – c. 1370), German architect and sculptor
  - Peter Parler (1333–1399), son of Heinrich
  - Wenzel Parler (1360–1404), son of Peter
  - Johann Parler (1359–1400s), son of Peter

== Other uses ==
- 6550 Parléř, a minor planet

== See also ==
- Parlour (disambiguation)
- Parlay (disambiguation)
- Parle (disambiguation)
- Parley (disambiguation)
- Parly
