= Frat House =

1998 documentary

- Cover art of the bootleg DVD release
- Directed by: Todd Phillips; Andrew Gurland
- Narrated by: Todd Phillips
- Music by: J. F. Coleman
- Country of origin: United States
- Original language: English

Production
- Producers: Todd Phillips; Andrew Gurland
- Cinematography: Anthony Hardwick; W. Mott Hupfel
- Editor: Salamo Levin
- Running time: 60 minutes
- Production companies: Todd & Andrew

Original release
- Network: HBO
- Release: January 21, 1998

Frat House is a 1998 documentary that explores the darker side of fraternity life and hazing. The film, directed by Todd Phillips and Andrew Gurland, focuses on the pledging process through a composite of different fraternities. It was mostly filmed at the Alpha Tau Omega fraternity house at Muhlenberg College in Allentown, Pennsylvania. Alpha Tau Omega's charter was revoked two years later in 2000, though it has since been reinstated. The documentary also features scenes of the Beta Chi and Tau Kappa Epsilon fraternities on the campus of SUNY Oneonta in Oneonta, New York.

The film premiered at the 1998 Sundance Film Festival to acclaim, winning the Grand Jury Prize for Documentary. HBO Films acquired the distribution rights and planned to air it that year, but after subsequent allegations that some of the film's content was staged for the camera, as well as concerns from fraternity members about their depiction in the film, HBO cancelled the airing. The film never received an official release, though bootleg versions have occasionally circulated online.

== Synopsis ==
In an opening voiceover, co-director Todd Phillips says he was told that a film like this couldn't be made.

At SUNY Oneonta, Phillips and co-director Andrew Gurland meet a fraternity brother of Beta Chi who goes by the name of Blossom. Blossom tells the cameras that hazing is "like having the power of a god," and that one of his frat's hazing rituals includes biting the head off a rat. The film shows a candlelit initiation ceremony where new pledges are taught the fraternal code. In voiceover, Phillips says the point of this is to make the pledges feel like they already belong and that good times are ahead. However, the formalities are intended to motivate the pledges to endure the imminent process of hazing.

During the pledges' Hell Week, they are forced to wear uniforms, wake up at all hours, engage in strenuous physical activities, and chug beers on demand. In his voiceover, Phillips reveals that some frat members have grown uncomfortable with outsiders filming their exploits. Phillips decides to take a risk and shows up to a skeptical frat house unannounced. When he and his crew arrive, they discover pledges being blindfolded and tricked into believing they'll be branded with a hot iron. Shortly after witnessing this, Phillips and company are kicked out and told they can no longer film at the frat house. Blossom tells Phillips it's best if the film crew leaves town and ceases production. Some frat members then trash the crew's production van, painting the word "Die" on its side. When Phillips calls Blossom for an explanation, Blossom threatens to kill him.

After giving up on filming at Blossom's fraternity, Phillips and Gurland go to Muhlenberg College in Allentown, Pennsylvania and meet with a second fraternity. When they explain to the brothers of Sigma Alpha Mu, also known as "Sammy", that they are filming a documentary on fraternity life, the brothers allow them to film the entirety of their hazing rituals on the condition that they participate in the pledging process. For Phillips, this involves being locked inside a dog crate where he has beer, spit, and cigarette ashes thrown on him. Gurland's experience lands him in a hospital due to stomach pain and he drops out of the proceedings.

== Background ==
Phillips said it was not his or Gurland's intention as filmmakers to make a "sweeping [exposé] about fraternities or [make a case] that they should be outlawed." He said, "The movie is about hazing and rituals and the things men go through to belong. Everybody's so afraid of standing out in this world that they will even get beat up and peed on and thrown up on just to be part of a group, which is pathetic." Phillips said the intention was for viewers to come away with a better understanding of why people would put themselves through the mental and physical anguish of hazing in order to belong.

Said Phillips, "When you actually go through the hazing, you sort of understand why they do it. It really does increase the bonding with your fellow pledges, like going through a war. That's really what they're trying to do. They're not trying to lock people in trunks and kill them. They're trying to form a bond that will outlast college."

== Release ==
Frat House premiered at the Sundance Film Festival on January 21, 1998, and was awarded the Grand Jury Prize for Documentary. After HBO's acquiring of the film, criticisms of the film surfaced from the fraternity brothers documented, as well as from national fraternity groups concerned about what their members were shown doing on camera. Muhlenberg College criticized the documentary for including scenes that it contends were staged, saying, "This was promoted as a documentary. Clearly, it is fiction. The scenes were staged, and people were paid to act out scenes." Among the allegations was that the humiliated "pledges" in the film were actually Alpha Tau Omega members posing as pledges.

One Muhlenberg student involved in the filming claimed, "[The filmmakers] told us exactly what to do. They’d call and say, ‘We’re coming in, like, two hours; think of some stuff we could do.' When it came out as a documentary, I was shocked because [our segment] was all staged. They would retake scenes and everything." HBO planned to air the documentary in August 1998, but the film was pulled from its schedule. That December, HBO announced they would not air the film, citing claims from Alpha Tau Omega of the documentary's alleged fabrication.

Phillips denied that scenes were redone multiple times, explaining, "What people don't understand about good documentary filmmaking is, it's screenwriting. You write the movie before you show up. And you manipulate everybody in the room to say exactly what you want them to say. That, I'm guilty of. That is how I make documentaries. Because you know what? Fly on the wall filmmaking has gone out the window, because people are too aware of the power of the camera. To me, documentaries are now about manipulation. It's sad but true. You go in knowing exactly what you want and you come out with exactly what you want. That's just manipulation, and that I'm guilty of."

Phillips added "the parents complained that a lot of the boys were drunk or stoned in the film and got worried about how that would affect their futures -- and argued that they hadn't known what they were doing when they signed releases. Then there were allegations that we'd paid people to participate in the film which was not true, though it's done all the time, and if we had, I would proudly admit it. And they said it was staged, which it was not." Phillips later admitted that some of the participants were inebriated when they signed their release forms.

With the exception of a screening at the Alamo Drafthouse in September 2000, the film was never given an official release, though versions have occasionally circulated online.

=== Aftermath ===
When asked in 2000 if there was any fallout with his documentary subjects, Phillips said:

Sometimes I bump into one of the brothers here on the streets of New York -- some of them are now working on Wall Street. I think if I ran into them in a group and they were drunk, I might have a problem, but when I bump into one of them on the street, they'll say something like, 'Bones, dude, Blossom's looking for you, man, he wants to kill you.' [laughs] I also hear that the film circulates through frat houses at colleges all over the country, and people tell me that this college or that one makes the pledges watch the film and recite lines from it while they're hazing them. [laughs] I'm not saying that's a good thing at all, but apparently they don't see the damage in it. That's just part of life's great art.

Beta Chi, which at the time of filming was an unrecognized fraternity in Oneonta, was kicked off the Oneonta campus after reports of severe hazing emerged. In January 2018, the fraternity became recognized by SUNY Oneonta. Tau Kappa Epsilon was later recognized by the university in 2007 but subsequently had that recognition revoked.

== Critical reception ==
Upon the film's release, Variety reviewer Dennis Harvey called Phillips' direction "grotesquely funny — emphasis on the grotesque". Writing for Collider in 2023, Jonathan Norcross said that while the documentary's veracity and the level of the filmmakers' complicity remains unclear, its exploration of fraternity culture and the need to belong is disturbingly "thought-provoking". He added "there is something appealing about not knowing", and when documentaries engage in "[flirting] with fiction". Norcross concluded, "It’s easy to see in Frat House the darker, more cynical origins of Phillips' later work in the Hangover sequels and most especially, Joker. Old School might be a great comedy but it avoids all the deeper questions asked by Frat House. The combination of humor and horror in Frat House speaks to the entirety of Phillips’ body of work. Without Frat House, the director's oscillation between comedy and dark drama seems surprising. But with Frat House taken into consideration, Phillips’ perspective becomes much clearer."

Awards
| Preceded by Girls Like Us | Sundance Grand Jury Prize: Documentary; 1998 (tied with The Farm) | Succeeded by American Movie |
