= Seventeen (1983 film) =

- Directed by: Joel DeMott; Jeff Kreines
- Production company: The Middletown Film Project
- Distributed by: Icarus Films
- Release date: September 1983
- Country: United States
- Language: English

Seventeen is a 1983 American documentary film directed by Joel DeMott and Jeff Kreines. It is a film about coming of age in working class America. It was originally made as part of the 1982 PBS series Middletown produced by Peter Davis but was not aired.

It was awarded the Grand Jury Prize Documentary at the 1985 Sundance Film Festival.

== Critical reception ==
Vincent Canby of The New York Times called Seventeen, "one of the best and most scarifying reports on American life to be seen on a theater screen." In a later piece he added "It's Seventeen that haunts the memory. It has the characters and the language — as well as the vitality and honesty — that are the material of the best fiction. Ferociously provocative."

Michael Sragow, writing in The New Yorker, said: "Working with lightweight camera rigs they developed themselves, Jeff Kreines and Joel DeMott (who, despite the name, is female) approach the subjects of their documentary – working-class teenagers in Muncie, Indiana – man-to-man and woman-to-woman. The immediacy is refreshing, and shocking. As searing as it is rambunctious, this film brings out all the middle-class prejudices against the working class that American movies rarely confront."

Johnny Ray Huston, writing in SF360 and Indiewire, said "One thing is for sure: Seventeen is without a doubt one of the greatest movies, perhaps the greatest, about teenage life (not to mention American life) ever made."

Ira Glass, host of This American Life, said it was "the most amazing reporting on a high school that I had ever seen. It's called 'Seventeen' and it was directed by a couple, a woman named Joel DeMott and a man named Jeff Kreines. It was made in 1983, filmed at Southside High School in Muncie, Indiana. It's just this incredible document. It's so real and just one amazing moment after another."

== Accolades ==
Seventeen was awarded the Grand Jury Prize Documentary at the 1985 Sundance Film Festival, where the jurors were Barbara Kopple, D. A. Pennebaker, and Frederick Wiseman.

== See also ==
- Working class culture
- Coming of age
- 1985 in film

Awards
Preceded by Style Wars	Sundance Grand Jury Prize Documentary; 1985	Succeeded by Private Conversations
