= Parle (Chandgad) =

Village in Maharashtra

Coordinates: 15°51′N 74°12′E

- Village
- Interactive map of Parle
- Country: India
- State: Maharashtra
- District: Satara

Languages
  - Official: Marathi
- Time zone: UTC+5:30 (IST)
- Nearest city: Karad

Parle is a village in the city of Kolhapur located in the southwestern state of Maharashtra, India.

== History ==
There is a substantial amount of Chardo families in this area as they had migrated due to the persecution of the Portuguese in Goa.

== Language ==
Konkani is the main language spoken, as it is close to Goa. Many Goans have settled here when they migrated from Goa.
