= Grand Jury Prize Documentary =

Film award

This is the list of the winners of the Sundance Grand Jury Prize for documentary features since its first inception in 1982.

== Winners ==
=== 1980s ===
- 1982: Soldier Girls
- 1984: Style Wars
- 1985: Seventeen
- 1986: Private Conversations
- 1987: Sherman's March
- 1988: Beirut: The Last Home Movie
- 1989: For All Mankind

=== 1990s ===
- 1990: H-2 Worker / Water and Power
- 1991: American Dream / Paris Is Burning
- 1992: A Brief History of Time / Finding Christa
- 1993: Children of Fate: Life and Death in a Sicilian Family / Silverlake Life: The View from Here
- 1994: Freedom on My Mind
- 1995: Crumb
- 1996: Troublesome Creek: A Midwestern
- 1997: Girls Like Us
- 1998: The Farm: Angola, USA / Frat House
- 1999: American Movie

=== 2000s ===
- 2000: Long Night's Journey into Day
- 2001: Southern Comfort
- 2002: Daughter from Danang
- 2003: Capturing the Friedmans
- 2004: Dig!
- 2005: Why We Fight
- 2006: God Grew Tired of Us
- 2007: Manda Bala (Send a Bullet)
- 2008: Trouble the Water
- 2009: We Live in Public

=== 2010s ===
- 2010: Restrepo
- 2011: How to Die in Oregon
- 2012: The House I Live In
- 2013: Blood Brother
- 2014: Rich Hill
- 2015: The Wolfpack
- 2016: Weiner
- 2017: Dina
- 2018: The Price of Free
- 2019: One Child Nation

=== 2020s ===
- 2020: Boys State
- 2021: Summer of Soul
- 2022: The Exiles
- 2023: Going to Mars: The Nikki Giovanni Project
- 2024: Porcelain War
- 2025: Seeds
- 2026: Nuisance Bear

== International winners ==
- 2005: Shape of the Moon
- 2006: In the Pit
- 2007: Enemies of Happiness
- 2008: Man on Wire
- 2009: Rough Aunties
- 2010: The Red Chapel
- 2011: Hell and Back Again
- 2012: The Law in These Parts
- 2013: A River Changes Course
- 2014: The Return to Homs
- 2015: The Russian Woodpecker
- 2016: Sonita
- 2017: Last Men in Aleppo
- 2018: Of Fathers and Sons
- 2019: Honeyland
- 2020: Epicentro
- 2021: Flee
- 2022: All That Breathes
- 2023: The Eternal Memory
- 2024: A New Kind of Wilderness
- 2025: Cutting Through Rocks
- 2026: To Hold a Mountain

== See also ==
- Palme d'Or
- Academy Award for Best Documentary Feature
