= Parly (surname) =

Parly is a surname. Notable people with the surname include:

- Florence Parly (born 1963), French politician
- Ticho Parly (1928–1993), Danish opera singer

== See also ==
- Pardy
