= Girls Like Us (film) =

- Directed by: Tina Di Feliciantonio; Jane C. Wagner
- Produced by: Tina Di Feliciantonio
- Distributed by: Women Make Movies
- Release date: January 1997 (Sundance)
- Running time: 60 mins
- Country: United States
- Language: English

Girls Like Us is a 1997 documentary film directed by Tina Di Feliciantonio and Jane C. Wagner. It follows the lives of four teenage girls of Philadelphia for four years. Girls Like Us was funded by the Independent Television Service (ITVS) with funding from the Corporation for Public Broadcasting.

== Critical reception ==
Godfrey Cheshire of Variety magazine wrote, "If few films offer such rich human material in such succinct, balanced, nonpolemical form, fewer still are timely enough to serve as ideal conversation pieces for young women facing similar situations. Wagner and Di Feliciantonio's doc could prove as useful as it is intelligent."

The film won the Sundance Film Festival Grand Prize for Documentary in 1997. It was later aired on the PBS series POV. In 1997, Girls Like Us also took home a News and Documentary Emmy Award for Outstanding Cultural Programming.

Awards
Preceded by Troublesome Creek: A Midwestern	Sundance Grand Jury Prize: Documentary; 1997	Succeeded by The Farm tied with Frat House
