= The Parlor =

- Also known as: We are Jeneric
- Origin: Altamont, NY (US)
- Genres: Indie Pop
- Years active: 1998-present
- Labels: B3nson Recording Company (US), Five Kill Records (US)
- Members: Jen O'Connor, Eric Krans
- Website: theparlormusic.com

The Parlor is an American indie pop duo composed of husband and wife Eric Krans and Jen O'Connor. They have been active since 1998, previously under the name We are Jeneric. They have released two albums in their current incarnation, most recently Wahzu Wahzu in 2015.

Their music covers a wide range of genres, drawing from folk, dance, electronic, and pop influences. Pitchfork described their 2015 single "The Surgeon's Knife" as a "rural rave".

== History ==
O'Connor and Krans began writing and performing together in 1998, when they met in the elevator of their college dorm. They "didn't really think of [them]selves as a band", and thus never gave themselves a name. Friends began referring to them as "Jeneric", a combination of their first names, which later morphed into "We are Jeneric", after their website's url.

After spending time living abroad, the couple moved into O'Connor's family estate in Altamont, NY, converting it back into a working farm. They set up a recording space in the house's parlor, from which they derived their name. They formally changed their name to The Parlor in 2011 before the release of their album Our Day in the Sun.

Though their early work was rooted firmly in folk and bedroom pop, they adopted a number of electronic sounds in order to perform live as a duo, leading to an evolution of style. By the time they released their second album as The Parlor, 2015's Wahzu Wahzu, they had "developed an ever-evolving world of art-pop". The band's third album, Kiku, will be released in April 2018.

Krans and O'Connor have also been members of Sgt. Dunbar and the Hobo Banned, identified by NPR as a band to watch at South by Southwest 2009.

== Discography ==
=== Albums ===
as We are Jeneric

- Hansel & Gretel; Stories from the Stove (2007)
- In the Parlor With the Moon (2008)
- Animals are People Too (2009)

as The Parlor

- Our Day in the Sun (2011)
- Wahzu Wahzu (2015)
- Kiku (2018)

=== EPs ===
- The Ghost House EP (2014)
- Pocket Full of Sunshine (2017)
