= Parly =

- Commune
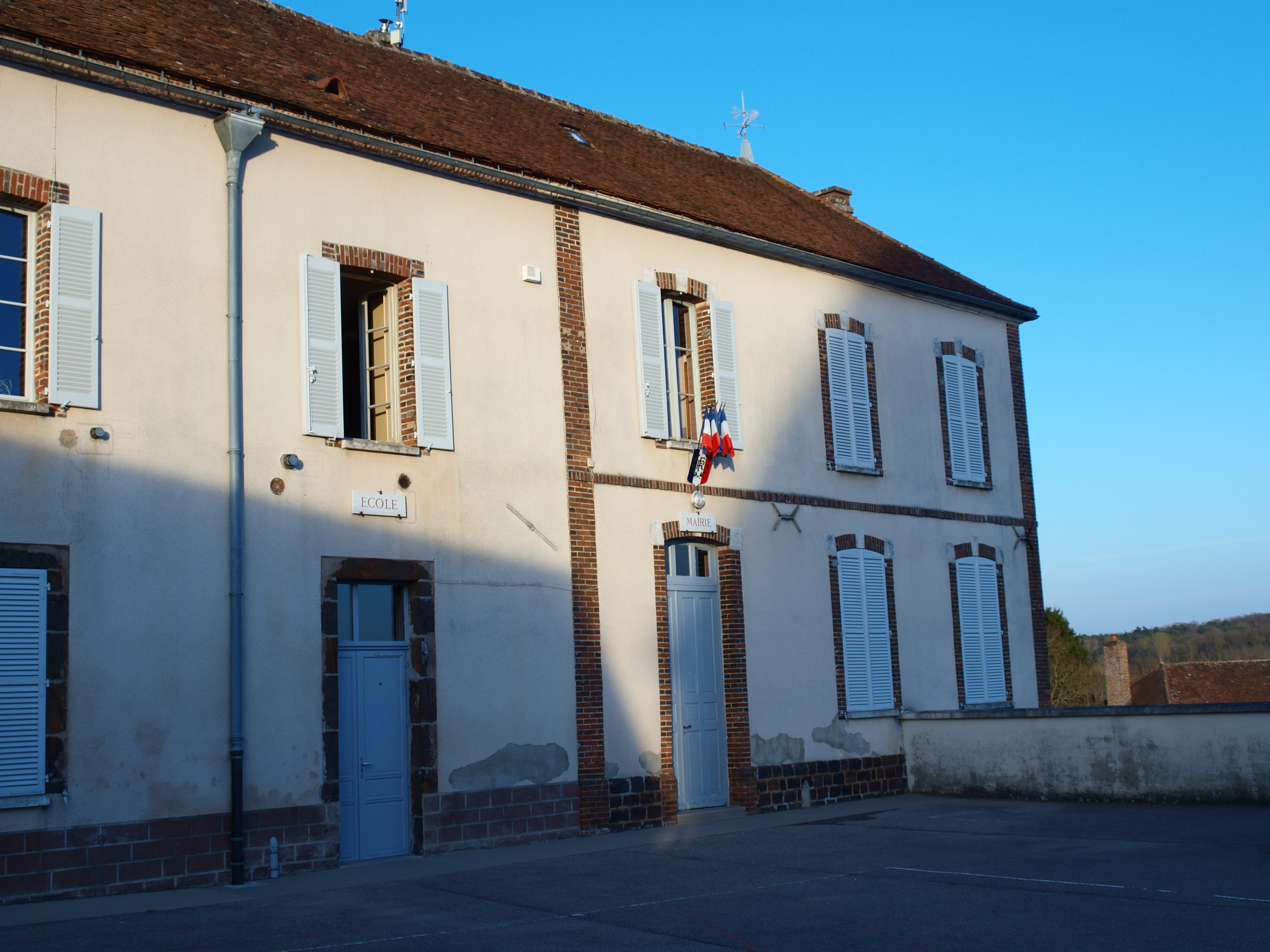
- The town hall in Parly

- Coat of arms
- Location of Parly
- Location within France Location within Bourgogne-Franche-Comté
- Coordinates: 47°45′55″N 3°20′54″E
- Country: France
- Region: Bourgogne-Franche-Comté
- Department: Yonne
- Arrondissement: Auxerre
- Canton: Cœur de Puisaye

Government
  - Mayor (2020–2026): Chantal Brousseau
- Area^{1}: 20.77 km^{2} (8.02 sq mi)
- Highest elevation: 320 m (1,050 ft)
- Lowest elevation: 157 m (515 ft)
- Population (2023): 817
  - Density: 39.3/km^{2} (102/sq mi)
- Time zone: UTC+01:00 (CET)
  - Summer (DST): UTC+02:00 (CEST)
- INSEE/Postal code: 89286 /89240
- ^{1} French Land Register data, which excludes lakes, ponds, glaciers > 1 km^{2} (0.386 sq mi or 247 acres) and river estuaries.

Parly (French pronunciation: [paʁli]) is a commune in the Yonne department in Bourgogne-Franche-Comté in north-central France.

== See also ==
- Communes of the Yonne department
