= Oksana Cherkashyna =

Ukrainian actress (born 1988)

- Оксана Черкашина
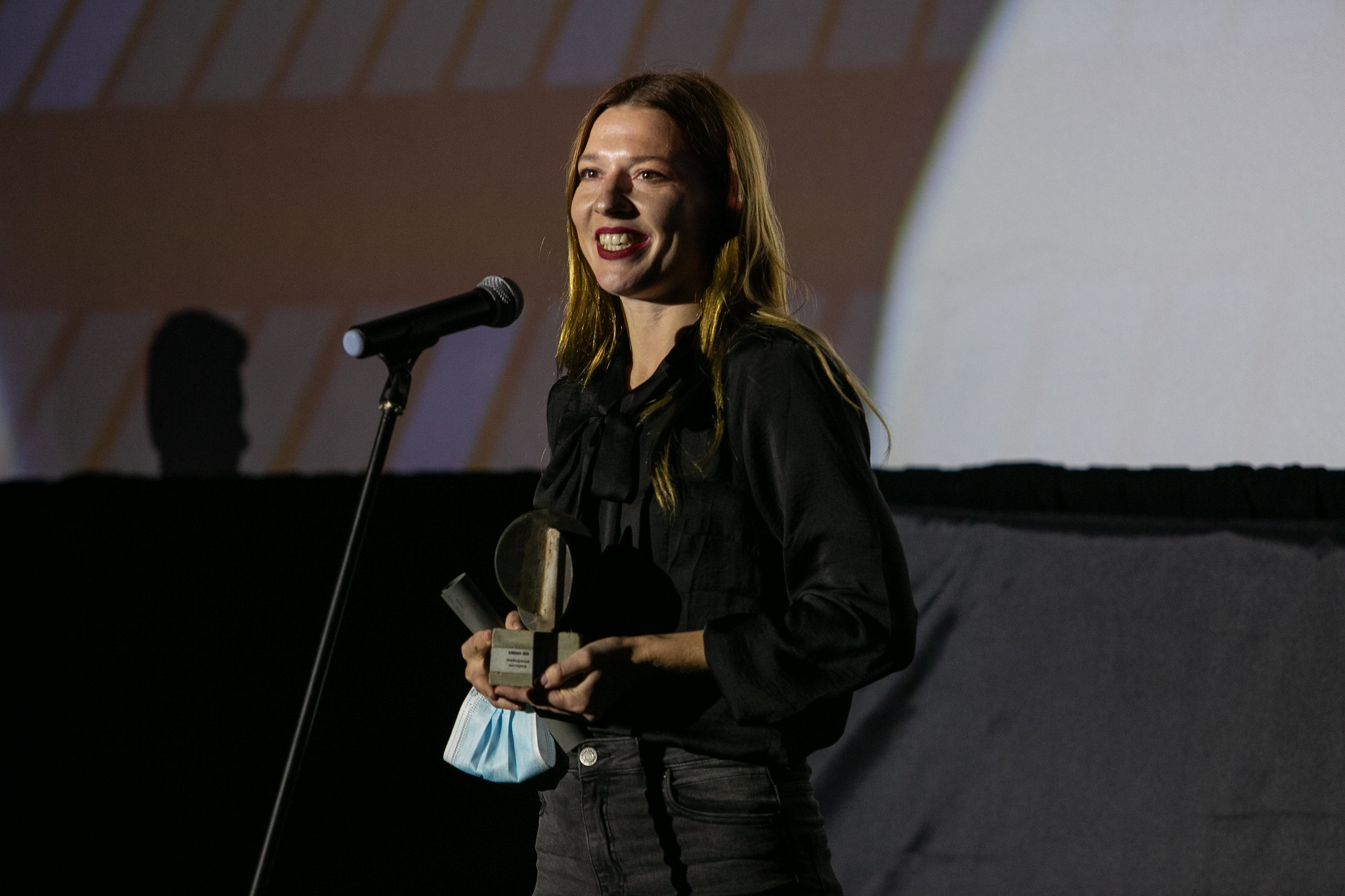
- Cherkashyna in 2020
- Born: Oksana Leonidivna Cherkashyna; 7 May 1988 (age 38); Kharkiv, Ukrainian SSR, Soviet Union (now Ukraine)
- Education: Kyiv National I. K. Karpenko-Kary Theatre, Cinema and Television University (MA)
- Occupation: Actress
- Years active: 2015–present
- Notable work: Filmography
- Awards: see here

Oksana Leonidivna Cherkashyna (Note: Ukrainian: Оксана Леонідівна Черкашина) (born 7 May 1988) is a Ukrainian theater and film actress. She has won several important honors in addition to being acknowledged for her exceptional performances on stage and cinema.

== Early life and education ==
Born on 7 May 1988, in the Ukrainian city of Kharkiv, Cherkashyna showed an early interest in the arts, particularly theater. She enrolled at the Kyiv National I. K. Karpenko-Kary Theatre, Cinema and Television University in 2005, and she earned a Master of Arts degree from the institution in 2009. She has been a trainer, director, and professor at the "Tisto School of Acting" since 2014.

== Career ==
Joanna Wichowska invited Cherkashyna to participate in the Polish-Ukrainian project "мапи страху/мапи ідентичності" in 2016. Following that, which Cherkashyna considered to be a turning point in her career, she participated in a number of autonomous initiatives for several years in collaboration with the British Council, the Goethe-Institut in Ukraine, and the Polish Theater Institute in Warsaw. Notable performances like "ДПЮ," "Ресторан Україна," "Мій дід копав, мій батько копав, а я не буду" are among them.

Cherkashyna started her acting career in the Kyiv theater on the left bank of the Dnieper after receiving her degree from university. She assumed a variety of roles in a variety of plays and soon established herself as the troupe's star actress. She was honored with two of the most important prizes in Polish theater in 2019: the Main Acting Award of the All-Polish Contemporary Art Competition and the second prize for Best Actress at the Divine Comedy Festival in Kraków. She was invited to the theater for 2018 and 2019, for the drama "Левів не віддамо."

Cherkashyna made her on-screen debut in Vladislav Vdovchenko's "Валентинів день", where she had a major part, in 2015. She won the Kyiv International Film Festival's Best Actress prize for this performance. She has since acted in several other movies, such as Klondike by Maryna Er Gorbach (for which she won the same prize in 2022) and Bad Roads by Natalka Vorozhbyt (for which she won the "Kinokol" award in 2020).

After watching Klondike at the Sundance and Berlin film festivals, Cherkashyna hoped that an invasion of Ukraine would not occur. When Russia did invade Ukraine on 24 February 2022 her perspective on politics, the world, and art were all altered. She no longer has faith in politics, the European Union, the European Community and the global society, as they all reacted with essentially no response. As a means of protesting the rapidly increasing levels of violence in the globe, she saw Klondike as a film "dedicated to all women" and emphasized the significance of presenting a "female perspective" on the conflict.

Klondike, Ukraine's submission for the Academy Award for Best International Feature Film 2023, stars Cherkashyna. For her role, she just took home the Fipresci Best Actress award from the Palm Springs film festival. Her next project, the Netflix television series Absolute Beginners, premiered in Poland in 2023.

== Personal life ==
Cherkashyna is fluent in Ukrainian, English, Polish, and Russian, with a basic understanding of French and German.

== Filmography ==
Year	Title	Role	Notes
2015	Devachan	A girl	
2015	Bring Us Your Women	Oxana Cherkashina	segment of "Mary Magdalene"
2016	Марія Магдалена	Maria	
2020	Bad Roads	Combat medic	
2021	Синдром Гамлета	Oksana	
2021	Приборкання норовливої	Solomiya	
2022	Klondike	Irka	
2023	Polowanie na cmy	Mrs. Szymalska	episode 1
2023	Green Border	Ukrainian refugee	
2023	Absolute Beginners	Igor's mother	

== Awards and recognitions ==
In addition to receiving fame in her native Ukraine, Cherkashyna also became well-known abroad. Critics and spectators have praised her works, which she has frequently exhibited at international film festivals. She became one of the most well-known Ukrainian actors outside because to her skills and competence. On the Day of Ukrainian Cinema, President Volodymyr Zelenskyy signed a decree (№465/2021) naming Cherkashyna as a Merited Artist of Ukraine and bestowing state medals to notable cinema professionals.

Award	Year	Category	Nominated work	Result
Golden Dzyga	2021	Best Female Role	Bad Roads	Nominated
Golden Dzyga	2023	Best Female Role	Klondike	Won
Kinokolo	2020	Best Actress	Bad Roads	Won
Kinokolo	2022	Best Actress	Klondike	Won
Southeast European Film Festival	2022	Outstanding Acting Achievements	Klondike	Won
