= 2022 Sundance Film Festival =

Edition of film festival

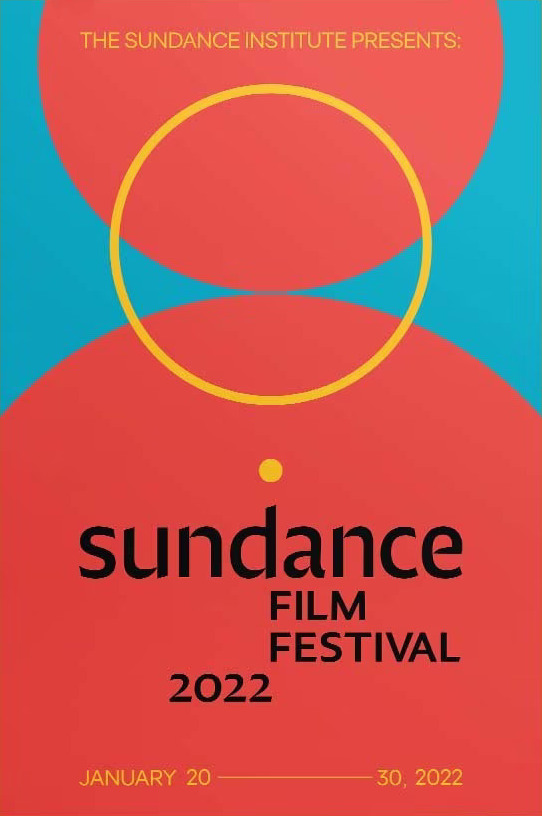
- Festival poster
- Location: Park City, Utah
- Founded: 1978
- Hosted by: Sundance Institute
- Festival date: January 20 to 30, 2022
- Language: English
- Website: Sundance
- 2023 Sundance Film Festival 2021 Sundance Film Festival

The 2022 Sundance Film Festival took place from January 20 to 30, 2022. Due to COVID-19 pandemic protocol, it was initially intended to be an in-person/virtual hybrid festival, but on January 5, 2022, it was announced that the in-person components would be scrapped in favor of a wholly virtual festival due to the SARS-CoV-2 Omicron variant. The first lineup of competition films was announced on December 9, 2021.

== Films ==
=== U.S. Dramatic Competition ===
- Alice, written and directed by Krystin Ver Linden
- Breaking (premiered as 892), directed and co-written by Abi Damaris Corbin
- Cha Cha Real Smooth, written, produced and directed by Cooper Raiff
- Dual, written, produced and directed by Riley Stearns
- Emergency, directed by Carey Williams
- I'll Be Your Mirror (premiered as blood), directed by Bradley Rust Gray
- Master, written and directed by Mariama Diallo
- Nanny, written and directed by Nikyatu Jusu
- Palm Trees and Power Lines, directed and co-written by Jamie Dack
- Watcher, written and directed by Chloe Okuno

=== U.S. Documentary Competition ===
- Aftershock, produced and directed by Paula Eiselt and Tonya Lewis Lee
- Descendant, directed by Margaret Brown
- The Exiles, directed by Ben Klein and Violet Columbus
- Fire of Love, directed, co-written and co-produced by Sara Dosa
- Free Chol Soo Lee, directed by Julie Ha and Eugene Yi
- I Didn't See You There, directed by Reid Davenport
- The Janes, directed by Tia Lessin and Emma Pildes
- Jihad Rehab, directed by Meg Smaker
- Navalny, directed by Daniel Roher
- TikTok, Boom., directed by Shalini Kantayya

=== Premieres ===
- 2nd Chance, directed by Ramin Bahrani
- Am I OK?, directed by Stephanie Allynne and Tig Notaro
- Brainwashed: Sex-Camera-Power, directed by Nina Menkes
- Call Jane, directed by Phyllis Nagy
- Downfall: The Case Against Boeing, directed and co-produced by Rory Kennedy
- Emily the Criminal, written and directed by John Patton Ford
- God's Country, directed and co-written by Julian Higgins
- Good Luck to You, Leo Grande, directed by Sophie Hyde
- Honk for Jesus. Save Your Soul., written, directed and co-produced by Adamma Ebo
- jeen-yuhs: A Kanye Trilogy, directed by Clarence "Coodie" Simmons and Chike Ozah
- La Guerra Civil, produced and directed by Eva Longoria Bastón
- Living, directed by Oliver Hermanus
- Lucy and Desi, directed and co-produced by Amy Poehler
- My Old School, directed by Jono McLeod
- The Princess, directed by Ed Perkins
- Resurrection, written and directed by Andrew Semans
- Sharp Stick, written, directed and co-produced by Lena Dunham
- To the End, directed by Rachel Lears
- We Need to Talk About Cosby, directed by W. Kamau Bell
- When You Finish Saving the World, written and directed by Jesse Eisenberg

=== World Cinema Dramatic Competition ===
- Brian and Charles, directed by Jim Archer
- The Cow Who Sang a Song Into The Future, directed by Francisca Alegría
- Dos Estaciones, directed by Juan Pablo González
- Gentle, directed by Anna Eszter Nemes and László Csuja
- Girl Picture, directed by Alli Haapasalo
- Klondike, written, directed and edited by Maryna Er Gorbach
- Leonor Will Never Die, written and directed by Martika Ramirez Escobar
- Mars One, directed by Gabriel Martins
- Utama, directed by Alejandro Loayza Grisi
- You Won't Be Alone, written and directed by Goran Stolevski

=== World Cinema Documentary Competition ===
- All That Breathes, directed by Shaunak Sen
- Calendar Girls, directed by Maria Loohufvud and Love Martinsen
- A House Made of Splinters, directed by Simon Lereng Wilmont
- Midwives, directed by Snow Hnin Ei Hlaing
- The Mission, directed by Tania Anderson
- Nothing Compares, directed by Kathryn Ferguson
- Sirens, directed by Rita Baghdadi
- Tantura, directed by Alon Schwarz
- The Territory, directed and co-produced by Alex Pritz
- We Met in Virtual Reality, directed by Joe Hunting

=== Midnight ===
- Babysitter, directed by Monia Chokri
- Fresh, directed by Mimi Cave
- Hatching, directed by Hanna Bergholm
- Meet Me in the Bathroom, directed by Dylan Southern and Will Lovelace
- Piggy, written and directed by Carlota Pereda
- Speak No Evil, directed and co-written by Christian Tafdrup

=== Next ===
- The Cathedral, written, directed and edited by Ricky D'Ambrose
- Every Day in Kaimukī by Alika Tengan
- Framing Agnes, directed by Chase Joynt
- A Love Song, written, directed, produced and co-edited by Max Walker-Silverman
- Mija, directed by Isabel Castro
- Riotsville, U.S.A., directed by Sierra Pettengill
- Something in the Dirt, directed by Justin Benson and Aaron Moorhead

=== Spotlight ===
- After Yang, written, directed and edited by Kogonada
- Happening, directed and co-written by Audrey Diwan
- Neptune Frost, directed by Saul Williams
- Three Minutes: A Lengthening, directed by Bianca Stigter
- The Worst Person in the World, directed by Joachim Trier

== Awards ==
The following awards were given out:

=== Grand Jury Prizes ===
- U.S. Dramatic Competition – Nanny (Nikyatu Jusu)
- U.S. Documentary Competition – The Exiles (Ben Klein and Violet Columbus)
- World Cinema Dramatic Competition – Utama (Alejandro Loayza Grisi)
- World Cinema Documentary Competition – All That Breathes (Shaunak Sen)

=== Audience Awards ===
- Festival Favorite – Navalny (Daniel Roher)
- U.S. Dramatic Competition – Cha Cha Real Smooth (Cooper Raiff)
- U.S. Documentary Competition – Navalny (Daniel Roher)
- World Cinema Dramatic Competition – Girl Picture (Alli Haapasalo)
- World Cinema Documentary Competition – The Territory (Alex Pritz)
- NEXT – Framing Agnes (Chase Joynt)

=== Directing, Screenwriting and Editing ===
- U.S. Dramatic Competition – Jamie Dack for Palm Trees and Power Lines
- U.S. Documentary Competition – Reid Davenport for I Didn't See You There
- World Cinema Dramatic Competition – Maryna Er Gorbach for Klondike
- World Cinema Documentary Competition – Simon Lereng Wilmont for A House Made of Splinters
- Waldo Salt Screenwriting Award – K.D. Dávila for Emergency
- Jonathan Oppenheim Editing Award: U.S. Documentary – Erin Casper and Jocelyne Chaput for Fire of Love
- NEXT Innovator Prize – Chase Joynt for Framing Agnes

=== Special Jury Prizes ===
- U.S. Dramatic Special Jury Award: Ensemble Cast – The cast of 892
- U.S. Dramatic Special Jury Award: Uncompromising Artistic Vision – Bradley Rust Gray for blood
- U.S. Documentary Special Jury Award: Creative Vision – Margaret Brown for Descendant
- U.S. Documentary Special Jury Award: Impact for Change – Paula Eiselt and Tonya Lewis Lee for Aftershock
- World Cinema Dramatic Special Jury Award: Acting – Teresa Sánchez for Dos Estaciones
- World Cinema Dramatic Special Jury Award: Innovative Spirit – Martika Ramirez Escobar for Leonor Will Never Die
- World Cinema Documentary Special Jury Award: Excellence in Verité Filmmaking – Snow Hnin Ei Hlaing for Midwives
- World Cinema Documentary Special Jury Award: Documentary Craft – Alex Pritz for The Territory

=== Short Film Awards ===
- Short Film Grand Jury Prize – The Headhunter's Daughter
- Short Film Jury Award: U.S. Fiction – If I Go Will They Miss Me
- Short Film Jury Award: International Fiction – Warsha
- Short Film Jury Award: Nonfiction – Displaced
- Short Film Jury Award: Animation – Night Bus
- Short Film Special Jury Award for Ensemble Cast – A Wild Patience Has Taken Me Here
- Short Film Special Jury Award for Screenwriting – Stranger Than Rotterdam with Sara Driver

=== Special Prizes ===
- Alfred P. Sloan Feature Film Prize – After Yang
- Sundance Institute/Amazon Studios Producers Award for Nonfiction – Su Kim for Free Chol Soo Lee
- Sundance Institute/Amazon Studios Producers Award for Fiction – Amanda Marshall for God's Country
- Sundance Institute/Adobe Mentorship Award for Editing Nonfiction – Toby Shimin
- Sundance Institute/Adobe Mentorship Award for Editing Fiction – Dody Dorn
- Sundance Institute/NHK Award – Hasan Hadi for The President's Cake

== Acquisitions ==
- 2nd Chance: Showtime Documentary Films (North American distribution)
- A Love Song: Stage 6 Films and Bleecker Street (worldwide distribution); Cinetic Media (North American sales); Films Boutique (International sales)
- Aftershock: Onyx Collective and ABC News
- Alice: Vertical Entertainment and Roadside Attractions (North American distribution)
- Am I OK?: Warner Bros. Pictures and HBO Max
- Breaking: Bleecker Street (US distribution)
- Brian And Charles: Focus Features (worldwide rights; US distribution); Universal Pictures (International distribution)
- Calendar Girls: Juno Films (North American distribution)
- Call Jane: Roadside Attractions (US distribution)
- Cha Cha Real Smooth: Apple TV+
- Descendant: Netflix and Higher Ground Productions
- Dual: RLJE Films (US distribution)
- Emily the Criminal: Vertical Entertainment and Roadside Attractions (US distribution); Universal Pictures (International distribution)
- Fire of Love: National Geographic Documentary Films
- Free Chol Soo Lee: MUBI (select territories including North America)
- Fresh: Searchlight Pictures and Hulu
- God's Country: IFC Films (North American distribution)
- Good Luck To You, Leo Grande: Searchlight Pictures and Hulu (US distribution)
- Honk for Jesus. Save Your Soul: Focus Features, Peacock and Monkeypaw Productions
- Leonor Will Never Die: Music Box Films (North American distribution)
- Living: Sony Pictures Classics (select territories including North America)
- Mars One: Magnolia Pictures (international sales)
- My Old School: Magnolia Pictures (North American distribution)
- Nanny: Amazon Studios and Blumhouse Productions
- Navalny: Warner Bros. Pictures (North American theatrical distribution)
- Neptune Frost: Kino Lorber
- Nothing Compares: Showtime Documentary Films
- Piggy: Magnet Releasing (US distribution); Filmax (distribution in Spain)
- Resurrection: IFC Films and Shudder (North American distribution)
- Sharp Stick: Utopia (US distribution)
- Speak No Evil: Shudder (select territories including North America)
- The Cathedral: MUBI (North American distribution)
- The Territory: National Geographic Documentary Films
- Utama: Kino Lorber (US distribution)
- Watcher: IFC Midnight and Shudder (North American distribution); Focus Features and Universal Pictures (International distribution)
