= Brooke Sebold =

Nonbinary filmmaker

- Born: U.S.
- Occupations: Filmmaker; creator; editor
- Years active: 2006–present

Brooke Sebold is an American nonbinary filmmaker. They are known most for their work as co-director of the documentary film Red Without Blue (2006), and as co-producer and editor of the documentary feature Framing Agnes (2022).

== Career ==
Sebold grew up in Tucson, Arizona. They hold a BA from Brown University, and an MFA from Columbia University.

=== Filmmaking ===
Sebold has directed a number of short films including Brotherhood (2008), The Last Cigarette (2009), After The Snow (2011), and Grandma Bruce (2023). In 2006, Sebold co-directed their first feature documentary Red Without Blue, which won the audience award at the Slamdance Film Festival and the Jury Award at the Frameline Film Festival. In 2023, Sebold joined forces with Second Peninsula on the series I Changed My Mind, which Sebold created and hosts. I Changed My Mind received the Intellectual Humility grant from The Greater Good Science Center at the University of California, Berkeley, and was named a Silver Award Winner at the Anthem Awards honoring mission driven work that has a social impact.

=== Editing ===
Sebold has worked in post-production for over 20 years, beginning their career as an assistant editor at Citizen Film (Let’s Get Real). Much of Sebold’s work focuses on issues of gender and identity, including feature films Alaska Is A Drag, Someone Else, and Framing Agnes. Brooke also edits the Emmy nominated series Brief But Spectacular, which airs weekly on PBS NewsHour.

== Selected filmography ==
Year	Title	Contribution	Note
2007	Red Without Blue	Co-director, writer, editor and producer	Documentary
2008	Brotherhood	Director and editor	Short film
2011	After the Snow	Director and editor	Short film
2015	Someone Else	Editor	Feature film
2015	Brief But Spectacular	Editor	TV series
2017	Alaska Is a Drag	Editor	Feature film
2022	Framing Agnes	Editor and co-producer	Documentary
2024	Grandma Bruce	Director and writer	Short film

== Awards and nominations ==
Year	Result	Award	Category	Work	Ref.
2007	Won	Rhode Island International Film Festival	Alternative Spirit	Red Without Blue	
2007	Won	Frameline Film Festival	Jury Award	Red Without Blue	
2007	Won	Slamdance Film Festival	Audience Award	Red Without Blue	
2007	Won	Dublin Lesbian and Gay Film Festival	Best Documentary	Red Without Blue	
2007	Won	Inside Out Film and Video Festival	Best Documentary	Red Without Blue	
2007	Won	Tampa International Gay and Lesbian Film Festival	Best Documentary	Red Without Blue	
2009	Nominated	Palm Springs International Festival of Short Films	Student Award	Brotherhood	
2011	Won	Florida Film Festival	Special Jury Award	After the Snow	
2023	Silver	Anthem Awards	Awareness Categories (For Profit)	I Changed My Mind	
