= Hanna Bergholm =

Finnish film director

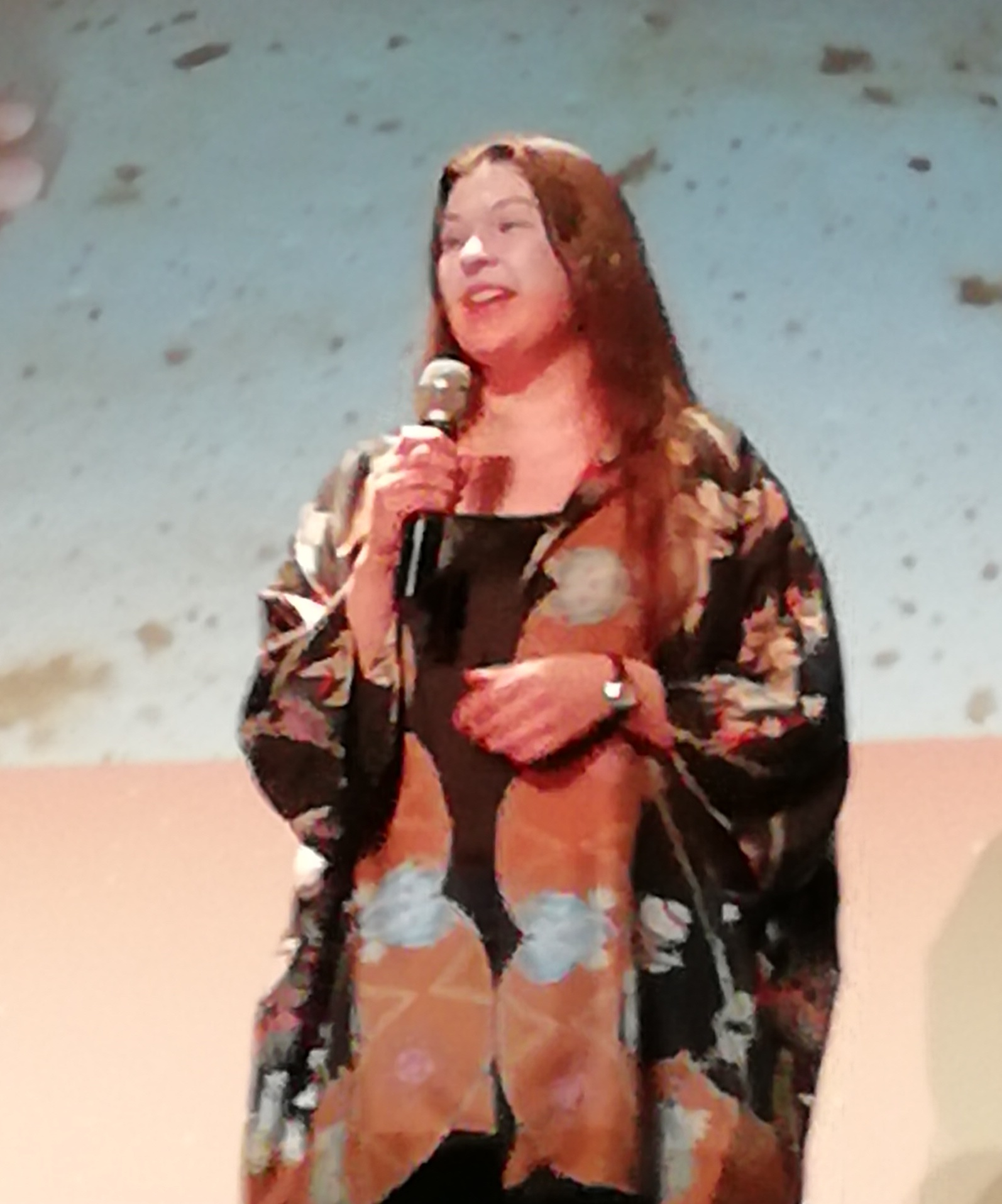
- Born: Helsinki, Finland
- Occupations: Film director; Scriptwriter

Hanna Bergholm is a Finnish film director and screenwriter best known for her debut feature film Hatching, which premiered at the Sundance Film Festival in the Midnight section.

== Early life and education ==
Bergholm grew up in a family involved in filmmaking and developed an interest in cinema at an early age. She later graduated from the Film Department of the University of Art and Design Helsinki.

== Career ==
Prior to directing her first feature film, Bergholm directed several short films, including Varjot and Gorilla, which received international recognition. She also directed the television drama series A Reetta ja Ronja. Her later short horror film Puppet Master screened at multiple international film festivals, including the Fantasia Film Festival, Fantastic Fest, and the Museum of Modern Art in New York.

Hanna Bergholm in 2026

In 2022, Bergholm made her feature film debut with the psychological horror film Hatching, directed by Bergholm and written by Ilja Rautsi. The film centres on a young girl whose suppressed emotions manifest through a creature hatched from a mysterious egg, exploring themes of perfectionism, family dynamics, and maternal pressure. The project originated from a story concept by Rautsi, which Bergholm developed further, including changing the protagonist from a boy to a girl. Bergholm has stated that this decision was motivated by a desire to focus on underrepresented perspectives of girls and mothers in cinema.

Hatching premiered internationally at the Sundance Film Festival. Prior to its Finnish theatrical release in March 2022, the film secured distribution agreements in more than 40 countries, including the United States.

In 2026, Bergholm directed her second feature film, Nightborn, a dark fable centred on motherhood. The film follows a woman who moves with her husband to her childhood home in a remote Finnish forest, where she begins to suspect that something is wrong with her newborn child. Nightborn stars Seidi Haarla and Rupert Grint, and premiered at the 76th Berlin International Film Festival.
