= Klondike (2022 film) =

- Poster
- Ukrainian: Клондайк
- Directed by: Maryna Er Gorbach
- Written by: Maryna Er Gorbach
- Produced by: Maryna Er Gorbach; Sviatoslav Bulakovskyi; Mehmet Bahadir Er
- Starring: Oksana Cherkashyna; Sergey Shadrin; Oleg Scherbina; Oleg Shevchuk; Artur Aramyan; Evgenij Efremov
- Cinematography: Sviatoslav Bulakovskyi
- Edited by: Maryna Er Gorbach
- Music by: Zviad Mgebrishvili
- Production companies: Kedr Film; Protim Video Production; TRT
- Release date: January 21, 2022 (Sundance)
- Running time: 100 minutes
- Countries: Ukraine; Turkey
- Languages: Ukrainian; Russian; Chechen; Dutch
- Budget: ₴25,960,000

Klondike (Ukrainian: «Клондайк», romanized: Klondaik) is a 2022 Ukrainian drama film written, directed, and edited by Maryna Er Gorbach. The film stars Oksana Cherkashyna as a pregnant woman living near the Ukrainian-Russian border during the Russo-Ukrainian War and the shooting of Malaysia Airlines Flight 17. Klondike premiered at the Sundance Film Festival on January 21, 2022, where it won the World Cinema Dramatic Competition for directing. At the Berlin International Film Festival, it won the second place in Panorama Audience Award category. The film was selected as the Ukrainian entry for the Best International Feature Film at the 95th Academy Awards.

== Plot ==
The film focuses on the story of a local Ukrainian family trapped at the epicenter of the crash of MH17. The actions unfold on July 17, 2014, in the village of Grabove, Donetsk region, near the Russian border. The protagonists Irina and Anatoly are expecting their first child, as the war brutally invades their lives, along with the wreckage of a downed Boeing. The woman refuses to evacuate, even when armed groups occupy the village.

== Cast ==
- Oksana Cherkashyna as Irka
- Serhiy Shadrin as Tolik
- Oleg Shcherbina as Yurik, Irka's younger brother

== Film crew ==
- Director — Maryna Er Gorbach
- Screenwriter — Maryna Er Gorbach
- Cinematographer — Sviatoslav Bulakovsky
- Art Directors — Maria Denisenko, Vitaly Sudarkov, Andrew Grechishkin
- Composer — Zviad Mgebrishvili
- Sound director — Sergeant Kurpiel
- Costume designer — Victoria Filipova
- Makeup artist — Ksenia Galchenko
- Producers — Maryna Er Gorbach, Svyatoslav Bulakovsky, Mehmet Bahadir Er

== Film production ==
The film project won the 11th State Cinema Competition held by Ukrainian State Film Agency. Additionally, in May 2021, the Ministry of Culture and Tourism of Turkey supported film production. The budget accounted for ₴25.9 million. The casting was guided by Tanya Simon. Bosnian sound director Serjan Kurpiel and Georgian composer Zviad Mgebrishvili were also involved in the project. Under the terms of cooperation, 90% of post-production took place in Turkey.

== Reception ==
=== Critical response ===
As of November 2024 Klondike has an approval rating of 98% on review aggregator website Rotten Tomatoes, based on 40 reviews. The website's critics consensus states: "Klondike offers a bleak portrait of a war-torn Ukrainian village with the mordant wit of someone who understands that for civilians, the mundanities of life must go on". Metacritic assigned the film a weighted average score of 83 out of 100, based on 10 critics' reviews, indicating "generally favourable reviews".

=== Awards and nominations ===
| Year | Award | Category | Recipient | Result | Ref. |
|---|---|---|---|---|---|
| 2022 | Sundance Film Festival | Directing Award World Cinema Dramatic Competition | Maryna Er Gorbach | Won | |
| 2022 | Berlin International Film Festival | Prize of the Ecumenical Jury (Panorama Section) | Klondike | Won | |
| 2022 | International Istanbul Film Festival | National Competition-Golden Tulip Best Film | Klondike | Won | |

== See also ==
- List of submissions to the 95th Academy Awards for Best International Feature Film
- List of Ukrainian submissions for the Academy Award for Best International Feature Film
