= Nightborn =

2026 film by Hanna Bergholm

- Film poster
- Finnish: Yön lapsi
- Directed by: Hanna Bergholm
- Written by: Hanna Bergholm; Ilja Rautsi
- Produced by: Daniel Kuitunen; Noëmie Devide
- Starring: Seidi Haarla; Rupert Grint; Pamela Tola; Pirkko Saisio; Rebecca Lacey; John Thomson
- Cinematography: Pietari Peltola
- Edited by: Jussi Rautaniemi
- Music by: Eicca Toppinen
- Production companies: Elokuvayhtiö Komeetta; Getaway Films; Filmai
- Distributed by: Shudder (North America, Australia and New Zealand)
- Release dates: 14 February 2026 (Berlinale); 31 July 2026 (Shudder); 6 November 2026 (Finland)
- Running time: 92 minutes
- Countries: Finland; Lithuania; France; United Kingdom
- Languages: English; Finnish

Nightborn (Finnish: Yön lapsi) is a 2026 fantasy horror film directed by Hanna Bergholm, in her English language debut feature film, co-written by Bergholm and Ilja Rautsi. It stars Seidi Haarla and Rupert Grint as new parents living in the Finnish forest.

The film had its world premiere at the main competition of the 76th Berlin International Film Festival on 14 February 2026, where it was nominated for the Golden Bear.

== Plot ==
Saga and Jon visit a derelict house in the Finnish forest that belonged to Saga's late grandmother. They find a tree growing through the floorboards of the bedroom Saga shared with her sister, Taru. Jon proposes to renovate the house into a family home where they can raise children together. They go into the surrounding forest, where Saga embraces a tree with a trunk resembling a pregnant belly, and have sex.

Saga has a difficult childbirth, severely tearing her birth canal, during which the baby boy is unsettlingly silent. On the maternity ward, the infant cries only when the curtains are opened. Breastfeeding the baby leaves Saga's breast bloodied and swollen, and his body is covered with thick black hair.

At the now-renovated house, Saga's childhood bedroom has been transformed into a nursery. When Saga's mother and Taru visit, Saga expresses concern that something is wrong with the baby, referring to him only as "it". Her mother dismisses these fears, even after the infant forcefully tears an earring from her earlobe.

At a naming ceremony in the garden, guests are unsettled by the baby’s appearance and visceral crying. A gust of wind from the forest blows a cover over his stroller, shielding him from the sunlight. Saga announces that the baby will be named Kuura, upsetting Jon, who had expected to name him Christian after his father. Saga notices the sunlight has left deep burns in Kuura's skin.

Kuura begins to behave very unusually. One night, Saga falls asleep while trying to settle Kuura and awakens to find he has escaped his cot and is transfixed by the tree that has begun growing again through the nursery floorboards. The following morning, Jon discovers the floorboards torn up and Saga asleep among the tree's roots, cradling Kuura. When Saga accidentally cuts herself on broken glass, she finds Kuura sucking up her blood. At a baby clinic, a clinician dismisses Saga's concerns and tells her that Kuura is simply advanced for his age, referring her for counselling to help her bond with him. Saga begins secretly feeding Kuura blood instead of milk.

While helping Jon dismantle rusted cars in the garden, Taru recounts her grandmother's warning that the surrounding forest is dangerous and explains that she kept scrap metal around the property because "cold iron bursts them". When Jon's parents visit, his father - a vicar - blesses Kuura with holy water, which has no physical effect on him, but later, when Kuura grasps an unused, cold fire iron, his hand is badly burned.

Jon and Saga’s relationship becomes increasingly strained when he expresses concern that Saga is failing to socialise Kuura properly. When he discovers she did not pursue the clinician’s referral, he storms out of the house, leaving Saga alone with Kuura. Saga awakes to find Kuura has bitten her. She locks herself in the bathroom while Kuura tries to get in, and tells her mother on the phone she feels she needs to kill Kuura before he kills her, but she tells Saga that there is nothing out of the ordinary.

When Jon returns to the house, he suggests Saga is exhausted and needs time to herself. She makes an overnight trip to the city to visit friends, leaving Jon to care for Kuura, but when separated from her son develops a severe rash which disappears only when she rushes home to be with him.

Kuura becomes increasingly violent. During a visit from Taru and her daughter Anna, he bites off Anna's finger. Jon tries to feed Kuura baby food but he shoves the metal spoon away and throws the jar at Jon. Saga gives Kuura raw meat instead, which he eats, and Jon accuses Saga of turning Kuura into a monster. Jon attempts to leave the house with Kuura, leading to a violent struggle with Saga. During the confrontation, tree branches erupt through the nursery floor and windows, fatally impaling Jon through the chest. Saga and Kuura feed on Jon's blood and heart.

In the aftermath, Kuura runs into the garden, where a humanoid figure separates itself from one of the trees and approaches him with outstretched arms as Saga watches from the porch. Kuura giggles and turns back to Saga, smiling. Saga smiles back.

== Cast ==
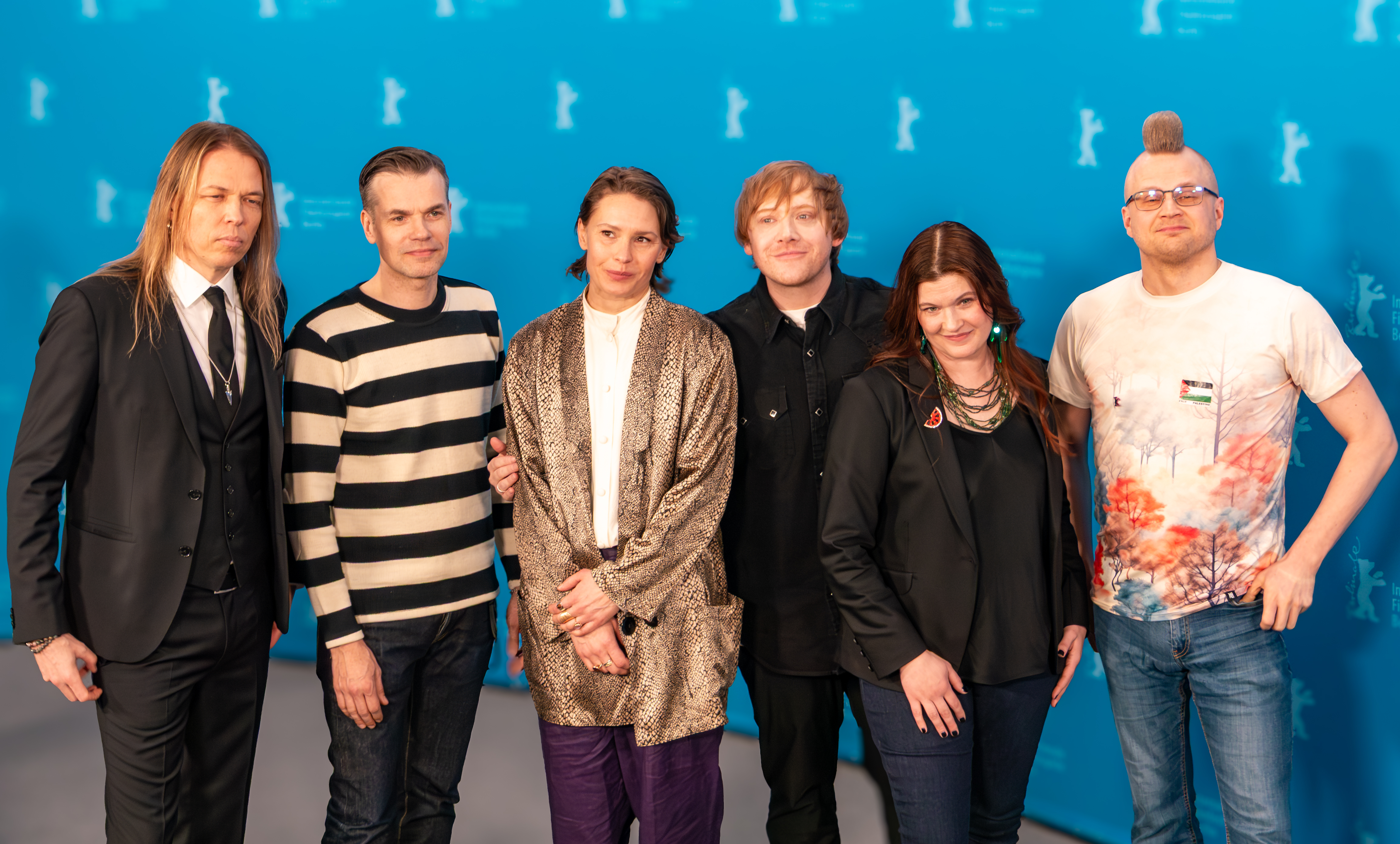
Cast and crew at the 76th Berlin International Film Festival

- Seidi Haarla as Saga, a Finnish woman
- Rupert Grint as Jon, Saga's English husband
- Pamela Tola as Taru, Saga's sister
- Pirkko Saisio as Saga's mother
- Rebecca Lacey as Jon's mother
- John Thomson as Christian, Jon's Father

== Production ==
The project received €475,000 production grant from Eurimages in November 2023. In January 2024, it received £210,000 from the British Film Institute as one of the recipients of its UK Global Screen Fund initiative. In April 2024, it received €950,000 production grant from the Finnish Film Foundation. It was awarded €75,000 production grant by the Lithuanian Film Centre in July 2024.

Principal photography took place in Lithuania for forty-five days and wrapped in December 2024.

== Release ==
Nightborn had its world premiere at the Main Competition section of the 76th Berlin International Film Festival in February 2026. In October 2024, Goodfellas and Anonymous Content acquired the film's international sales.

It was screened in the Kinoscope section of the 32nd Sarajevo Film Festival in August 2026.

The film was released on Shudder in the United States, Canada, Australia and New Zealand on 31 July 2026.

== Reception ==
On the review aggregator website Rotten Tomatoes, 75% of 55 critics' reviews are positive. The website's consensus reads: "Turning postpartum anxieties into a very real nightmare, this creepy and unsubtle horror movie gets its most lasting impact from Seidi Haarla's unnervingly raw star turn."

Damon Wise of Deadline Hollywood gave the film a positive review and wrote: Bergholm has a lot of fun with all these elements, and seasoned genre audiences—who are so very well versed in misdirection by now—should too. Zach Lewis of Slant Magazine rated the film a 2.5/4 rating and wrote a positive review saying that: Even if the film has few surprises in store for us, there’s something pleasingly unpretentious about how it leaves little room for subtext throughout.

Nikki Baughan of Screen International wrote a positive review of the film saying: Finnish director Hanna Bergholm’s audacious second feature is likely to be divisive, but those who connect with its themes and rhythms will find a great deal to enjoy. Jordan Mintzer of The Hollywood Reporter also wrote a positive review of the film he said that: Part of what makes Nightborn both stomach-churning and thought-provoking is how all the crazy stuff happening is just a slightly—okay, substantially—exaggerated version of the reality so many first-time parents face.

Same as Mintzer, Catherine Bray of Variety also gave a positive review to the film and she said that: Grint is a fine choice for the role of Jon, as his screen persona works well with the character's schlubby, well-meaning passivity.

However, Peter Bradshaw of The Guardian gave the film a 2/5 rating saying, "Some amusing moments, but a disappointment after the excellent Hatching".
