= Hoegen =

Hoegen is a surname. Notable people with the surname include:

- Egon Hoegen (1928–2018), German actor and off-camera voice artist
- Gustav Hoegen, Dutch animatronic designer/ creature FX artist
