= Reino Nordin =

Finnish actor and musician

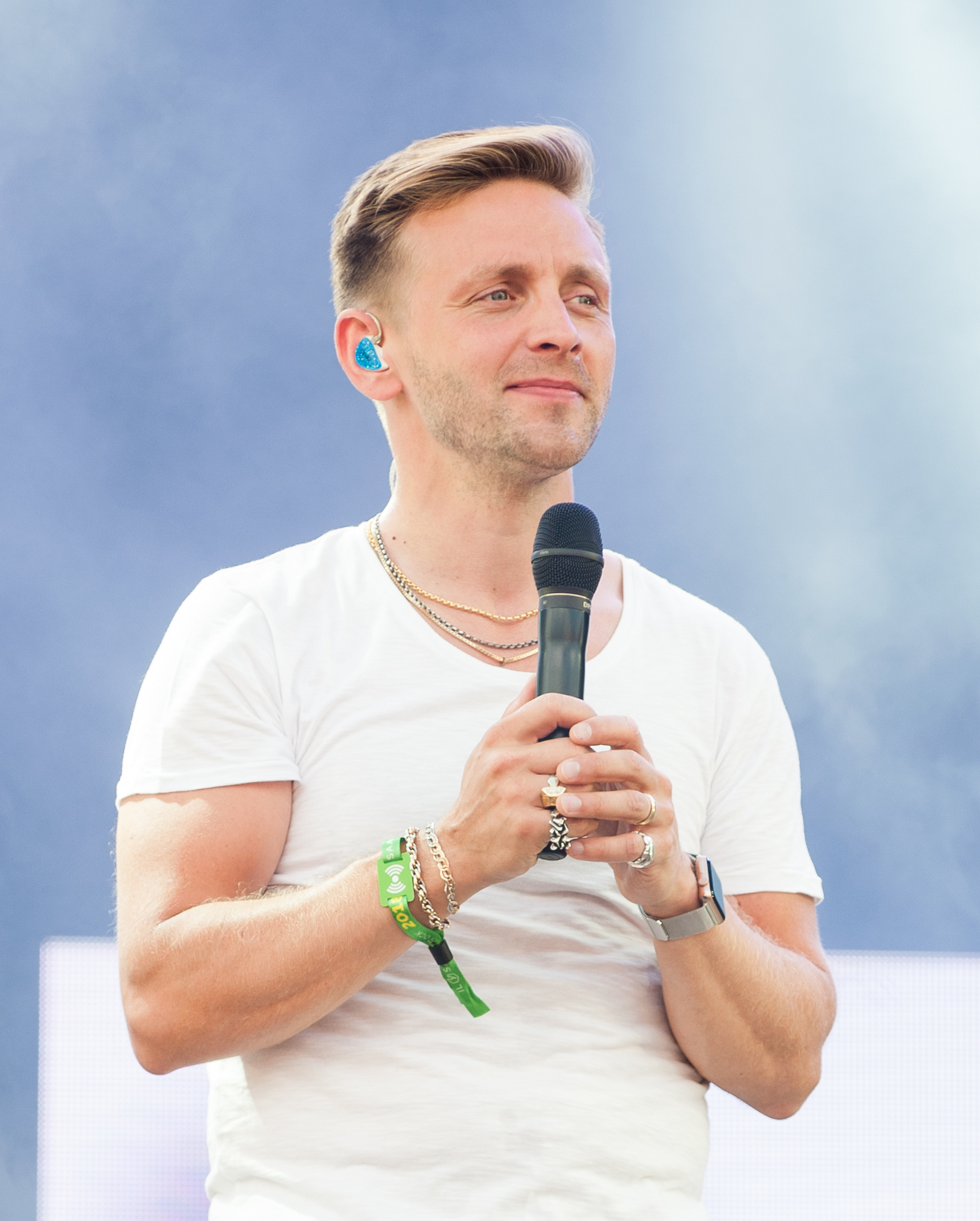
- Nordin at the Ilosaarirock festival in 2018
- Born: 25 May 1983 (age 43); Helsinki, Finland
- Occupations: Singer; musician; actor
- Years active: 1997–present
- Musical career
- Genres: Pop; R&B; reggae
- Instruments: Vocals, guitar
- Labels: WMG Finland; Monsp; PME

Reino Nordin (born 25 May 1983) is a Finnish actor and musician who is known for starring in films such as Young Gods, Ganes and Purge. Nordin has released four solo albums and two albums with his band Reino & The Rhinos. His sister is singer Siiri Nordin and his grandmother was Outi Heiskanen.

== Partial filmography ==
- Young Gods (2003)
- Game Over (2005)
- Ganes (2007)
- Tears of April (2008)
- Purge (2012)
- Rendel (2017)
- Hatching (2021)
- My Name Is Dingo (2024)

== Partial discography ==
Reino & The Rhinos

- Tähän tyyliin (2008)
- Kohti huomista (2012)

Solo albums

- Bongo Rock (2014)
- Antaudun (2017)
- Cara Mia (2019)
- Kääntöpuoli (2023)

Singles

- "Ylös" (2015)
- "Niin varmaan" (featuring Kube) (2015)
- "Sol" (2015)
- "Puhu vaan" (2016)
- "Kato mua silmiin" (2016)
- "Otan sut haltuun" (2016)
- "Kosketa" (2016)
- "Momentumii" (2017)
- "Ihmeeni" (2017)
- "Ytimeen" (2018)
- "Kuinka paljon voi rakastaa" (2018)
- "Nyt" (2018)
- "Kyynelten virta" (2018)
- "Veitsenterällä" (2018)
- "Höyhen" (2023)
- "Sydämet palamaan" (2023)
