= Hatching (film) =

2022 film by Hanna Bergholm

- Theatrical release poster
- Finnish: Pahanhautoja
- Directed by: Hanna Bergholm
- Written by: Ilja Rautsi
- Produced by: Mika Ritalahti; Niko Ritalahti; Nima Yousefi
- Starring: Siiri Solalinna; Sophia Heikkilä; Jani Volanen; Reino Nordin
- Cinematography: Jarkko T. Laine
- Edited by: Linda Jildmalm
- Music by: Stein Berge Svendsen
- Production companies: Silva Mysterium; Hobab; Umedia; Film i Väst
- Distributed by: Nordisk Film
- Release dates: 23 January 2022 (Sundance); 4 March 2022 (Finland)
- Running time: 91 minutes
- Country: Finland
- Language: Finnish
- Budget: €3.95 million
- Box office: $659,009

Hatching (Finnish: Pahanhautoja lit. "Hatcher of Evil", a play on a Finnish idiom for nursing a grudge) is a 2022 Finnish satirical absurdist psychological body horror film directed by Hanna Bergholm, written by Ilja Rautsi and starring Siiri Solalinna, Sophia Heikkilä, Jani Volanen and Reino Nordin. It premiered at the Sundance Film Festival on 23 January 2022 and was released theatrically in Finland on 4 March 2022 by Nordisk Film. It won the Grand Prix and the Prix du Jury Jeunes at the Festival international du film fantastique de Gérardmer 2022.

The film centers on Tinja, a young gymnast desperate to please her mother, a woman obsessed with presenting the image of a perfect family to the world through her popular blog. One day, Tinja finds a mysterious egg, which she chooses to bring home. Once it hatches, she names the creature within "Alli", and cares for it as it grows into a doppelgänger that acts upon Tinja's repressed emotions.

== Plot ==
Twelve-year-old Tinja practices gymnastics, pressured by her image-obsessed mother, a former figure skater turned influencer. When a crow flies into the family house, her mother snaps the bird's neck and instructs her to dispose of it outside. That night, Tinja discovers the dying crow in the nearby woods and euthanises it with a stone. She brings the orphaned egg home and incubates it, hiding it from her family as it grows abnormally big. Tinja meets a new neighbour, a girl named Reetta, and her French Bulldog Roosa.

Returning home one day from gym practice, Tinja discovers Mother is having an affair with her handyman, Tero. Reetta joins Tinja at the next practice session, proving to be very talented. Seeing this, Mother pressures Tinja into practicing until her hand is blistered and bleeding.

The egg eventually hatches into a bizarre, human-sized, bird-like creature. It escapes but returns the next evening, injured by a shard of glass. She names the creature Alli, cares for it and lets it sleep underneath her bed. While sleeping, Tinja becomes annoyed by Roosa's barking. She awakens to find Alli on top of her with the dog's decapitated corpse beside her. When this makes her vomit, Alli eats it. Tinja buries Roosa in the backyard, unaware that her younger brother, Matias, is watching.

One evening, when Mother gives Tinja a hairbrush while neglecting Matias, he spitefully digs up Roosa's corpse. Later, when she is downstairs, he wears a mask and sneaks into her room to discover what is under her bed. Alli slashes his mask in fear. Tinja suffers a seizure, indicating that she and Alli are psychically linked.

The next day, Mother is displeased when Reetta wins the competition spot. Alli brutally attacks Reetta on her way home, while Tinja has another seizure. Tinja finds Alli's molted beak and realises the creature is beginning to look more like her. Later, Tinja brings Reetta flowers, horrified by the severity of her injuries and amputated left hand. Tinja returns home and punishes Alli by slapping herself; Alli comforts Tinja while she cries. In the morning, Alli looks fully human except for the pupils.

Since Reetta is hospitalised, Tinja is given her spot in the competition. Mother suggests she and Tinja stay with Tero for the weekend; Father implies that he knows about Tero. At Tero's, Tinja learns that he is a widower with an infant daughter named Helmi. Tero is sympathetic to Tinja, deducing she is not truly passionate about gymnastics. Later, when Tinja is feeding Alli, Tero interferes and the creature attacks him, injuring his hand. Despite this, he forgives Tinja and covers for her.

Mother arrives to take Tinja to the competition. When Mother fusses over Helmi and makes Tinja jealous, Tinja becomes fearful that Alli might attack Tero and Helmi while she is gone. As Tinja begins her routine, she mentally sees Alli, who is about to attack Helmi with an axe. Tinja sabotages herself and falls, injuring her wrist, which stops Alli. After the competition, Tero, who witnessed Alli's attempted attack, throws out Tinja and her mother, saying that Tinja has serious problems. Before they leave, Mother angrily blames Tinja for ruining her happiness.

At home, Mother finds Alli in Tinja's room and, mistaking the creature for Tinja, forcibly brushes her hair, injuring Alli in the process. Alli attacks Mother, but Tinja intervenes and Alli flees, screaming as the sides of its jaw rip open. Tinja explains that all the recent chaos is because of Alli, and they hunt down the creature. In Tinja's room, Alli overpowers Mother, who stabs it in the leg, also injuring Tinja. Tinja tries to explain that she hatched it, but Mother attacks again anyway, only to realise she has instead stabbed Tinja, who has jumped in front of Alli to protect her. Tinja collapses onto Alli and dies, her blood falling into the creature's mouth and completing its transformation. Alli, now looking exactly like Tinja, pushes Tinja's corpse aside. It utters the word "Mother" and stands up, looking down at her.

== Cast ==
- Siiri Solalinna as Tinja / Alli
  - Hertta Karén as Alli (early stages 2)
  - Jonna Aaltonen as Alli (early stages 1)
- Sophia Heikkilä as the mother
- Jani Volanen as the father
- Reino Nordin as Tero
- Oiva Ollila as Matias
- Ida Määttänen as Reetta
- Saija Lentonen as the coach
- Stella Leppikorpi as a gym friend
- Hertta Nieminen as a gym friend
- Aada Punakivi as a gym friend
- Miroslava Agejeva as Baby Helmi

== Production ==
=== Development ===
Director Hanna Bergholm began casting around 2018. Casting for the role of Tinja was described as challenging due to it being a demanding dual role, as the actor would be required to portray both Tinja and the monster Alli.

Filming began in July 2019 in Latvia.

=== Special effects ===
The creature was portrayed by an animatronic puppet, created by lead animatronic designer Gustav Hoegen and his team. As the monster evolves, instead of the puppet, it is played by different performers. The special effects make-up was designed by Academy Award-nominated effects artist Conor O'Sullivan.

== Release and marketing ==
In June 2020, IFC Midnight acquired US distribution rights to the film. Hatching premiered at the Sundance Film Festival on 23 January 2022. It was released theatrically in Finland on 4 March 2022 by Nordisk Film. In the United States, the film was released in select theaters on 29 April 2022 and on video on demand on 17 May.

A trailer was released in February 2021. Brad Miska of Bloody Disgusting commented on the trailer, comparing it favourably to the 1990 film Meet the Applegates and writing that it "sits comfortably toward the top of my must-see list." IndieWire's Eric Kohn also made mention of the film in their list of Cannes 2021 predictions, writing that it "could appeal to fans of the Swedish monster movie, Border — which won the Un Certain Regard prize at Cannes in 2018 — but with an extra dose of commentary of the social media curation of one's lives so many of us engage in."

== Reception ==
On the review aggregator website Rotten Tomatoes, 93% of 134 critics' reviews are positive, with an average rating of 7.3/10. The website's consensus reads: "A message movie with a hard horror shell, Hatching perches between beauty and revulsion – and establishes Hanna Bergholm as a bright new talent." Metacritic, which uses a weighted average, assigned the film a score of 75 out of 100, based on 25 critics, indicating "generally favorable" reviews. Hatching was ranked 10th on Rotten Tomatoes' list of the best horror films of 2022.

== See also ==
- The Knocking (2022 film)
- The Twin (2022 film)
