= Aftershock (2022 film) =

- Promotional poster
- Directed by: Paula Eiselt; Tonya Lewis Lee
- Produced by: Paula Eiselt; Tonya Lewis Lee
- Cinematography: Jenni Morello; Kerwin Devonish; Michael Crommett
- Edited by: Flavia de Souza; Sunita Prasad
- Music by: Chanda Dancy
- Production companies: Impact Partners; Malka Films; Good Gravy Films; JustFilms/Ford Foundation
- Distributed by: ABC News Studios; Onyx Collective; Hulu
- Release dates: January 23, 2022 (Sundance); July 19, 2022 (United States)
- Running time: 89 minutes
- Country: United States
- Language: English

Aftershock is a 2022 American documentary film directed and produced by Paula Eiselt and Tonya Lewis Lee. It follows Omari Maynard and Bruce McIntyre, whose partners died due to childbirth complications, which were preventable, as they fight for justice.

The film, executive produced by filmmaker Dawn Porter, premiered at the 2022 Sundance Film Festival on January 23, 2022. It was released on July 19, 2022, by ABC News Studios, Onyx Collective, and Hulu. It received critical acclaim.

== Plot ==
Aftershock is a documentary that sheds light on the systemic failures of the U.S. maternal health system, which disproportionately endanger the lives of Black women. Centered on the tragic, preventable deaths of Shamony Gibson and Amber Rose Isaac during childbirth, the film follows their grieving partners, Omari Maynard and Bruce McIntyre, as they transform their pain into purpose. Through their activism and community-building with other surviving Black fathers, they rally for justice, expose the historical roots of neglect and exploitation in gynecology, and demand institutional reform. Seamlessly blending intimate personal stories with searing historical analysis, Aftershock uplifts the resilience of families and birth workers striving to create a more equitable and compassionate maternal health system, while calling attention to an urgent national crisis.

== Release ==
Aftershock had its world premiere at the 2022 Sundance Film Festival on January 23, 2022. ABC News, Onyx Collective, and Hulu shortly after acquired distribution rights to the film. It also screened at South by Southwest on March 13, 2022.

== Reception ==
=== Critical response ===
On the review aggregator website Rotten Tomatoes, it has a 100% approval rating based on reviews from 28 critics, with an average rating of 8.10/10. The website's consensus reads: "Aftershock points a sobering spotlight on a public health crisis, maintaining a heartbreaking focus on its tragic human cost." Metacritic, which uses a weighted average, assigned the film a score of 87 out of 100 based on 7 critics, indicating "universal acclaim".

=== Accolades ===
Year	Award	Category	Nominee(s)	Result	Ref.
2022	Critics' Choice Documentary Awards	Best Documentary Feature	Aftershock	Nominated	
2022	Critics' Choice Documentary Awards	Best Political Documentary	Aftershock	Nominated	
2023	Black Reel Awards	Outstanding Documentary Feature	Tonya Lewis Lee, Paula Eiselt	Nominated	
2023	Golden Trailer Awards	Best Documentary Poster	Aftershock	Won	
2023	Peabody Awards	Documentary	Aftershock	Won	
