= Framing Agnes =

2022 Canadian film

- Film poster
- Directed by: Chase Joynt
- Written by: Chase Joynt; Morgan M. Page
- Produced by: Samantha Curley; Shant Joshi; Brooke Sebold
- Starring: Angelica Ross; Zackary Drucker; Jen Richards; Max Wolf Valerio; Silas Howard; Stephen Ira
- Cinematography: Aubree Bernier-Clarke
- Edited by: Cecilio Escobar; Brooke Sebold
- Production companies: Fae Pictures; Level Ground
- Release date: January 22, 2022 (Sundance)
- Running time: 75 minutes
- Country: Canada
- Language: English
- Box office: $48,147

Framing Agnes is a 2022 Canadian documentary film, directed by Chase Joynt. An examination of transgender histories, the film centres on Joynt and a cast of transgender actors reenacting various case studies from Harold Garfinkel's work with transgender clients at the University of California, Los Angeles.

== Synopsis ==
The film explores the concept of the trans icon. It uses a hybrid format, combining scholarly analysis with clips based on archived interviews, filmed with transgender actors.

== Background ==
The film is an expansion of Joynt's short film of the same title, which premiered in 2019.

== Cast ==
The cast includes Angelica Ross, Zackary Drucker, Jen Richards, Max Wolf Valerio, Silas Howard, and Stephen Ira.

== Release and reception ==
The film premiered at the 2022 Sundance Film Festival, where Joynt won both the Audience Award and the Innovator Prize in the NEXT program. In a critical review in Paste, Shayna Maci Warner wrote, "As a cinematic experience, the film feels pulled in several directions, formally incomplete and jagged." IndieWire's review was similarly mixed, commenting negatively on the high proportion of academic content in the documentary, making it "feel more a history class than a story."

The film was longlisted for the Jean-Marc Vallée DGC Discovery Award, and shortlisted for the DGC Allan King Award for Best Documentary Film at the 2022 Directors Guild of Canada awards.

On the review aggregator website Rotten Tomatoes, 80% of 40 critics' reviews are positive, with an average rating of 7.4/10. The website's consensus reads: "Framing Agnes may be frustratingly uneven as a work of cinematic storytelling, but that's often outweighed by its thoughtful expansion of established historical narrative." Metacritic, which uses a weighted average, assigned the film a score of 69 out of 100, based on 9 critics, indicating "generally favorable" reviews.
