= TikTok, Boom. =

2022 documentary film

TikTok, Boom. is a 2022 documentary film about the social media app TikTok.

== Production ==
The film is presented by Olive Hill Media, directed by Shalini Kantayya and produced by Campfire Studios. Campfire's Ross M. Dinerstein and Danni Mynard served as producers on the film alongside Executive Producers Rebecca Evans, Ross Girard, Michael Cho, Mimi Rode, and Tim Lee.

== Release ==
TikTok, Boom. premiered in competition at the 2022 Sundance Film Festival and was released on the PBS program Independent Lens on October 24, 2022. The film also became available that year in the US to stream on Prime Video.

== Reception ==
On the review aggregator website Rotten Tomatoes, 71% of 24 critics' reviews are positive, with an average rating of 6.4/10. The website's consensus reads: "Although it isn't as effortlessly engaging as the best content on the platform it's investigating, TikTok, Boom. offers a thoughtful look at modern social media."

Writing for Variety, film critic Owen Gleiberman applauded the film for its informative deep-dive into TikTok, citing its evaluation of censorship and ethics concerns as highlights. Conversely, he took issue with what he described as the film's "eagerness to accept and endorse the way TikTok operates", especially concerning its complicated algorithm.

The film was nominated for a News and Documentary Emmy for Outstanding Business and Economic Documentary on July 27, 2023.
