= Sundance Film Festival =

Annual film festival in the United States

Coordinates: 40°38′33″N 111°29′42″W

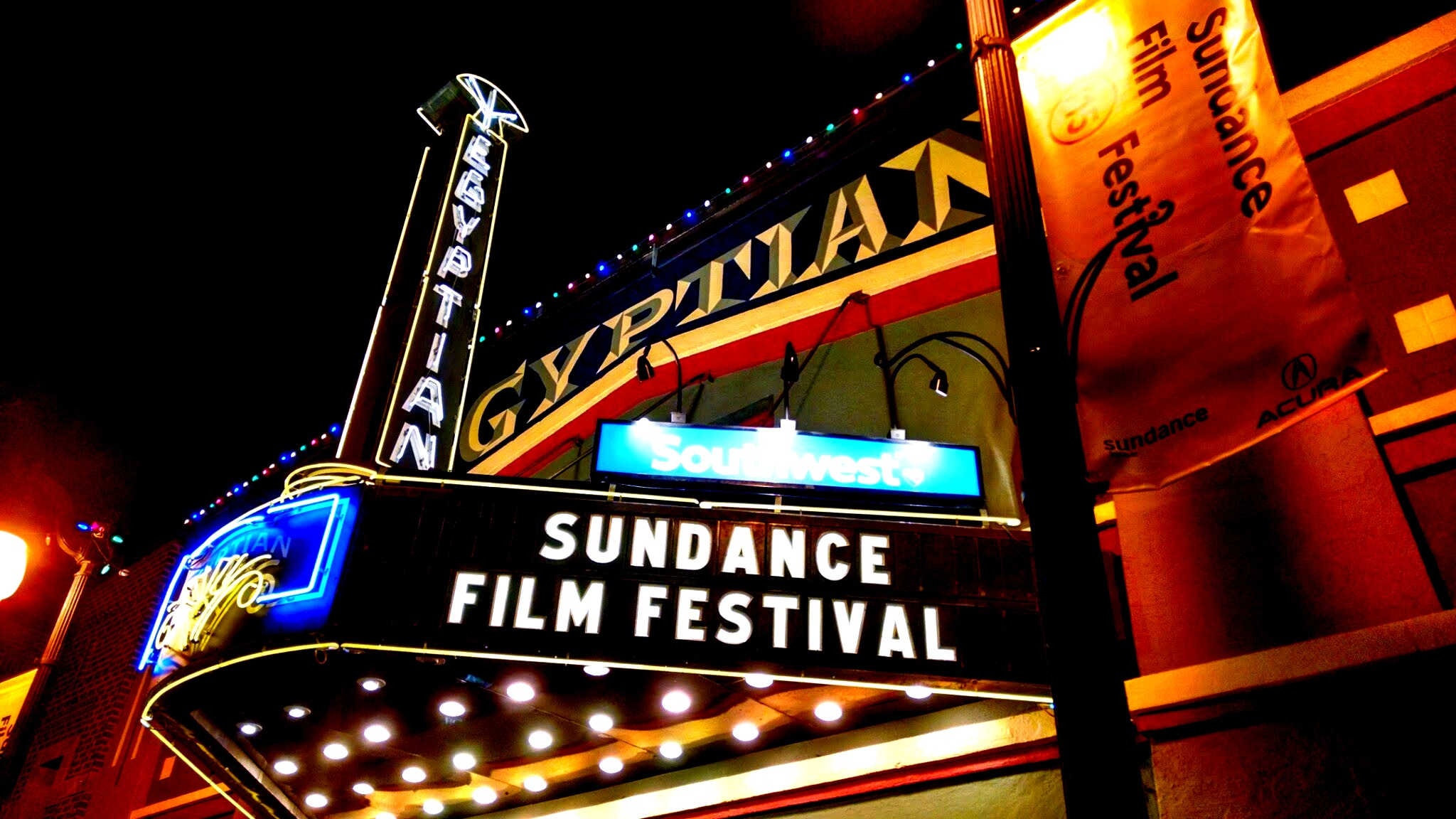
- Location: Park City, Utah, U.S. (has ceased hosting future festivals, but still serves as Utah location for Sundance Institute); Sundance Resort, Utah, U.S. (has ceased hosting festivals, but remains home of Sundance Institute Labs)
- Founded: August 1978; 48 years ago (as Utah/US Film Festival)
- Founded by: Robert Redford; Utah Film Commission; John Earle; Sterling Van Wagenen
- Awards: Grand Jury Prize Dramatic, Grand Jury Prize Documentary, Audience Award Dramatic, Audience Award Documentary
- Hosted by: Sundance Institute
- Language: English
- Website: festival.sundance.org

Current: 2026
- 2027 2025

The Sundance Film Festival is an annual film festival organized by the Sundance Institute. It is the largest independent film festival in the United States, with 423,234 combined in-person and online viewership in 2023.

The festival has acted as a showcase for new work from American and international independent filmmakers. The festival consists of competitive sections for American and international dramatic and documentary films, both feature films and short films, and a group of out-of-competition sections, including NEXT, New Frontier, Spotlight, Midnight, Sundance Kids, From the Collection, Premieres, and Documentary Premieres.

The festival was established in Salt Lake City, Utah, in 1978 as the Utah/US Film Festival. The festival moved to nearby Park City, Utah, in 1981 and was renamed the US Film and Video Festival. It was renamed the Sundance Film Festival in 1991.

From its inception, and through 2026, the festival took place every January in Utah. In March 2025, it was announced that the festival will be moving to Boulder, Colorado, for the 2027 festival and beyond. However, the Sundance Institute Labs shall remain at Sundance resort.

== History ==
=== 1978: Utah/US Film Festival ===
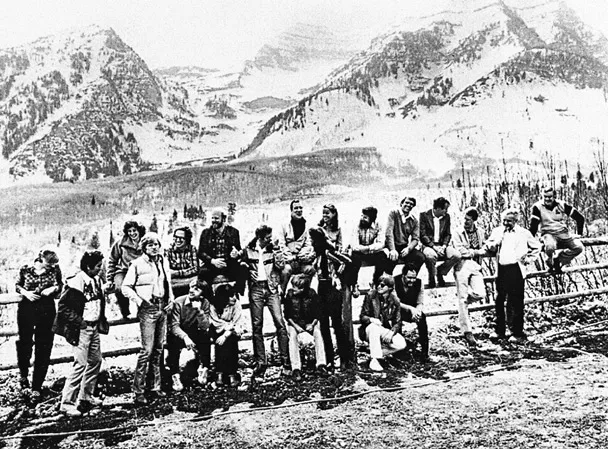
The first planning meeting for the embryonic Sundance Institute and arts center, near Redford's home in Provo Canyon.

Sundance began in Salt Lake City in August 1978 as the Utah/US Film Festival in an effort to attract more filmmakers to Utah. Robert Redford, who was based in the area, was its main founder, with the festival eventually being named for Redford's "Sundance" land he purchased in the nearby Wasatch Mountains; Redford had renamed this land after his character in Butch Cassidy and the Sundance Kid. It was also co-founded by Sterling Van Wagenen, head of Redford's company Wildwood Enterprises, Inc, John Earle and Cirina Hampton-Catania of the Utah Film Commission. The 1978 festival featured films such as Deliverance, A Streetcar Named Desire, Midnight Cowboy, Mean Streets, and Sweet Smell of Success.

The goal of the festival was to showcase American-made films, highlight the potential of independent film, and increase visibility for filmmaking in Utah. The main focus of the event was to conduct a competition for independent American films, present a series of retrospective films and filmmaker panel discussions, and celebrate the Frank Capra Award (not to be confused with the Frank Capra Achievement Award), which was established to recognize filmmakers who worked outside the mainstream Hollywood system. The festival also highlighted the work of regional filmmakers who worked outside the Hollywood system.

In 1979, Sterling Van Wagenen left to head up the first-year pilot program of what became the Sundance Institute, and James W. Ure took over briefly as executive director, followed by Cirina Hampton Catania, who was asked by Governor Matheson to help bring the festival into profitability as the governing board was preparing to disband it due to debts incurred in 1978. Catania generated sponsorships, in-kind contributions, and advertising revenue, and the festival continued. More than 60 films were screened at the festival that year, and panels featured many well-known Hollywood filmmakers. Also that year, the first Frank Capra Award went to Jimmy Stewart. The festival also made a profit for the first time.

=== 1981: US Film and Video Festival ===
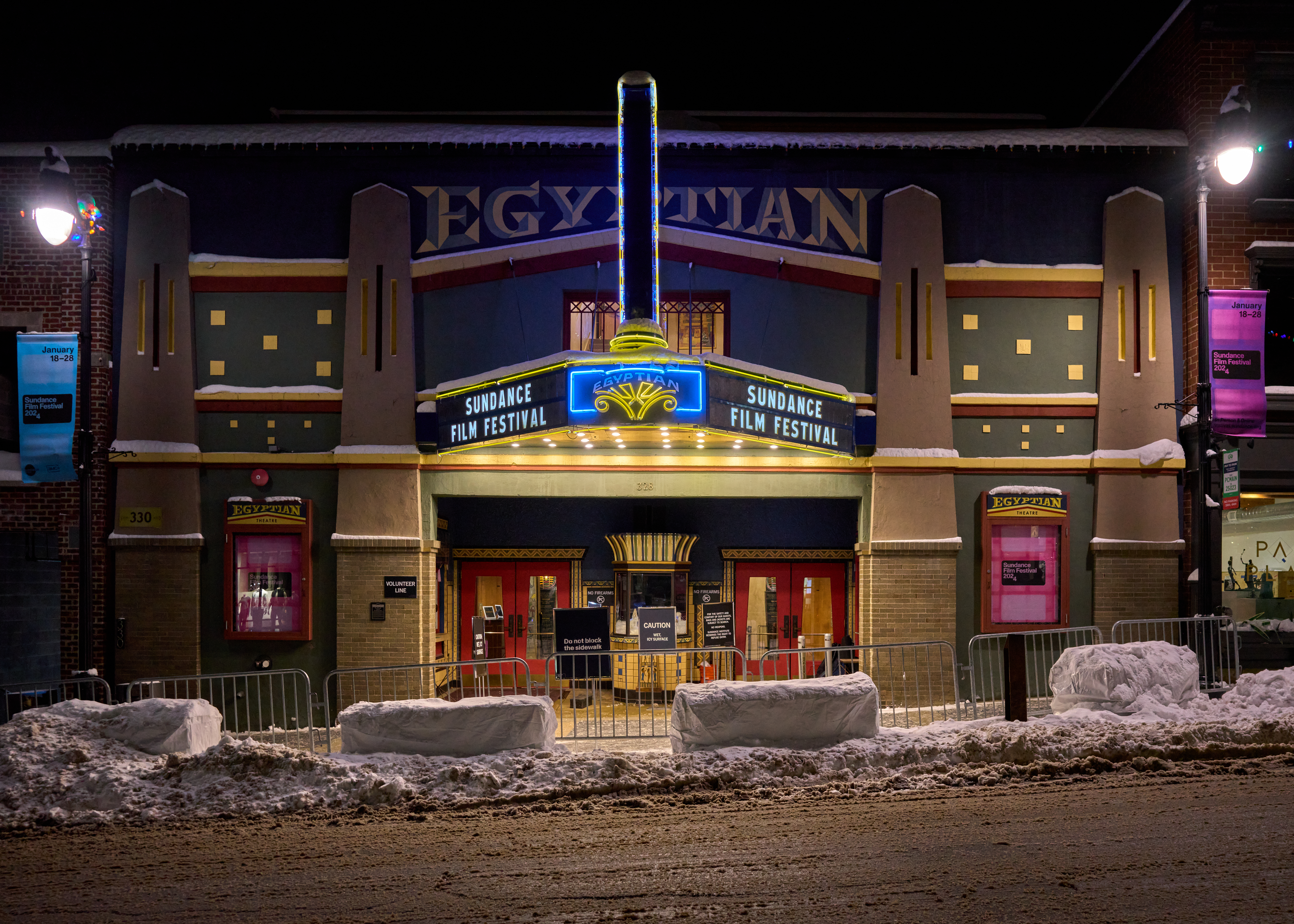
Mary G. Steiner Egyptian Theatre, in Park City, Utah, is one of the festival's oldest and most recognizable venues.

In 1981, the festival moved to Park City, Utah, and changed the dates from September to January. The move from late summer to midwinter was done by the executive director Susan Barrell with the cooperation of Hollywood director Sydney Pollack, who suggested that running a film festival in a ski resort during winter would draw more attention from Hollywood. It was named the US Film and Video Festival.

=== 1984: Sundance ===
In 1984, the now well-established Sundance Institute, headed by Sterling Van Wagenen, took over management of the US Film Festival. Gary Beer and Van Wagenen spearheaded production of the inaugural US Film Festival presented by Sundance Institute (1985), which included Program Director Tony Safford and Administrative Director Jenny Walz Selby. The branding and marketing transition from the US Film Festival to the Sundance Film Festival was managed under the direction of Colleen Allen, Allen Advertising Inc., by appointment of Robert Redford. In 1991, the festival was officially renamed the Sundance Film Festival, after Redford's Utah Sundance home, which had been named for his character the Sundance Kid from the film Butch Cassidy and the Sundance Kid.

The Sundance Film Festival experienced its extraordinary growth in the 1990s, under the leadership of Geoffrey Gilmore and John Cooper, who transformed the venue into the premier festival in the United States, on par with Cannes, Venice, Berlin, and Toronto International Film Festival (also known as The Big Five). That crucial era is documented in Professor Emanuel Levy's book, Cinema of Outsiders: The Rise of American Independent Cinema (NYU Press, 1999, 2001, 2011).

=== Growth and development ===
The festival has continued to evolve over the decades from a low-profile venue for small-budget, independent creators from outside the Hollywood system to a media extravaganza for Hollywood celebrity actors, paparazzi, and luxury lounges set up by companies not affiliated with Sundance. Festival organizers have tried curbing these activities in recent years, beginning in 2007 with their ongoing Focus On Film campaign.

The 2009 film Official Rejection documented the experience of small filmmakers trying to get into various festivals in the late 2000s, including Sundance. The film contained several arguments that Sundance had become dominated by large studios and sponsoring corporations. A contrast was made between the 1990s, in which non-famous filmmakers with tiny budget films could get distribution deals from studios like Miramax Films or New Line Cinema (like Kevin Smith's Clerks) and the 2000s, when major stars with multimillion-dollar films (like The Butterfly Effect with Ashton Kutcher) dominated the festival. Kevin Smith doubted that Clerks, if made in the late 2000s, would be accepted to Sundance.

Numerous small festivals sprung up around Sundance in the Park City area, including Slamdance, Nodance, Slumdance, It-dance, X-Dance, Lapdance, Tromadance, The Park City Film Music Festival, etc., though all except Slamdance are no longer held.

Sundance Film Festival, Main Street, Park City, Utah, 2014

Included in the Sundance changes made in 2010, a new programming category titled "NEXT" (often denoted simply by the characters "<=>", which mean "less is more") was introduced to showcase innovative films that are able to transcend the confines of an independent budget. Another recent addition was the Sundance Film Festival USA program, in which eight of the festival's films are shown in eight different theaters around the United States. The total economic benefits Sundance brought to Utah were estimated to be $167 million in 2020.

The festival went virtual in 2021 and 2022 because of the COVID-19 pandemic, cancelling on-site activities. During this period Sundance programmed and hosted the world premiere of the documentary film Jihad Rehab directed by Meg Smaker. Soon after its premiere, the film would be embroiled in controversy as one of the film's executive producers, Abigail Disney described the film as "freaking brilliant" in an email to the director before disavowing the film later on. Despite receiving rave reviews from Sundance audiences and critics, the film was unpopular among the Muslim-American and Middle Eastern indie film community. Then-festival director Tabitha Jackson took the unusual step of apologizing for the film's inclusion in the festival. As a result, the film was virtually blacklisted.

The festival returned for in-person showings in 2023.

Robert Redford died in 2025.

=== 2027: Festival relocation to Colorado ===
In 2023, it became known that the Sundance Institute had been considering moving the festival to another city; according to Deadline, possibly already when programming director Tabitha Jackson left in June 2022. According to director Hernandez, the festival had been in a "period of evolution for 5 years," when the pandemic "uprooted" audience behavior. Its contract to host the festival in Park City will expire following the 2026 festival. Also, the festival is considered to have outgrown the small resort town of Park City. Locals consider the festival bringing in too much traffic, plus the institute's decision to cancel the 2022 festival due to COVID concerns was viewed negatively. Initially, the aim was to announce a winning bid by the 2025 festival, but this was later pushed a month, to the end of April 2025.

During early talks, Bentonville, Arkansas, was mentioned. In July 2024 it was announced the process had selected six contenders for host city starting in 2027: Atlanta, Georgia; Boulder, Colorado; Cincinnati, Ohio; Louisville, Kentucky; Santa Fe, New Mexico; and current host city Park City in a united bid with Salt Lake City. Out of these, three finalists were selected in September: Park City/Salt Lake City, Boulder, and Cincinnati, which Deadline characterized as "a bit of the old, a bit of the new, and a bit of WTF".

The decision to remove cars from Main Street in January 2025 was popular with festival-goers, though whether this would be enough for Park City to retain the festival was unclear. At the time, Deadline considered the bid from Boulder to be the strongest contender. In March 2025, HB77, a proposal to ban the use of the Pride flag in state government buildings, reached Utah governor Spencer Cox, decreasing the chances of retaining the festival in Utah since it went against Sundance's expressed values of a "vibrant, inviting and inclusive festival".

On March 27, 2025, it was announced that a ten-year deal had been reached for the festival to be held in Boulder, Colorado, beginning with the 2027 edition. However, despite the festival being transferred to Colorado, the Sundance Institute Labs shall remain at Sundance resort, with the Sundance Institute also maintaining a presence in Utah and keeping its Utah headquarters in Park City.

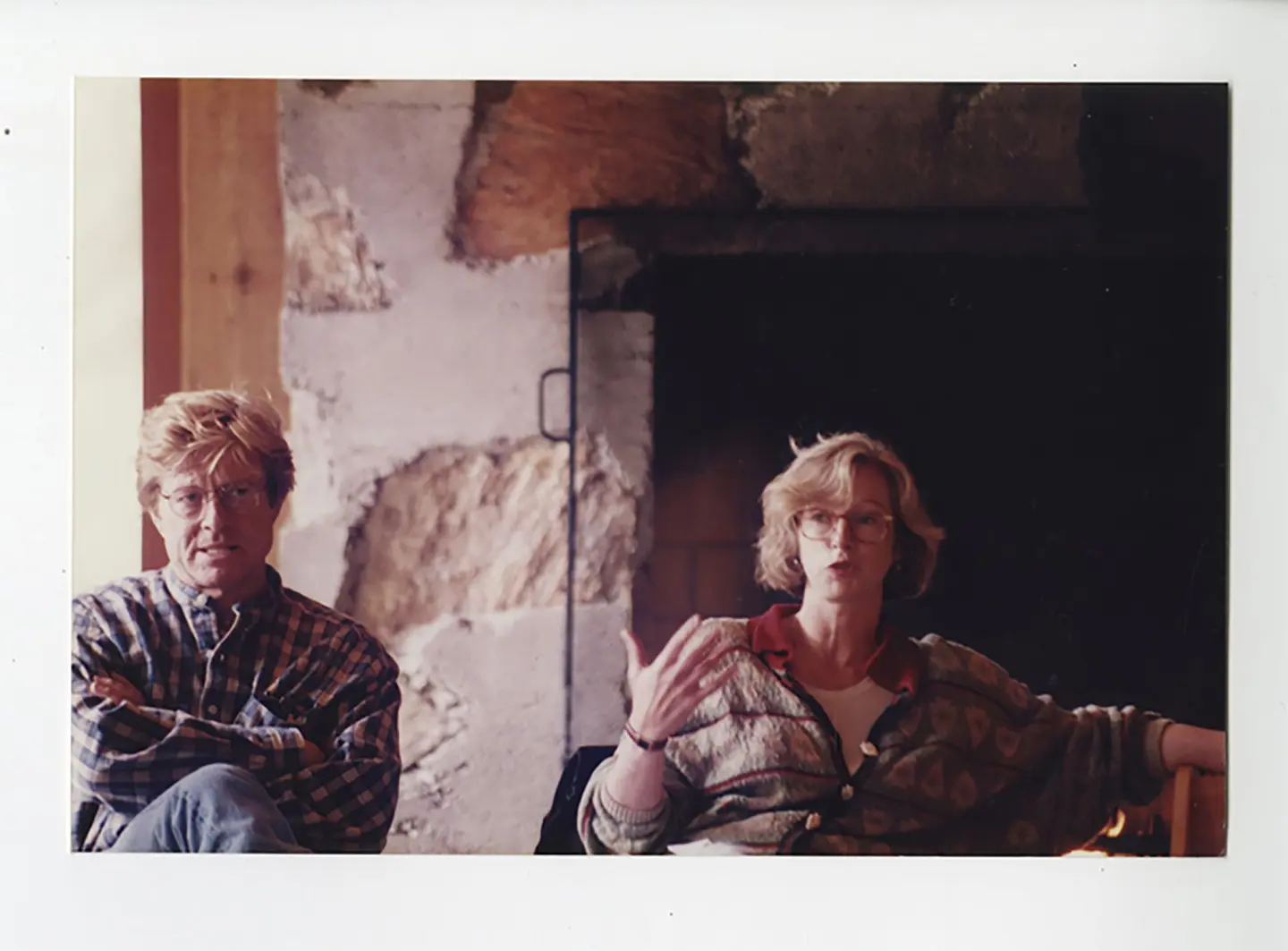
Robert Redford & Michelle Satter at Sundance's first June Filmmakers Lab 1981

=== Festival directors ===
- Geoff Gilmore – 1991–2009
- John Cooper – 2009–2020
- Tabitha Jackson – 2020–2022
- Eugene Hernandez – 2022–present

== Spin-offs in other locations ==
=== Sundance London (2012–2024) ===
UK-based publisher C21 Media first revealed in October 2010 that Robert Redford was planning to bring the Sundance Film Festival to London, and in March the following year, Redford officially announced that Sundance London would be held at The O2, in London from April 26 to 29, 2012; the first time it has traveled outside the US.

In a press statement, Redford said, "We are excited to partner with AEG Europe to bring a particular slice of American culture to life in the inspired setting of The O2, and in this city of such rich cultural history. [...] It is our mutual goal to bring to the UK, the very best in current American independent cinema, to introduce the artists responsible for it, and in essence, help build a picture of our country that is broadly reflective of the diversity of voices not always seen in our cultural exports."

The majority of the film screenings, including the festival's premieres, would be held within the Cineworld cinema at The O2 entertainment district. The 2013 Sundance London Festival was held April 25–28, 2013.

Sundance London 2014 took place on April 25–27, 2014, at The O2 Arena; however the 2015 Festival was cancelled in an announcement on January 16, 2015.

Sundance London returned to London from June 2–5, 2016, and again June 1–4, 2017, both at Picturehouse Central in London's West End. The 2018 and 2019 events continued at the same venue.

Films shown at the 2019 event included Emma Thompson and Mindy Kaling's Late Night, the controversial dark tale The Nightingale, US comedy Corporate Animals, Lulu Wang's The Farewell (which won the Audience Award) and Sophie Hyde's film based on Emma Jane Unsworth's novel about female friendship, Animals.

The 2020 event in London was postponed due to the impact of the COVID-19 pandemic. It was not rescheduled until July 2021.

After the 2024 event, it was confirmed Sundance would not return to London in 2025.

=== Sundance Hong Kong (2014–2019) ===
Inaugurated in 2014, Sundance Film Festival: Hong Kong has taken place in 2016, 2017, 2018 and from September 19 to October 1, 2019. It was held at The Metroplex in Kowloon Bay.

The 2020 events in Hong Kong were postponed due to the COVID-19 pandemic and as of 2021 has not been rescheduled. Because of Chinas crackdown on democratic freedoms, the festival relocated to Jakarta in 2022.

=== Sundance Asia (2022-2024) ===
Started as Sundance Hong Kong in 2014, the festival renamed itself Sundance Asia and moved to Jakarta in 2022. It was held in Taipei in 2023 and 2024.

For the 2026 season, Sundance opted to highlight Asian filmmakers at the main festival (in the United States) instead.

=== Sundance at BAM (2006–2008) ===
From 2006 through 2008, Sundance Institute collaborated with the Brooklyn Academy of Music (BAM) on a special series of film screenings, performances, panel discussions, and special events bringing the institute's activities and the festival's programming to New York City.

== Festival's significance ==
Many notable independent filmmakers received their big break at Sundance, including Kevin Smith, Robert Rodriguez, Quentin Tarantino, Todd Field, David O. Russell, Steve James, Paul Thomas Anderson, Steven Soderbergh, Darren Aronofsky, James Wan, Edward Burns, Damien Chazelle, Lee Isaac Chung, Jane Schoenbrun, Molly Gordon, Nick Lieberman, A. V. Rockwell and Jim Jarmusch. The festival is also responsible for bringing wider attention to such films as Common Bonds, Saw, Garden State, American Psycho, Super Troopers, The Blair Witch Project, Spanking the Monkey, Reservoir Dogs, Primer, In the Bedroom, Better Luck Tomorrow, Little Miss Sunshine, Donnie Darko, El Mariachi, Moon, Clerks, Thank You for Smoking, Sex, Lies, and Videotape, The Brothers McMullen, 500 Days of Summer, Napoleon Dynamite, Whiplash (which topped the festival's Top 10 Films of All Time in 2024, as the result of a survey conducted with over 500 filmmakers and critics in honor of the festival's 40th anniversary), CODA, Boyhood, We're All Going to the World's Fair, Theater Camp and A Thousand and One.

Three Seasons was the first in festival history to ever receive both the Grand Jury Award and Audience Award, in 1999. Later films that won both awards are: God Grew Tired of Us in 2006 (documentary category), Quinceañera in 2006 (dramatic category), Precious in 2009, Fruitvale (later retitled Fruitvale Station) in 2013, Whiplash in 2014, Me and Earl and the Dying Girl in 2015, The Birth of a Nation in 2016, Minari in 2020, and CODA in 2021.

== Best Picture results ==
Films
Year	Title	Director	Result	Ref.
1986	Hannah and Her Sisters	Woody Allen	Nominated	
1987	Moonstruck	Norman Jewison	Nominated	
1994	Four Weddings and a Funeral	Mike Newell	Nominated	
2001	In the Bedroom	Todd Field	Nominated	
2006	Little Miss Sunshine	Jonathan Dayton and Valerie Faris	Nominated	
2009	An Education	Lone Scherfig	Nominated	
2009	Precious	Lee Daniels	Nominated	
2010	The Kids Are All Right	Lisa Cholodenko	Nominated	
2010	Winter's Bone	Debra Granik	Nominated	
2012	Beasts of the Southern Wild	Benh Zeitlin	Nominated	
2014	Boyhood	Richard Linklater	Nominated	
2014	Whiplash	Damien Chazelle	Nominated	
2015	Brooklyn	John Crowley	Nominated	
2016	Manchester by the Sea	Kenneth Lonergan	Nominated	
2017	Call Me by Your Name	Luca Guadagnino	Nominated	
2017	Get Out	Jordan Peele	Nominated	
2020	The Father	Florian Zeller	Nominated	
2020	Judas and the Black Messiah	Shaka King	Nominated	
2020	Promising Young Woman	Emerald Fennell	Nominated	
2020	Minari	Lee Isaac Chung	Nominated	
2021	CODA	Sian Heder	Won	
2023	Past Lives	Celine Song	Nominated	
2025	Train Dreams	Clint Bentley	Nominated	

== Awards ==
- Alfred P. Sloan Prize
- Audience Award Documentary
- Audience Award Dramatic
- Directing Award Documentary
- Directing Award Dramatic
- Grand Jury Prize Documentary
- Grand Jury Prize Dramatic
- Jonathan Oppenheim Editing Award
- Waldo Salt Screenwriting Award

== See also ==
- List of Sundance Film Festival award winners
- List of Sundance Film Festival selections
- Sundance TV
- Indiewood
