= Meg Smaker =

American filmmaker

Meg Smaker (born c. 1980) is an American documentary filmmaker, editor, and producer known for the documentary shorts Boxeadora (2015) and Methel Island (2014) and especially for her feature documentary Jihad Rehab (2022), (later retitled The UnRedacted), and the controversy surrounding it. Her films have won several awards.

== Biography ==
Smaker was a firefighter for six years in California, during which time the September 11 attacks occurred. In her desire to understand the attack, she left the United States about six months after the attacks at the age of 21, hitchhiked by herself through Afghanistan, and settled in Sanaa, Yemen. She spent five years in Yemen, learning Arabic, studying Islam, and teaching firefighting. All together she spent "over a decade living and working in the Middle East".

Smaker also traveled in the Western hemisphere. When she was 23 years old, she was kidnapped for ten days by the AUC, an anti-Marxist paramilitary group, while traveling from Panama to Colombia. The AUC was known for disemboweling and decapitating their victims in front of their families and burning villages to the ground to "send a message" to anyone thinking of cooperating with its Marxist enemies.^{1:46:43} Smaker survived the kidnapping "pretty unscathed", but left her shaken by "how normal these people were" (some of them teenage girls), and their ability to go from disemboweling human beings "to talking about makeup and their favorite football team".^{1:54:30} "It was unnerving to think that the people in the world who did the worst deeds were no different than me",^{1:53:10} and the experience sent her on a "trajectory" to try to understand "the other", "the evil doers" of the world, that led to the making of The UnRedacted.

Smaker has an MFA in documentary film from Stanford University. Among the awards her short films have won are Best Short Documentary at SXSW and a Student Academy Award.

== Controversy over Jihad Rehab ==
Smaker's documentary Jihad Rehab/The Unredacted centers on four former Guantánamo detainees who were sent to a Saudi rehabilitation center for accused terrorists, and is based on 16 months of filming inside the rehab center. The film was invited to the 2022 Sundance Festival -- "one of the most prestigious showcases in the world". According to The New York Times, "film critics warned that conservatives might bridle" at the sympathetic portrayals of the inmates "but reviews after the festival's screening were strong". However, it was Arab and Muslim filmmakers and their white supporters, not conservatives, who denounced the film, leading Sundance to apologize for having ever accepted it. According to one Arab documentarian, Assia Boundaoui, "to see my language and the homelands of folks in my community used as backdrops for white savior tendencies is nauseating".

By September 2022, The New York Times reported

Ms. Smaker's film has become near untouchable, unable to reach audiences. Prominent festivals rescinded invitations, and critics in the documentary world took to social media and pressured investors, advisers and even her friends to withdraw names from the credits. She is close to broke.

Smaker laments that the attacks on her film began before the critics had had a chance to see it, and that in their eagerness to separate themselves from her, people she considered friends and who had praised the film to her personally, now refused to speak to her, and/or told falsehoods about her and the film.

The Times reported Smaker's fear that "I don’t have the money or influence to fight this out", having "maxed out credit cards and, at age 42, borrowed money" from her working-class parents. Smaker created a GoFundMe to attempt to fund self-distribution of the film. She told her story in interviews and podcasts and requested donations from the public. Her efforts were successful -- by October 26, 2022 she had raised more than $600,000 from more than 8,000 individual donors. She is now working to make the film publicly available.
