= Maryna Er Gorbach =

Ukrainian film director

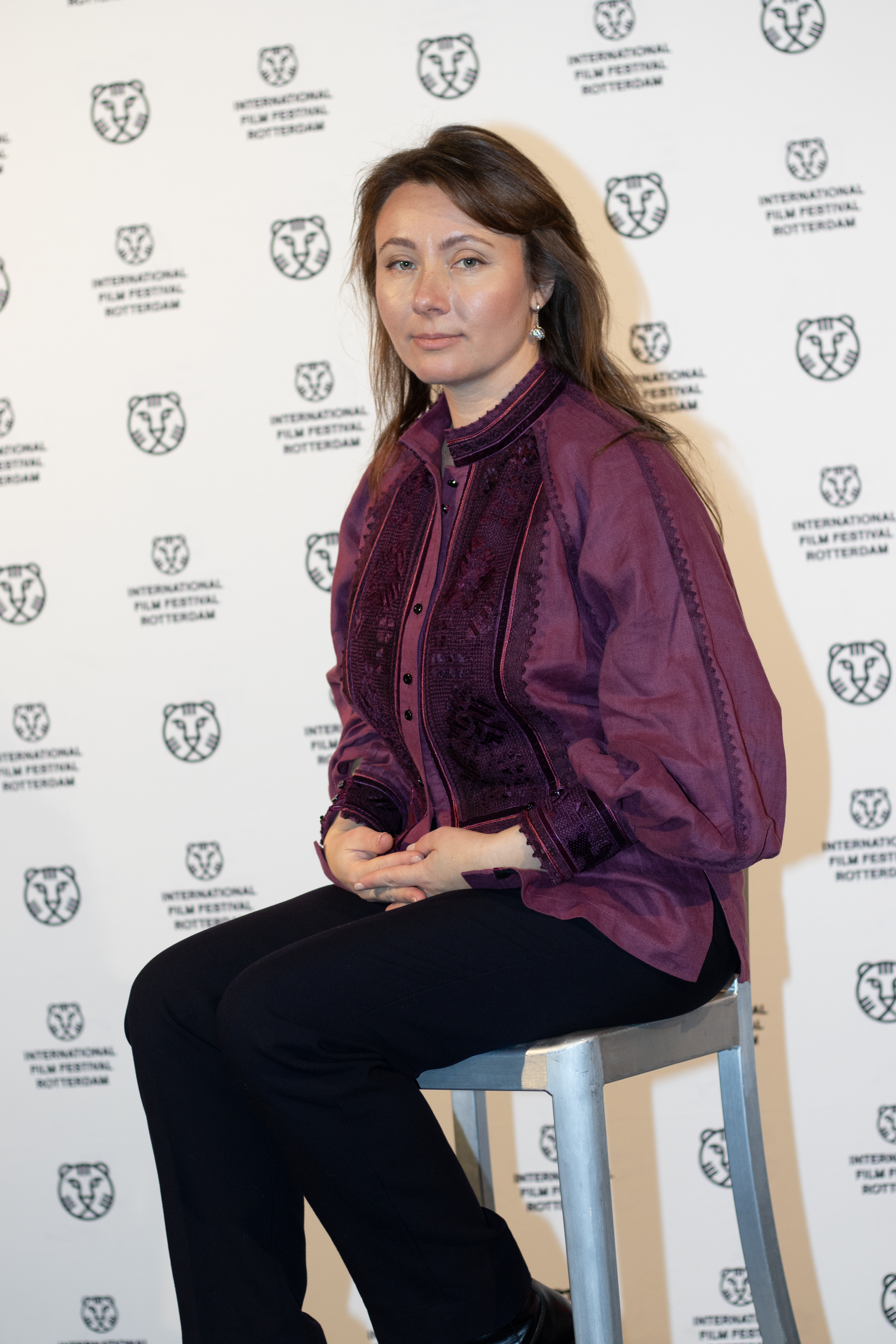
Maryna Er Gorbach

Maryna Er Gorbach (born 1981, Kyiv) is a Ukrainian filmmaker who writes, directs, produces, and edits films, often with her husband, Turkish filmmaker Mehmet Bahadir Er. She won the directing award in the World Cinema Dramatic Competition at the 2022 Sundance Film Festival for her film Klondike. She was among a group of Ukrainian filmmakers who called for international aid for Ukraine in the 2022 Russian invasion of Ukraine.

Maryna Er Gorbach has been a member of the European Film Academy since 2017. Like a number of other Ukrainian artists, Er Gorbach wrote an open letter in March 2022 after the Russian invasion of Ukraine, calling for a halt to the war. Her funded project, Silk Road is described as a Ukraine–Europe road narrative focusing on a woman separated from her children due to the war, while continuing to work in Kyiv during the conflict.

Her short film Rotation premiered at IFFR 2026 as one of the first projects funded through the Displacement Film Fund.

== Filmography ==
Year	Title	Notes	Ref
2009	Black Dogs Barking	co-directed with Mehmet Bahadir Er	
2013	Love Me	co-directed with Mehmet Bahadir Er	
2019	Omar and Us	co-directed with Mehmet Bahadir Er	
2022	Klondike		
