= Jihad Rehab =

2022 documentary film about former jihadists

The UnRedacted, first released as Jihad Rehab, is a 2022 documentary film which follows a group of former jihadists who have been released from Guantanamo Bay detention camp to the Prince Mohammed Bin Nayef Center for Advice and Care, a rehabilitation center for Islamist jihadis in Saudi Arabia. The film was conceived and directed by Meg Smaker. It premiered at the 2022 Sundance Film Festival in the U.S. Documentary Competition on 22 January 2022 and earned generally "strong" reviews, described as "humanizing" and powerful.

However, the film was also attacked for allegedly being "yet another story about Muslims as terrorists", thereby “recycling 'harmful and Islamophobic narratives'", for taking up space that could have gone to 'Muslim, and/or MENASA filmmakers' to tell non-terrorism related stories, and for allegedly "endangering its subjects". The work has been defended by the National Review, The Atlantic, and The New York Times. They noted the film was widely praised (including by people who now condemn it) until a campaign by Muslim and Arab filmmakers on social media, that (assisted by legal threats), led to the withdrawal of invitations from other film festivals and to the shunning of the film by distributors. As of October 2022 the film is unavailable to the general public.

== Story ==
Smaker's documentary centers on four men, who after spending 15 years as detainees in Guantánamo military prison were sent to "the world's first terrorist rehabilitation center" in Saudi Arabia. Smaker had heard about the center while working in Yemen and was determined to interview the men inside. The film "took over five years" to make: a year to get access from the Saudis, three years of filming of the subjects—a year and a half each in the rehab and then after they get out and try to find jobs, marry and settle down—and finally two years of editing.^{:6:24} During the first year of applying for access, the Saudis "kept saying no,” but they eventually would allow her to go in with the stipulation that she "couldn’t film any inmates unless they agreed to be filmed," a requirement she thinks was intended to get her to give up on the film. “They wanted to be able to say, 'We tried. Sorry!'”.

Out of more than 150 prisoners she interviewed, only a handful agreed to be in the film. “Then something serendipitous happened.” Smaker discovered a group of nine men from Yemen, where she had spent five years learning Arabic and working. “...I started talking in the thickest Yemeni accent I could muster. And as soon as I started speaking, their heads all popped up, like, 'What the fuck? There’s this white woman speaking our mother tongue.'” After several hours of discussion with her, three of the Yemenis agreed to talk with her individually. (Smaker and Journalist Graeme Wood believe her good fortune also makes it highly unlikely her subjects were planted by the Saudi government.) The men "opened their lives to her, speaking of their youthful attraction" to Al Qaeda and the Taliban, "of torture endured, and of regrets".

Smaker categorizes these men as tending to fall into one of the four general types, each having a different primary motivation for joining up and each represented by one of the subjects of the film. The motivations were:

1. "The Cause", belief that they were fighting persecution of Muslims, and fulfilling religious duty;^{1:01:00}
2. economic necessity, specifically the need for employment;
3. "peer pressure", usually in the form of traditional family obedience to father or older brother;^{1:03:31}
4. adventure; a motivation for younger men who were bored with school and didn't want to get a regular job.^{1:04:15}

In Smaker's words, what she most loves about the film is that "this is our [Americans'] first opportunity to hear" directly from people we've spent the "last 20 years of the war on terror" talking about; and that hearing from and trying to understand these jihadis is especially important because "when you try to fix a problem you don't understand you usually make it worse".^{:7:00}

== Reception ==
=== Critical response ===
The review aggregator website Rotten Tomatoes reported a 69% approval rating with an average rating of 6.60/10, based on 12 critic reviews.

The film was accepted to the Sundance Film Festival and to South by Southwest film festival, and won the Audience Award at the 38th Warsaw Film Festival. Tomris Laffly of Variety described the film as feeling like "a miracle and an interrogative act of defiance." Jordan Hoffman of The Guardian rated the film 4 out of 5 stars and stated "This is a movie for intelligent people looking to have their preconceived notions challenged." Lorraine Ali at Los Angeles Times wrote that the documentary was "a humanizing journey through a complex emotional process of self-reckoning and accountability, and a look at the devastating fallout of flawed U.S. and Saudi policy." Ronda Racha Penrice at TheWrap wrote that "It's hard to overstate the power of Smaker's debut documentary." Jordan Mintzer at The Hollywood Reporter wrote "Megan Smaker gives viewers the rare chance to get up close and personal with the men of no nation, territory or uniform that President Bush kept locked up for so long."

Other reviews were much more negative. Pat Mullen at POV Magazine thought Jihad Rehab "mostly reinforces the stereotypes that exploded post-9/11". Abby Sun at Filmmaker writes that Smaker is guilty of "unapologetically anti-Muslim jingoism cloaked in a no-less objectionable paternalistic humanitarianism". Davide Abbatescianni, of The New Arab, acknowledged that "Smaker sheds light, at least in part, on some of the rehabilitation center's practices and controversies," but accused her of failing to "treat her subjects ... with adequate depth and fairness."

=== Campaign against it and response by festival organizers ===
Sundance Film Festival announced its lineup of films for its 2022 festival on December 9, 2021, including a world premiere of Jihad Rehab on January 22. Smaker was enormously pleased as, "there is no better festival to premier at than Sundance. It can literally make your whole entire career and it can launch your film." Sundance normally receives approximately 15,000 submissions and accepts 16 for its festival.^{1:23:08}

According to Smaker, attacks against her film started the day after the lineup announcement, and "way before anyone had seen the film",^{1:08:53} outside of those who had seen sample screenings and signed nondisclosure agreements.

The National Review characterized the response to the film as a cancellation campaign:

One by one, people who had worked on the film were tracked down and accused of being Islamophobic. One person, who had done nothing but advise Smaker on how to get her hard drives through U.S. customs, was told that she would be publicly outed as Islamophobic if her name remained in the credits. Calls also went out to the composer, consultants, advisers, and even people in the special-thanks section of the credits. Shortly after, people started to ask that their names be removed. Finally, [executive producer] Abigail Disney buckled.

Approximately 35 people contacted Smaker and "asked please take my name off your film".^{3:02:18} Smaker has given an example of the campaign from one of her team who emailed her shortly after the Sundance had made its announcement and was "very shaken".^{1:19:17} He told her that after he posted on social media how excited he was that he had translated a film that was getting into Sundance, he was messaged by someone telling him “you have to come out publicly against this film and tell them its Islamophobic". He replied he hadn't seen the film yet but that the footage he had seen was "very humanistic" not Islamophobic. He was messaged back saying, in effect, "you are either with us or against us and if you don't come out publicly against the film we are essentially going to blacklist you. And you'll never work as a translator in the documentary community again."^{1:18:49}

Assuming the attacks were a "misunderstanding" by Muslims who wrongly believed her film was another anti-Muslim take on terrorism, Smaker invited her critics "to come and meet me and meet Muhammad and talk to us and ask us any questions they wanted and then screen the film".^{1:25:15} The critics of the film refused and said they were offended by being asked to sign a non-disclosure agreement (which Smaker insists is industry standard").^{1:26:02} Smaker had hoped Sundance would insist that the critics of the film watch it before any discussion, but instead "there was meeting after meeting" with the critics and Smaker, where the film festival heads had Smaker "jump through hoops" in the form of spending $20,000 for "an outside review board to look over our film", something Sundance "didn't ask any other film to do".^{1:30:40}

Following this criticism from "Muslim and MENA filmmakers," Abigail Disney, who served as an executive producer of the film, formally apologized and offered a call to action for more gatekeepers to be mindful of ethical representation in authorship and programming. In February 2022, Sundance Institute CEO Joana Vicente and former Sundance Film Festival Director Tabitha Jackson formally apologized for screening the film, saying that "the showing of this film hurt members of our community — in particular, individuals from Muslim and MENASA communities".

Muslim and MENA filmmakers have called for

mandatory anti-Islamophobia training for the staff of the Sundance Institute; an accounting of the racial and religious identities of Sundance filmmakers who cover MENASA topics; and a commitment to support more filmmakers who looked like them by “diversifying your screeners, reviewers, programmers, [and] implementing external accountability partners (with particular emphasis on increased Muslim, Middle Eastern, South Asian and African representation).

After Sundance, most other festivals canceled their invitations of the film. South by Southwest cancelled their screening, as did the San Francisco Documentary Film Festival, where Smaker had been told she had been selected to receive the Vanguard Award for the film which was also withdrawn.^{:1:58:18} (According to critic of the film Murtaza Hussain, the film "has gone through a few small but important changes since its original release at Sundance ... that correspond with objections raised to the original production".)

On October 3, 2022, director Meg Smaker created a GoFundMe page to raise money towards self-distributing the film. As of October 26, 2022, the campaign raised more than $700,000 from more than 10,000 individual donors (out of a stated goal of $200,000).

== Controversy ==
=== Charges against ===
The criticisms of the film by independent Muslim filmmakers, activists and critics are varied and have evolved since they first were made. They include:

Whiteness

More than 230 filmmakers signed a letter denouncing the documentary, noting that of the 76 films about Muslims in the Middle East that were screened at Sundance in the past 20 years, only 35 per cent were directed by Muslim or Arab creators. A majority of the letter's signatories had not seen the film.

Similarly, filmmaker Violeta Ayala described the production as an "entirely white team behind a film about Yemeni and South Arabian men". Taking the opposite tack, Gail Helt and Clive Stafford Smith accused Smaker of “hyping" and making a "straw-person thing" over this issue (i.e. the claim that Smaker was "Islamophobic" and it was ethical for a white woman like her to make a film about Muslims imprisoned for terrorism), because it was the least persuasive of the complaints against her.

In reply, Smaker says that “all the original articles about the film talk about Islamophobia and being harmful to the [Muslim] community. That was the original attack, and it only moved to the other things when it came out that my executive producer, co-producer, and assistant editor were all Muslim", and that we also "worked with two Islamic scholars and an Imam on this film ..."^{1:42:00}

Unfair labeling

Critics claimed that the film labeled "men as 'terrorists' who haven't been accused of actual crimes," and that they were "being framed as criminals (despite never standing trial in the U.S. or Saudi [Arabia])". However the film itself notes that "neither the United States nor Saudi Arabia" has ever put the men on trial let alone convicted them, and provides evidence that the "circumstances of their imprisonment in Guantánamo were disgraceful, even downright torturous", according to Graeme Wood. That aside, some of the film's subjects candidly describe their involvement with terrorism within the film itself.

Stereotypes

Critics have also claimed that the film reinforces negative connotations of the term "jihad" and "offensive stereotypes about Muslims". Lorraine Ali, a television critic for the Los Angeles Times who is Muslim, disagreed with this criticism, calling the film "a humanizing journey," that "took pains to understand the culture these men came from and molded them." Jihad Turk, the former imam of Los Angeles's largest mosque, described the film as "introspective and intelligent". In addition to the positive reviews above, non-critics author/podcaster Sam Harris (Note: Sam Harris states: "Remarkably compassionate and humanizing ... It's literally impossible to view the film and not have serious misgivings on how we've conducted the war on terror."^{0:48:20}) and Morning Joe host Joe Scarborough^{:3:10} both noted how struck they were by the film's humanizing of the inmates. Smaker herself states that before its premier the film was screened “with the Yemeni community, with the Muslim community”, with progressive activists;^{1:25:51} and again after Sundance with leaders of the Muslim community in the San Francisco Bay Area and with the Yemeni Student Union, to make sure she hadn't missed something. The viewers “all had pretty positive reactions to it”,^{2:53:44} none complaining of any Islamophobia in the film.^{1:25:51}

==== Alleged unethicalness ====
Davide Abbatescianni, among others, accuses Smaker of failing "to embrace some essential ethical principles of non-fiction filmmaking – above all, the subjects' safety and consent." Wood, on the other hand, writes that after receiving complaints by Muslim and Arab filmmakers but before showing the film,

Sundance demanded that Smaker provide an independent review of the film’s ethics and any danger that the words might pose to those on camera. Sundance gave her a long weekend, an absurdly short time, to commission outside experts and lawyers to provide a report. She improvised and adapted, paid lawyers at weekend rates, and at a cost of nearly $20,000 was handed a report that cleared the film of ethical lapses. Judith Matloff of Columbia Journalism School watched a cut of the film, interviewed Smaker and others, and wrote on the basis of their answers that “they have met or exceeded standard industry protocols to protect the security” of their subjects.

Wood breaks down the most "serious charges" made by "fellow filmmakers" and activists against Smaker's film as:

1. Jihad Rehab was made at the behest of the Saudi state,
2. its subjects did not or could not consent to their appearances,
3. it does not sufficiently stress the strain and inhumanity they have faced in U.S. and Saudi custody, and
4. the film endangers its subjects.

Wood (who has spent some time in Saudi Arabia and interviewed its ruler, Crown Prince Mohammed bin Salman) notes that at least one statement in the film, that Mohammed bin Salman took power in a “political coup”, totally disqualifies the first complaint, as such a "claim could not possibly have been made in a film controlled by the Saudi state".

Smaker describes the charge that the subjects didn't give consent and were "forced to do this by the Saudi government", as the third charge made by the critics of the film, and replies that "literally if they'd just talked to me I could have told them how I got access .. and how I talked to over a 150 of these guys and most of them didn't want to do it";^{1:42:42} "everyone signed consent forms both in English and in Arabic."^{1:43:10} A couple of critics (Pat Mullen, Abby Sun) note that a couple of subjects seemed uncomfortable being questioned or that there were "scenes where a participant asks Smaker to stop filming". They speculate that "the men are being re-traumatized by the interrogation process" (Mullen), or that "Smaker continuing to use the scenes depicted" because "she had an overwhelming desire to establish participants were 'backsliding' from the center's lessons ..." (Sun).

In answer to the claim of one critic that since a prisoner “cannot freely consent to anything ... particularly one in a notoriously violent dictatorship,” the subjects' agreements' to be interviewed and filmed are void and the film should not have been made, Michael Powell of The New York Times wrote, "this is a debatable proposition. Journalists often interview prisoners, and documentaries like The Thin Blue Line give powerful voice to them, without necessarily clearing this purist hurdle of free consent." Smaker herself argues in reply to the accusation that her interviews amount to “torture statements,” that the ethical standards advocated by critics would ensure that "no film was ever made about Saudi prisoners".

Endangering subjects

According to the Guardian newspaper, in July 2022, former Guantanamo prisoners penned an open letter to the film's team asking it to be withdrawn from festivals and cited their fear that the film put them in danger, with at least one signatory noting he had told Smaker that he did not wish to appear in the film. However, in an October 2022 podcast, Smaker stated, "I've been in contact with the guys throughout that entire time, I literally just got a message from one of them ... yesterday", making no mention of feeling in danger. She notes that it had been nine months since the public (and Saudi government) had had a chance to hear what the ex-prisoners had to say with film's premier. "I don't know if you know about the Saudi government, [but] if the Saudi government was going to do something" to punish the subjects/men who are allegedly in danger for speaking out, "they wouldn't have waited nine months".^{2:38:45}

Graeme Wood calls the claim that "the existence of this film" places the subjects of it in peril, "the most serious criticism of Smaker’s film", but also "the most mysterious", because all graduates of Saudi Arabia's terror-rehab program, are forbidden by Saudi Arabia (where they live) "from contact with former or current jihadists, including one another, and are not supposed to talk with foreigners or the media", (they were given special permission to talk to Smaker).

The mystery comes from the fact that for an ex-prisoner to make statements to The Guardian without permission would be to risk the punishment of the "violent dictatorship" they live in, but on the other hand, if they had been given permission, it would mean (as Wood put it), the Saudi government was un-gagging a subject of the film, just so the subject could reveal to the public "that the Saudi government might harm him if the film comes out."^{:2:34:01} According to Wood, the prisoners' statements about fear come via the Guantanamo prisoners' NGO CAGE. Wood asked CAGE and Stafford Smith (the lawyer for Guantanamo prisoners and critic of Smaker's film) "for proof that any of the men has claimed to be at risk. They did not reply."

In addition, the Saudi government has a number of contractual obligations with the US government in exchange for taking in the ex-prisoners, one of which is not to torture or kill them.^{2:39:17}

=== Fallout ===
Comments about the significance of the film's cancelation, disagree. Film critic Davide Abbatescianni writes that "hopefully, the turbulent distribution of this documentary [i.e. its cancelation] can teach everyone in the industry something valuable about curatorial strategies, the filming of sensitive subjects and unconscious bias".

Smaker, on the other hand, worries that if a film festival "as powerful as Sundance" could capitulate and apologize to a group that had not even seen the film they were attacking (when they started attacking it), "then eventually people are only going to program safe films which don't talk about the issues" that are hard to talk about and for which the independent film "space" is so well suited.

"If this space now has become infected with this … propensity to play it safe and avoid conflict, then there is no other space for it, there is no … plan C. This was the space where films got made and got platformed, and without that I'm very fearful of where my industry is headed."^{3:04:55}
