= Utah Office of Tourism =

The Utah Office of Tourism is a government agency which aims to increase tourism to the state of Utah. This increase would provide revenue to Utah, easing the burden on taxpayers.

== History ==
The Utah Office of Tourism has gone through many changes to become what it is today. Before a specific office for tourism existed, a variety of departments and offices were responsible for marketing Utah to potential visitors and businesses. Prior to 1967, tourism and publicity were under the direction of numerous departments, including the Department of Publicity and Industrial Development in 1941, the Road and Tourist Information Office in 1952, and the Utah Tourist and Publicity Council in 1953. The Utah Tourist Council handled most of the publicity for the state until the creation of the Division of Travel Development in 1967. As part of the Department of Development Services, this division increased direction while consolidating tourism and publicity goals.” In 1979, the Department of Development Services turned into the Department of Community and Economic Development, but its focus remained the same. The Utah Tourist Council established many of the features found in the current Office of Tourism, but operated on a much smaller scale than it does today. The Utah Office of Tourism, as it is known today, was finally created in 2005 by Governor Jon Huntsman as part of the new Utah Governor’s Office of Economic Development.

== Structure ==
As a part of the legislation that created UOT, the legislature formed a 13-member Board of Tourism Development, which is responsible for advising and directing the efforts of the office. This board is composed of individuals from across the tourism industry. They are appointed by the Governor and serve a four-year term. As an advisory board, they approve the marketing and branding efforts the office develops, and authorize spending and other activities.

== Funding & Budget ==
=== Funding ===
UOT’s funding comes from three main sources: the General Fund, the Tourism Marketing Performance Fund, and the Transportation Fund. The General Fund provides the base operations budget of UOT at over $4 million per year. The Tourism Marketing Performance Fund, on the other hand, is tied to UOT’s performance—the amount of money is derived from a formula that takes into account performance over the last four years based on “increases in sales tax revenue for 21 tourism related industries.” Finally, UOT also receives a small appropriation from the Transportation Fund to pay for UOT’s work with the welcome centers across the state.

=== Budget ===
UOT’s budget falls into four major categories:

==== Administration ====
Expenses under Administration are used mostly for salaries of personnel.

==== Operations and Fulfillment ====
Operation and Fulfillment funds are responsible for tourism information distribution, cooperation of other partners, and coordination of the scenic byway program and specialty projects.

==== Marketing and Advertising ====
Funds in Marketing and Advertising are spent on branding efforts, advertising, and promotional activities in the media and travel trade.

==== Film Commission ====
The Utah Film Commission (formerly the Utah Film Development Office) is a state-run film commission that markets the entire state as a destination for motion picture, television, and commercial industries. Formed in 1974, the commission is part of the Utah Governor’s Office of Economic Opportunity (GOED). The film commission acts as an individual entity under GOED but reports to the Managing Director of UOT.

==== Prior Year's Budgets ====
The following is a breakdown of UOT's operational budget from 2008-2012.

| Programs | 2008 | 2009 | 2010 | 2011 | 2012 |
|---|---|---|---|---|---|
| Administration | $989,700 | $1,031,800 | $986,700 | $950,300 | $988,200 |
| Operations and Fulfillment | $2,851,300 | $2,513,400 | $2,385,100 | $2,490,200 | $2,574,600 |
| Marketing and Advertising | $11,351,700 | $11,062,500 | $7,534,100 | $6,966,200 | $7,000,000 |
| Film Commission | $2,882,400 | $6,073,200 | $1,323,700 | $1,522,100 | $748,700 |
| Total | $18,075,100 | $20,680,900 | $12,229,600 | $11,928,800 | $11,311,500 |
