= Tonya Lewis Lee =

American attorney, producer and author (born 1966)

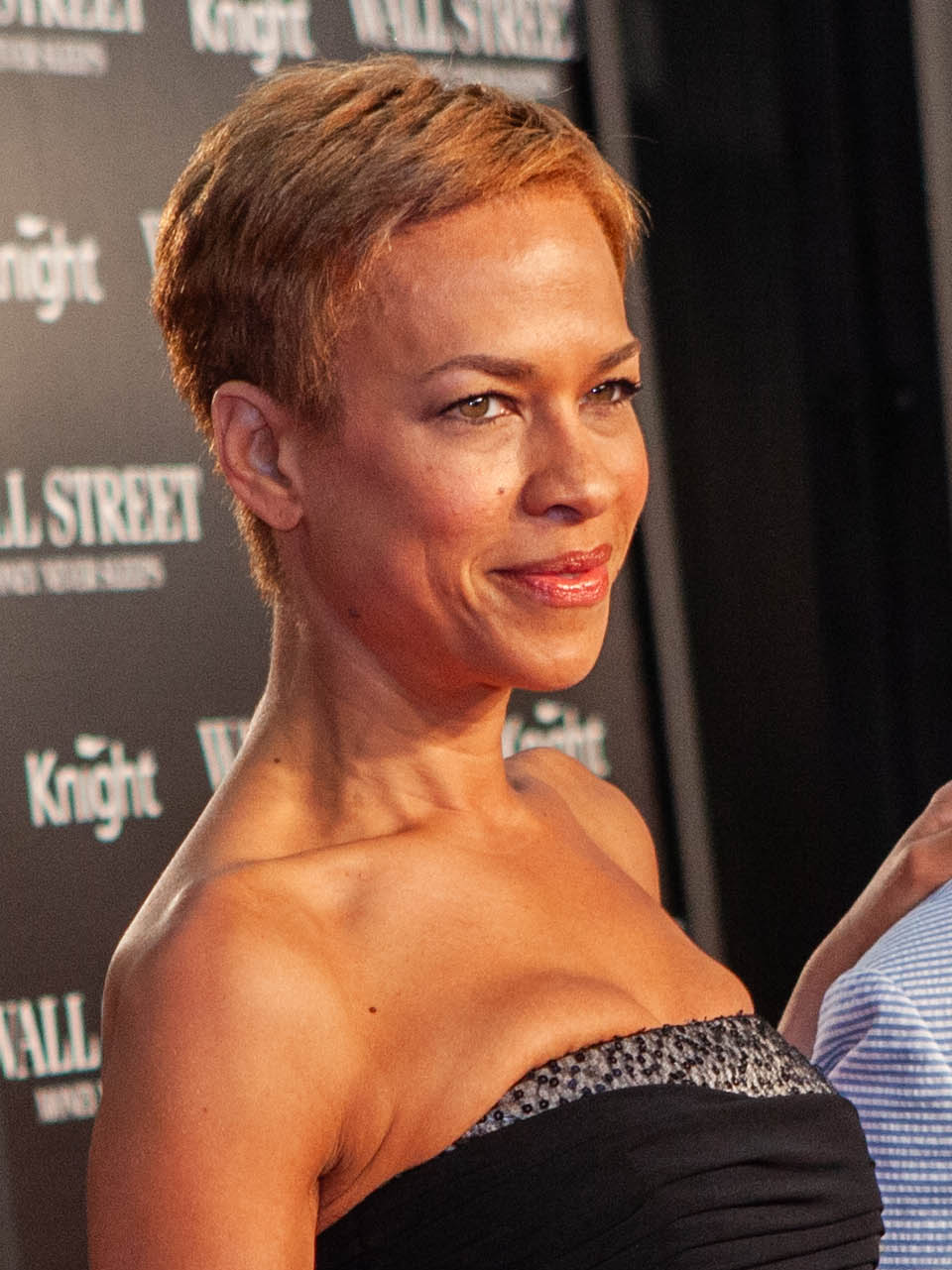
- Lewis Lee in 2010
- Born: Tonya Linnette Lewis; March 30, 1966 (age 60); Yonkers, New York, U.S.
- Education: Sarah Lawrence College (BA); University of Virginia School of Law (JD)
- Occupations: Attorney; filmmaker; author
- Spouse: Spike Lee (m. 1993)
- Children: 2

Tonya Linnette Lee (née Lewis; born March 30, 1966) is an American attorney, film and television producer, author, entrepreneur, and advocate for women and infant health. She founded her production company, Madstone Company Inc., in 1998, and has been involved in media for children, through her work with Nickelodeon and her authorship of children's books.

== Early life, education and personal life ==
Lewis Lee was born in Yonkers, New York, to Lillian Charlotte (née Glenn) and George Ralph Lewis. Her father held a corporate executive position at Philip Morris. She graduated from Sarah Lawrence College with a BA and the University of Virginia School of Law with a JD. After practicing law at Nixon, Hargrave, Devans & Doyle LLP in Washington, D.C. for nearly two years, she returned to New York and married Spike Lee in 1993. They have two children.

== Career ==
=== Film and television ===
Lewis Lee has been producing content for television and film for nearly 20 years. She began her career producing interstitial programming for Nickelodeon. She went on to produce larger projects for them, ultimately producing the miniseries Miracle’s Boys for the network along with the documentary, I Sit Where I Want, commemorating the 50th anniversary of the Brown v. Board of Education decision.

In 2014, Lewis Lee co-founded the production company ToniK Productions with Nikki Silver. Since its founding, ToniK has produced several projects including The Watsons Go To Birmingham, which Lewis Lee wrote, The Giver, She's Gotta Have It and MONSTER.

=== Writer ===
Lewis Lee is the author of three children's books, Please Baby Please, Please Puppy Please, and Giant Steps to Change the World. She is also the co-author of the New York Times bestselling Gotham Diaries and the writer of the script The Watsons Go to Birmingham.

=== Advocacy ===
Lewis Lee also served as the spokesperson for A Healthy Baby Begins With You an infant mortality awareness raising campaign out of the U.S. Department of Health and Human Services Office of Minority Health from 2007 to 2013. Through the campaign she traveled the US speaking on issues of women's health for the sake of their unborn children. She also produced the documentary film Crisis in the Crib: Saving Our Nation's Babies. Her work with this campaign inspired her to found Healthy You Now, a web platform for women's health.

In 2015, she founded Movita, an organic vitamin company that is sold through e-commerce.

== Filmography ==
=== Film ===
- The Watsons Go to Birmingham
- Monster (2018 film)
- Aftershock

=== Television series ===
- I Sit Where I Want: The Legacy of Brown v. the Board of Education
- Miracle's Boys
- That's What I'm Talking About
- Crisis in the Crib: Saving Our Nations Babies
- She's Gotta Have It

== Books ==
- Please Baby Please
- Please Puppy Please
- Giant Steps to Change the World
- Gotham Diaries

== Products ==
- Movita Organics
