= Brief But Spectacular =

Interview series

Brief But Spectacular is an interview series broadcast nationally in the U.S. as part of PBS NewsHour.

The series was created in 2015 by Steve Goldbloom, who has interviewed more than 500 guests for the program. Brief But Spectacular is produced and owned through Goldbloom's Los Angeles based production company, Second Peninsula. Each episode is approximately 2–4 minutes in length, featuring a subject's personal take on a defining theme.

While the show has profiled well-known figures like Ta-Nehisi Coates, Gloria Steinem, Steve Martin, Alec Baldwin, Carl Reiner, and Terry Gross, it has also featured lesser-known guests, such as Mahogany Browne, Clint Smith, and Flossie Lewis, whose take on growing old and living well generated more than 7 million views in two weeks. A special short documentary on Lewis received a 2019 Emmy nomination for Outstanding Feature Story in a newscast.

A ten-part Canadian version of Brief But Spectacular was distributed through CBC Digital channels beginning in January 2020.

== Format ==
Each episode has an interview subject(s) speaking about a topic that they feel is personally important. The interviews use quick-paced editing and are only a few minutes in length.

== Other media ==
PBS Learning has created lesson plans for teachers at various levels, linked to the common curriculum.

Artscanvas' focus on Utkarsh Ambudkar's take on avoiding ethnic stereotypes.

Salon interview with Mahogany L. Browne, Flossie Lewis, and Steve Goldbloom. Writer Daniel Handler, known as Lemony Snicket, said Flossie Lewis "has the ability to startle. She has no time for your bullshit."

Poets & Writers lists episodes featuring authors.

Inflection Point Radio with Lauren Schiller interviews Goldbloom, Browne and Lewis.

Commonwealth Media interviews Goldbloom, Browne and Lewis.
