= Gustav Hoegen =

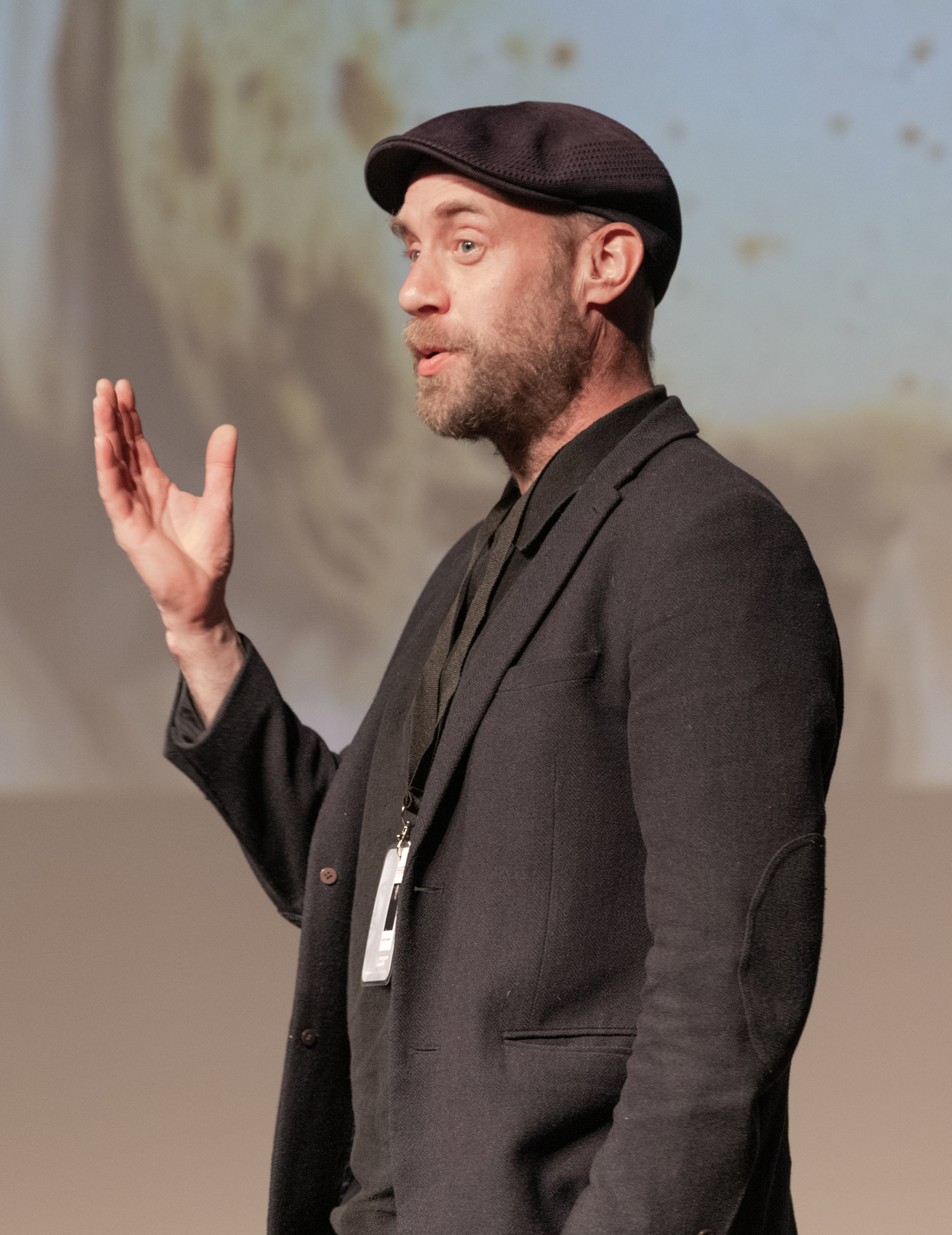
Gustav Hoegen (2022)

Gustav Hoegen is an animatronic designer/ creature FX artist.

== Early years ==
Hoegen grew up in the Netherlands and then moved to England when he was 19 where there was a thriving film industry so that he could be part of it. He studied at the Bournemouth Art Institute in the Design Modelmaking course. After two years in college, he was offered an apprenticeship at Artem.

== Career ==
Hoegen started his career as a model maker at a company called Artem. Today he is an animatronic designer and modeler for Pinewood Studios located near London, England.

== Movie projects ==
Hoegen has done animatronic designs on the following movies: Prometheus, Clash of the Titans, The Nutcracker in 3D, Inkheart, Doctor Who, Hatching, Isolation, The Brothers Grimm, Charlie and the Chocolate Factory, The Hitchhiker’s Guide to the Galaxy, This Little Life, A Shine of Rainbows, Doctor Who Confidential.
