= 2018 Sundance Film Festival =

Film festival in Utah, US

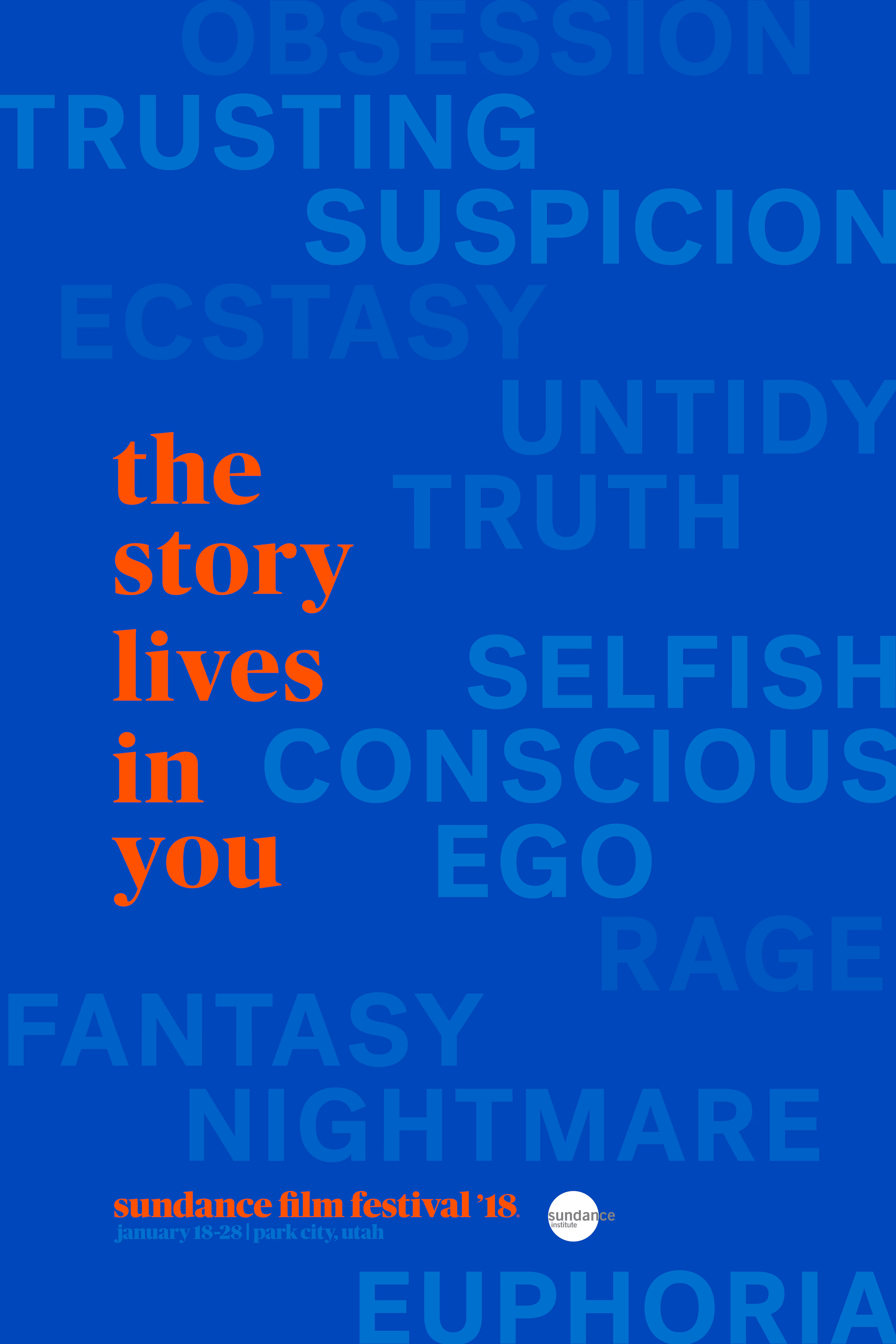
- Festival poster
- Location: Park City, Salt Lake City, Ogden, and Sundance, Utah
- Hosted by: Sundance Institute
- Festival date: January 18 to January 28, 2018
- Language: English
- Website: sundance.org/festival
- 2019 Sundance Film Festival 2017 Sundance Film Festival

The 2018 Sundance Film Festival took place from January 18 to January 28, 2018. The first lineup of competition films was announced on November 29, 2017. There was some degree of tension with this particular year's event, as Robert Redford addressed concerns about alleged assault accusations against Harvey Weinstein, and the event's organizers took measures to improve the safety of guests.

== Awards ==
The following awards were presented:

- U.S. Dramatic Grand Jury Prize Award: The Miseducation of Cameron Post, directed by Desiree Akhavan
- U.S. Dramatic Audience Award: Burden, directed by Andrew Heckler
- U.S. Dramatic Directing Award: The Kindergarten Teacher, directed by Sara Colangelo
- U.S. Dramatic Waldo Salt Screenwriting Award: Nancy, written by Christina Choe
- U.S. Dramatic Special Jury Award for Outstanding First Feature: Monsters and Men, directed by Reinaldo Marcus Green
- U.S. Dramatic Special Jury Award for Excellence in Filmmaking: I Think We're Alone Now, directed by Reed Morano
- U.S. Dramatic Special Jury Award for Achievement in Acting: Benjamin Dickey, Blaze
- U.S. Documentary Grand Jury Prize Award: Kailash (later released as The Price of Free), directed by Derek Doneen
- U.S. Documentary Audience Award: The Sentence, directed by Rudy Valdez
- U.S. Documentary Directing Award, On Her Shoulders, directed by Alexandria Bombach
- U.S. Documentary Special Jury Award for Social Impact: Crime + Punishment, directed by Stephen Maing
- U.S. Documentary Special Jury Award for Creative Vision: Hale County This Morning, This Evening, directed by RaMell Ross
- U.S. Documentary Special Jury Award for Breakthrough Filmmaking: Minding the Gap, directed by Bing Liu
- U.S. Documentary Special Jury Award for Storytelling: Three Identical Strangers, directed by Tim Wardle
- World Cinema Dramatic Grand Jury Prize: Butterflies, directed by Tolga Karacelik
- World Cinema Dramatic Audience Award: The Guilty, directed by Gustav Möller
- World Cinema Dramatic Directing Award: And Breathe Normally, directed by Ísold Uggadóttir
- World Cinema Dramatic Special Jury Award for Acting: Valeria Bertuccelli, The Queen of Fear
- World Cinema Dramatic Special Jury Award for Screenwriting: Time Share (Tiempo Compartido), written by Julio Chavezmontes and Sebastián Hofmann
- World Cinema Dramatic Special Jury Award for Ensemble Acting: Dead Pigs, directed by Cathy Yan
- World Cinema Documentary Grand Jury Prize: Of Fathers and Sons, directed by Talal Derki
- World Cinema Documentary Audience Award: This is Home, directed by Alexandra Shiva
- World Cinema Documentary Directing Award: Shirkers, directed by Sandi Tan
- World Cinema Documentary Special Jury Award: Matangi/Maya/M.I.A., presented to director Stephen Loveridge and M.I.A.
- World Cinema Documentary Special Jury Award for Cinematography: Genesis 2.0, Peter Indergand and Maxim Arbugaev
- World Cinema Documentary Special Jury Award for Editing: Our New President, Maxim Pozdorovkin and Matvey Kulakov
- NEXT Audience Award: Searching, directed by Aneesh Chaganty
- NEXT Innovator Award: (tie) Night Comes On, directed by Jordana Spiro; We the Animals, directed by Jeremiah Zagar
- Short Film Grand Jury Prize: Matria, directed by Alvaro Gago
- Short Film Jury Award: U.S. Fiction: Hair Wolf, directed by Mariama Diallo
- Short Film Jury Award: International Fiction: Would You Look at Her, directed by Goran Stolevski
- Short Film Jury Award: Nonfiction: The Trader (Sovdagari), directed by Tamta Gabrichidze
- Short Film Jury Award: Animation: Glucose, directed by Jeron Braxton
- Special Jury Awards: Emergency, directed by Carey Williams; Fauve, directed by Jérémy Comte; and For Nonna Anna, directed by Luis De Filippis
- Sundance Institute Open Borders Fellowship Presented by Netflix: Of Fathers and Sons (Syria), directed by Talal Derki; Untitled film (India), directed by Chaitanya Tamhane; and Night on Fire, directed by Tatiana Huezo
- Sundance Institute / NHK Award: His House, directed by Remi Weekes
- Sundance Institute Alfred P. Sloan Feature Film Prize: Searching, Aneesh Chaganty and Sev Ohanian
- Sundance Institute / Amazon Studios Producers Award: Sev Ohanian

== Films ==
=== U.S. Dramatic Competition ===
Film	Director
American Animals	Bart Layton
Blaze	Ethan Hawke
Blindspotting	Carlos López Estrada
Burden	Andrew Heckler
Eighth Grade	Bo Burnham
I Think We're Alone Now	Reed Morano
The Kindergarten Teacher	Sara Colangelo
Lizzie	Craig William Macneill
The Miseducation of Cameron Post	Desiree Akhavan
Monster	Anthony Mandler
Monsters and Men	Reinaldo Marcus Green
Nancy	Christina Choe
Sorry to Bother You	Boots Riley
The Tale	Jennifer Fox
Tyrel	Sebastián Silva
Wildlife	Paul Dano

=== U.S. Documentary Competition ===
Film	Director
Bisbee '17	Robert Greene
Crime + Punishment	Stephen Maing
Dark Money	Kimberly Reed
The Devil We Know	Stephanie Soechtig
Hal	Amy Scott
Hale County This Morning, This Evening	RaMell Ross
Inventing Tomorrow	Laura Nix
Kailash	Derek Doneen
Kusama: Infinity	Heather Lenz
The Last Race	Michael Dweck
Minding the Gap	Bing Liu
On Her Shoulders	Alexandria Bombach
The Price of Everything	Nathaniel Kahn
Seeing Allred	Sophie Sartain and Roberta Grossman
The Sentence	Rudy Valdez
Three Identical Strangers	Tim Wardle

=== Premieres ===
- Beirut by Brad Anderson
- The Catcher Was a Spy by Ben Lewin
- Colette by Wash Westmoreland
- Come Sunday by Joshua Marston
- Damsel by David Zellner
- Don't Worry, He Won't Get Far on Foot by Gus Van Sant
- A Futile and Stupid Gesture by David Wain
- The Happy Prince by Rupert Everett
- Hearts Beat Loud by Brett Haley
- Juliet, Naked by Jesse Peretz
- A Kid Like Jake by Silas Howard
- Leave No Trace by Debra Granik
- The Long Dumb Road by Hannah Fidell
- Ophelia by Claire McCarthy
- Private Life by Tamara Jenkins
- Puzzle by Marc Turtletaub
- Tully by Jason Reitman
- What They Had by Elizabeth Chomko

=== Documentary Premieres ===
- Akicita: The Battle of Standing Rock by Cody Lucich
- Bad Reputation by Kevin Kerslake
- Believer by Don Argott
- Chef Flynn by Cameron Yates
- The Game Changers by Louie Psihoyos
- Generation Wealth by Lauren Greenfield
- Half the Picture by Amy Adrion
- Jane Fonda in Five Acts by Susan Lacy
- King in the Wilderness by Peter Kunhardt
- Quiet Heroes by Jenny Mackenzie
- RBG by Betsy West and Julie Cohen
- Robin Williams: Come Inside My Mind by Marina Zenovich
- Studio 54 by Matt Tyrnauer
- Won't You Be My Neighbor? by Morgan Neville

=== Midnight ===
- Arizona by Jonathan Watson
- Assassination Nation by Sam Levinson
- Hereditary by Ari Aster
- Lords of Chaos by Jonas Åkerlund
- Mandy by Panos Cosmatos
- Never Goin' Back by Augustine Frizzell
- Piercing by Nicolas Pesce
- Revenge by Coralie Fargeat
- Summer of 84 by RKSS

=== World Cinema Dramatic Competition ===
- And Breathe Normally by Ísold Uggadóttir (Iceland-Sweden-Belgium)
- Butterflies by Tolga Karaçelik (Turkey)
- Dead Pigs by Cathy Yan (China)
- The Guilty by Gustav Möller (Denmark)
- Holiday by Isabella Eklöf (Denmark-Netherlands-Sweden)
- Loveling by Gustavo Pizzi (Brazil-Uruguay)
- Pity by Babis Makridis (Greece-Poland)
- The Queen of Fear by Valeria Bertuccelli and Fabiana Tiscornia (Argentina-Denmark)
- Rust by Aly Muritiba (Brazil)
- Time Share (Tiempo Compartido) by Sebastián Hofmann (Mexico-Netherlands)
- Un Traductor by Rodrigo Barriuso and Sebastián Barriuso (Canada-Cuba)
- Yardie by Idris Elba (U.K.)

=== World Cinema Documentary Competition ===
- Anote's Ark by Matthieu Rytz (Canada)
- The Cleaners by Moritz Riesewieck and Hans Block (Germany/Brazil)
- Genesis 2.0 by Christian Frei and Maxim Arbugaev (Switzerland)
- Matangi/Maya/M.I.A. by Stephen Loveridge (Sri Lanka/United Kingdom/United States)
- Of Fathers and Sons by Talal Derki (Germany/Syria/Lebanon/Qatar)
- The Oslo Diaries by Mor Loushy and Daniel Sivan (Israel/Canada)
- Our New President by Maxim Pozdorovkin (Russia/United States)
- A Polar Year by Samuel Collardey (France)
- Shirkers by Sandi Tan (United States)
- This Is Home by Alexandra Shiva (Jordan/United States)
- Westwood: Punk, Icon, Activist by Lorna Tucker (United Kingdom)
- A Woman Captured by Bernadett Tuza-Ritter (Hungary)

=== Special Events ===
- The King by Eugene Jarecki
- Pass Over by Spike Lee
- The Trade by Matthew Heineman
- Wild Wild Country by Chapman Way and Maclain Way

== Juries ==
Jury members, for each program of the festival, including the Alfred P. Sloan Jury were announced on January 16, 2018.

U.S. Documentary Jury

- Barbara Chai
- Simon Chinn
- Chaz Ebert
- Ezra Edelman
- Matt Holzman

U.S. Dramatic Jury

- Rachel Morrison
- Jada Pinkett Smith
- Octavia Spencer
- Michael Stuhlbarg
- Joe Swanberg

World Documentary Jury

- Hanaa Issa
- Ruben Östlund
- Michael J. Werner

World Dramatic Jury

- Joslyn Barnes
- Billy Luther
- Paulina Suárez

Alfred P. Sloan Jury

- Robert Benezra
- Heather Berlin
- Kerry Bishé
- Nancy Buirski

NEXT Jury

- RuPaul Charles

Short Film Jury

- Cherien Dabis
- Shirley Manson
- Chris Ware

== See also ==
- Sundance Film Festival
