= Ferrugem =

Ferrugem means "rust" in Portuguese. It is also a common nickname and may refer to:

- Ferrugem (footballer, born 1988) (Weverton Almeida Santos), a Brazilian right-back and midfielder footballer
- Ferrugem (footballer, born 1992) (Anderson Moreira da Silva), a Brazilian right-back footballer
- Rodrigo (footballer, born October 1980), a Brazilian former midfielder footballer, also nicknamed Ferrugem
- Ferrugem (singer) (born 1988), a Brazilian singer and composer

== Other uses ==
- Rust (2018 film), a 2018 Brazilian film, originally titled Ferrugem
