= Piano (company) =

Film production and distribution company based in Mexico City

PIANO
- Company type: Private
- Industry: Entertainment
- Founded: September 2011
- Founder: Julio Chavezmontes, Sebastián Hofmann
- Headquarters: Mexico City
- Area served: Worldwide
- Key people: Julio Chavezmontes (CEO, Producer) Sebastián Hofmann (Partner, Creative Director); Carolina Pérez Costamagna (COO); Mónica Moreno (Head of Production); Ester Bernal (Head of Distribution); Lawrence Davin (Partner, Head of Financing) Linda Díaz (Head of TV)
- Services: Film Production, Film Distribution, Finance, International Coproductions
- Website: http://somospiano.com

Piano is an independent film production and distribution company based in Mexico City, started in 2011 by Julio Chavezmontes and Sebastián Hofmann as a platform for innovative filmmakers. It specializes in film production, finance, distribution, and international coproductions.

“Halley”, the company’s first feature project, premiered internationally at the 2013 Sundance Film Festival. Since then, Piano has produced ten films, which have collectively premiered at over 100 international film festivals – including official selections at Sundance, Berlin, Rotterdam, Locarno and Toronto – and have received multiple awards and nominations in Mexico and abroad.

Notable past coproducers include Carlos Reygadas, Jaime Romandía, Alejandro González Iñárritu, Lisa Cortes, Yann Gonzalez, Michael Fitzgerald, Stienette Bosklopper, Moises Cosio, and Ginevra Elkann.

== History ==
=== Founding and early years ===
Piano was established in 2011 to produce the screenplay for “Halley”, written by Julio Chavezmontes and Sebastián Hofmann. The film was directed by Hofmann and produced by Chavezmontes, in partnership with Mantarraya Producciones, responsible for launching the careers of celebrated Mexican directors Carlos Reygadas and Amat Escalante. The film received the support of the Mexican Film Institute and the Hubert Bals Fund during post-production.

In January 2013, “Halley” premiered at the New Frontier Section of the Sundance Film Festival, where the Sundance / AMC Channel acquired it for release. Following its Sundance premiere, “Halley” was invited to over 50 international film festivals, including the prestigious Hivos Tiger Awards Competition of the IFF Rotterdam, the Munich Film Festival, Karlovy Vary Film Festival, Fantastic Fest, Fantasia Film Festival, the Sitges Film Festival, and Puchon International Fantastic Film Festival among others.

Overall, “Halley” won 8 awards, including the Sitges New Visions Award, the Cinevision Award at Munich, the AQCC Award and the Special Jury Mention at Fantasia Film Festival. In Mexico, the film was nominated to five Ariel Awards, winning the prize for Best Make Up.

=== 2013 – present: Notable Productions ===
Since the release of “Halley”, Piano has produced ten films, with notable productions including Nicolas Echevarría’s “Echo of the Mountain” and Emiliano Rocha Minter’s debut “We Are the Flesh ”. Echo of the Mountain won six international awards, such as the Gold Hugo at the Docufest Competition in the Chicago International Film Festival, and received five nominations, including Best Documentary and Best Music at the Mexican Academy Awards.

We Are the Flesh was praised and supported upon release by directors Alejandro González Iñárritu, Carlos Reygadas and Alfonso Cuarón. The film was shown at multiple film festivals, including the IFF Rotterdam, and the Cannes Film Festival’s Blood Window Galas. Upon commercial release in the United States, the film was praised by The Village Voice, Slant Magazine, Los Angeles Times, and the SF Weekly among others.

=== 2014 – present: Distribution ===
In 2014, Piano partnered with Andrea Castex to launch distribution operations in Mexico, with a focus on author-driven cinema. Since then, the company has released Inori, Death in Arizona, Sand Dollars, The dead, Tropical Carmin, All of Me, Eisenstein in Guanajuato, The Pleasure is mine, Epitaph, We Are the Flesh, and The Darkness. In 2017, Piano announced an expansion of its acquisition strategy to foreign titles with the purchases of the 2017 Palme d'Or winner The Square, and Rungano Nyoni's feature film debut I'm not a Witch. Piano also launched for sale a DVD and Blu-ray collection of auteur cinema that includes so far three editions of Mexican cult movies (Halley, Alamar-Inori and Duck Season), meticulously designed to offer a collection product to its public.

== Filmography ==
- Ismael (2012)
- Halley (2012)
- Kwaku Ananse (2013)
- Death in Arizona (2014)
- Echo of the Mountain (2014)
- We Are the Flesh (2016)
- Resurrection (2016)
- The Gaze of the Sea (2017)
- Opus Zero (2017)
- Acusada (2018)
- Knife + Heart (2018)
- Time Share (2018)
- Land (2018)
- Memoria (2021)
