= Dancing for the Devil =

2024 American documentary film

- Genre: Documentary
- Directed by: Derek Doneen
- Country of origin: United States
- Original languages: English; Korean
- No. of episodes: 3

Production
- Producer: Jessica Acevedo

Original release
- Network: Netflix
- Release: May 29, 2024

Dancing for the Devil: The 7M TikTok Cult is a 2024 American documentary series directed by Derek Doneen about cult allegations against the talent management company 7M Films. The film covers the history of 7M Films and founder Robert Israel Shinn and allegations against both of abusive behavior and financial exploitation.

The series focuses on allegations made by multiple former clients of 7M and members of Shinn's Shekinah Church, an organization established in 1994 with ties to 7M through Shinn. These include accusations of physical and sexual abuse as well as allegations that 7M and the Shekinah Church took up to 80% of clients' gross pay via a variety of fees and required donations to the church. The series also covers the life of Miranda Derrick, previously known as Miranda Wilking, a TikTok dancer and one half of the Wilking Sisters duo. Miranda gained several million followers making videos alongside her sister before being recruited by 7M and joining the Shekinah Church. Derrick's sister and parents allege that she has been isolated from their family along with other dancers recruited by 7M.

7M Films has denied the allegations raised in the documentary. Derrick released a statement on the documentary in an Instagram story, characterizing the allegations as part of a family dispute over control of her and her sister's shared TikTok account and stating that ongoing litigation in which she was the plaintiff prevented her from making further comments. Shinn and other members of 7M declined to be interviewed for the documentary.

Filming began at the end of 2022, and the three-episode series was released on Netflix on May 29, 2024.

== See also ==
- Seven Mountain Mandate
