= Memoria (2021 film) =

2021 film by Apichatpong Weerasethakul

- Theatrical release poster
- Directed by: Apichatpong Weerasethakul
- Written by: Apichatpong Weerasethakul
- Produced by: Apichatpong Weerasethakul; Diana Bustamante; Simon Field; Keith Griffiths; Charles de Meaux; Michael Weber; Julio Chavezmontes
- Starring: Tilda Swinton; Elkin Díaz; Jeanne Balibar; Juan Pablo Urrego; Daniel Giménez Cacho
- Cinematography: Sayombhu Mukdeeprom
- Edited by: Lee Chatametikool
- Music by: César López
- Production companies: Kick the Machine; Burning; Illuminations Films (Past Lives); Anna Sanders Films; Match Factory Productions; Piano; Xstream Pictures; iQIYI Pictures; Titan Creative Entertainment; Rediance; ZDF/Arte; Louverture Films; Doha Film Institute; Beijing Contemporary Art Foundation; Bord Cadre Films; Sovereign Films; Field of Vision; 185 Films
- Distributed by: Cineplex (Colombia); Sovereign Films (United Kingdom); New Story (France); Mubi; Port-au-Prince Pictures (Germany); Common Move (Thailand); Huaxia Film Distribution (China); iFilm (Taiwan); Neon (United States); Piano (Mexico); Cinémathèque suisse (Switzerland)
- Release dates: 15 July 2021 (Cannes); 30 September 2021 (Colombia); 17 November 2021 (France); 26 December 2021 (United States); 14 January 2022 (United Kingdom)
- Running time: 136 minutes
- Countries: Thailand; Colombia; United Kingdom; France; Germany; Mexico; China; Taiwan; United States; Switzerland
- Languages: English; Spanish
- Box office: $588,713

Memoria (stylized as məmorᴉa) is a 2021 drama mystery film written, directed and co-produced by Apichatpong Weerasethakul, starring Tilda Swinton, Elkin Díaz, Jeanne Balibar, Juan Pablo Urrego and Daniel Giménez Cacho. It is a notable entry into the modern slow cinema genre.

The film had its world premiere at the Cannes Film Festival on 15 July 2021, and was given a very limited theatrical release in the United States from 26 December 2021. It was selected as the Colombian entry for the Best International Feature Film at the 94th Academy Awards, though it was not nominated.

== Plot ==
Jessica, a Scottish expatriate to Colombia, awakens one night to a single loud boom. She appears to be the only one who heard it. The next day, she goes to visit her sister, Karen, who is ill and in a hospital in Bogotá. Jessica operates a market-flower business in Medellín, and is curious to learn more about an excavation project being carried out in the same hospital where her sister is being treated.

Still bothered by the sound, which she hears repeatedly and which prevents her from sleeping, Jessica seeks the help of a young sound engineer named Hernán to recreate the sound. Though unsuccessful at first, the two eventually approximate the sound, and begin a friendly relationship. Right before they are to take a trip together, Jessica looks for Hernán at his sound engineering studio, only to discover that he is not there and no one working there knows who he is.

Finding herself growing increasingly uncomfortable while in the company of her now-healthy sister, Jessica ventures out into the countryside alone, where she encounters a middle-aged fish scaler, also named Hernán. This Hernán lives a secluded life, but he speaks frankly with Jessica. They discuss his connection to the earth, his sleep, and their memories. Inside his home, Jessica learns to connect with her memories in a similar fashion to Hernán, and at one point while holding hands, appears to have her memories intertwine with his.

Jessica then approaches an open window and hears the booming sound again, but seems to have grown to accept it and even appreciate it. Suddenly, a camouflaged alien spacecraft rises out of the jungle, leaving a loud sonic boom in its wake. A radio broadcast is heard reporting a mild earthquake that, unbeknownst to the general population, coincided with the take-off of the spacecraft. The broadcast goes on to say that the quake has unearthed previously inaccessible areas that the aforementioned excavation project was searching for.

== Cast ==
- Tilda Swinton as Jessica Holland
- Elkin Díaz as older Hernán Bedoya
- Jeanne Balibar as Agnes Cerkinsky
- Juan Pablo Urrego as younger Hernán Bedoya
- Daniel Giménez Cacho as Juan Ospina
- Agnes Brekke as Karen Holland
- Jerónimo Barón as Mateo Ospina
- Constanza Gutiérrez as Dr. Constanza

== Production ==
On MUBI Podcast in 2023, Swinton mentioned that her and Weerasethakul conjured the idea for Memoria over ten years previously. Weerasethakul also mentioned he had begun the script for the film back in 2013.

In March 2018, it was announced Tilda Swinton had joined the cast of the film, with Apichatpong Weerasethakul directing from the screenplay he wrote. In August 2019, Jeanne Balibar, Daniel Giménez Cacho, Juan Pablo Urrego, and Elkin Diaz joined the cast of the film.

Principal photography began in August 2019, in Colombia.

== Release ==
The film premiered at the 74th Cannes Film Festival on 15 July 2021, and was awarded the Jury Prize.

Neon acquired US distribution rights in November 2019, and announced a "never-ending" release in the United States, in which it would be "moving from city to city, theater to theater, week by week, playing in front of only one solitary audience at any given time", beginning on 26 December 2021 at New York's IFC Center. Neon later adopted a new release strategy in the US, announcing a simultaneous release that would play in front of many audiences in multiple cities beginning 1 April 2022, with more locations across the US as well as in Canada.

The film was widely released by co-producer and distributor Sovereign Films in the United Kingdom and Ireland on 14 January 2022. Unlike the US theatrical release, the film was released as a regular theatrical release with simultaneous screenings in many cinemas across the UK.

The film was screened at a special screening at the Australian Centre for the Moving Image in Melbourne on 9 December 2021, and went on general release in Australian cinemas on 9 April 2022, distributed by Madman Entertainment.

Common Move acquired Thai distribution rights to the film and released it to cinemas across Thailand on 3 March.

== Reception ==
=== Box office ===
The film was initially released in one movie theatre in the United States and Canada. It made $6,797 in its opening weekend and $18,122 in its second.

=== Critical response ===
Memoria received critical acclaim. On review aggregator website Rotten Tomatoes it has a 90% score from 139 reviews, with an average rating of 8.1/10. The consensus states: "Memoria finds writer-director Apichatpong Weerasethakul branching out into English-language filmmaking without forsaking any of his own lyrical cinematic vocabulary". On Metacritic, it has a score of 92, based on 34 reviews, indicating "universal acclaim". Film critic Jonathan Rosenbaum placed the film on his "Best Films of 2022" list. In June 2025, IndieWire ranked the film at number 11 on its list of "The 100 Best Movies of the 2020s (So Far)."

=== Accolades ===
Year	Award	Category	Recipient(s)	Result	Ref.
2021	74th Cannes Film Festival	Jury Prize	Memoria	Won	
2021	Chicago International Film Festival	Gold Hugo	Memoria	Won	
2021	London Film Critics Circle Awards 2021	Film of the Year	Memoria	Nominated	

== See also ==
- List of submissions to the 94th Academy Awards for Best International Feature Film
- List of Colombian submissions for the Academy Award for Best International Feature Film
