= Wilking Sisters =

American social media duo

The Wilking Sisters is an American social media duo brand consisting of sisters Miranda and Melanie Wilking. The sisters were featured in the Netflix docu-series Dancing for the Devil: The 7M TikTok Cult. Having danced together since they were young, they performed choreography together for millions of followers since early 2020 until a fallout with 7M Films, wherein Miranda was reportedly abducted by the cult-like company.

Miranda Wilking is an American social media personality. She received widespread media coverage for being a victim of 7M Films, an alleged religious cult. Wilking was the main subject of the Netflix docu-series Dancing for the Devil: The 7M TikTok Cult.

== See also ==
- Seven Mountain Mandate
