= Heist (2021 TV series) =

2021 true crime docudrama

- Promotional poster
- Genre: Docu-series
- Directed by: Derek Doneen; Nick Frew; Martin Desmond Roe
- Starring: Lisa Lord; William Guirola; Emree Franklin; Kate Watson; GeorgeAnne Carden
- Composer: Jordan Gagne
- Country of origin: United States
- Original language: English
- No. of seasons: 1
- No. of episodes: 6

Production
- Producers: Sarah Anthony; Maria Bukhonina; Lindsey Savino
- Cinematography: Adam Stone
- Running time: 41-49 mins
- Production company: Dirty Robber

Original release
- Network: Netflix
- Release: July 14, 2021

Heist is a 2021 American Netflix true crime documentary series that follows the story of three heists, each told through first-hand interviews and reenactments by the people who performed them. The series was released on July 14, 2021.

== Reception ==
The series received an 88% approval rating on the review aggregator site Rotten Tomatoes.

== Cast and characters ==
=== Sex Magick Money Murder: Part 1 and Part 2 ===
"Heather Tallchief gives in to hypnosis and aids career criminal Roberto Solis in a plot to steal $3.1 million from an armored truck in Las Vegas."

- Emree Franklin as Young Heather Tallchief
- Lisa Lord as Heather Tallchief
- Patricio Doren as Roberto Solis
- GeorgeAnne Carden as Marlene

=== The Bourbon King Part 1 and Part 2 ===
The "Bourbon King" portion of the series that tells the story of the Pappy Van Winkle heist in Kentucky. It features the actual real life, key characters including Toby Curtsinger, Sheriff Pat Melton, and Bourbon journalist and expert Tom Fischer.
