= Sebastián Hofmann =

Mexican visual artist and filmmaker (born 1981)

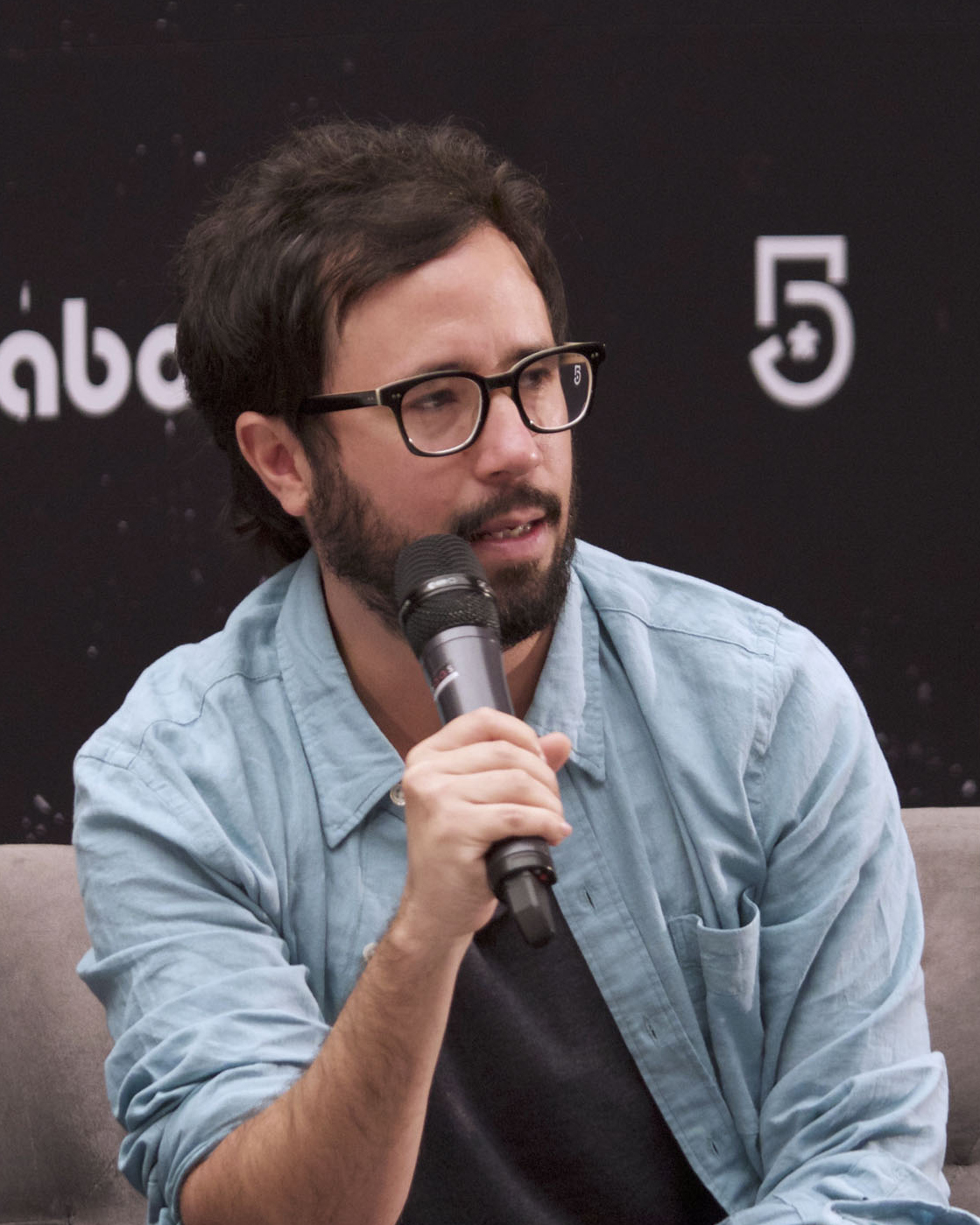
- Born: January 1, 1981; Mexico City, Mexico
- Education: Art Center College of Design
- Occupations: Film director, Cinematographer

Sebastián Hofmann (born 1981) is a Mexican visual artist and filmmaker whose productions have been presented in the film festivals of Cannes, Rotterdam, Locarno, Sundance, San Sebastian, among others. He is also the co-founder of the prestigious production and distribution company Piano.

His work as a visual artist has been presented in galleries and museums in New York, Sidney, Rio de Janeiro, Athens, Berlin, Santiago, Pasadena, Mexico City and Prague.

== Career ==
Sebastián Hofmann has a B.F.A. with honors from the Art Center College of Design in Pasadena, California. In 2010 he shot his first short film, Jaime Tapones, the main topic of which inspired his first feature film, Halley.

In 2011, Hofmann and Julio Chavezmontes founded Piano in Mexico City as a creative studio for developing original and challenging artistic projects. With Piano, they wrote and produced Halley which was selected in more than 50 international film festivals after its premiere at the New Frontier Section of the Sundance Film Festival in 2013, where the Sundance / AMC Channel acquired it for release. "Halley" was well received and won several awards, including the Sitges New Visions Award, the Cinevision Award (Best Film By An Emerging Director) at the Munich Film Festival, the AQCC Award and the Special Jury Mention at Fantasia Film Festival and Best Film Award at the East End Film Festival. In Mexico, the film had five nominations at the Ariel Awards, such as Best First Work for Hofmann, winning the prize for Best Make Up.

His second feature-length movie is Time Share (Tiempo Compartido) (2018), which Hofmann co-wrote with Julio Chavezmontes. The cast includes Luis Gerardo Méndez, Miguel Rodarte, Cassandra Ciangherottti and R.J. Mitte, of the popular TV Breaking Bad. Time Share had its world debut at the 2018 Sundance Film Festival, where it was awarded with the World Cinema Dramatic Special Jury Award for Screenwriting. Unlike Halley, the film received mixed reviews due its slow pacing and lack of storytelling. Time Share was distributed in Mexico in summer 2018. It has been distributed internationally through the Netflix streaming digital platform.

Besides his work as a director and co-producer, Sebastián Hofmann has also worked as a cinematographer in documentaries such as Nicolas Echevarría’s Echo of the Mountain, screened at the Berlinale and winner at the Chicago International Film Festival 2014, The Gaze of the Sea and Canícula. In this last one he also worked as co-writer and editor. Canícula won the FIPRESCI Award for Best Film at the Thessaloniki Documentary Festival and was later acquired by Discovery Channel.

Hofmann is also the creator and star of Los Micro Burgueses, an independent absurd comedy web series of social critic, presented at the IFFR in 2012.

== Filmography ==
- Halley (2013)
- Time Share (Tiempo Compartido) (2018)
- Time Share (Plugs) (2011)
