= Resurrection (2016 Mexican film) =

- Directed by: Eugenio Polgovsky
- Written by: Eugenio Polgovsky
- Produced by: Eugenio Polgovsky, Julio Chavezmontes
- Cinematography: Eugenio Polgovsky
- Edited by: Eugenio Polgovsky
- Production companies: PIANO, Tecolote Films
- Release date: July 2016
- Running time: 93 minutes
- Country: Mexico
- Language: Spanish

Resurrection is a 2016 documentary film by Eugenio Polgovsky about the extremely polluted environment around the waterfall of El Salto de Juanacatlán, in Mexico.

== Synopsis ==
The place that used to be known as the "Mexican Niagara", a natural paradise shaped by the Santiago river and the waterfall of "El Salto de Juanacatlán" is now a poisonous place for the community that lives in its bank. With the establishment of an industrial corridor near the city of Guadalajara in the 70's, the waters became toxic and destructive. Today the Santiago river is one of the most polluted ones in Mexico. While authorities keep ignoring the problem and locals are dying silently and suffering from diseases like cancer, chronic kidney disease, skin diseases and infections among other health problems, Polgovsky focuses on a local family that fights to survive in the ruins of their town.

== Release ==
Resurrection had its international premiere at the 33rd edition of FIFE (Paris International Environmental Film Festival) where it won the Special Jury Award. In Mexico, the film was screened in the Guanajuato International Film Festival and the Morelia International Film Festival where it received the Ambulante Special Award in the Mexican Feature-Length Documentary section.
