= Time Share (2018 film) =

2018 Mexican thriller-drama film by Sebastián Hofmann

- Film poster
- Directed by: Sebastián Hofmann
- Written by: Sebastián Hofmann
- Produced by: Julio Chavezmontes
- Starring: Luis Gerardo Méndez; Miguel Rodarte; Cassandra Ciangherotti; Monserrat Maranon; RJ Mitte; Andres Almeida
- Cinematography: Matias Penachino
- Edited by: Sebastián Hofmann
- Music by: Giorgio Giampà
- Production companies: Piano; Circle Films
- Distributed by: Netflix
- Release dates: 20 January 2018 (Sundance); 31 August 2018 (Mexico)
- Running time: 96 minutes
- Country: Mexico
- Language: Spanish

Time Share (Spanish: Tiempo Compartido) is a 2018 Mexican thriller-drama film directed by Sebastián Hofmann, and written by Hofmann and Julio Chavezmontes. The film follows the stories of two haunted family men: Andres (Miguel Rodarte), a cleaning man working in a luxury resort; and Pedro (Luis Gerardo Méndez), spending a week-long holiday in the same resort with his wife and son.

== Plot ==
Pedro, his wife Eva, and their young son arrive at the Everfield luxury resort for a week long holiday. That evening, another family knocks at their door, claiming the right to stay in their same bungalow. The management of Everfield has overbooked the bungalows. Pedro is not particularly fond of the gregarious manners of the other father Abel. To Pedro's dismay, the two families are forced to share the same bungalow. Things become increasingly bizarre as Pedro begins to feel that the family he is sharing his entire holidays with may not be as nice as it looks.

Meanwhile, deeply troubled Andres is trying to save his relationship with his wife Gloria. Once a cheerful and athletic village entertainer at Everfield, Andres fell into a spiral of depression after the death of his son. For this reason, he now works as a cleaning man for the same resort. Although his wife also works as a cleaner at Everfield, she is chosen among the other members of the staff for a special development scheme which may lead her to future promotions and a pay raise. The development scheme is co-ordinated by the mysterious and sinister American manager Tom.

Things will become darker and stranger, until Pedro's and Andres' paths will cross.

== Cast ==
- Luis Gerardo Méndez as Pedro
- Cassandra Ciangherotti as Eva
- Miguel Rodarte as Andres
- Montserrat Maranon as Gloria
- RJ Mitte as Tom
- Andres Almeida as Abel

== Release ==
The film premiered at the World Cinema Dramatic Competition section at the 2018 Sundance Film Festival. It was released theatrically in Mexico on 31 August 2018. It was released internationally by Netflix on November 30, 2018.

== Reception ==
Time Share received positive reviews from critics. On review aggregator Rotten Tomatoes, the film holds an approval rating of 86% based on 22 reviews, with an average rating of 7.6/10. The site's critical consensus reads: "Sharp, funny, and delightfully dark, Time Share (Tiempo Compartido) offers genre fans a complex thriller that sinks its hooks in fast and doesn't let go until the closing credits."

Writing for The Hollywood Reporter, Franck Scheck praises the cinematography and the eerie soundtrack, as well as the "disturbing prologue", although he feels that the film "never achieves dramatic urgency. The characters feel more like plot devices than three-dimensional figures, the storylines don't converge in sufficiently resonant fashion and the pacing is sluggish to the point of tedium. The film seems to be constantly straining for a deep significance that it never quite pulls off".

Nick Allen of RogerEbert.com also laments the pace of the movie and finds the resolution of the story unsatisfying. He defines the movie as "a horror movie with the third act taken out". Nevertheless, he praises the cast and the cinematography, adding that "The movie peddles in paranoia, but is too tedious to make a lasting effect; even the resort itself seems too poorly operated to be worried about. This steady decline is all the more disappointing because of the solid filmmaking and acting, of which there are inspired moments throughout".

Guy Lodge, for Variety, defines Time Share as "[a] nasty, nettling little puzzle piece that cleverly probes patriarchal insecurity and corporate invasiveness through the course of one botched family vacation". He also praises the cinematography, commenting that "[this] is the kind of film that can turn pools of blush-pink to blood-red in a single shot, and a trick of either the light or mind is responsible".

On a more positive note, Danielle Solzman, for Cultured Vultures, comments "[w]ith you never knowing exactly what will happen next, Time Share is going to keep audiences on the edge of their seat. Allan Hunter, for Screen Daily, observes that the movie is ″Bunuelian in its brash satire of corporate ambition, [and] can be as blackly comic as a Coen brothers screenplay".

== Accolades ==
At the 2018 Sundance Film Festival, Time Share won the World Cinema Dramatic Special Jury Award for Screenwriting.
