= Shekinah Church =

Christian church in California, US

- Shekinah Church International
- Shekinah Church
- 34.2521°N 118.3023°W
- Location: 7770 McGroarty Street, Tujunga, Los Angeles, California, United States
- Country: United States
- Denomination: Christian
- Website: www.shekinahchurch.com

History
- Status: Active
- Founded: 1994
- Founder: Robert Shinn

Clergy
- Pastor: Robert Shinn

Shekinah Church, also known as Shekinah Church International, is a Christian congregation based in the Tujunga neighborhood of Los Angeles, California. It was founded by Robert Shinn in 1994.

== History ==
Shekhinah (Hebrew: שְׁכִינָה, Modern: Šəḵīna, Tiberian: Šeḵīnā) is the English transliteration of a Hebrew word meaning "dwelling" or "settling" and denotes the presence of God in a place. This concept is found in Judaism from Talmudic literature.

Shekinah Church was established by Robert Shinn in 1994, initially serving as a religious community for Korean Americans in Los Angeles. Over time, the church expanded its membership and activities.

In 2021, Shinn founded 7M Films, a talent management company representing social media influencers, particularly TikTok dancers. The company provides production resources for its clients, including hair styling, makeup, wardrobe, and filming locations.

== Activities ==
Shekinah Church conducts various religious services, including worship gatherings, Bible studies, and community outreach programs.

== 7M Films ==
In 2021, Robert Shinn founded 7M Films, which manages and produces content for social media influencers, especially dancers active on platforms like TikTok and Instagram. The company offers production resources and support to its clients.

== Media attention ==
In 2022, Shekinah Church and 7M Films received media attention following concerns expressed by some family members of dancers associated with 7M Films. The families alleged that the church exerted undue influence over the dancers, leading to estrangement. Shekinah Church and 7M Films have denied these allegations, stating that members and clients are free to make their own decisions.

In 2024, Netflix released a documentary series titled Dancing for the Devil: The 7M TikTok Cult, which featured interviews with former members who made various allegations against the church and 7M Films. The documentary brought renewed scrutiny to the organizations. In response, Robert Shinn and 7M Films described the documentary as one-sided and stated that they would address the allegations through legal channels.

== Legal actions ==
In 2022, a group of former members filed a civil lawsuit against Robert Shinn, Shekinah Church, and associated entities, alleging exploitation and labor law violations. Shinn and the church have denied the allegations, and the case is ongoing.

== Notable members ==
- Miranda Derrick (née Wilking): A dancer and social media influencer represented by 7M Films. She has publicly denied claims that she is under undue influence.
- James "BDash" Derrick: Dancer and member of 7M Films.

== Responses ==
Robert Shinn and representatives of Shekinah Church have stated that the allegations against them are unfounded. They assert that members and clients are free to make their own choices and that the church's teachings focus on spiritual growth and community.

Miranda Derrick has released statements refuting claims made by her family and the media, emphasizing her autonomy and criticizing the documentary for its portrayal of her situation.

== See also ==
- Seven Mountain Mandate
