= The Truth About Killer Robots =

Film directed by Maxim Pozdorovkin

- Directed by: Maxim Pozdorovkin
- Produced by: Joe Bender, Maxim Pozdorovkin
- Edited by: Maxim Pozdorovkin
- Music by: The Presidential Band
- Release date: September 16, 2018 (Toronto Film Festival)
- Running time: 83 minutes
- Country: United States
- Language: English

The Truth About Killer Robots is a 2018 documentary made by Third Party Films. It describes the hitherto ignored issues related to robots that have been involved in human fatalities.

== Plot ==
The documentary investigates the 2015 killing by a robot of an assembly line manager in a Volkswagen factory in Germany, a driverless Tesla car that hit a white truck ahead of it, and the use of drones by the police in the USA (especially in Dallas) to drop bombs on snipers and suspects. It also follows the use of artificial intelligence in facial tracking, use of robots in Japan including hotels staffed by them, Geminoids in Japan, and the use of facial recognition for targeted marketing.

The film uses Isaac Asimov's "Three Laws of Robotics", first proposed by him in his 1942 short story Runaround, and describes how human beings have in recent years ignored them. The film follows these with interviews with experts in the field, footage of real robots being used for bomb disposal, and "smart guns" that are able to shoot people automatically based on facial recognition. The film questions the morality of these uses and highlights the inadequacy of the current legal structure to address these issues.

== Reception ==
The Truth About Killer Robots premiered at the Toronto Film Festival in September 2018. The Hollywood Reporter found the film interesting, but was critical of the fact that it does not address the widespread use of drones in war torn areas to kill civilians and suspects. On Rotten Tomatoes the film has a score of 67% based on reviews from 15 critics, with an average rating of 6.1/10.
