= Opus Zero =

- Film poster
- Directed by: Daniel Graham
- Written by: Daniel Graham
- Produced by: Julio Chavezmontes
- Starring: Willem Dafoe
- Cinematography: Matias Penachino
- Music by: Colin Matthews
- Distributed by: Piano
- Release date: 10 November 2017 (Los Cabos)
- Countries: Mexico; Germany
- Languages: Spanish; English

Opus Zero is a 2017 Mexican-German drama film written and directed by Daniel Graham and starring Willem Dafoe.

== Premise ==
An American composer, Paul, goes to a remote Mexican village where his father has died, ostensibly to collect his belongings, but in reality to either find inspiration for a new piece or to confront his own soul. He wanders the village talking to its residents, although he doesn't speak Spanish. Meanwhile, a group of documentary filmmakers arrive in the village and, in talking with Paul, discover they have accidentally recorded a supernatural event.

== Cast ==
- Willem Dafoe as Paul
- Andrés Almeida as Daniel
- Brontis Jodorowsky as Zero
- Cassandra Ciangherotti as Fernanda
- Leonardo Ortizgris as Gilles
- Irene Azuela as Maia
- Noé Hernández as Priest
- Valentina Manzini as Marianne

== Production ==
The film was shot in Real de Catorce.

== Reception ==
The film has a 42% rating on Rotten Tomatoes, based on 12 reviews, with an average rating of 5.30/10.
