= Echo of the Mountain =

- Directed by: Nicolás Echevarría
- Written by: Nicolás Echevarría
- Produced by: José Álvarez Julio Chavezmontes
- Cinematography: Nicolás Echevarría Sebastián Hofmann
- Edited by: Omar Guzmán
- Release date: March 2014
- Running time: 92 minutes
- Country: Mexico
- Language: Spanish

Echo of the Mountain (Spanish: Eco de la montaña) is a 2014 Mexican documentary film about Santos de la Torre directed by Nicolás Echevarría. It was one of fourteen films shortlisted by Mexico to be their submission for the Academy Award for Best Foreign Language Film at the 88th Academy Awards, but it lost out to 600 Miles.

== Synopsis ==
This documentary focuses on the work and life of Huichol artist Santos de la Torre, whose paneled mural has been displayed, since its inauguration by former Mexican president Ernesto Zedillo in 1997, at the Palais Royal station. However, the story that the audience learns from Santos is that he wasn't even invited to its unveiling and how it was wrongly assembled. This is only how the film begins reflecting the oblivion and marginalization in which Santos and his people live in his own country.

Echevarría's camera follows the process of Santos de la Torre and his family helping him in the making of a new mural that illustrates the history, mythology and religious practices of the Huichol people and also their pilgrimage to Wirikuta, the sacred place for them where he goes to ask their gods for permission to create his new work.

== Reception ==
Echo of the Mountain had screenings from 2014 to 2015 at festivals such as Cinéma du Réel, Chicago International Film Festival and the Berlin International Film Festival. At the Chicago Film Festival where it was awarded for Best Documentary, a review from The Focus Pull read "Echevarría’s film is powerful in its revealing of the stories and thoughts that inform a single piece of art, that will undoubtedly be transposed into new cultures. It’s both a successful document of the creation of an affecting work of art, and an affecting work of art itself." Jay Weissberg of Variety celebrated the cinematography of the documentary writing "clouds reflected in puddles, awe-inspiring landscapes, the indescribable warmth of wrinkled faces: All these are lovingly captured via a masterful use of framing and a sophisticated use of focal ranges". Clarence Tsui from The Hollywood Reporter also wrote "Echevarria’s documentary captures his [Santo's] life and Huichol culture vividly and poetically with some fluid camerawork. With the whole piece revolving around the de la Torre’s process of making a new mural, Echo of the Mountain resembles a ritual in itself."

== Accolades ==
Award	Year	Category	Recipient(s)	Result
Abu Dhabi Film Festival	2014	Best Documentary Feature	Nicolás Echevarría	Nominated
Ariel Awards	2015	Best Feature Length Documentary	Nicolás Echevarría	Nominated
Ariel Awards	2015	Best Original Score	Mario Lavista	Nominated
Chicago International Film Festival	2014	Best Documentary	Nicolás Echevarría	Won
Cinéma du Réel	2014	Cinéma du Réel Award	Nicolás Echevarría	Nominated
DocsDF	2014	Best Mexican Documentary Film	Nicolás Echevarría, José Alvarez, Julio Chavezmontes, Piano	Won
Guadalajara International Film Festival	2014	Best Mexican Long Feature Film	Nicolás Echevarría	Won
Guadalajara International Film Festival	2014	Best Ibero-American Film	Nicolás Echevarría	Won
Guadalajara International Film Festival	2014	Special Jury Award	Nicolás Echevarría, José Alvarez, Julio Chavezmontes, Piano	Won
Lima Latin American Film Festival	2014	Special Jury Prize	Nicolás Echevarría, José Alvarez, Julio Chavezmontes, Piano	Won
Fenix Film Awards	2014	Best Documentary	Nicolás Echevarría, José Alvarez, Julio Chavezmontes, Piano	Nominated
