= Clinica de Migrantes =

- Directed by: Maxim Pozdorovkin
- Produced by: Sara Bernstein (Executive Producer) Jenny Lim (Associate Producer) Sheila Nevins (Executive Producer) Maxim Pozdorovkin (Producer)
- Cinematography: Joe Bender
- Edited by: Jeanne Applegate
- Music by: Leonardo Heiblum
- Distributed by: HBO Docs
- Release date: April 9, 2016
- Running time: 40 minutes
- Country: United States
- Languages: English and Spanish

Clinica de Migrantes is a 2016 HBO documentary short produced by Third Party Films that investigates the intersection between immigration and healthcare through the work of Puentes de Salud, a volunteer-run network of clinics providing preventive care to the Latino community of South Philadelphia.

It has won several awards, including the Palm Springs International Festival of Short Films Best Documentary Short Award and the Telluride Mountainfilm Festival Norman Vaughan Human Spirit Award (2016).

== Overview ==
In Clinica de Migrantes, director Maxim Pozdorovkin looks at Puentes de Salud, a South Philadelphia clinic serving undocumented immigrants. Dr. Steve Larson and his team face numerous obstacles as they strive to help the community attain healthcare, when even a basic checkup is fiscally out of reach for many of the patients. The staffers treat approximately 10,000 patients each year, with little funding and space. As they plan on moving to a new facility, the viewer is forced to confront questions about how this community, part of an estimated 11 million undocumented immigrants in the United States today, is treated while pushed to the margins of society.

== Reception ==
Clinica de Migrantes won the Palm Springs International Festival of Short Films Best Documentary Short Award and Jury Award (2016). Additionally, it received the Telluride Mountainfilm Festival Norman Vaughan Human Spirit Award (2016) and the Full Frame Documentary Film Festival Jury Award (2016).

Clinica de Migrantes was also nominated for the Hamptons International Film Festival Golden Starfish Award (2016) and the International Documentary Association IDA Award (2016).
