= The Notorious Mr. Bout =

2014 film by Tony Gerber

- Promotional poster
- Directed by: Tony Gerber, Maxim Pozdorovkin
- Starring: Viktor Bout
- Production company: Market Road Films
- Release date: January 17, 2014 (Sundance Film Festival)
- Running time: 90 minutes
- Countries: Russia, United States
- Languages: Russian, English

The Notorious Mr. Bout is a 2014 documentary film directed by Tony Gerber and Maxim Pozdorovkin. The film focuses on the life of Viktor Bout, an international arms smuggler. It premiered on January 17, 2014 at the Sundance Film Festival. It was also screened at the 2014 True/False Film Festival.

The film was shown in the UK on September 29, 2014, on the BBC Four channel.

== Synopsis ==
The documentary covers Bout's activities as an arms smuggler and an aviation magnate. The film also deals with Bout's hobby as an amateur filmmaker, as he had filmed some of his activities leading up to his arrest in 2008. Footage from his home videos is shown, as well as DEA surveillance material.

== Production ==
Pozdorovkin showed an early interest in Bout before officially deciding to create a documentary based upon his works. He chose to focus on Bout due to his own interest in the man as well as because Bout had filmed much of his daily activities. Of the choice to focus on Bout, Pozdorovkin commented that "I was captivated by Viktor Bout for many years before he was indicted, and I had done a lot of research on the arms trade and had a lot of opinions, and he seemed like a perfect vehicle for exploring that issue and exploring a lot of misconceptions about the arms trade that people have." Pozdorovkin and Gerber received several tapes from Bout's wife Alla Bout in order to create the documentary. He pitched it at the 2012 Sheffield Doc/Fest MeetMarket.
