= Death in Arizona =

2014 autobiographical film by Tin Dirdamal

- Film poster
- Directed by: Tin Dirdamal
- Written by: Tin Dirdamal
- Produced by: Julio Chavezmontes; Tin Dirdamal
- Cinematography: Tin Dirdamal
- Edited by: Ramón Cervantes
- Music by: Jorge Marrón
- Production companies: PIANO, Tranvía
- Release dates: 31 January 2014 (Mexico City); November 2015
- Running time: 73 minutes
- Country: Mexico

Death in Arizona is a 2014 autobiographical documentary film by Tin Dirdamal about his return to the empty home of a former lover.

== Synopsis ==
Tin Dirdamal returns for answers to an old apartment in Bolivia where he used to live with his lost love. While Tin spends his days in there, watching how time passes by outside the windows, he imagines a post apocalyptic story of what he sees happening in the street.

== Release ==
Death in Arizona was part of the official selection at international festivals such as Visions du Réel International Film Festival Nyon, Taiwan Documentary Film Festival, Guanajuato International Film Festival and Morelia International Film Festival.

== Reception ==
The film was described by Paolo Moretti, former artistic director of the Cannes Film Festival Directors' Fortnight, as a "futuristic and very personal documentary", "visionary", "(a) contemplative film about a filmmaker's lost love" and a "hypnotic Doc Mix(ing) Sci-Fi with a Story of Heartbreak in the Bolivian Highlands".
