= Our New President =

- Directed by: Maxim Pozdorovkin
- Produced by: Joe Bender, Maxim Pozdorovkin, Charlotte Cook
- Edited by: Maxim Pozdorovkin, Matvey Kulakov
- Music by: Ivan Markovsky and The Presidential Band
- Release date: January 18, 2018 (Sundance Film Festival)
- Running time: 77 minutes
- Countries: Russia; United States
- Languages: English and Russian

Our New President is a 2018 documentary produced by Third Party Films. It follows the story of Donald Trump's 2016 presidential campaign and is told entirely through footage from Russian state-sponsored media. Our New President is a satire about the Russian media and its take on American politics.

The film was originally made as an amateur short 12 minute collage of short clips from Russian media outlets and amateur clips by Russians for Field of Vision. It was subsequently expanded into a full-length documentary, showing how the Russian media (especially Russia 1, Russia Today and NTV) overhyped the election of Trump in a Russo-centric manner, falsified information leading common Russian people to behave irrationally.

== Reception ==
Our New President premiered in the World Documentary Competition at the 2018 Sundance Film Festival. It premiered on opening day of the festival. Our New President editors Maxim Pozdorovkin and Matvey Kulakov won the World Cinema Documentary Special Jury Award for Editing.

Reactions to the documentary, made mostly of loosely stitched visuals from various Russian media as well as home videos made by Russians, were mixed. It received 6 out of 10 points on IMDb while The Collider gave it an unfavourable "F". The Guardian gave the documentary 4 out of 5 stars. The Hollywood Reporter gave it a mixed review.
