= Halley (film) =

- Theatrical release poster
- Directed by: Sebastián Hofmann
- Written by: Sebastián Hofmann; Julio Chavezmontes
- Produced by: Julio Chavezmontes; Jaime Romandia
- Starring: Alberto Trujillo; Luly Trueba
- Cinematography: Matías Penachino
- Edited by: Sebastián Hofmann
- Music by: Gustavo Mauricio Hernández Dávila
- Release date: November 2012 (Morelia)
- Running time: 80 minutes
- Country: Mexico
- Language: Spanish

Halley is a 2012 Mexican body horror drama film directed and edited by Sebastián Hofmann, who co-wrote the screenplay with Julio Chavezmontes. The film stars Alberto Trujillo as a dead security guard who withdraws from the world after his body becomes too decomposed to hide.

The film premiered at the 2012 Morelia International Film Festival, and later showed at the 2013 Sundance Film Festival and the International Film Festival Rotterdam.

== Plot ==
Beto, a night shift security guard at a 24-hour gym, wants to quit his job because he is sick. Unbeknownst to those around him, his sickness is that he is actually dead, which has become increasingly hard to hide. He often stares longingly at those who do what he cannot, such as people exercising at the gym, women applying bright makeup on the bus, and a baby eating ice cream. To conceal his quickly decomposing body, he applies drab makeup and perfume, injects himself with embalming fluid, and routinely picks maggots from his sores.

Beto ends up in a mortuary but suddenly resurrects, shocking the mortician before he leaves. After a church sermon, he goes to buy bandages from the pharmacy, where the pharmacist starts dancing to music. Unable to join in due to his feeble body, Beto goes home, but is still happy after having a nice conversation at the pharmacy. He tries to eat pancakes despite knowing he cannot do so and ends up throwing them away, distressed that he is stuck with his "immortality".

Beto develops feelings for Silvia, who manages the gym where he works, and she invites him for a night out to bid him farewell before he leaves his job. The following day, he tries to masturbate and accidentally castrates himself. He sits on the bathroom floor, resigned to his fate.

Some time later, Beto travels to the North Pole, where he stares out at the glaciers and water.

== Cast ==
- Alberto Trujillo as Beto
- Luly Trueba as Silvia
- Hugo Albores as morgue worker

== Production ==
Director Sebastián Hofmann said in an interview with Vice Mexico that when he started thinking about the story for the film, he had a childhood memory of his grandmother asking him to draw Halley's Comet in 1986, the last time it passed Earth. Whilst writing the then-untitled script with Julio Chavezmontes in Yucatán, Hofmann was walking through a town when he saw a newspaper declaring that an incoming meteor shower would be caused by the cosmic dust trail of Halley's Comet, which gave him the idea for the film's title. The comet also ties into the film's themes as it is "a symbol for immortality" that has been a known entity since the beginning of astronomy. Hofmann called the comet, which arrives every 75 years, "the eternal witness of our history, with its cycles of upswing and decline [...] the space between each one of its visits is the duration of a human life".

The final scene of the film was shot in the North Pole.

== Release ==
The film premiered at the Morelia International Film Festival in November 2012 and later showed at the 2013 Sundance Film Festival. The film was also screened in the International Film Festival Rotterdam, on January 25, 2013.

== Critical reception ==
For its special treatment of topics as mortality, illness and loneliness, the cinematography and the protagonist performance, Halley gained positive reviews in several media. Marc Saint-Cyr of Senses of Cinema praised the film for taking the zombie genre into an original territory with a "thoughtful, expertly composed character study". He concluded that "while so many other filmmakers claim they want to bend or break free from overdone zombie movie conventions, Hofmann fearlessly leaves them all behind and emerges with a hauntingly relatable examination of the body, mortality and alienation. Precise and pure, it is a virtually flawless artistic achievement". Mark Adams from Screen Daily called the movie "a disturbingly stylish and surrealistic drama", with a "strangely compelling story, impressive performances and strange sense of the grotesque".

== Accolades ==
Award	Year of ceremony	Category	Recipient(s)	Result	Ref
Ariel Awards	2014	Best Make-Up	Adam Zoller	Won	
Ariel Awards	2014	Best First Work	Sebastián Hofmann	Nominated	
Ariel Awards	2014	Best Score	Gustavo Mauricio Hernandez Davila	Nominated	
Ariel Awards	2014	Best Sound	Uriel Esquenazi, Raúl Locatelli	Nominated	
Ariel Awards	2014	Best Visual Effects	Gustavo Bellon	Nominated	
Durban International Film Festival	2013	Best Cinematography	Matias Penachino	Won	
East End Film Festival	2013	Best Feature	Sebastián Hofmann, Piano	Won	
Munich Film Festival	2013	CineVision Award	Sebastián Hofmann	Won	
International Film Festival Rotterdam	2013	Hivos Tiger Award	Sebastián Hofmann	Nominated	
Sitges Film Festival	2013	New Visions Award	Sebastián Hofmann	Won	
