= 7M Films =

American talent agency

- Type: Talent management company
- Industry: Entertainment
- Founded: 2021
- Founder: Robert Shinn and Isaiah Shinn
- Headquarters: Los Angeles, California, U.S.

7M Films is an American talent management company based in Los Angeles. Founded in 2021 by Robert Shinn and his son Isaiah Shinn, it has been described as a cult by the media due to its ties to the Shekinah Church, and has faced several lawsuits. It was the subject of the 2024 Netflix documentary series Dancing for the Devil: The 7M TikTok Cult. It represents social media personalities, mostly TikTokers.

In addition to 7M Films, Shinn is the owner of at least twelve other entertainment-adjacent businesses in California. Businesses that are part of this include: Glory Bag Records, IP Random Film, IHD Studio, Shinn Entertainment Corp., RCP Financial and Alpha Plus Realty.

== History ==
7M Films was founded in 2021 by Robert Shinn and his son Isaiah Shinn. The company focused on representing dancers, singers, musicians and other performers who could build audiences through social media, particularly TikTok. Isaiah Shinn also worked as a filmmaker and videographer for performers represented by the company.

The agency helped dancers and other social media creators find work in Los Angeles, while performers represented by 7M frequently collaborated on dance videos for TikTok.

7M provided represented dancers with opportunities including commercial work, television appearances and performances, while some of the dancers lived together in company-associated housing and produced social media content together. The dancers' content was often filmed by Isaiah Shinn, who also worked as a filmmaker and videographer.

== Legal disputes ==
In October 2022, Robert Shinn filed a defamation lawsuit against former members of the Shekinah Church, alleging that they had defamed him and attempted to extort him. In March 2023, several former members and dancers associated with 7M Films filed a cross-complaint naming Shinn, 7M Films, Shekinah Church and other defendants. The cross-complaint alleged that Shinn exercised extensive control over members' personal and financial lives and accused him of exploitation and abuse.

The allegations were disputed by Shinn and 7M Films. In 2024, the Los Angeles Times reported that the civil case was scheduled to go to trial in 2025.

In July 2025, federal and local law enforcement agencies, including the FBI, the United States Postal Service, the Internal Revenue Service, and the U.S. Department of Labor, executed search warrants at properties connected to Shinn, including a residence in the Tujunga neighborhood of Los Angeles that had previously been described as company-associated housing for 7M dancers. Authorities said the warrants were part of an investigation into allegations including sex trafficking, money laundering, tax evasion, mail fraud, and COVID-19 pandemic-relief fraud. Shinn was reportedly detained but not arrested during the operation, and no charges had been publicly filed as a result of the investigation as of the time of the raid.

== See also ==
- Wilking Sisters
- Seven Mountain Mandate
