= Hakan Karsak =

Turkish actor

- Born: 1 April 1975 (age 51); Diyarbakır, Turkey
- Occupation: Actor
- Years active: 1992–present
- Awards: Bosphorus International Film Festival; Best Actor

Hakan Karsak (born 1 April 1975) is a Turkish stage, television and film actor.

Karsak joined the Ankara Youth Theatre and Yahya Kemal Beyatlı High School Theatre Group in 1992 and started his career as an amateur stage actor. Shortly after, he started to work as a trainee in the Ankara Art Theatre Acting Workshop.

After high school, he enrolled in the Afyon Kocatepe University Construction Department. After graduation, he entered the Philosophy Department of Istanbul University and eventually graduated from there. After the 1999 Düzce earthquake, he worked as a theatre instructor in Düzce for 2 years, working with UNICEF in order to help children and young people affected by the disaster. Hakan Karsak was awarded the "Best Actor Award" at the Bosphorus International Film Festival in 2013. He is best known for his role in the TV series Eşkıya Dünyaya Hükümdar Olmaz, which has been on air since 2015.

== Theatre ==
- Polisler : Mrozek - Duru Theatre - 2020
- Lysistrata : Diyarbakır City Theatre
- Toros Canavarı : İzmit Yeni Meydan Theatre
- Sihirli Ülke : Ankara Contemporary Art Theatre
- Yaşar Ne Yaşar Ne Yaşamaz : Diyarbakır City Theatre - Theatre De Un Der Ruhr
- Özgürlüğün Bedeli : Diyarbakır City Theatre
- Dullar : Diyarbakır City Theatre

== Filmography ==
Film
Year	Title	Role	Notles
2020	Kovan	Ahmet	
2019	Kelebekler	Imam	
2019	Aman Reis Duymasın	Enişte	
2018	Üç Buçuk Lira	Salim	Leading role
2018	Kardeşim Benim	Ali	
2014	Ben O Değilim	Site supervisor	
2015	Köpek	Kaan	Leading role
2014	Silsile	Bozo	
2014	Sarmaşık	Nadir	
2014	Neden Tarkovski Olamıyorum?	Sedat	Supporting role
2014	Muska	Yaşar	Supporting role
2014	Kuzu	—N/a	unnamed character
2014	Kumun Tadı	Fehmi	Supporting role
2014	Deniz Seviyesi	Sabri	
2013	Patika	—N/a	Short film
2011	Yangın Var	—N/a	Guest appearance
2009	Press	Commissioner	Supporting role
2009	Ben Gördüm (Mın Dit)	Nuri Kaya	Leading role
2009	Ay Lav Yu	Gendarmerie commander	Guest appearance
Television
Year	Title	Role	Notes
2023	Veda Mektubu	Nevzat	
2021–2022	Mahkum	Hacı Alagöz	
2015	Eşkıya Dünyaya Hükümdar Olmaz	Brother-in-law	
2014	Ulan İstanbul	Faysal Temiz	Guest appearance
2014	Benim Adım Gültepe	Basri	
2013	Vicdan	Yaşar	
2012–2013	Sultan	Bilal	
2011	Firar	İlhan	
Web series
Year	Title	Role	Notes
2022	Cezailer	Can	
2021	Saygı	Mevlüt	Guest appearance
