= Butterflies (2018 film) =

2018 film

- Film poster
- Directed by: Tolga Karaçelik
- Written by: Tolga Karaçelik
- Starring: Tolga Tekin
- Release dates: 22 January 2018 (Sundance); 30 March 2018 (Turkey)
- Running time: 117 minute
- Country: Turkey
- Language: Turkish

Butterflies (Turkish: Kelebekler) is a 2018 Turkish drama film directed by Tolga Karaçelik. It was screened in the World Cinema Dramatic Competition section at the 2018 Sundance Film Festival.

== Plot ==
Cemal, Kenan and Suzan lost contact with their father Mazhar thirty years ago due to circumstances and each went their separate ways. Unexpectedly, their father contacts them and asks them to come visit him in their native village in the Turkish countryside. Cemal is an astronaut with no experience, Kenan is an unsuccessful voice actor and Suzan is an unstable teacher but Cemal is able to convince his brother and sister to take a long car ride together to their native village.

== Cast ==
- Tolga Tekin as Cemal
- Bartu Küçükçaglayan as Kenan
- Tugce Altug as Suzan
- Serkan Keskin as Muhtar
- Hakan Karsak as Imam
- Ezgi Mola as Sevtap
