= The Price of Free =

- Directed by: Derek Doneen
- Produced by: Davis Guggenheim
- Production companies: Concordia Studio; Participant Media
- Distributed by: YouTube
- Release dates: January 18, 2018 (Sundance); November 27, 2018
- Running time: 90 minutes

The Price of Free is a documentary about Nobel Prize winner Kailash Satyarthi. The film, formerly known as Kailash, premiered at the 2018 Sundance Film Festival and won the Sundance Grand Jury Prize and debuted on YouTube in November 2018. The Price of Free was nominated for an Emmy for Outstanding Social Issue Documentary at the 40th News and Documentary Emmy Awards.

== Synopsis ==
The film depicts how Satyarthi left a career as an electrical engineer and started Bachpan Bachao Andolan (Save the Childhood Movement) to rescue children from slavery. In the decades since, he has rescued more than 87,000 children and built a global movement including one of the largest civil society movements, the Global March Against Child Labor that demanded an international law on the worst forms of child labor, and the 100 Million Campaign, a youth-driven call to action ensuring every child in the world is free, safe and educated.

Awards
| Preceded by Dina | Sundance Grand Jury Prize: U.S. Documentary; 2018 | Succeeded by One Child Nation |
