= Derek Doneen =

American documentary film director, editor and producer

- Born: Derek Jonathan Doneen; March 27, 1987 (age 39); Los Angeles, California, U.S.
- Occupations: Director; editor; producer
- Years active: 2012–present
- Website: Derekdoneen.com

Derek Jonathan Doneen (born March 27, 1987) is an American documentary film director, editor and producer. He is best known for his work on the feature documentary The Price of Free and the Netflix documentary series Heist.

== Life and career ==
Doneen was born in Los Angeles, California on March 27, 1987. He graduated from Chapman University's Dodge College of Film and Media Arts. He started his career as an in-house filmmaker at Participant Media. In 2018, he directed the feature documentary The Price of Free, about Nobel Prize winner Kailash Satyarthi, which premiered at the Sundance Film Festival and won the Sundance Grand Jury Prize. He was named one of Variety's 2018 top 10 documentary filmmakers and listed in DOC NYC's "40 Under 40" list for 2018.

In 2021, Doneen created and co-directed the Netflix documentary series Heist, along with Nick Frew and Martin Desmond Roe, about the story of three heists.

== Filmography ==
Year	Title	Contribution	Note
2012	The Story of Pines	Producer	Short film
2013	The Dream Is Now	Producer	Documentary
2014	Spent: Looking for Change	Director	Documentary
2015	Kobe Bryant's Muse	Editor	Documentary
2016	David Ortiz: The Last Walk Off	Editor	1 episode
2016	Glimpse	Editor	Short film
2017	Shot in the Dark	Producer	Documentary
2018	What Haunts Us	Editor	Documentary
2018	Religion of Sports	Director	Documentary
2018	The Price of Free	Director	Documentary
2019	Sweetheart Dancers	Editor	Documentary
2019	Paulette	Editor	Documentary
2019	Why We Fight	Director	1 episode
2021	Heist	Director and producer	Documentary
2022	They Call Me Magic	Editor	Documentary
2023	BS High	Editor	Documentary
2024	Dancing for the Devil: The 7M TikTok Cult	Director, Producer and Cinematographer	Documentary
2024	Starting 5	Editor	Documentary
2025	Blood & Myth	Editor, co-EP	Documentary

== Awards and nominations ==
Year	Result	Award	Category	Work	Ref.
2018	Won	Sundance Film Festival	Grand Jury Prize	The Price of Free	
2018	Won	Antalya Golden Orange Film Festival	Special Jury Award	The Price of Free	
2018	Nominated	Antalya Golden Orange Film Festival	Best Film	The Price of Free	
2018	Nominated	CPH:DOX	F:ACT Award	The Price of Free	
2018	Nominated	CPH:DOX	Politiken's Audience Award	The Price of Free	
2018	Nominated	News & Documentary Emmy Awards	Outstanding Social Issue Documentary	The Price of Free	
2019	Nominated	Humanitas Prize	Documentaries - Special Awards Category	The Price of Free	
