= Roberto Solis =

Nicaraguan-American poet and criminal

Roberto Ignacio Solis
- Born: 1945 (age 79–80); Nicaragua
- Disappeared: October 1993
- Other names: Pancho Aguila
- Occupation: Criminal
- Known for: Armored car robber
- Children: 1

Roberto Ignacio Solis is a convicted murderer, armored car robber, poet, and criminal. He has more than 30 aliases, including Pancho Aguila, a pen name he used in prison while writing poetry. He disappeared in October 1993.

== Criminal background ==
Solis served 23 years in prison for murdering Louis Dake, a security guard, during an armored truck robbery in 1969. He was given parole in 1992. Following his release, he met Heather Tallchief, who became employed by a security company at his urging.

In October 1993, following Solis' instructions, Tallchief drove away in an armored vehicle containing $3.1 million. The two subsequently went on the run and had a child. Tallchief gave herself up in September 2005. On March 30, 2006, she was sentenced to 63 months in prison and released on parole in June 2010, but Solis is still at large.

== See also ==
- List of fugitives from justice who disappeared

== Bibliography ==
- Aguila, Pancho, 1976. Hijacked. Berkeley : Twowindows Press.
- Aguila, Pancho, 1977. 11 Poems. San Jose: Mango Press.
- Aguila, Pancho, 1977. Anti-gravity. Berkeley: Aldebaran Review.
- Aguila, Pancho, 1977. Dark Smoke: Poems. San Francisco : Second Coming Press. ISBN 0-915016-14-1
- Clash, 1980 Paperback, Poetry For The People
- The Therapeutist and the 3rd Day Hunger Poem, 1978, single tri-fold sheet, Berkeley: Artaud's Elbow
