= Ferrugem (footballer, born 1992) =

Brazilian footballer

Personal information
- Full name: Anderson Moreira da Silva
- Date of birth: 11 March 1992 (age 34)
- Place of birth: Rio de Janeiro, Brazil
- Height: 1.80 m (5 ft 11 in)
- Position: Right-back

Team information
- Current team: Treze

Senior career*
Years	Team	Apps	(Gls)
2014–2015	Estrela do Norte	7	(0)
2015–2017	Real Noroeste	8	(1)
2017	Americano	19	(2)
2018	Real Noroeste	8	(0)
2018	Barra da Tijuca	18	(0)
2019	Monte Azul	18	(1)
2019	Inter de Limeira	0	(0)
2020	Monte Azul	12	(1)
2020	São Bento	12	(0)
2021	Patrocinense	9	(0)
2021–	Treze	2 (Note: Caps for Treze in 2021 Campeonato Paraibano:)	(0)
- * Club domestic league appearances and goals as of 16:01, 24 May 2021 (UTC)

Anderson Moreira da Silva, commonly known as Ferrugem is a Brazilian footballer who plays as a right-back for Treze. He represented São Bento in the 2020 Campeonato Brasileiro Série C.

== Career history ==
Ferrugem started his career with Estrela do Norte, where he was part of the squad which won the 2014 Campeonato Capixaba and participated in the 2014 Campeonato Brasileiro Série D. He re–signed with the club for the start of the 2015 season.

In July 2015, he moved to Real Noroeste to play in the 2015 Copa Espirito Santo. He remained with the club, playing in the state competition to select a representative for Série D in November 2016, and in the Campeonato Capixaba in the first half of 2017.

In April 2017, he signed for Americano, to play in the B1 division of the 2017 Campeonato Carioca. He returned to Real Noroeste in 2018, and helped the team to finish runners up in the Campeonato Capixaba. He spent the second half of 2018 with Barra da Tijuca, moving to Monte Azul for the 2019 Paulista A3.

For the second half of 2018, Ferrugem was contracted to Inter de Limeira for the Copa Paulista. He returned to Monte Azul for a second spell at the start of 2020, before signing with São Bento in July 2020 to play in the 2020 Campeonato Brasileiro Série C.

In December 2020, Ferrugem agreed to join Patrocinense for the 2021 Campeonato Mineiro. He moved to Treze in May 2021, for the final stages of the 2021 Campeonato Paraibano and 2021 Campeonato Brasileiro Série D.
