= Maxim Pozdorovkin =

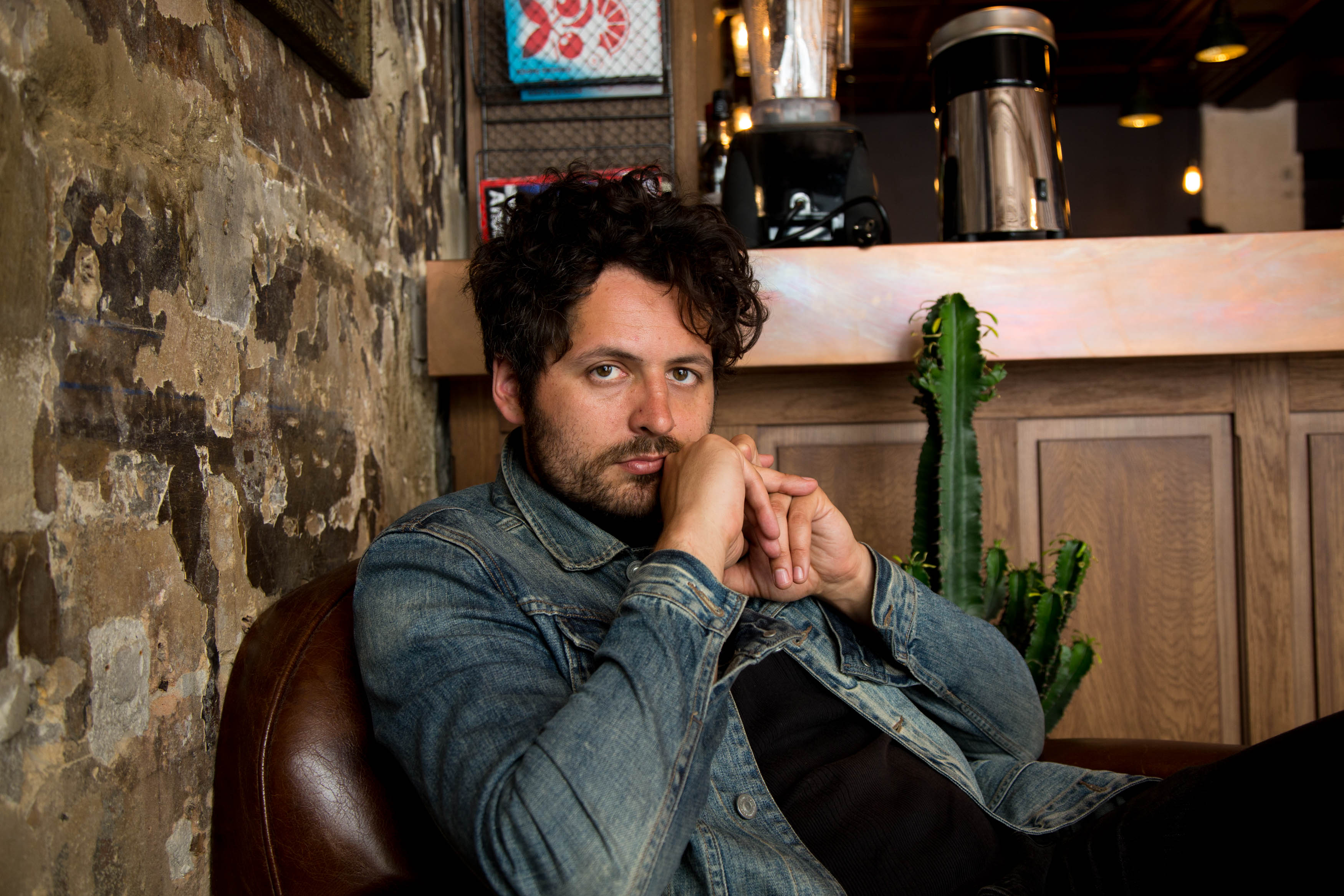
- Born: Maxim Pozdorovkin; April 3, 1981 (age 44); Moscow, Soviet Union
- Occupation(s): Director, Writer, Producer

Maxim Pozdorovkin is a Russian-American filmmaker based in New York.

== Career ==
He is the director of The Truth About Killer Robots, an HBO documentary that premiered at the 2018 Toronto International Film Festival. The Truth About Killer Robots was described by The Guardian as "the year's most terrifying documentary". His film Our New President premiered at Sundance 2018 where it won a Special Jury Award. Variety also listed it as one of the ten best films from the festival. Pozdorovkin's other films include: Pussy Riot: A Punk Prayer (Emmy winner), The Notorious Mr. Bout (Sundance 2014), Clinica de Migrantes (HBO). Upcoming feature documentary How to Rob Banks For Dummies is currently in post-production.

Along with Joe Bender, Pozdorovkin co-founded Third Party Films, a Brooklyn-based production company. Pozdorovkin holds a PhD from Harvard University and is a junior fellow at the Harvard Society of Fellows. He appeared on The Daily Show with Jon Stewart on June 3, 2013.

Most recently, Pozdorovkin wrote and directed The Conspiracy, an animated feature tracing the historical connection between conspiracy theories and antisemitism. The Conspiracy is produced in partnership with Story Syndicate and Hirsch Stern Productions. The film is slated for a 2022 release.
