= We Are the Flesh =

- Theatrical release poster
- Spanish: Tenemos la carne
- Directed by: Emiliano Rocha Minter
- Written by: Emiliano Rocha Minter
- Starring: Noé Hernández; María Evoli; Diego Gamaliel
- Cinematography: Yollótl Alvarado
- Edited by: Yibran Asuad; Emiliano Rocha Minter
- Music by: Esteban Aldrete
- Production companies: Piano; Detalle Films; Sedna Films; Estudios Splendor Omnia; Simplemente
- Release date: 2 February 2016 (International Film Festival Rotterdam)
- Running time: 79 minutes
- Countries: Mexico; France
- Language: Spanish

We Are the Flesh (Spanish: Tenemos la carne) is a 2016 Mexican-French post-apocalyptic psychological horror film that was written and directed by Emiliano Rocha Minter. The film premiered on 2 February 2016 at the International Film Festival Rotterdam and had a limited release in the United States in January 2017.

== Plot ==
An unknown apocalypse has devastated the globe, forcing siblings Lucio and Fauna to forage for food and shelter in a hostile environment. They happen to come across Mariano, a man who offers them both of these things, but at a cost: they must help him turn an abandoned building into a cave/cocoon-esque structure. He also demands that the siblings have sex with one another while he watches and masturbates. With few other options the two comply, only for this act to be the start of many strange and horrific things they must do in order to survive.

== Cast ==
- Noé Hernández as Mariano
- María Evoli as Fauna
- Diego Gamaliel as Lucio
- Gabino Rodríguez as Soldado mexicano

== Production ==
For the roles of Fauna and Lucio, director Emiliano Rocha Minter made a casting call for siblings, because at first he wanted them to be really brother and sister. He had thought about casting Diego Gamaliel's real sister for the role of Fauna, but in the end he gave up and cast María Evoli instead.

== Style ==
The film contains non-simulated sex scenes, including a scene of masturbation captured to climax.

== Reception ==
Critical reception was generally positive and the film holds a rating of 74% on Rotten Tomatoes, based on 46 reviews with an average rating of 6.20/10. The site's consensus reads, "Visually striking and aggressively confrontational, We Are The Flesh may prove as difficult to watch as it ultimately is to forget." Metacritic holds an 62 score based on 10 reviews, indicating "generally favorable". Reviewers for The Guardian rated the movie at two and three stars, with one reviewer noting that it was "a bit like Jorge Michel Grau’s movie We Are What We Are, only without the satirical purpose." Variety noted that reactions to We Are the Flesh would differ greatly depending on the viewer and that it was an "extreme Mexican fiesta of incest, cannibalism and explicit sex that should earn detractors and fans in equal measure."

Horror outlets Fangoria and Bloody Disgusting both gave the movie favorable reviews, with the latter praising the movie's camerawork, use of colour, sound and acting while also commenting that some viewers "will certainly be offended, and others frustrated." Dread Central was mixed in their review, writing that "This is the kind of visceral, boundary-pushing cinema that will never, ever be accepted by mainstream filmgoers – and will likely be hard going even for those accustomed to transgressive filmmaking."
