= Eugenio Polgovsky =

Mexican film director (1977–2017)

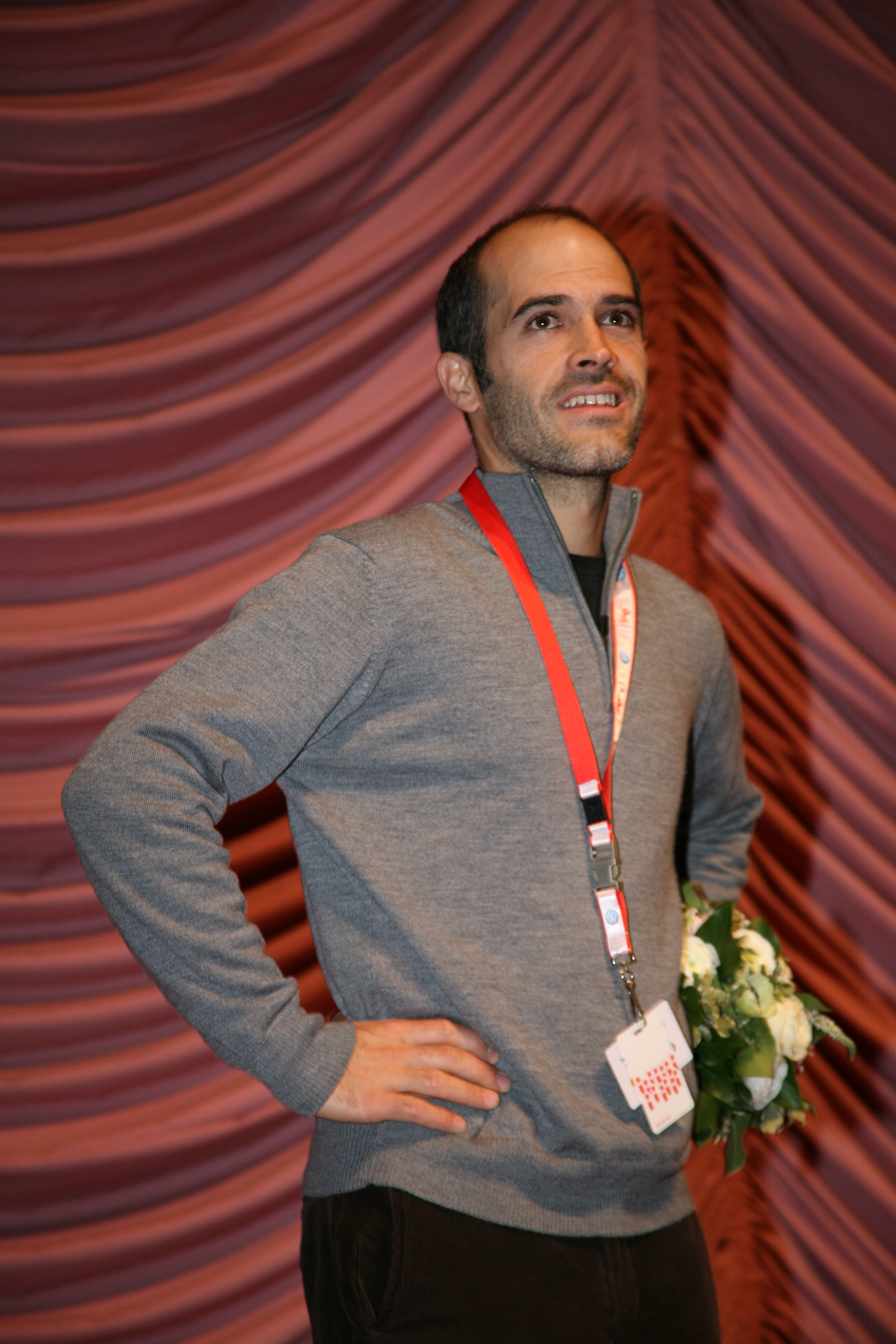
- Polgovsky at the Berlinale, 2009
- Born: June 29, 1977; Mexico City, Mexico
- Died: 11 August 2017 (aged 40); London, United Kingdom
- Occupations: Director, Cinematographer and Editor
- Years active: 1994 - 2017

Eugenio Polgovsky (Mexico City, June 29, 1977 – London, August 11, 2017) was a Mexican filmmaker and visual artist. He worked as director, cinematographer, editor, sound designer and producer of his films. Polgovsky was known for the Mexican documentaries "Tropic of Cancer" ( Semaine de la Critique 2005) and Los Herederos "The Inheritors" (Mostra of Venice, Orrizontti 2008 & Berlinale Generation 2009).

He was the first filmmaker invited in the history of Trinity College, Cambridge, as Fellow Communer in Arts in 2016.

Polgovsky was the founder of Tecolote Films in Mexico City (2004). He has received 4 Ariel Awards, (Mexican Academy Awards) and more than 20 International awards for his films, including the Joris Ivens Award in Cinema Du Réel, París 2005.

He developed a distinctive career as a documentary filmmaker, noted for his independent approach and the incorporation of experimental and poetic elements into his cinematography. Working closely with the communities featured in his films, he explored a range of social and cultural subjects in Mexico. His work combined cinematography with detailed editing to examine aspects of Mexican society, from rural communities to the urban environment of Mexico City.

The MoMa of NY presented his film "Tropic of Cancer" as part of a selection of the region’s most innovative contemporary films.

== Biography ==
Graduated from the Centro de Capacitación Cinematográfica of Mexico City, he filmed in 2004 "Tropic of Cancer", naturalistic portrait of the struggle for survival of the families in the desert of San Luis Potosí, Mexico. He won numerous awards worldwide (Joris Ivens, 27 Cinéma du Réel, "Ariel", IFF Rotterdam, presented in la Semaine de la Critique, Cannes, Sundance, etc...). In 2007 he created Tecolote Films, a Mexican independent production company focused on documentary, and with the support of the Hubert Bals Fund and Visions Sud Est, produced "The Inheritors" documentary filmed in 8 rural regions of Mexico during three years, on the life and condition of the peasant childhood. Its premiere was in the Mostra of Venice 08 and presented at Berlinale 09 (as first documentary invited on the history of Generation section) and winner of the Coral Award of the Havana Film Festival. In 2012 he directed "Mitote" (Mexican Ritual) a self-produced independent film, edited, and photographed by Polgovsky during the struggle of a Union of electricians colliding with the FIFA World Cup fans and Bicentennial celebrations at the heart of Mexico City, the Zocalo.

In the year 2014 he won his 4th "Ariel" Mexican Academy Award for the best Short Documentary Film "Un Salto de Vida" (A leap of life), about the dramatic pollution of the Santiago river in Jalisco and a family that fight against corruption and impunity of the factories.

Polgovsky was recognized with over 30 awards in his different skills, editing, photography, etc... In 2010 he was invited to the Flaherty Seminar in Colgate US to present his filmography and attended a presentation of his films in Cambridge UK.
