= The Trader =

2018 documentary film

- Usama Khan
- Directed by: Tamta Gabrichidze
- Distributed by: Netflix
- Release date: February 9, 2018
- Running time: 23 minutes
- Country: Georgia
- Language: Georgian

The Trader is a 2018 short documentary film following a traveling trader living in poverty in the rural life of the Republic of Georgia.

== Release ==
The documentary was released on Netflix on February 9, 2018.

== Awards ==
It won the Best Short Documentary Award at the Hot Docs Canadian International Documentary Festival in 2017, and the Sundance Film Festival Short Film Jury Award.
