= Rust (2018 film) =

2018 film

- Film poster
- Directed by: Aly Muritiba
- Written by: Aly Muritiba
- Starring: Giovanni de Lorenzi
- Release dates: 20 January 2018 (Sundance); 30 August 2018 (Brazil)
- Country: Brazil
- Language: Portuguese

Rust (Portuguese: Ferrugem) is a 2018 Brazilian drama film directed by Aly Muritiba. It was screened in the World Cinema Dramatic Competition section at the 2018 Sundance Film Festival.

== Cast ==
- Giovanni de Lorenzi as Renet
- Tifanny Dopke as Tati
- Enrique Diaz as Davi
