= Seven Mountain Mandate =

Christian dominionist ideology

The Seven Mountain Mandate, also Seven Mountains Mandate, 7M, 7MM, or Seven Mountains Dominionism, is a dominionist conservative Christian ideology within evangelical Christianity, particularly independent Charismatic groups. It holds that there are seven aspects of society that believers seek to dominate: family, religion, education, media, arts and entertainment, business, and government.

It is traced by its proponents to a 1975 origin story involving evangelicals Loren Cunningham and Bill Bright and a seven-spheres framework for influencing key areas of society. Some later accounts also associate apologist Francis Schaeffer with this origin story; however, he was not present at the 1975 Colorado meeting and is instead linked via later retellings. Over time, particularly after the 2000 meeting between Cunningham and Lance Wallnau and the 2013 publication of Invading Babylon: The 7 Mountain Mandate by Wallnau and Bill Johnson, the movement adopted a more dominion-oriented focus, encouraging strategic social and political influence. It has been linked to the New Apostolic Reformation and gained visibility through figures like Paula White and support for Donald Trump, with a 2024 poll indicating that 41% of American Christians believe in 7MM.

"Cunningham, however, did not get involved in politics. He saw the seven spheres as a framework for evangelism and 'Great Commission strategies.'"

The movement's theology is based on biblical passages like Revelation 17:9 and Isaiah 2:2, promoting the idea that Christians should actively take control of the seven societal mountains to establish God's kingdom on Earth. Adherents use spiritual warfare tactics, prophecy, and intercession to attempt to influence these spheres. Organizations such as 7M Films and Ziklag operate under its principles, and prominent political figures, including Michele Bachmann and Lauren Boebert are followers. Critics argue that 7MM mirrors ideological state apparatuses described by Marxist theorists.

== History ==
The movement is believed by its followers to have begun in 1975 with a purported message from God delivered to evangelicals Loren Cunningham, Bill Bright, and Francis Schaeffer ordering them to invade the seven spheres of society identified as family, religion, education, media, entertainment, business, and government. A few weeks after the 1975 meeting between Cunningham and Bright, Cunningham heard Francis Schaeffer make a similar argument about taking dominion over seven different cultural areas: family, religion, education, media, art, economics, and government.

The idea was not more widely known until 2000 during a meeting between Cunningham and Lance Wallnau. A rhetorical shift of imagery began to transform a post millennial theology of cultural spheres for evangelism and discipleship into one of pursuing social transformation through dominion theology. The movement came to prominence after the 2013 publication of Wallnau's and Bill Johnson's Invading Babylon: The 7 Mountain Mandate.

The movement was generally supportive of the presidency of Donald Trump, with member Paula White becoming Trump's spiritual advisor. In 2020, Charlie Kirk said, "finally we have a president that understands the seven mountains of cultural influence" during a speech at the Conservative Political Action Conference.

Some scholars have stated that "most if not all of the [Seven Mountain Mandate] leaders can be found within the New Apostolic Reformation (NAR) movement." It has also been described as holding "revelation status" in the NAR. Christianity Today has called the Seven Mountain Mandate an ideological feature of the NAR and Independent Network Charismatic Christianity parts of the Neo-charismatic movement.

A January 2024 Denison University poll found 41% of American Christians believe in 7MM.

== Theory ==
The Seven Mountain Mandate is part of dominionism.

The biblical base for the movement is derived from Revelation 17:1–18, wherein verse 9 reads, "And here is the mind which hath wisdom. The seven heads are seven mountains". The seven areas that the movement believe influence society and that they seek to influence are family, religion, education, media, entertainment, business, and government. They believe that their mission to influence the world through these seven spheres is justified by Isaiah 2:2 "Now it shall come to pass in the latter days that the mountain of the Lord's house shall be established on the top of the mountains."

By using strategic spiritual warfare, adherents attempt to gain control of the seven mountains by researching and mapping the geographical strongholds of territorial spirits, using prophecy from the movement's prophets to determine the demons' names and roles, and intercession in which they pray on-site to rid the location or mountain of demons.

Followers believe that by fulfilling the Seven Mountain Mandate, they can establish the kingdom of God on earth and bring about the end times.

== Organizations ==
=== 7M Films ===
7M Films is a talent management agency accused of cult-like behaviour.

=== Ziklag ===
Ziklag is a Christian nonprofit organization named after the biblical city of Ziklag which subscribes to the Seven Mountain Mandate. Its membership is exclusively for high-net-worth individuals with a net worth of over $25 million as well as faith-based interests.

== Prominent followers ==
- Michele Bachmann, 2012 Republican presidential primary candidate and U.S. representative for Minnesota's 6th congressional district from 2007 until 2015.
- Lauren Boebert, Republican U.S. representative for Colorado's 3rd congressional district
- Rafael Cruz, pastor and father of Republican U.S. Senator Ted Cruz of Texas
- Mike Johnson, Republican U.S. representative for Louisiana's 4th congressional district and Speaker of the House
- Charlie Kirk, political activist and commentator
- Tom Parker, Former Chief Justice of the Alabama Supreme Court
- Paula White, spiritual advisor to Donald Trump
- Andrew Wommack, evangelical leader

== Criticism ==
In 2018, Richard Tanksley and Marlin Schaich argued that primary aspects of the Seven Mountain Mandate are "nearly identical to the ideological state apparatuses (ISAs) developed by Louis Althusser ... on the basis of the theories of Karl Marx ... Antonio Gramsci, and others".

== See also ==
- Christian nationalism
- Christian reconstructionism
- Christian supremacy
- Moral Majority
- Sociological classifications of religious movements
- Sphere sovereignty
- Republic of Gilead
