= Julio Chavezmontes =

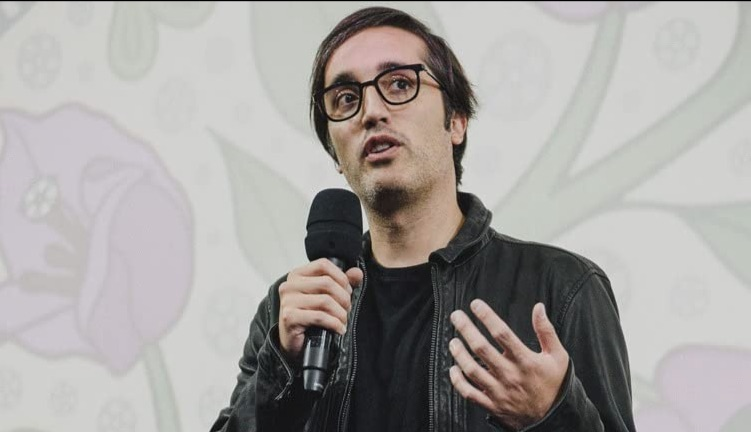
- Born: Julio Chavezmontes Jato Velandia; 1983 (age 42–43); México
- Occupations: Filmmaker, Producer, Writer

Julio Chavezmontes is a Mexican producer and screenwriter who was winner of the Best Screenplay award at the Sundance Film Festival in 2018 and twice nominated for the AMACC Ariel Award. He has produced more than 20 films, many of which have been screened at the world's leading film festivals, including Sundance, Berlin, Cannes, Venice, and Toronto, among others. His productions have received multiple accolades, most recently the Best Director Award (“Annette”) and the Jury Prize (“Memoria”) at the 2021 Cannes Film Festival.

He has produced or co-produced films by filmmakers such as Apichatpong Weerasethakul, Leos Carax, Abel Ferrara, Mia Hansen-Love, Ruben Östlund, Lucrecia Martel and Yann Gonzalez, as well as Mexican directors Sebastián Hofmann, Emiliano Rocha Minter, Nicolás Echevarría and Eugenio Polgovsky, among others.

In 2011, he founded PIANO with Sebastián Hofmann, one of the leading art film production houses in Mexico and Latin America. Since its inception in 2011, PIANO has been a platform for original and risky projects.

His first feature film, "Halley" (2012), had its national premiere at the Morelia Film Festival and its international premiere at the Sundance Film Festival in 2013, and was supported by the Hubert Bals Fund and Foprocine.

Notable productions: Halley (2012), Echo of the Mountain (2014), We Are the Flesh (2016), Time Share (2018), The Accused (2018), Knife + Heart (2018), Siberia (2020), The Fugitive (2020), Annette (2021), Memoria (2021), Bergman Island (2021).

== Career ==
=== 2011 - Present: Notable Productions ===
Julio Chavezmontes began his career co-writing and producing "Halley", directed by Sebastian Hofmann, and co-produced by Mantarraya Producciones, the production company responsible for launching the careers of celebrated Mexican directors Carlos Reygadas and Amat Escalante. The film was sold to Sundance / AMC Channel following its premiere in the New Frontier section of the Sundance Film Festival, and was invited to over 50 international film festivals, including the prestigious Hivos Tiger Award Competition at IFF Rotterdam. In total, "Halley" won 8 awards, including the Sitges New Visions Award, the Cinevision Award in Munich, the AQCC Award and the Special Jury Mention at Fantasia Film Festival.

"Halley" was praised by Screen International, Rolling Stone Mexico, Indiewire, Letras Libres and Ion Cinema among others. Cultura Colectiva praised the film as one of the 20 best Mexican cult films of the last 25 years, and it was hailed by Chilango as one of the best new horror films in Mexico.

Other notable productions include Nicolás Echevarría's "Echo of the Mountain" and Emiliano Rocha Minter's debut "We Are the Flesh", which had the public support of Carlos Reygadas, Alejandro González Iñárritu and Alfonso Cuarón. After its commercial release in the United States, "We Are the Flesh" was praised by Village Voice, Slant Magazine, Los Angeles Times and SF Weekly, among others.

Julio Chavezmontes and Sebastián Hofmann co-wrote "Time Share", the sequel to "Halley", which was produced by Chavezmontes and directed by Hofmann. The film was supported by Hubert Bals Fund, Cinemart, Netherlands Film Fund and EFICINE.

=== 2014 - Present: Distribution ===
In 2014, Julio Chavezmontes partnered with Andrea Castex to launch distribution operations in Mexico, with a focus on auteur films. Since then, the company has released Inori, Death in Arizona, Sand Dollars, The Dead, Tropical Carmin, All of Me, Eisenstein in Guanajuato, The Pleasure is Mine, Epitaph, We Are the Flesh and The Darkness. In 2017, PIANO announced an expansion of its acquisition strategy to foreign titles with the purchase of 2017 Palme d'Or winner The Square and Rungano Nyoni's feature debut, I Am Not a Witch.

PIANO also launched for sale an auteur film collection on DVD and Blu-ray that so far includes three editions of Mexican cult films (Halley, Alamar-Inori and Duck Season), meticulously designed to offer a collector's product to its audience.

=== 2018 - Present ===
In 2018, he won Best Screenplay Prize at the Sundance Film Festival for "Time Share", and was also nominated for the Silver Ariel Award for Best Screenplay and the Golden Ariel Award for Best Film.

In 2018, he became the first Mexican producer to premiere films in the official selection at Sundance, Berlin, Cannes, Venice and Toronto in the same year. The film "Time Share", received the award for Best Screenplay in the international competition at the Sundance Film Festival, while "Knife + Heart" was nominated for the Palme d'Or at the Cannes Film Festival, and "The Accused" was nominated for the Golden Lion at the Venice Film Festival.

In 2020, he premiered the films "Siberia" by Abel Ferrara and "The Fugitive" by Natalia Meta in the official competition of the Berlin Film Festival.

In 2021, became the first Mexican producer to premiere three films in the Cannes Film Festival competition in the same year: "Annette" by Leos Carax, "Memoria" by Apichatpong Weerasethakul and "Bergman Island" by Mia Hansen-Løve. All three films were celebrated by international critics and included in multiple lists of Cannes Film Festival highlights. "Annette" received the Best Director award while "Memoria" received the Jury Prize.

=== Education ===
Julio Chavezmontes graduated with honors from the University of Chicago in 2005 and has an M.F.A. from the School of the Art Institute of Chicago.

== Filmography ==
- Halley (2012) - (Co-writer, producer)
- Kwaku Ananse (2013) - (Producer)
- Death in Arizona (2014) - (Producer)
- Echo of the Mountain (2014) - (Producer)
- We Are the Flesh (2016) - (Producer)
- Resurrection (2016) - (Producer)
- The Gaze of the Sea (2017) - (Producer)
- Opus Zero (2017) - (Producer)
- Time Share (2018) - (Co-writer, producer)
- Land (2018) - (Producer)
- The Accused (2018) – (Co- Producer)
- Knife+Heart (2018) – (Co- Producer)
- Love Me Not (2019) – (Producer)
- Siberia (2020) – (Producer)
- The Intruder (2020) – (Co- Producer)
- Annette (2021) – (Co- Producer)
- Pobo ‘tzu’ (2021) – (Producer)
- Memoria (2021) – (Producer)
- Bergman Island (2021) – (Co- Producer)
