= Directing Award Documentary =

Film award

This is a list of winners of the Sundance Film Festival Directing Award for documentary features.

== Winners ==
=== 1990s ===
- 1997: Arthur Dong – Licensed to Kill
- 1998: Julia Loktev – Moment of Impact
- 1999: Barbara Sonneborn – Regret to Inform

=== 2000s ===
- 2000: Rob Epstein and Jeffrey Friedman – Paragraph 175
- 2001: Stacy Peralta – Dogtown and Z-Boys
- 2002: Rebecca Cammisa and Rob Fruchtman – Sister Helen
- 2003: Jonathan Karsh – My Flesh and Blood
- 2004: Morgan Spurlock – Super Size Me
- 2005: Jeff Feuerzeig – The Devil and Daniel Johnston
- 2006: James Longley – Iraq in Fragments
- 2007: Sean Fine and Andrea Nix Fine – War/Dance
- 2008: Nanette Burstein – American Teen
- 2009: Natalia Almada – El General

=== 2010s ===
- 2010: Leon Gast – Smash His Camera
- 2011: Jon Foy – Resurrect Dead: The Mystery of the Toynbee Tiles
- 2012: Lauren Greenfield – The Queen of Versailles
- 2013: Zachary Heinzerling – Cutie and the Boxer
- 2014: Ben Cotner and Ryan White – The Case Against 8
- 2015: Matthew Heineman – Cartel Land
- 2016: Roger Ross Williams – Life, Animated
- 2017: Peter Nicks – The Force
- 2018: Alexandria Bombach – On Her Shoulders
- 2019: Steven Bognar and Julia Reichert – American Factory

=== 2020s ===
- 2020: Garrett Bradley – Time
- 2021: Natalia Almada – Users
- 2022: Reid Davenport – I Didn't See You There
- 2023: Luke Lorentzen – A Still Small Voice
- 2024: Julian Brave NoiseCat and Emily Kassie – Sugarcane
- 2025: Geeta Gandbhir – The Perfect Neighbor
- 2026: J.M. Harper – Soul Patrol

== See also ==
- Academy Award for Best Documentary Feature
