= Luke Lorentzen =

American director (born 1993)

- Born: 1993
- Occupations: Director, editor, cinematographer
- Years active: 2014–present

Luke Lorentzen (born 1993) is an American documentary filmmaker. Lorentzen has directed and served as cinematographer and editor on the feature films Midnight Family (2019), A Still Small Voice (2023) and Boatbuilders (2026). He also served as director and cinematographer on Last Chance U (2019) which won an Sports Emmy Outstanding Serialized Sports Documentary. He is the recipient of the Sundance Film Festival Directing Award Documentary.

== Early life ==
Lorentzen attended and graduated from Stanford University with a Bachelor of Arts in Film & Media Studies.

== Career ==
In 2014, Lorentzen directed the documentary short film Santa Cruz del Islote which had its world premiere at the Full Frame Documentary Film Festival. In 2015, Lorentzen directed the feature-length documentary New York Cuts revolving around six barbershops and hair salons throughout New York City. It had its world premiere at the International Documentary Film Festival Amsterdam.

In 2019, Lorentzen directed, shot, produced, and edited the documentary Midnight Family which follows a family running a private ambulance in Mexico City. It had its world premiere at the 2019 Sundance Film Festival where it received critical acclaim and received a Special Jury Award for Cinematography. It was released on December 6, 2019, by 1091 Media. It was shortlisted for the Academy Award for Best Documentary Feature Film at the 92nd Academy Awards. The film was the inspiration for the scripted 2024 Apple TV series of the same name, which Lorentzen served as an executive producer on.

That same year, Lorentzen produced and directed Last Chance U a documentary series for Netflix revolving around junior college football.

In 2023, Lorentzen directed, produced, shot, and edited A Still Small Voice which follows a chaplain completing a year-long residency at New York City's Mount Sinai Hospital. It had its world premiere at the 2023 Sundance Film Festival where it received critical acclaim, and won the Directing Award Documentary. It was listed as the National Board of Review's list of Top 5 Documentaries of 2023 and shortlisted for the Academy Award for Best Documentary Feature Film at the 96th Academy Awards.

In 2026, Lorentzen directed, produced, shot, and edited Boatbuilders revolving around 60 craftsmen building wooden boats at Brooklin Boat Yard in Maine. The film will had its world premiere out of competition at the 83rd Venice International Film Festival on September 7, 2026.
