= Mammoth Lakes Film Festival =

Californian indie film festival

Mammoth Lakes Film Ferstival
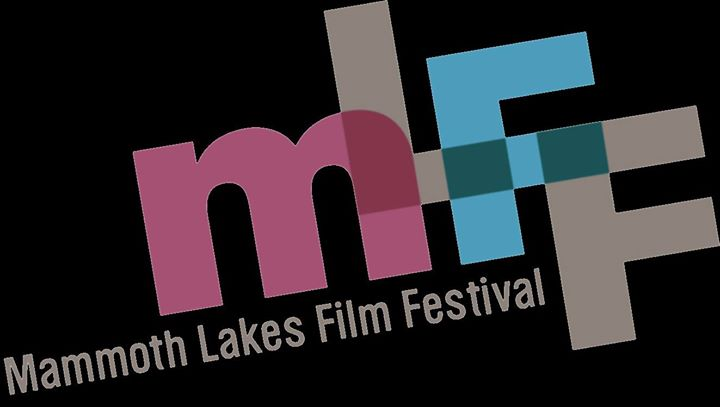
- Location: Mammoth Lakes, California, Mono County, California, Eastern Sierra
- Founded: 2015
- Founded by: Shira Dubrovner
- Festival date: Memorial Day Weekend
- Website: mammothlakesfilmfestival.com

The Mammoth Lakes Film Festival is a five-day film festival that screens independent features and shorts in Mammoth Lakes, California, a mountain resort town in the Eastern Sierra. The festival, founded by Shira Dubrovner in 2015 with Paul Sbrizzi as director of programming, takes place over Memorial Day weekend each year, and was named as one of the Top 50 Festivals Worth The Entry Fee by Moviemaker Magazine in 2016 and 2017.

== Festivals ==
=== 2015 ===
The 2015 Mammoth Lakes Film Festival was held May 27–30, 2015. The event opened with the film Steve Jobs: The Man in the Machine, and closed with Cartel Land. The Jury Judges were Andrew Lazar, Kristanna Loken, Larry Meistrich, Allison Amon, Yana Gorskaya, Kathleen Kinmont, Kimberley Browning, and Breven Angaelica Warren.

=== 2016 ===
The 2nd Annual Mammoth Lakes Film Festival was held May 25–29, 2016. The festival opened with the film Operation Avalanche (film). Joe Dante was presented with the Sierra Spirit Award. The festival Jury Judges were John Fiedler, Kelly Leow, John Wirth (television producer), Allison Amon, John Scheinfeld, Katherine Tulich, Bojana Sandic, and Amanda Salazar.

=== 2017 ===
The 3rd Annual Mammoth Lakes Film Festival was held May 24–28, 2017. The event opened with the film Up In Smoke, with actor Tommy Chong in-person for a question-and-answer panel following the screening. The Sierra Spirit Award was presented to John Sayles by Vincent Spano, following a screening of Baby It's You (film). The festival Jury Judges were Allison Amon, Judy Coppage, Devin Digonno, Zackary Gilyani, Jacques Thelemaque, Kelly Leow, Sandra Seeling Lipski, and Bobby Putka.

=== 2018 ===
The 4th Annual Mammoth Lakes Film Festival was held May 23–27, 2018. The festival opened with the film Damsel. The jury members were Allison Amon, Lindsey Bahr, Peter Baxter, Shalini Dore, Alonso Duralde, Timothy Rhys, Scenery Samundra, Ana Souza, Vincent Spano, Nicole Sperling, and Rachel Winter.

== Awards ==
=== 2015 ===
- Audience Award for Narrative Feature -- They Look Like People - IMDb
- Audience Award for Documentary -- Omo Child: The River and the Bush - IMDb
- Jury Award for Narrative Feature -- Diamond Tongues - IMDb
- Jury Award for Documentary Feature -- Autism In Love - IMDb
- Jury Special Mention Bravery Award -- Cartel Land - IMDB
- Jury Award for Narrative Short -- Una Nit - IMDb
- Jury Honorable Mention for Narrative Short -- Upon The Rock - IMDb
- Jury Award for Animation or Documentary Short -- Tourist Trap - IMDb
- Jury Honorable Mention for Animation or Documentary Short -- The Tide Keeper - IMDb

=== 2016 ===
- Audience Award for Feature Narrative -- Buddymoon - IMDb
- Audience Award for Feature Documentary -- Learning to See - IMDb
- Jury Award for Narrative Feature -- Bodkin Ras - IMDb
- Jury Award for Documentary Feature -- Sonita - IMDb
- Jury Bravery Award Feature Documentary -- Under the Sun - IMDb
- Jury Special Mention Feature Narrative -- Mad - IMDb
- Jury Award for Narrative Short -- A Night in Tokoriki - IMDb
- Jury Honorable Mention for Narrative Short -- Tisure - IMDb
- Jury Award for Animation or Documentary Short -- The Second Life
- Jury Honorable Mention for Animation or Documentary Short -- The Night Stalker (2015 film) - IMDb

=== 2017 ===
- Audience Award for Feature Narrative -- Withdrawn -
- International Narrative Feature Grand Jury Award -- Cold Breath -

IMDb

- Audience Award for Feature Documentary -- Strad Style - IMDb
- Jury Award for Narrative Feature -- Space Detective - IMDb
- Jury Award for Documentary Feature -- Strad Style - IMDb
- Jury Bravery Award Feature Documentary -- Forever B - IMDb
- Jury Special Mention Feature Narrative -- The Great Unwashed (film) - IMDb
- Jury Award for Narrative Short -- Flowereyes
- Jury Special Mention Narrative Short -- Call Your Father - IMDb
- Jury Special Mention Narrative Short -- Sadhu in Bombay - IMDb
- Jury Award for Documentary Short -- 52-The Trolleybus - IMDb
- Jury Award for Animated Short -- Little Red Giant, The Monster That I Was - IMDB
- Jury Special Mention Animated Short -- Adam - IMDb

=== 2018 ===
- Jury Award for Best Narrative Feature -- My Name Is Myeisha
- Audience Award for Best Narrative Feature -- Rock Steady Row
- Jury Award for Best Documentary Feature -- White Tide: The Legend of Culebra
- Audience Award for Best Documentary Feature -- Crime + Punishment
- Bravery Award -- Minding the Gap
- Honorable Mention for Documentary Feature -- Buddha.mov - IMDb
- Jury Award for Best International Feature -- Tower. A Bright Day
- Jury Award for Best Narrative Short -- Shadow Animals
- Jury Award for Best Documentary Short -- David & The Kingdom
- Jury Award for Best Animated Short -- Cocoon, Cocoon
- Honorable Mention for Narrative Short -- Babies
- Honorable Mention for Narrative Short -- In a Month
- Honorable Mention for Animation Short -- Nevada

=== 2019 ===
- Jury Award for Best Narrative Feature -- A Great Lamp
- Audience Award for Best Narrative Feature -- No Exit
- Jury Award for North American Documentary Feature -- 17 Blocks
- Jury Award for International Documentary Feature -- Clean Hands
- Audience Award for Best Documentary Feature -- Juan
- Bravery Award -- Midnight Family
- Special Mention for Documentary Feature -- Juan
- Jury Award for Best International Feature -- Cat Sticks
- Jury Award for Best Narrative Short -- Molly's Single
- Jury Award for Best Documentary Short -- The Clinic
- Jury Award for Best Animated Short -- Dani
- Special Mention for Narrative Short -- Enough Is Enough
- Special Mention for Narrative Short -- Diva & Astro

=== 2020 ===
- Jury Award for Best Narrative Feature -- Residue
- Audience Award for Best Narrative Feature -- Desire Path
- Jury Award for Documentary Feature -- Feather & Pine
- Audience Award for Best Documentary Feature -- The Wind. A Documentary Thriller
- Jury Bravery Award for Documentary Feature -- Pier Kids
- Honorable Mention for Narrative Feature -- Marlene
- Honorable Mention for Documentary Feature -- Democracy on the Road of Saveh
- Jury Award for Best Narrative Short -- Follow Me
- Jury Award for Best Documentary Short -- Huntsville Station
- Jury Award for Best Animated Short -- The Fourfold
- Honorable Mention for Narrative Short -- They Won't Last
- Honorable Mention for Animated Short -- Cage Match
- Jury Award for Best Screenplay -- Fish Story

=== 2021 ===
- Jury Award for Best Narrative Feature -- Ultrasound
- Audience Award for Best Narrative Feature -- Social
- Jury Award for Documentary Feature -- Larry Flynt for President
- Audience Award for Best Documentary Feature -- Larry Flynt for President
- Jury Bravery Award for Documentary Feature -- Fearless
- Honorable Mention for Narrative Feature -- What Josiah Saw
- Jury Award for Best International Narrative Feature -- Isaac
- Audience Award for Best International Narrative Feature -- Isaac
- Jury Award for Best International Documentary Feature -- The Renegades
- Audience Award for Best International Documentary Feature -- Beautiful Idiots
- Honorable Mention for International Documentary Feature -- Everyone Wants to be the Next Weismann
- Jury Award for Best Narrative Short -- Manaus Hot City
- Jury Award for Best Documentary Short -- A Man in Chain
- Jury Award for Best Animation Short -- Human Nature
- Honorable Mention for Narrative Short -- Progressive Touch
- Honorable Mention for Narrative Short -- Devek
- Honorable Mention for Narrative Short -- Khaki is not Leather
- Honorable Mention for Documentary Short -- Vagalumes
- Honorable Mention for Animation Short -- Millennial Prince
- Jury Award for Best Music Video -- Tirzah - Sink In
- Honorable Mention for Music Video -- Rone - Room With a View
- Honorable Mention for Music Video -- Satomimagae - Houkou
- Jury Award for Best Screenplay -- Mr. Cool

=== 2022 ===
- Jury Award for Best North American Narrative Feature -- The Civil Dead - IMDB
- Audience Award for Best North American Narrative Feature -- Kickin Knowledge
- Jury Award for Best North American Documentary Feature -- A Woman on the Outside
- Audience Award for Best North American Documentary Feature -- The Pez Outlaw
- Jury Award for Best International Narrative Feature -- Tel Aviv
- Audience Award for Best International Narrative Feature -- Tel Aviv
- Jury Award for Best International Documentary Feature -- Eternal Spring
- Audience Award for Best International Documentary Feature -- Eternal Spring
- Jury Bravery Award for Documentary Feature -- Little Palestine: Diary of a Siege
- Honorable Mention for Bravery Award -- The Quiet Epidemic
- Honorable Mention for Narrative Feature -- The Noise of Engines
- Honorable Mention for Narrative Feature -- Actual People
- Honorable Mention for International Narrative Feature -- Zeria
- Honorable Mention for International Narrative Feature -- Jhilli
- Jury Award for Best North American Narrative Short -- Birds
- Jury Award for Best International Narrative Short -- Be Somebody
- Jury Award for Best Documentary Short -- Ali and His Miracle Sheep
- Jury Award for Best Animated Short -- The Fourth Wall
- Honorable Mention for Narrative Short -- From Water Comes Melon
- Honorable Mention for International Narrative Short -- Colony Collapse Disorder
- Honorable Mention for Documentary Short -- Kak Iraj
- Honorable Mention for Documentary Short -- The Doll
- Honorable Mention for Animated Short -- Zoon
- Honorable Mention for Animated Short -- Conversations with a Whale
- Jury Award for Best Music Video -- Little Simz feat. Obongjayar - Point and Kill
- Jury Award for Best Screenplay -- Saw the Forest

=== 2023 ===
- Jury Award for Best US Narrative Feature -- Unicorn Boy
- Audience Award for Best US Narrative Feature -- Love Dump
- Jury Award for Best US Documentary Feature – A Still Small Voice
- Audience Award for Best North American Documentary Feature -- Name of the Game
- Jury Award for Best International Narrative Feature -- Where the Road Leads
- Audience Award for Best International Narrative Feature -- Where the Road Leads
- Jury Award for Best International Documentary Feature -- To Kill a Tiger
- Audience Award for Best International Documentary Feature -- Naked Israel (2023 film)
- Jury Bravery Award for Documentary Feature -- Mississippi River Styx
- Honorable Mention for Narrative Feature -- Love Dump
- Jury Award for Best Narrative Short -- Play this at My Funeral
- Jury Award for Best International Narrative Short -- Sanaa, Seductress of Strangers
- Jury Award for Best Documentary Short -- A Throwing Forth
- Jury Award for Best Animated Short -- Our Pain
- Honorable Mention for Narrative Short -- Filling Holes
- Honorable Mention for International Narrative Short -- Summer Rain
- Honorable Mention for Documentary Short -- Let Me Take You Home
- Honorable Mention for Animated Short -- The Last Story
- Jury Award for Best Music Video -- Goat - Under No Nation
- Honorable Mention for Music Video -- Osees - Funeral Solution
- Honorable Mention for Music Video -- Altin Gün - Rakiya Su Katamam
- Jury Award for Best Screenplay -- Field of Weeds

=== 2024 ===
- Jury Award for Best US Narrative Feature -- Atikamekw Suns
- Audience Award for Best US Narrative Feature -- All I've Got and Then Some
- Jury Award for Best US Documentary Feature – Mediha
- Audience Award for Best North American Documentary Feature -- Mediha
- Jury Award for Best International Narrative Feature -- The Complex Forms
- Audience Award for Best International Narrative Feature -- The Complex Forms
- Jury Bravery Award for Documentary Feature -- Inheritance
- Honorable Mention for Narrative Feature -- All I've Got and Then Some
- Jury Award for Best Narrative Short -- Night Milk
- Jury Award for Best International Narrative Short -- Ciela
- Jury Award for Best Documentary Short -- #WAY_Aurelio
- Jury Award for Best Animated Short -- Acid Green
- Honorable Mention for Narrative Short -- Deepfake Apology Video
- Honorable Mention for International Narrative Short -- Tidy House
- Honorable Mention for International Narrative Short -- Mirage
- Honorable Mention for Documentary Short -- Voices
- Honorable Mention for Animated Short -- Nohomo
- Jury Award for Best Music Video -- Puma Blue - Hounds
- Jury Award for Best Screenplay -- Love in the Time of Recycling
