= 2003 Sundance Film Festival =

2003 film festival edition

- Festival poster
- Location: Park City, Salt Lake City, Ogden, and Sundance, Utah
- Hosted by: Sundance Institute
- Festival date: January 16–26, 2003
- Website: festival.sundance.org/2003
- 2004 Sundance Film Festival 2002 Sundance Film Festival

The 2003 Sundance Film Festival took place from January 16 to January 26, 2003.

== Background ==
American Splendor, a biopic of comic-book author Harvey Pekar, won the Dramatic Grand Jury Prize while Capturing the Friedmans, a documentary about David Friedman and his family's dark secret, won the Documentary Grand Jury Prize. Other prize-winning films included The Station Agent and Thirteen. Steve Zahn and Maggie Gyllenhaal presented the awards in a ceremony televised live on the Sundance Channel.

Unseasonably warm weather attracted record numbers of attendees, among them musician Bob Dylan.

== Films ==
Film name - English	Film name - Non-English	Directed By	Written By	Category	Awards
28 Days Later		Danny Boyle	Alex Garland	World Cinema	
All the Real Girls		David Gordon Green	David Gordon Green	Dramatic Competition	Special Jury Prize for Acting, Special Jury Prize for Emotional Truth
American Splendor		Shari Springer Berman and Robert Pulcini	Shari Springer Berman, Robert Pulcini	Dramatic Competition	Grand Jury Prize: Dramatic
Angela		Roberta Torre			
Bend It Like Beckham		Gurinder Chadha			
Benjamin		Monique Gardenberg			
Born Rich					
Camp		Todd Graff	Todd Graff	Dramatic Competition	
Capturing the Friedmans		Andrew Jarecki		Documentary Competition	Grand Jury Prize: Documentary
Civil Brand		Neema Barnette			
Comandante		Oliver Stone		Premieres	
Confidence		James Foley	Doug Jung	Premieres	
Death of Klinghoffer		Penny Woolcock			
Die, Mommie, Die!		Mark Rucker	Charles Busch	Premieres	Special Jury Prize for Acting
Dopamine		Mark Decena	Mark Decena, Timothy Breitbach	Dramatic Competition	Alfred P. Sloan Prize
Dot the i	El punto sobre la i	Matthew Parkhill	Matthew Parkhill	Premieres	
Dysfunktional Family		George Gallo	Eddie Griffin	Park City at Midnight	
The Event		Thom Fitzgerald	Thom Fitzgerald, Steven Hillyer, Tim Marback	Premieres	
Fear X		Nicolas Winding Refn	Hubert Selby Jr., Nicolas Winding Refn	World Cinema	
Garage Days		Alex Proyas		Premieres	
Girls Will Be Girls		Richard Day	Richard Day	Park City at Midnight	
Good Fences		Ernest Dickerson	Trey Ellis		
The Hebrew Hammer		Jonathan Kesselman	Jonathan Kesselman	Park City at Midnight	
In America		Jim Sheridan	Jim Sheridan, Naomi Sheridan, Kirsten Sheridan	Premieres	
Irreversible	Irréversible	Gaspar Noé	Gaspar Noé	Frontier	
It's All About Love		Thomas Vinterberg	Thomas Vinterberg, Mogens Rukov	Premieres	
Laurel Canyon		Lisa Cholodenko	Lisa Cholodenko	American Showcase	
Levity		Ed Solomon	Ed Solomon	Premieres	
Long Life, Happiness & Prosperity		Mina Shum			
The Maldonado Miracle		Salma Hayek			
Masked and Anonymous		Larry Charles	Larry Charles, Bob Dylan	Premieres	
Nightstalker		Chris Fisher	Chris Fisher	Park City at Midnight	
Normal		Jane Anderson	Jane Anderson	American Showcase	
Northfork		Michael Polish	Mark Polish, Michael Polish	Premieres	
Off the Map		Campbell Scott	Joan Ackermann	Premieres	
Open Hearts	Elsker dig for evigt	Susanne Bier	Anders Thomas Jensen	World Cinema	
Owning Mahowny		Richard Kwietniowski	Maurice Chauvet	Premieres	
Party Monster		Fenton Bailey, Randy Barbato	Fenton Bailey, Randy Barbato	Dramatic Competition	
People I Know		Daniel Algrant	Jon Robin Baitz	Premieres	
Pieces of April		Peter Hedges	Peter Hedges	Dramatic Competition	Special Jury Prize for Acting
Rolling Kansas		Thomas Haden Church	Thomas Haden Church, Robin Denney	Park City at Midnight	
The Secret Lives of Dentists		Alan Rudolph	Craig Lucas	Premieres	
The Shape of Things		Neil LaBute	Neil LaBute	Premieres	
The Singing Detective		Keith Gordon	Dennis Potter	Premieres	
Soldier's Girl		Frank Pierson	Ron Nyswaner	Premieres	
Song for a Raggy Boy		Aisling Walsh			
Spun		Jonas Åkerlund	William De Los Santos, Creighton Vero	Park City at Midnight	
The Station Agent		Tom McCarthy	Tom McCarthy	Dramatic Competition	Audience Award: Dramatic, Waldo Salt Screenwriting Award, Special Jury Prize for Acting
Stoked: The Rise and Fall of Gator		Helen Stickler	Helen Stickler	Park City at Midnight	
Thirteen		Catherine Hardwicke	Catherine Hardwicke, Nikki Reed	Dramatic Competition	Directing Award: Dramatic
Toy					
Tupac: Resurrection		Lauren Lazin			
The United States of Leland					
Whale Rider		Niki Caro	Niki Caro	World Cinema	Audience Award: World Cinema
What Alice Found		A. Dean Bell	A. Dean Bell	Dramatic Competition	Special Jury Prize for Emotional Truth

== Awards ==
- Grand Jury Prize: Documentary – Capturing the Friedmans
- Grand Jury Prize: Dramatic – American Splendor
- Audience Award: Documentary – My Flesh and Blood
- Audience Award: Dramatic – The Station Agent
- Special Jury Prize for Emotional Truth – All the Real Girls
- Special Jury Prize for Emotional Truth – What Alice Found
- Special Jury Prize for Performance – Patricia Clarkson, The Station Agent; Pieces of April; All the Real Girls
- Special Jury Prize for Performance – Charles Busch, Die, Mommie, Die!
- Documentary Directing Award – Jonathan Karsh, My Flesh and Blood
- Dramatic Directing Award – Catherine Hardwicke, Thirteen
- Waldo Salt Screenwriting Award: U.S. Dramatic – Tom McCarthy, The Station Agent
- Excellence in Cinematography Award: Documentary – Dana Kupper, Gordon Quinn, and Peter Gilbert, Stevie
- Excellence in Cinematography Award: Dramatic – Quattro Noza
- The Freedom of Expression Award went to What I Want My Words to Do to You
- Special Jury Prize for Documentary – The Murder of Emmett Till
- Special Jury Prize for Documentary – A Certain Kind of Death
