= What Alice Found =

American award-winning feature film

- Directed by: A. Dean Bell
- Written by: A. Dean Bell
- Produced by: Richard Connors
- Starring: Emily Grace; Judith Ivey; Bill Raymond; Jane Lincoln Taylor; Justin Parkinson
- Cinematography: Richard Connors
- Edited by: Chris Houghton
- Production company: What Alice Found Productions LLC
- Distributed by: Castle Hill Productions
- Release date: 2003
- Running time: 96 minutes
- Country: United States
- Language: English
- Box office: $66,988 (US)

What Alice Found is a 2003 American drama film directed by A. Dean Bell. It is A. Dean Bell's second feature film.

== Plot ==
The film is a coming of age story about a young woman who flees her poor New Hampshire hometown life to follow her friend to college in Florida. Her car breaks down on the highway, and a middle-aged couple in an RV offer to take her to Florida. Alice then discovers that they pay for their nomadic lifestyle through prostitution at truck stops and is led into their world.

== Cast ==
- Emily Grace as Alice
- Judith Ivey as Sandra
- Bill Raymond as Bill
- Jane Lincoln Taylor as Sally
- Justin Parkinson as Sam
- Katheryn Winnick as Julie
- Lucas Papaelias as Alex
- Michael C. Maronna as Alice's Boyfriend
- John Knox as Trooper
- Tim Hayes as Danny
- Tom Tumminello as Pete
- David Rose as Rough Trucker
- Clint Jordan as Lot Trucker
- Rita Fredricks as Judge
- Mathew Campbell as Counter Clerk
- Laura Poe as Julie's Mom
- Greg Jackson as Irv
- Lisa Balkun as Young Alice
- Brian de Benedictis as John at the Bar

== Release ==
The film was released in theaters in the United States in 2003. It made a total of $66,988 at the box office, with $6,720 being made its opening weekend. It was released on home video in the United States in 2004.

== Reception ==
What Alice Found has a 68% critics' score on review aggregator website Rotten Tomatoes. It was selected by The New York Times' Stephen Holden as a "Critic's Pick", and was praised by Kevin Thomas in the Los Angeles Times: "Sweet, suspenseful, funny, poignant -- and adult." Todd McCarthy of Variety describes the film as: "a solid character piece that deftly probes the complicity of both sides in a morally dubious relationship."

== Honors and awards ==
- 2003 Sundance Film Festival—Special Jury Award
- 2003 Deauville France Festival—Grand Prize
- 2003 Cinema Paradiso Festival (Hawai'i) -- Best Feature Film
- 2003 Tribeca Film Festival—Official Selection
- 2003 Stockholm Film Festival—Official Selection
- 2003 Mill Valley Film Festival—Official Selection
- Bangkok Film Festival—Official Selection
