= Boatbuilders =

2026 American documentary film

- Directed by: Luke Lorentzen
- Produced by: Kellen Quinn; Luke Lorentzen
- Cinematography: Luke Lorentzen
- Edited by: Luke Lorentzen
- Production companies: Hedgehog Films; Spark Features; Merino Films
- Release date: September 7, 2026 (Venice)
- Running time: 103 minutes
- Country: United States
- Language: English

Boatbuilders is a 2026 American documentary film directed, shot, produced, and edited by Luke Lorentzen. It follows 60 skilled craftsmen over the course of four seasons as they build a 56-foot sailboat at Brooklin Boat Yard in Brooklin, Maine.

The film had its world premiere out of competition at the 83rd Venice International Film Festival on September 7, 2026.

== Premise ==
Follows 60 skilled craftsmen over the course of four seasons as they build a 56-foot sailboat at Brooklin Boat Yard in Maine. Amongst the boatbuilders, the camera focuses on one of the bosses of the boat yard, Brian Larkin and project manager Trent Glisson as they idiosyncratically construct “the Kiandra” for their millionaire client, Graham Green.

== Release ==
It had its world premiere out of competition at the 83rd Venice International Film Festival on September 7, 2026. It will also screen at the Camden International Film Festival on September 17, 2026.
