= Natalia Almada =

Mexican-American photographer and filmmaker

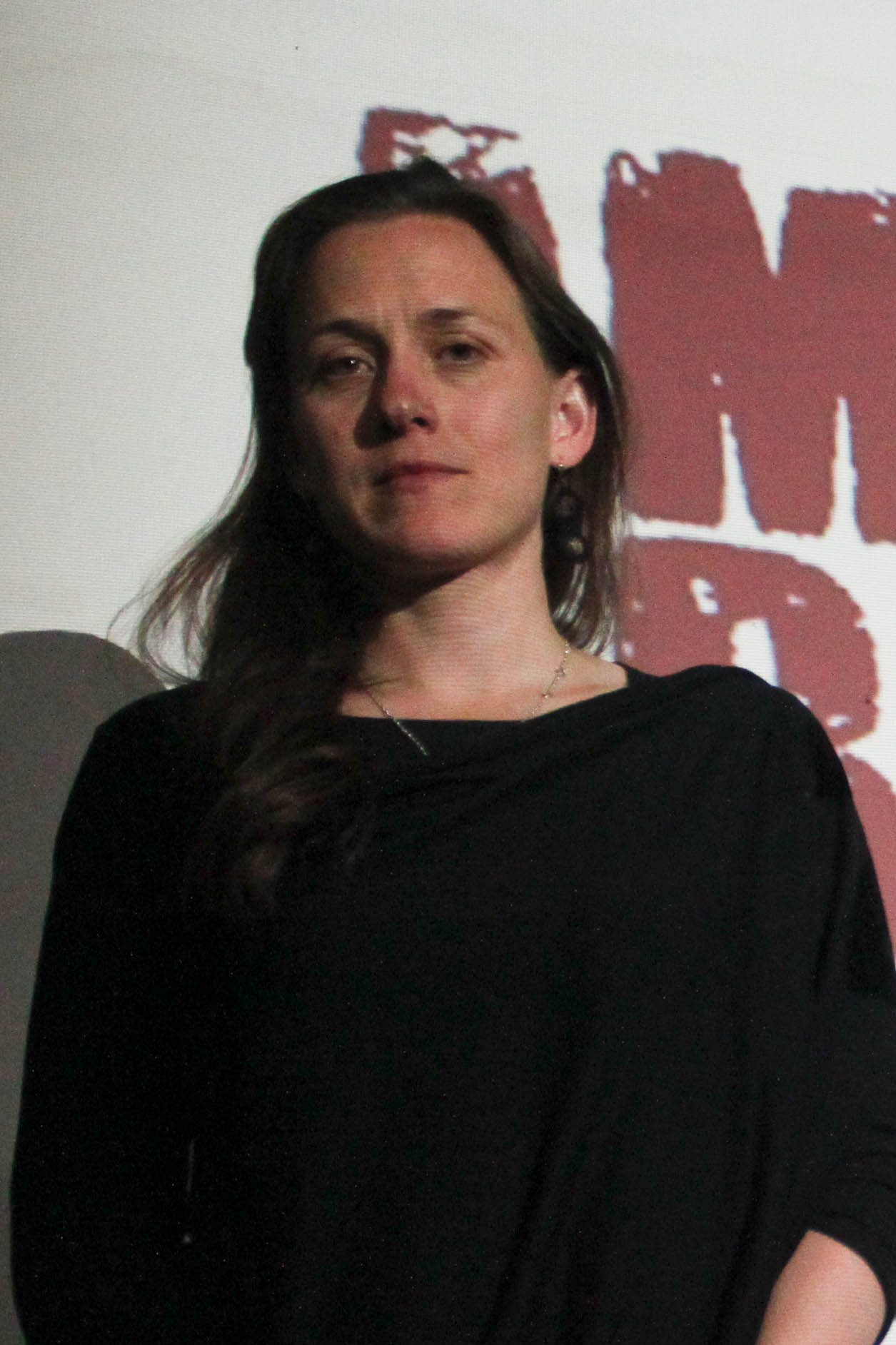
- Born: Sinaloa, Mexico
- Education: Rhode Island School of Design
- Known for: photographer; filmmaker
- Style: Documentary
- Awards: 2009 Sundance Film Festival Directing Award Documentary; 2012 MacArthur Fellows Program

Natalia Almada is a Mexican-American photographer and filmmaker. Her work as a filmmaker focuses on Mexican history, politics, and culture in insightful and poetic films that push the boundaries of how the documentary form addresses social issues. Her films include "Everything Else (Todo lo demás)" (2016), El Velador (2011), El General (2009), All Water Has a Perfect Memory (2001), and Al Otro Lado (2005), and her work has appeared at numerous national and international venues, including the Museum of Modern Art, the Sundance Film Festival, the Guggenheim Museum, the Munich International Film Festival, and the Cannes Directors' Fortnight. She won the 2009 Sundance Directing Award Documentary for her film El General. She is a 2012 MacArthur Fellow and the first Latina filmmaker to win the award.

== Early life and education ==
Natalia Almada was born and raised in Sinaloa, and later moved to Chicago alongside her Mexican father and American mother. Almada is the great-granddaughter of Plutarco Elías Calles, the very controversial former President of Mexico, who would eventually serve as the subject of one of her films (El General). Since the age of 12, she has been interested in capturing people's lives and stories through a camera, which is what eventually lead her to want to pursue a career in film.

Almada received her Bachelor of Fine Arts at the College of Santa Fe (1995), and continued her studies at the Rhode Island School of Design with a full scholarship, where she received her Master's in Photography (MFA, 2001).

Almada's inspiration comes from her positionality as a dual citizen, who grew up in two entirely opposing economic, social, and political settings, moving back and forth seasonally between Mexico and the United States. Her outlook as a Mexican-American female invites a wide range of audiences to understand social justice issues from a unique perspective in which the director is able to relate to the people in her films from an unbiased viewpoint. Almada eliminates the criminality from issues such as dictatorship and drug trafficking by looking at the issues from a lens focused on basic human needs, and the economic and political barriers that interfere.

Her films are largely influenced by her Mexican heritage, and the stories that have come to her from her experiences living in Sinaloa, as well as the stories told to her by her family. Almada's documentaries are non-linear, and are made by her directly inserting herself into scenarios so that she is able to get a first-hand perspective of the stories that she is portraying to her audience.

All of her films are deeply intimate and personal; Almada's theme of vulnerability produces a level of honesty that is needed to fully appreciate the stories she tells. The themes she explores relate to her familial history, and its connection to the corrupt conditions of modern day Sinaloa. Drug trafficking, illegal immigration, violence, loss, and Narco-capitalism are a but a few of the main topics explored in her films.

== Filmography ==
=== El Velador (The Night Watchman) (2011) ===
El Velador follows Martin, the night watchman of a Mexican Mausoleum, in order to tell a story about the intensifying drug problem in Mexico. The cemetery Martin watches over holds the bodies of Mexico's most infamous drug lords, whose deaths symbolize the danger involved in trafficking for all parties involved. The film follows a theme of violence, without any graphic or violent images present in order to tell the story of the growing issues created by Narco-capitalism, while still respecting the film's somber setting of the a cemetery. A correlation can be seen between the expansion of the drug war and the growing extravagance and quantity of Mausoleums in Martin's view; "the 'progress' of the cemetery mirrored the violence that was spiraling out of control." The film is slow, and hosts minimal dialogue in order to respect the place of mourning, and also to provide the audience with a quiet place for thought and contemplation on the issues brought to light by Almada.

=== El General (2009) ===
El General tells the story of Almada's great-grandfather, Plutarco Elías Calles, from the perspective of her grandmother. As an extremely controversial political leader, Calles' reputation in the public eye has him remembered as a dictator. The film moves back and forth between the past and present, and tells the story of Calles from his daughter's perspective, and from the way he is painted in history. The documentary is made up of voice-recordings of Almada's grandmother, who originally took the recordings with the hopes of writing a book. The film provides a unique perspective into Almada's ancestry and the way it interacts with both historical and present day Mexico. El General explores an ambiguity between history and memory, and the ways in which Almada's grandmother balances her personal memories with those of the public. Natalia received a Creative Capital Award to develop the film in 2005.

=== Al Otro Lado (2005) ===
Al otro lado focuses on drug trafficking and illegal migration between Mexico and the United States. The story is juxtaposed with traditional Mexican corrido music, which has historically been used for narrative purposes, however in this case, the upbeat music is used in irony to the topics captured on film. Almada tells the story from an economic standpoint, and follows the life of a young Mexican worker to bring light to the economic circumstances that often lead Mexican citizens to resort to drug trafficking and illegal migration in order to achieve a better life. In giving a face to the persistently growing problem, Almada adds a human perspective to a story that is typically told through a political, criminal lens. Al Otro Lado is Almada's first feature-length film.

=== All Water has a Perfect Memory (2001) ===
This film tells the very personal story of the passing of Almada's older sister, Ana Lynn, who drowned when the filmmaker was only three-months old. The film's main focus it to look at the ways in which her bicultural family responds to the tragedy and loss of Ana Lynn, and directly interviews those affected by her death. All Water deconstructs the ways in which Almada's American mother and Mexican father respond to the tragedy differently, and the ways in which gender and nationality contribute to this. The film is inspired by an essay by Toni Morrison, which focuses on the relationship between water and memory, which relates both symbolically and directly to the death of Ana Lynn. All Water has a Perfect Memory is an experimental documentary, and first of Almada's films to be publicized.

== Awards ==
- 2012 – MacArthur Fellow
- 2011 – Alpert Award
- 2010 – USA Artist Fellow
- 2009 – Sundance Directing Award Documentary
- 2008 – Guggenheim Fellow
- 2005 – Creative Capital Award

== Reception and reviews ==
	Rotten Tomatoes	IMDb	Metacritic
El Velador (2011)	89%	6.6/10	82%
El General (2009)	–	7.4/10	–
Al Otro Lado (2005)	75%	7/10	66%
All Water has a Perfect Memory (2001)	–	6.9/10	–
