= Jonathan Karsh =

American film director

- Born: Jonathan Shawn Karsh; October 16, 1971 (age 53); Sacramento, California, U.S.
- Occupation(s): director, producer
- Years active: 1993–present
- Children: 1 daughter

Jonathan Shawn Karsh (born October 16, 1971) is an American film director, producer, and former television host.

== Career ==
Karsh was the winner of the Audience Award Documentary and the Directing Award Documentary at the 2003 Sundance Film Festival for his directorial debut, the documentary My Flesh and Blood, which aired on HBO in 2004. The film went on to win the Emmy Award for Best Documentary, and the top awards at the Amsterdam International Film Festival and Febiofest.

Karsh later made documentary films for MTV and AMC, and produced reality shows for CBS, ABC, and ABC family.

Karsh was the host of Kid Nation, a controversial reality show that aired on CBS in 2007.
