= Cold Breath =

2017 Iranian film by Abbas Raziji

- Directed by: Abbas Raziji
- Written by: Abbas Raziji
- Produced by: Abbas Raziji
- Starring: Bita Badran; Nader Naderpoor; Majid Mozaffari
- Release dates: March 27, 2017 (Atlanta Film and Video Festival)
- Country: Iran
- Language: Persian

Cold Breath is a 2017 film by Abbas Raziji. This movie was placed among 2017's ten best movies by the New Orleans Film Society.

== Plot ==
Maryam is in her thirties. The one who is born as a girl, passed puberty like a boy, and in the way of subsistence tried hard every day just like a man...

== Cast ==
- Bita Badran as Maryam
- Nader Naderpoor as Ghasem
- Parichehr Riali as Nasrin
- Majid Mozaffari as Dr. Mansour
- Yasin Rasouli as Reza
- Kimia Mollaee as Raha
- Ezzatollah Ramezanifar as baba Rahim

== Release and reception ==
Cold Breath was screened at the competition section of the 41st annual Atlanta Film Festival. It was also screened at the London Independent Film Festival. It went on to win Best Narrative Feature at the Ridgefield Independent Film Festival, the Jury Award for Feature Narrative at the Mammoth Lakes Film Festival, and the Best Narrative Feature at the Calcutta International Cult Film Festival. Bita Badran was awarded Best Actress at the Salento International Film Festival. Abbas Raziji won the best director award from AOF film festival. This movie was placed among 2017's ten best movies by the New Orleans Film Society.
