= National Board of Review Awards 2023 =

American film awards

95th NBR Awards
- Date: December 6, 2023; January 11, 2024 (ceremony)
- Location: Cipriani 42nd Street, New York City
- Hosted by: Willie Geist

Highlights
- Best Film: Killers of the Flower Moon

The 95th National Board of Review Awards, honoring the best in film for 2023, were announced on December 6, 2023. Martin Scorsese's Killers of the Flower Moon won Best Film and received the most wins with four, including Best Director and Best Actress.

This year, the National Board of Review established a new category, titled "Outstanding Achievement in Stunt Artistry", which was created "to celebrate the accomplishments and work of stunt artists".

The annual awards gala was held on January 11, 2024, at Cipriani 42nd Street in New York City, hosted by television personality and journalist Willie Geist.

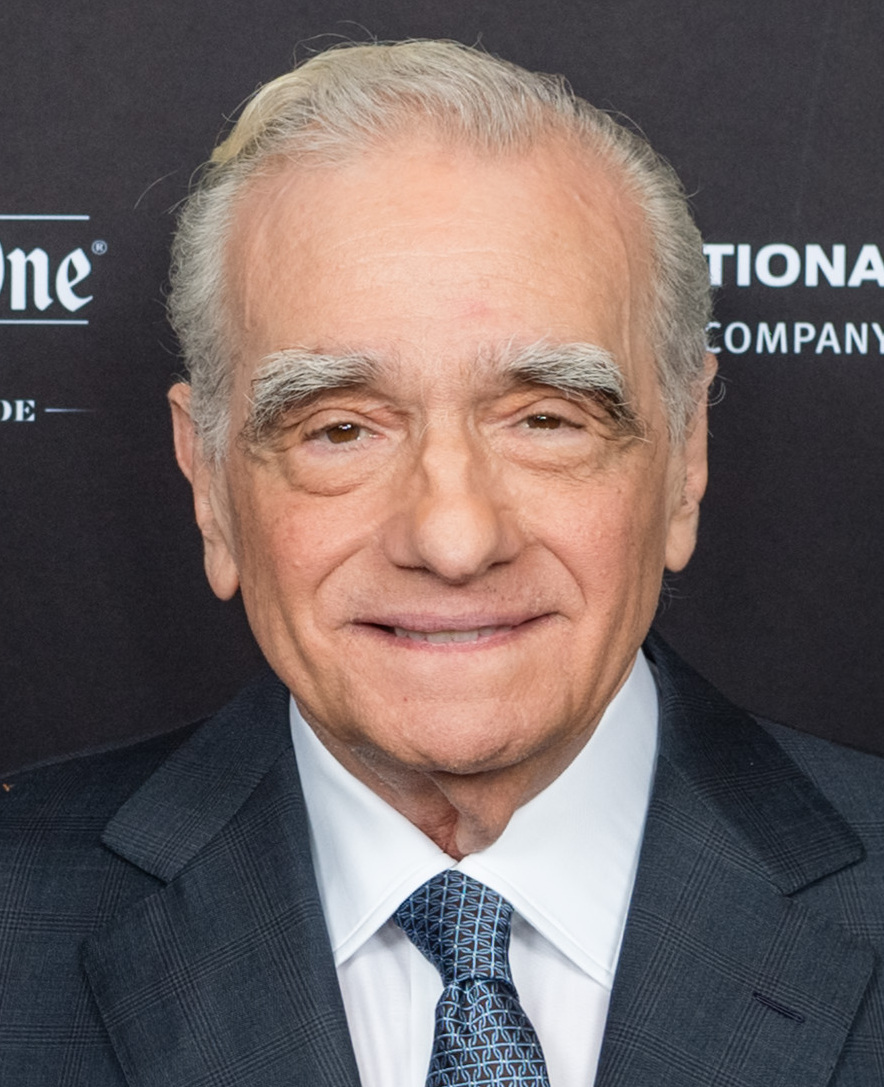
Martin Scorsese, Best Director winner

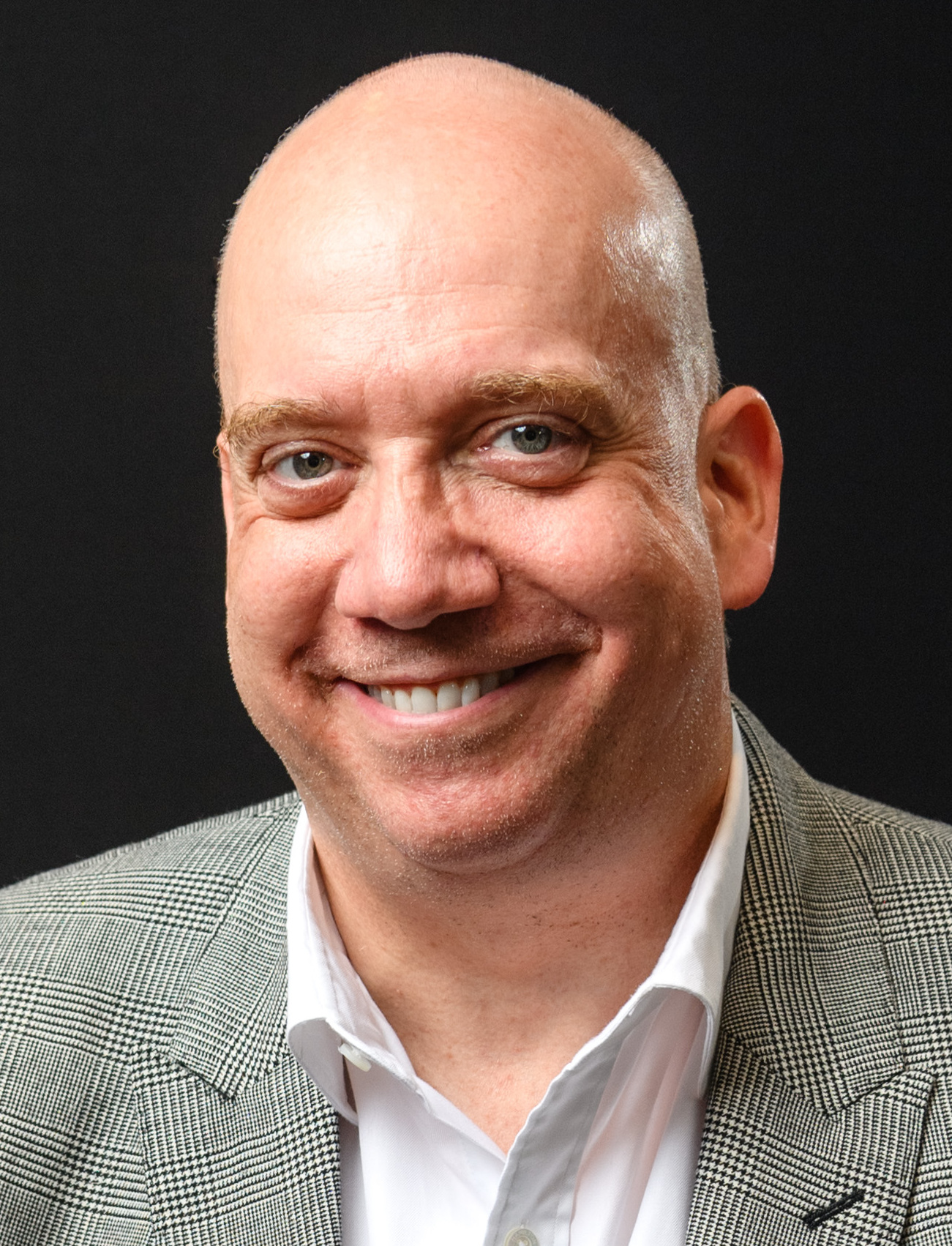
Paul Giamatti, Best Actor winner

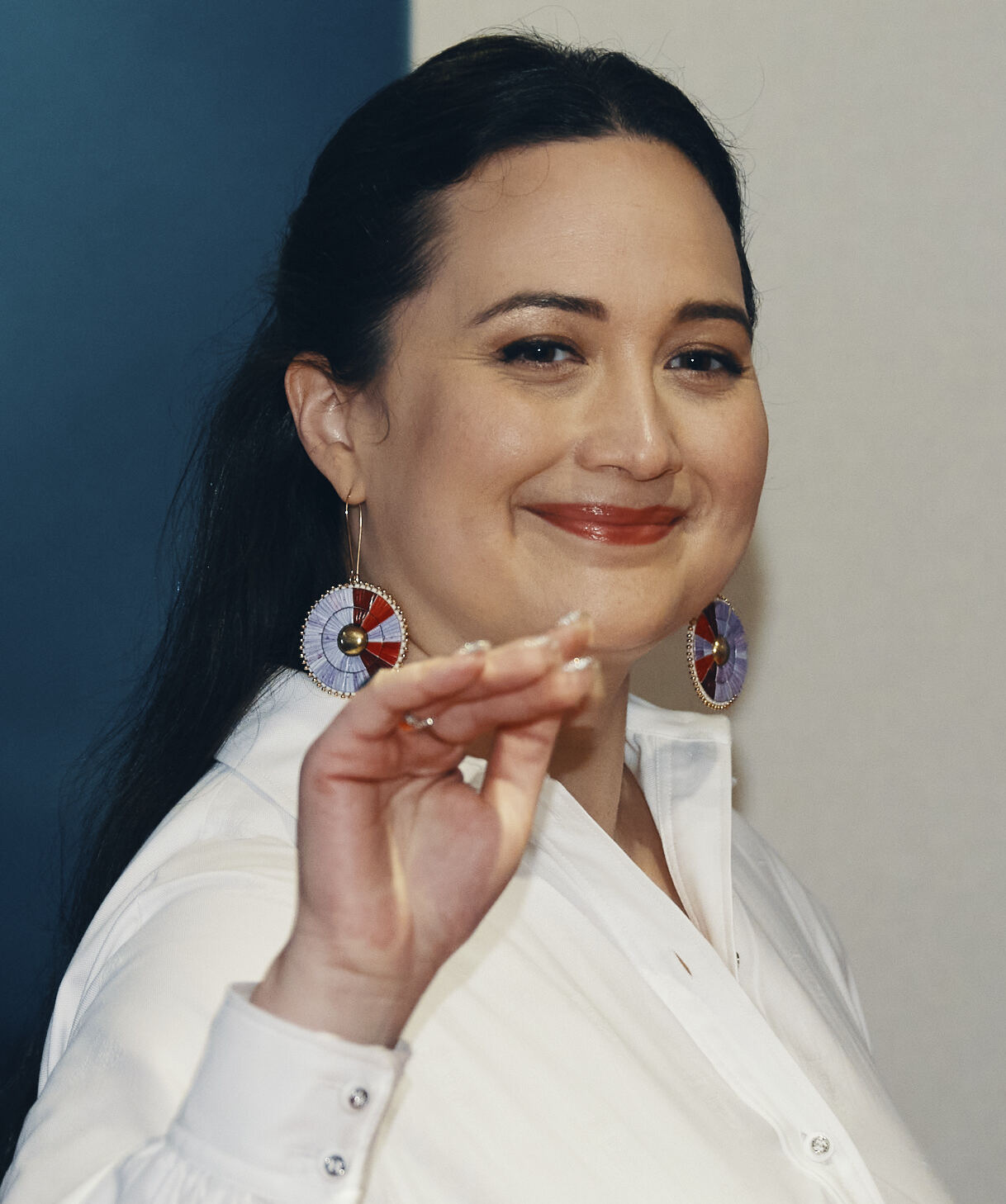
Lily Gladstone, Best Actress winner

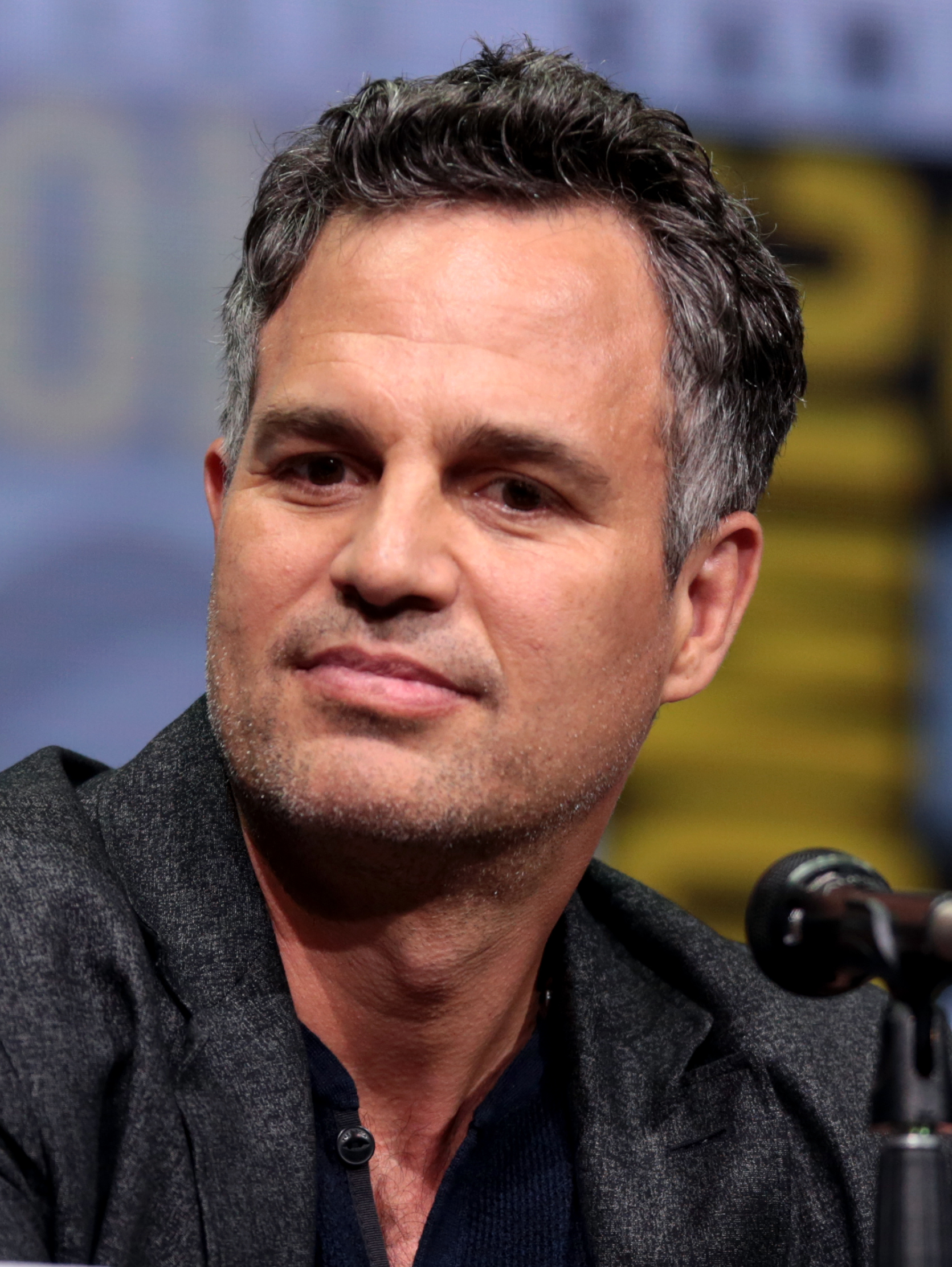
Mark Ruffalo, Best Supporting Actor winner

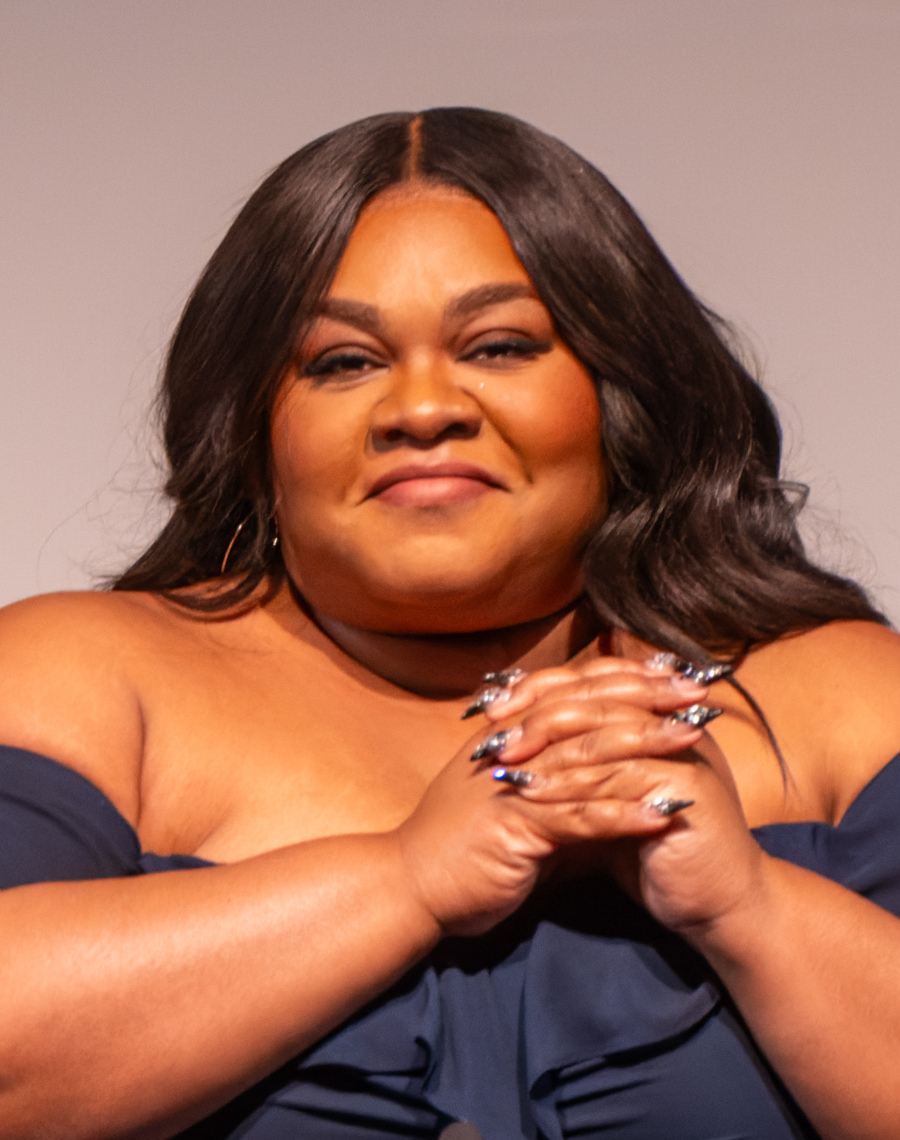
Da'Vine Joy Randolph, Best Supporting Actress winner

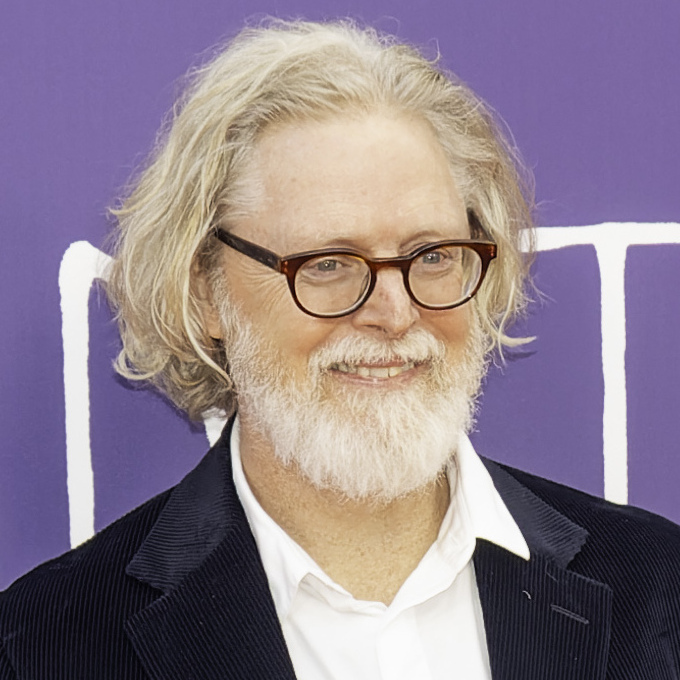
Tony McNamara, Best Adapted Screenplay winner

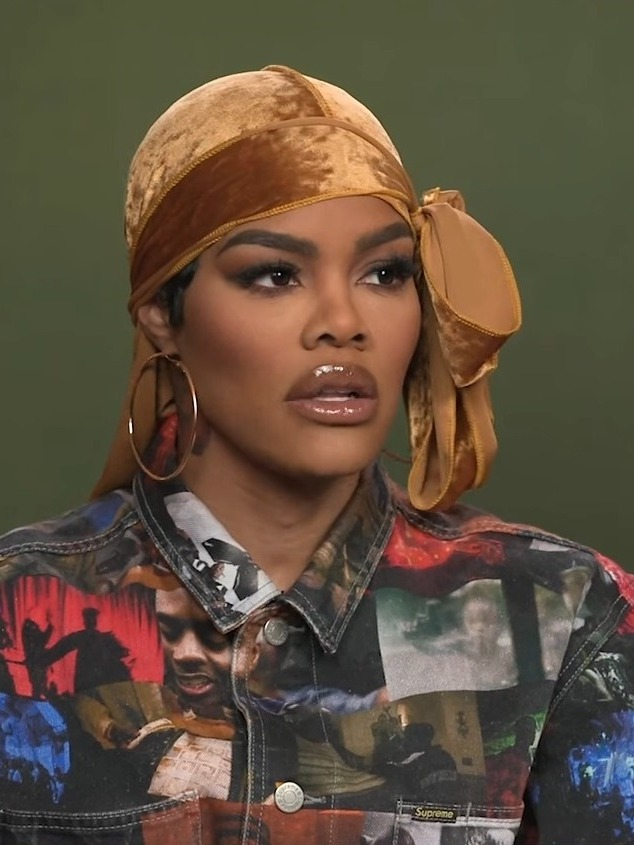
Teyana Taylor, Breakthrough Performance winner

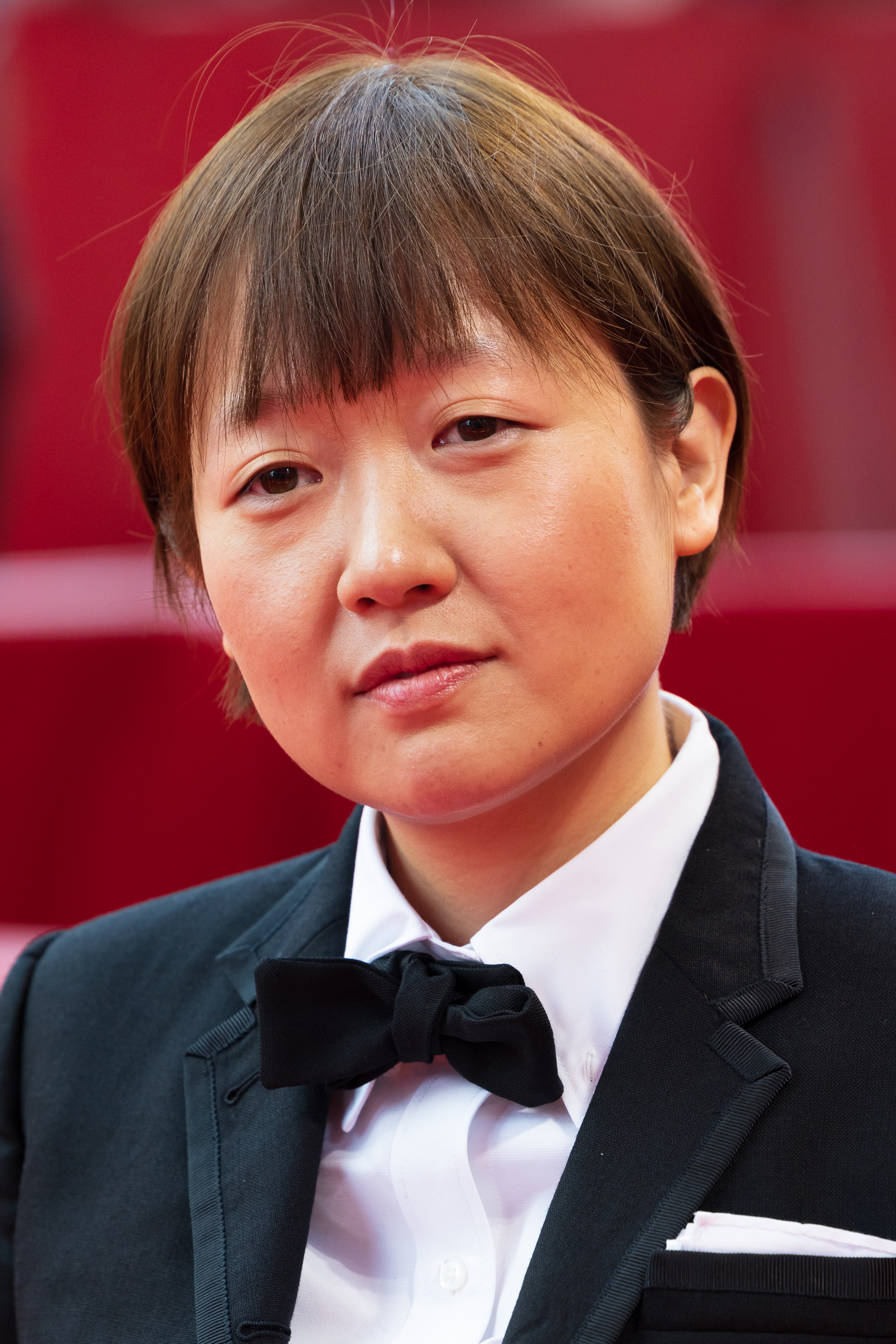
Celine Song, Best Directorial Debut winner

== Top 10 Films ==
Films listed alphabetically except top, which is ranked as Best Film of the Year:

Killers of the Flower Moon

- Barbie
- The Boy and the Heron
- Ferrari
- The Holdovers
- The Iron Claw
- Maestro
- Oppenheimer
- Past Lives
- Poor Things

== Winners ==
Best Film:

- Killers of the Flower Moon

Best Director:

- Martin Scorsese – Killers of the Flower Moon

Best Actor:

- Paul Giamatti – The Holdovers

Best Actress:

- Lily Gladstone – Killers of the Flower Moon

Best Supporting Actor:

- Mark Ruffalo – Poor Things

Best Supporting Actress:

- Da'Vine Joy Randolph – The Holdovers

Best Original Screenplay:

- David Hemingson – The Holdovers

Best Adapted Screenplay:

- Tony McNamara – Poor Things

Best Animated Feature:

- Spider-Man: Across the Spider-Verse

Best International Film:

- Anatomy of a Fall

Best Documentary:

- Still: A Michael J. Fox Movie

Best Ensemble:

- The Iron Claw

Breakthrough Performance:

- Teyana Taylor – A Thousand and One

Best Directorial Debut:

- Celine Song – Past Lives

Outstanding Achievement in Cinematography:

- Rodrigo Prieto – Barbie and Killers of the Flower Moon

Outstanding Achievement in Stunt Artistry:

- Chad Stahelski (director) and Stephen Dunlevy & Scott Rogers (stunt coordinators) – John Wick: Chapter 4

NBR Icon Award:

- Bradley Cooper

== Top 5 International Films ==
Anatomy of a Fall (France)

- Fallen Leaves (Finland)
- La chimera (Italy)
- The Teachers' Lounge (Germany)
- Tótem (Mexico)
- The Zone of Interest (Poland / United Kingdom)

== Top 5 Documentaries ==
Still: A Michael J. Fox Movie

- 20 Days in Mariupol
- 32 Sounds
- The Eternal Memory
- The Pigeon Tunnel
- A Still Small Voice

== Top 10 Independent Films ==
- All Dirt Roads Taste of Salt
- All of Us Strangers
- BlackBerry
- Earth Mama
- Flora and Son
- The Persian Version
- Scrapper
- Showing Up
- Theater Camp
- A Thousand and One
