= A Still Small Voice (film) =

2023 American documentary film

- Official poster
- Directed by: Luke Lorentzen
- Produced by: Kellen Quinn; Ashleigh McArthur; Luke Lorentzen
- Starring: Margaret 'Mati' Engel
- Cinematography: Luke Lorentzen
- Edited by: Luke Lorentzen
- Music by: Niki Hexum; Zack Hexum
- Production companies: Hedgehog Films, Inc.; Spark Features; Jewish Story Partners; Catapult Film Fund
- Distributed by: Abramorama
- Release date: January 21, 2023 (Sundance)
- Running time: 93 minutes
- Country: United States
- Language: English

A Still Small Voice is a 2023 American documentary film directed by Luke Lorentzen. Produced by Hedgehog Films, the documentary follows Mati, a chaplain completing a year-long residency at New York City's Mount Sinai Hospital, as she learns to provide spiritual care to people confronting profound life changes. It had its world premiere on January 21, 2023, at 2023 Sundance Film Festival, where it won directing award for Luke Lorentzen.

The film featured in the list of Top 5 Documentaries of 2023 of National Board of Review and was also shortlisted for the Academy Award for Best Documentary Feature Film at the 96th Academy Awards.

== Background ==
In 2019, Luke Lorentzen's sister Claire was working as a hospital chaplain, that's how he got to know about work of hospital chaplains. In his own words, "The work of a chaplain is multifaceted but often circles back to attentiveness." He added, "It’s about giving loving attention in a space where things are moving so quickly and chaotically, [albeit] the attention seeming simple, is overwhelmingly powerful and meaningful."

Margaret Mati Engel initially was not eager to be a part of a documentary, but Luke Lorentzen talked with her for months before trust was built. They went through different experiences to arrive at a process that felt collaborative, supportive, and deeply in touch with the principles of chaplaincy. Lorentzen, himself said, "I think the film started to really deepen and become the best version of itself once I had learned enough about chaplaincy to sort of carry those principles with me into the room with Mati."

== Content ==
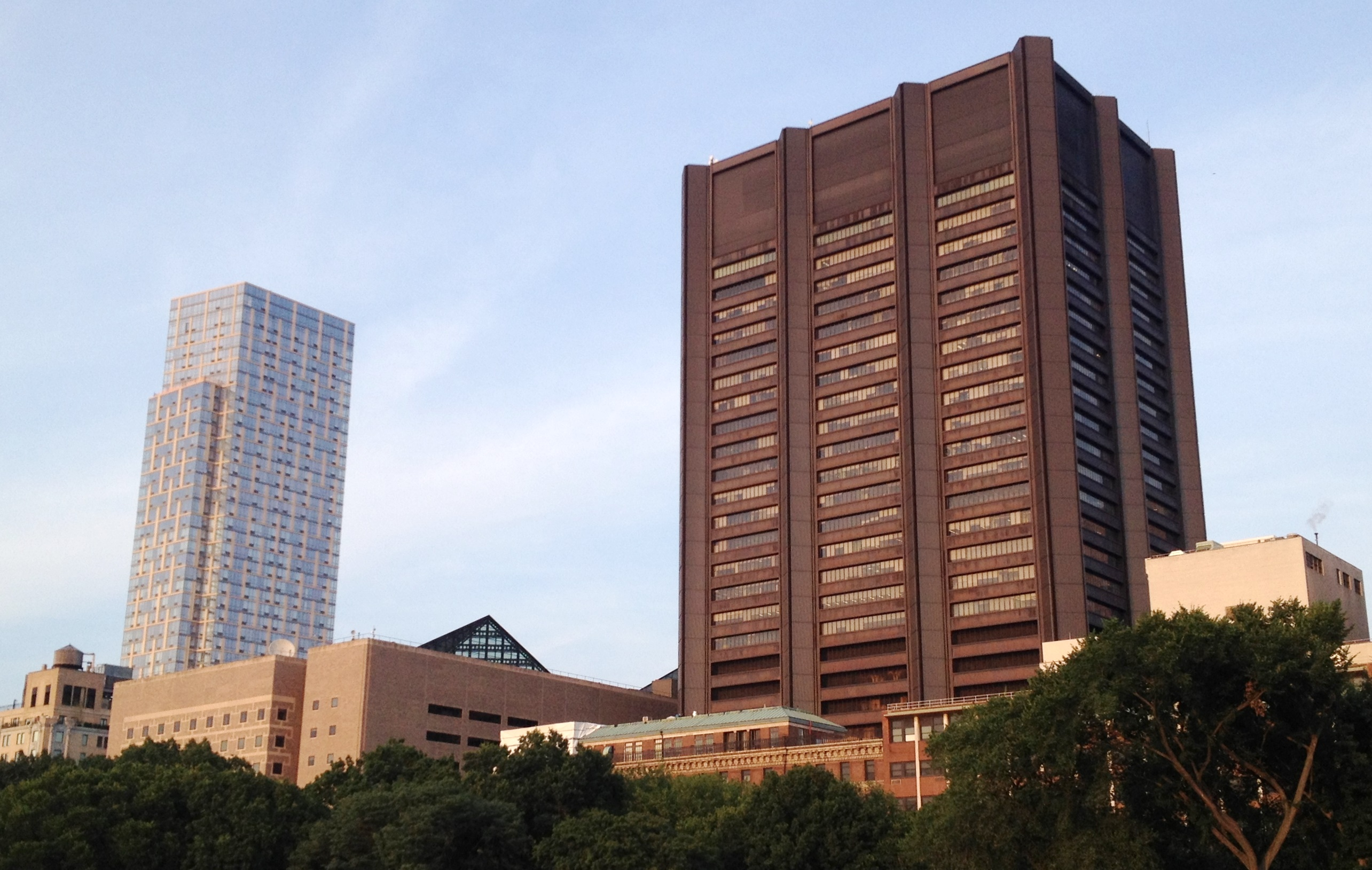
Buildings of Mount Sinai seen from Central Park

In this documentary, Luke Lorentzen immerses himself in Mount Sinai Hospital (Manhattan), an American hospital, and records the quiet but powerful emotions and close and personal interactions of the subjects. The film features Mati, a chaplain finishing her one-year hospital training with the guidance of her mentor. They face the challenging task of offering spiritual support to patients and families who are in distress or mourning, especially during a pandemic. The film also shows us that the helpers also need help sometimes.

== Release ==
The film had its world premiere on January 21, 2023, at 2023 Sundance Film Festival in U.S. Documentary Competition. It also competed at the 47th Hong Kong International Film Festival in 'Documentary Competition' and was screened on April 7, 2023.

It was screened at the Mammoth Lakes Film Festival at Mammoth Lakes, California on May 26, 2023, for West Coast Premiere, and on August 6, 2023, at the Melbourne International Film Festival for the Australian Premiere.

On September 28, Abramorama, a theatrical distributor, acquired the North American theatrical rights of the film.

== Reception ==
On the review aggregator Rotten Tomatoes website, the film has an approval rating of 92% based on 26 reviews with an average rating of 7.9/10. On Metacritic, it has a weighted average score of 80 out of 100 based on 8 reviews, indicating "Universal Acclaim".

The New York Times honored the film by assigning it with the prestigious 'Critic's Pick' and reviewing it Amy Nicholson quoted a scene from the film, in which the main participant (Mati) baptizes an infant who died at birth. Nicholson wrote, "The holy water is in a Styrofoam cup, as somewhere, a door slams." She added "It’s human and messy — and it’s divine." Sheri Linden of Hollywood Reporter described the fim as "Tough, penetrating and deeply moving". David Ehrlich of IndieWire graded it B and wrote, "A raw and lucid observational documentary about people whose life’s work is making space for death."

== Accolades ==
Award	Date of ceremony	Category	Recipient(s)	Result	Ref.
Sundance Film Festival	January 27, 2023	U.S. Documentary Competition: Directing	Luke Lorentzen	Won	
Mammoth Lakes Film Festival	May 29, 2023	Jury Award for Best US Documentary Feature	A Still Small Voice	Won	
National Board of Review	6 December 2023	Top 5 Documentaries	A Still Small Voice	Won (Note: This award does not have a single winner, but recognizes 5 top documentaries in alphabetical order.)	

=== Listicle ===
Publisher	Year	Listicle	Placement	Ref.
17th Cinema Eye Honors	2023	The Unforgettables	Included	

== See also ==
- Academy Award for Best Documentary Feature Film
- Submissions for the Academy Award for Best Documentary Feature
