= Midnight Family =

Documentary film

- Film poster
- Directed by: Luke Lorentzen
- Written by: Luke Lorentzen
- Produced by: Kellen Quinn
- Starring: Fer Ochoa; Josue Ochoa; Juan Ochoa
- Cinematography: Luke Lorentzen
- Edited by: Luke Lorentzen; Paloma López
- Music by: Leonardo Heiblum; Jacobo Lieberman; Alexis Ruiz; Andrés Sánchez
- Production companies: Hedgehog Films; No Ficción
- Release date: 26 January 2019 (Sundance Film)
- Running time: 81 minutes
- Countries: Mexico; United States
- Language: Spanish

Midnight Family is a 2019 Mexican-American documentary film written and directed by Luke Lorentzen. It focuses on Ochoa family who run a private ambulance business. It is produced by Kellen Quinn under the banner of Hedgehog Films, and No Ficción. It stars Fer Ochoa, Josue Ochoa, and Juan Ochoa.

== Synopsis ==
The Ochoas are a family of paramedics who own a private ambulance in Mexico City. Mainly set at night, we watch as the Ochoas monitor emergency calls and race other private ambulances to accidents in hopes of making enough money to sustain their business and family. A series of vignettes shows the family interacting with one another, patients, hospitals, and the police. Among their patients are a young woman assaulted by her boyfriend, the child of an addict, a mother and son in a car accident, and a young woman who suffered a fall. At the end of each ride, the Ochoas must demand payment from their patient or their families. The scenes build upon one another to tell a story of the risks, rewards, and heartbreak of running the service.

== Cast ==
- Fer Ochoa as himself
- Josue Ochoa as himself
- Juan Ochoa as himself

== Release ==
=== Critical response ===
On the review aggregator Rotten Tomatoes, the film holds an approval rating of 97% based on 72 reviews, with an average rating of 7.8/10. The website's critical consensus reads, "As narratively urgent as it is technically well-crafted, Midnight Family offers an enthralling and disquieting glimpse of healthcare in modern Mexico." Metacritic, which uses a weighted average, assigned the film a score of 81 out of 100, based on 14 critics, indicating "universal acclaim".

Carlos Aguilar writing for the Los Angeles Times wrote, "Life-or-death incidents unfold before our eyes with intense urgency, yet the filmmaker finds breathing room to intimately profile a group of terribly underpaid heroes". Monica Castillo of TheWrap wrote, "Midnight Family does not shy away from showing the pressures they face from all sides and the constant exhaustion in their line of work, but we also come to understand their sense of loyalty to their patients". Nick Schager writing for Variety wrote, "Midnight Family illustrates that compensation is rarely in the cards here, as haggling leads to either polite apologies from those unable to pay, or harsher rejections from those simply unwilling to reimburse the paramedics for their trouble".
