= A. Dean Bell =

American filmmaker

- Education: SUNY Purchase College (bachelor's degree, 1983)
- Occupation: Filmmaker

A. Dean Bell is an American filmmaker. He is best known for the feature film drama What Alice Found, a Sundance Award-winner and New York Times "Critic's Pick."

== Biography ==
Bell grew up in Rochester, New York. He earned a BFA with Honors in Film from the Conservatory of Theater Arts and Film, School of the Arts at SUNY Purchase College. His 30-minute thesis film "I'm Only There..." starred classmate and future Oscar-winner Melissa Leo. The Melbourne Australia Film Festival called it a "brilliantly black comic look at suburban teenage malaise." The film was recognized by festivals around the world and premiered on the WNYC-PBS series "Independent Focus."

Post-college, Bell's first job was as picture apprentice on the Woody Allen film "Broadway Danny Rose." During this time he optioned screenplays to Ralph Bakshi (Fritz the Cat, Heavy Traffic) and producers Kimberly Myers and Mary Salter.

He made the switch to writing and directing with the newly formed HA! channel which later became Comedy Central. On the program "Afterdrive" he directed short remote sketches with the show's co-host comedian/actor Denis Leary.

Bell got his first chance to write and direct a feature film "BackFire!" (1994) for New York's "Corman-esque" low-budget film producer Chris Ingvordson. This low-brow spoof comedy, written and produced within six months, boasts an all-star cast including Robert Mitchum, Shelley Winters, Telly Savalas and Kathy Ireland. It also featured then unknowns — Purchase schoolmate Edie Falco ("Nurse Jackie"), Kirsten Johnston ("Third Rock") and Mary McCormack ("Private Parts"). "BackFire!" aired frequently on USA Network's "Up All Night" and Comedy Central.

Bell then began writing, directing and executive producing the television series "SportsFigures" for ESPN. The commercial-free program explained physics to teenage audiences using sports as the example. The program ran from 1995 to 2007 and won a NY Emmy Award, Clarion Awards for Best Children's Television Series along with numerous other awards. Celebrity athletes participating in the show included Tony Hawk, Amanda Beard, Derek Jeter, Janet Evans, Steve Young, Julie Foudy, Troy Glaus, Chipper Jones, among many others.

Bell's next feature film "What Alice Found" (2003) was nominated for the grand prize and was awarded a Special Jury Award at the 2003 Sundance Film Festival and was awarded the Grand Prize by jury chair Roman Polanski at the Deauville Festival of American Film in France. Critically acclaimed, "What Alice Found" was praised by Kevin Thomas in the Los Angeles Times: "Sweet, suspenseful, funny, poignant and adult. Judith Ivey gives flat-out one of the year's best performances... a terrific showcase for lovely newcomer Emily Grace...an unexpected treat for sophisticated audiences." "A. Dean Bell's What Alice Found, qualifies as the latest example of an independent film of limited means and unlimited artistry," wrote Andrew Sarris in the New York Observer. The film stars two-time Tony winner Judith Ivey, whom Variety picked as a dark horse Oscar candidate for her role as Sandra. Alongside Ivey are veteran actor Bill Raymond and newcomer Emily Grace as Alice.

Bell worked again with Ivey, directing the dramatic sections of the documentary "Sweet Tornado: Margo Jones and the American Theater", produced by Kay Cattarulla and Robert Tranchin for KERA-PBS. Ms. Ivey played American theater director/entrepreneur Margo Jones opposite Richard Thomas as Tennessee Williams with Marcia Gay Harden narrating. The hour-long film aired on PBS affiliates nationwide.

Bell was then commissioned by Fox Broadcasting to develop an original night time drama-comedy, "Stepdude." A short sample of the pilot episode was produced with Bell directing.

Corporate clients have included AT&T, Phillips Electronics, Liz Claiborne, EscapeMaker.com, Upjohn, Pfizer.

Bell continues to write and develop film, television and web-based projects.

Bell holds the position of associate professor in the School of Film and Media Studies at SUNY Purchase College where he teaches screenwriting and directing and has also taught at Rutgers University, LIU Writers Studio MFA and NYU's Tisch School of the Arts BFA.

== Awards and honors ==
=== "What Alice Found" ===
- Special Jury Prize for Emotional Truth, Sundance Film Festival 2003
- Grand Prize, Deauville Festival of American Film
- Best Feature Film, Cinema Paradiso (Honolulu, Hawaii)
- Official Selection, Tribeca Film Festival, Athens Film Festival, Stockholm Film Festival, Mill Valley Film Festival

=== "ESPN SportsFigures" ===
- 2007 NY Regional Emmy Award - Educational Series
- 1999, 2000, 2003, 2005 Clarion Award – Best Children's Program Age 14 and Up.
- Winner of 8 Parents' Choice Awards 1997-2007
- 2006 Hugo Awards – Certificate of Merit
- 2007 Hugo Awards - Silver Plaque
- 1999 National Educational Media Network – Silver Apple Award

=== "Tastes of New York State" ===
- 2009 NY Region Emmy Award, Informational Series

=== "I'm Only There" ===
- 1st Place, Rochester Int'l Film Festival
- Official Selection, Mill Valley Film Festival, MontrealWorld Film Festival, Melbourne Australia Film Festival
