= My Flesh and Blood =

- Directed by: Jonathan Karsh
- Produced by: Jennifer Chaiken
- Starring: Susan Tom; Anthony Tom; Faith Tom; Joe Tom; Xenia Tom; Margaret Tom
- Cinematography: Amanda Micheli
- Edited by: Eli Olson
- Music by: B. Quincy Griffin; Hector H. Perez
- Release date: 2003
- Running time: 83 minutes
- Country: United States
- Language: English

My Flesh and Blood is a 2003 documentary film by Jonathan Karsh chronicling a year in the life of the Tom family. The Tom family is notable as the mother, Susan Tom, adopted eleven children, most of whom had serious disabilities or diseases. It was nominated for and won several awards, including the Audience Award and the Director's Award at the Sundance Film Festival.

It was aired on HBO as part of the series America Undercover.

== Plot ==
The documentary takes an in-depth look at the Tom family, which mostly consists of children who were rejected by their birth families due to mental or physical disabilities. The film is broken up into seasons, starting out with the family taking part in Halloween in the fall, and ending in the summer of the upcoming year. The family's unconventional home life becomes a foundation for the supports, challenges, and successes that they face daily.

== People ==
- Susan Tom, adoptive mother of the children
- Faith Tom, who survived severe burns as an infant in a crib fire. Faith believes that when she gets older, she will look like "regular people" and emotionally invests in the promises of her plastic surgeons.
- Joe Tom, who has cystic fibrosis and is in the last stages of the disease. Susan and Joe's doctors know that his death is imminent, but, as is common with terminally ill kids, withholds the prognosis from Joe who seems to believe that he will live to be an adult.
- Xenia Tom, who was born without legs. The condition is referred to as congenital amputation.
- Margaret Tom, who has no severe disabilities and assists her mother.
- Anthony Tom, who has recessive dystrophic epidermolysis bullosa. Unlike Joe, he is aware that he has a terminal illness.

There are six other children of whom viewers do not see as much due to the constraints of keeping the film to a reasonable length.

== Reception ==
On the review aggregator website Rotten Tomatoes, 90% of 30 critics' reviews are positive.

== Awards ==
=== Received ===
Amsterdam International Documentary Film Festival

- 2003: Audience Award
- 2003: FIPRESCI Prize

Florida Film Festival

- 2003: Special Jury Award - For documentary feature

International Documentary Association

- 2003: IDA Award - Honorable Mention - Feature Documentaries

Sundance Film Festival

- 2003: Audience Award - Documentary
- 2003: Directing Award - Documentary

=== Nominations ===
International Documentary Association

- 2003: IDA Award - Feature Documentaries

Sundance Film Festival

- 2003: Grand Jury Prize - Documentary

Golden Trailer Awards

- 2004: Golden Trailer - Best Documentary

Satellite Awards

- 2004: Golden Satellite Award - Best Motion Picture, Documentary
