= 2026 Stockholm International Film Festival =

37th edition of Stockholm film festival

- Official poster
- Opening film: Wild Horse Nine by Martin McDonagh
- Closing film: You Can See Everything by Nathan Fielder and Lance Oppenheim
- Location: Stockholm, Sweden
- Founded: 1990
- Awards: Bronze Horse
- Artistic director: Beatrice Karlsson
- No. of films: 130
- Festival date: Opening: 11 November 2026; Closing: 22 November 2026
- Website: SIFF 2026

Stockholm International Film Festival
- 2027 2025

The 37th Stockholm International Film Festival is taking place from 11 to 22 November 2026 in Stockholm, Sweden. The festival opened with political thriller-comedy Wild Horse Nine by Martin McDonagh, the Spotlight of this edition is "Daddy Issues," and focus country is Japan.

The winners were presented on 19 November 2026 during the award ceremony at the Rigoletto cinema. This year's Bronze Horse for Best Film went to American drama sci-fi thriller film Chronovisor by Jack Auen and Kevin Walker, while Best Director award was won by Jordan Firstman for Club Kid. The festival will close with the metadocumentary film You Can See Everything by Nathan Fielder and Lance Oppenheim.

== Festival overview ==
This year's Festival Center was Klarabion in Kulturhuset; during the festival, it was relocated to Bio Skandia. The festival was opened on 10 November with the VIP Gala by Anna Croneman, CEO of the Swedish Film Institute. The official public opening took place on 11 November. A preview of Grab Them by the Balls, a tragicomic short film based on real events by Swedish director Johan Stavsjö, was presented.

== Jury ==
=== Stockholm Competition ===
- Frida Gustavsson, Swedish actress and former model
- Björn Stein, Swedish director and film editor
- Maida Krak, film and television producer at Swedish TV production company, Jarowskij/Yellow Bird

=== Stockholm Documentary Competition ===
- Jon Asp, Swedish film scholar, writer and film critic
- Tova Mozard, Swedish photographer and filmmaker
- Dennis Harvey, Irish director, writer cinematographer

=== Short Film Competition ===
- Nils Wetterholm Swedish actor
- Tuva Björk, filmmaker based in Stockholm, Sweden
- Rebecca González Léon, editor-in-chief of the film magazine FLM

=== FIPRESCI jury ===
- Karoline Eriksson, film critic and editor-in-chief
- Josef Nagel, German film critic and television editor, journalist at film magazine Filmdienst
- Joanna Orzechowska-Bonis, film critic, France Member of FIPRESCI, journalist at Polish language weekly press review Tygodnik Angora

=== Nikon Short Film Award jury ===
- Mikael Marcimain, Swedish film and television director, jury president
- Karim Fakih, Beirut-born, Stockholm-based director
- Rebecka Harper, Swedish film and TV actress

=== TV4 Rising Star Award ===
In this edition actors Lena Endre and Alexander Abdallah join the expert jury.

- Simon Norrthon, Swedish actor, Chair of the Swedish Union for Performing Arts and Film
- Lena Endre, Swedish actress of film and television
- Alexander Abdallah, Swedish actor and filmmaker
- Jan Göransson, Head of Press, Swedish Film Institute
- Lisa Rosengren Lagercrantz, Film & TV Producers Association

== Official selection ==
The programme was unveiled on 14 October 2026. The festival will screen 130 premieres from 60 countries.

=== Opening and closing films ===
A co-production of the United Kingdom, United States, and Chile, a black comedy political thriller film Wild Horse Nine is the opening film of the festival. American documentary film You Can See Everything about Elizabeth Holmes will be the closing film.

English title	Original title	Director(s)	Production countrie(s)
Opening film
Wild Horse Nine		Martin McDonagh	United Kingdom, United States, Chile
Closing film
You Can See Everything		Nathan Fielder, Lance Oppenheim	United States

=== Stockholm Competition ===
This year’s 18 competing films include Marine Atlan’s debut film La Gradiva, and Sandra Wollner's psychological drama film Everytime.

English title	Original title	Director(s)	Production countrie(s)
9 Temples to Heaven	9 วัด สู่สวรรค์	Sompot Chidgasornpongse	Thailand, Norway, France
At Night		Beatrice Gibson	United Kingdom, France
Bedford Park		Stephanie Ahn	United States
The Burning Giants	ยักษ์ไหม้	Phuttiphong Aroonpheng	Thailand, France, Singapore, Taipei, Netherlands
Chronovisor		Jack Auen & Kevin Walker	United States
Clarissa		Arie Esiri, Chuko Esiri	Nigeria, United States
Club Kid		Jordan Firstman	United States
The Dreamed Adventure	Das Geträumte Abenteuer	Valeska Grisebach	Germany, France, Austria, Bulgaria
Everytime		Sandra Wollner	Austria, Germany
Flesh and Fuel	Du Fioul dans les artères	Pierre Le Gall	France, Poland
Hold onto Me	Κράτα Με	Myrsini Aristidou	Cyprus, Denmark, Greece
I'll Be Gone in June		Katharina Rivilis	Germany, Switzerland, United States
Josephine		Beth de Araújo	United States
La Gradiva		Marine Atlan	France, Italy
Low Expectations	Lave Forventninger	Eivind Landsvik	Norway, Denmark
Manhunt		Wayne Wapeemukwa	Canada
Our Share of Sand		Shalini Adnani	United Kingdom, India, Greece
Tangles		Leah Nelson	Canada, United States

=== Stockholm Documentary Competition ===
The following films were selected for the documentary competition:

English title	Original title	Director(s)	Production countrie(s)
Birds of War		Janay Boulos and Abd Alkader Habak	United Kingdom, Syrian Arab Republic, Lebanon
Burgundy		Michael Dweck and Gregory Kershaw	France
Che Guevara: The Last Companions	Les Survivants du Che	Christophe Réveille	France
The History of Concrete		John Wilson	United States
Jaripeo		Efraín Mojica, Rebecca Zweig	Mexico, United States, France
Nuisance Bear		Gabriela Osio Vanden, Jack Weisman	United States, Canada
Rehearsals for a Revolution	خاطرات ایران	Pegah Ahangarani	Iran, Czech Republic, Spain
Seized		Sharon Liese	United States
Soul Patrol		J.M. Harper	United States
To Hold a Mountain		Biljana Tutorov and Petar Glomazić	Serbia, France, Montenegro, Slovenia, Croatia
Too Much Sugar		Robert Greene	United States
Who Killed Alex Odeh?		Jason Osder and William Lafi Youmans	United States
You Can See Everything		Nathan Fielder and Lance Oppenheim	United States

=== Masters ===
The following films were selected in the Masters section (most experienced directors and profiled voices from the world of films):

English title	Original title	Director(s)	Production countrie(s)
The Blood Countess	Die Blutgräfin	Ulrike Ottinger	Austria, Luxembourg, Germany
The Day She Returns	그녀가 돌아온 날	Hong Sang-soo	South Korea
Fatherland	Vaterland	Paweł Pawlikowski	Poland, France, Italy, Germany
Heil Jupiter!		Carlos Reygadas	Mexico, Poland, Portugal, Norway, Sweden
Ink		Danny Boyle	United Kingdom, United States
Minotaur	Минотавр	Andrey Zvyagintsev	France, Latvia, Germany
Paper Tiger		James Gray	United States, Brazil
Parallel Tales	Histoires Parallèles	Asghar Farhadi	France, United States, Italy, Belgium
Sheep in the Box	箱の中の羊	Hirokazu Kore-eda	Japan

=== Open Zone ===
English title	Original title	Director(s)	Production countrie(s)
All the Lovers in the Night	すべて真夜中の恋人たち	Yukiko Sode	Japan, France
Another Day	Garance	Jeanne Herry	France
Dua		Blerta Basholli	Kosovo, Switzerland, France
Everything Else Is Noise	Lo demás es ruido	Nicolás Pereda	Germany, Canada, Mexico
Falling House	مراقب	Mohsen Gharaei	Iran, United States, Germany
The Friend's House Is Here	Hossein Keshavarz, Maryam Ataei	United States, Iran	
No Good Men	Kabul Jan	Shahrbanoo Sadat	Germany, France, Norway, Denmark, Afghanistan
No Paradise If You Are Killed by a Woman		Halkawt Mustafa	Norway, Iraq, Sweden, United Arab Emirates
The Remotes		John Torres	Philippines
Rose		Markus Schleinzer	Austria, Germany
Yellow Letters	Gelbe Briefe	İlker Çatak	Germany, France, Turkey

=== Icons ===
English title	Original title	Director(s)	Production countrie(s)
Behemoth!		Tony Gilroy	United States
The Debut		Jesse Eisenberg	United States
The Life and Deaths of Wilson Shedd		Tim Blake Nelson	United States
The Only Living Pickpocket in New York		Noah Segan	United States
Onwards and Sideways		John Madden	United Kingdom
Primetime		Lance Oppenheim	United States
Wicker		Eleanor Wilson, Alex Huston Fischer	United States, United Kingdom
Wild Horse Nine		Martin McDonagh	United Kingdom, United States, Chile
A Woman's Life	La Vie d'une Femme	Charline Bourgeois-Tacquet	France, Belgium
Your Mother Your Mother Your Mother		Bassam Tariq	United States

=== American Independents ===
The following films were selected in the American Independents section (America as seen through the most independent of filmmaking eyes):

English title	Original title	Director(s)	Production countrie(s)
Anima		Brian Tetsuro Ivie	United States
Chili Finger		Edd Benda and Stephen Helstad	United States
Ha-Chan, Shake Your Booty!		Josef Kubota Wladyka	United States
I Love Boosters		Boots Riley	United States
The Leader		Michael Gallagher	United States
Magazine		Alexandra Pechman	United States
Night Nurse		Georgia Bernstein	United States
Union County		Adam Meeks	United States
Wishful Thinking		Graham Parkes	United States

=== Discovery ===
The following films were selected in the Discovery section (stories from debuting directors):

English title	Original title	Director(s)	Production countrie(s)
Forest High	Forêt Ivre	Manon Coubia	Belgium, France
Fruit Gathering	သစ်သီးခူး	Aung Phyoe	Myanmar, Czech Republic, France
Furies	Furies	Rami Kodeih	Lebanon, Brazil
A Girl Unknown	无名女孩	Zou Jing	China, France
The Incomer		Louis Paxton	United Kingdom
Light Pillar	寒夜灯柱	Zao Xu	China
Masc		Bertil Nilsson	United Kingdom
Sad Girlz	Chicas tristes	Fernanda Tovar	Mexico, Spain, France

=== Twilight Zone ===
The following films were selected in the Twilight Zone section (Innovative, terrifying and twisted genre films):

English title	Original title	Director(s)	Production countrie(s)
Bad Lieutenant: Tokyo		Takashi Miike	United States, United Kingdom, Japan
Colony		Yeon Sang-ho	South Korea
The Fox		Dario Russo	Australia
Full Phil		Quentin Dupieux	France
Paradise Lost	실낙원	Yeon Sang-ho	South Korea
Vintage Violence		Eugene Kotlyarenko	United States, Japan

=== Special Presentations ===
English title	Original title	Director(s)	Production countrie(s)
Making Marie Antoinette		Eleanor Coppola	United States, Italy
Musk		Alex Gibney	United States
Wallander – One Step Behind		Molly Hartleb	Sweden

== Stockholm Short Film Competition ==
=== Short Film Programmes ===
==== Bromance ====
- Thunder Platoon by Theo Montoya, Colombia, France
- The Man Who Moved The Platform
- Tropic of The Mourning Gecko by Stavros Markoulakis, Greece, Netherlands, France
- What Do the Maknines Dream Of by Sarra Ryma, Algeria, France

==== Sad Girl Cinema ====
- Flesh Impact by Maggie Gyllenhaal, United States
- Paper Plane by Saoirse Ronan, United States, Ireland
- Daddy´s Little Meatball Yael Grunseit, United States, Australia
- LVX, Fabian Villiger, Switzerland, United Kingdom
- Trance by Jona Schloßer, Germany

==== Currents ====
- They're Here by Laura Poitras, United States, France
- The Wayfinders by Peggy Ahwesh, United States
- A Few Things Happening by a River Daniel Soares, Portugal, France
- Masao Adachi Takes A Passport Photo by Kamal Aljafari, France, Japan, Germany

==== If Things Could Talk ====
- If Things Could Ever Talk by Giulia Cosentino, Italy
- Paper Trail by Don Hertzfeldt, United States
- Incident on the Mountain by Savunthara Seng, Cambodia
- Class Photo by Arnas Balčiūnas, Lithuania
- Placeholder by Elisa Beli Borrelli, Ireland

=== Nordic Shorts ===
- The Last Tourist in Europe (Den sista turisten i Europa), Balder Ljunggren, Sweden
- Stealing Memories (Stjålne Minner), Anders Davidsen, Norway, Sweden
- Aldrig Nok, Julius Lagoutte Larsen, Denmark
- Tutto Passa (Everything Passes), Rosa Frølund-Lie , Denmark, Italy
- Korpus, Amalie Maria Nielsen, Denmark

== Awards ==
The awards winners were revealed on 19 November 2026.

=== Bronze Horse ===
- Best Film: Chronovisor by Jack Auen and Kevin Walker
- Best Director: Jordan Firstman for Club Kid
- Best Actor: Jordan Firstman for Club Kid
- Best Actress: Sophie Okonedo for Clarissa
- Best Screenplay: Beth de Araújo for Josephine
- Best Debut: Pierre le Galle for Flesh and Fuel
- Best Cinematography: Jonathan Glendon for Manhunt
- Best Documentary: You Can See Everything by Nathan Fielder and Lance Oppenheim
- Best Short Film: Paper Trail by Don Hertzfeldt

=== FIPRESCI Award ===
- Best Film: Everything Else Is Noise by Nicolás Pereda

=== Nikon Short Film Award ===
- Matez Garci for Ashes for All

=== TV4 Rising Star Award ===
- Nonni Ardal Hammarström

The special honourable awards were announced on 14 October 2026 along with programme.

=== Stockholm Achievement Award ===
- John Turturro, American actor and filmmaker

John Turturro recipient of Stockholm Achievement Award

- Olivia Colman, English actress

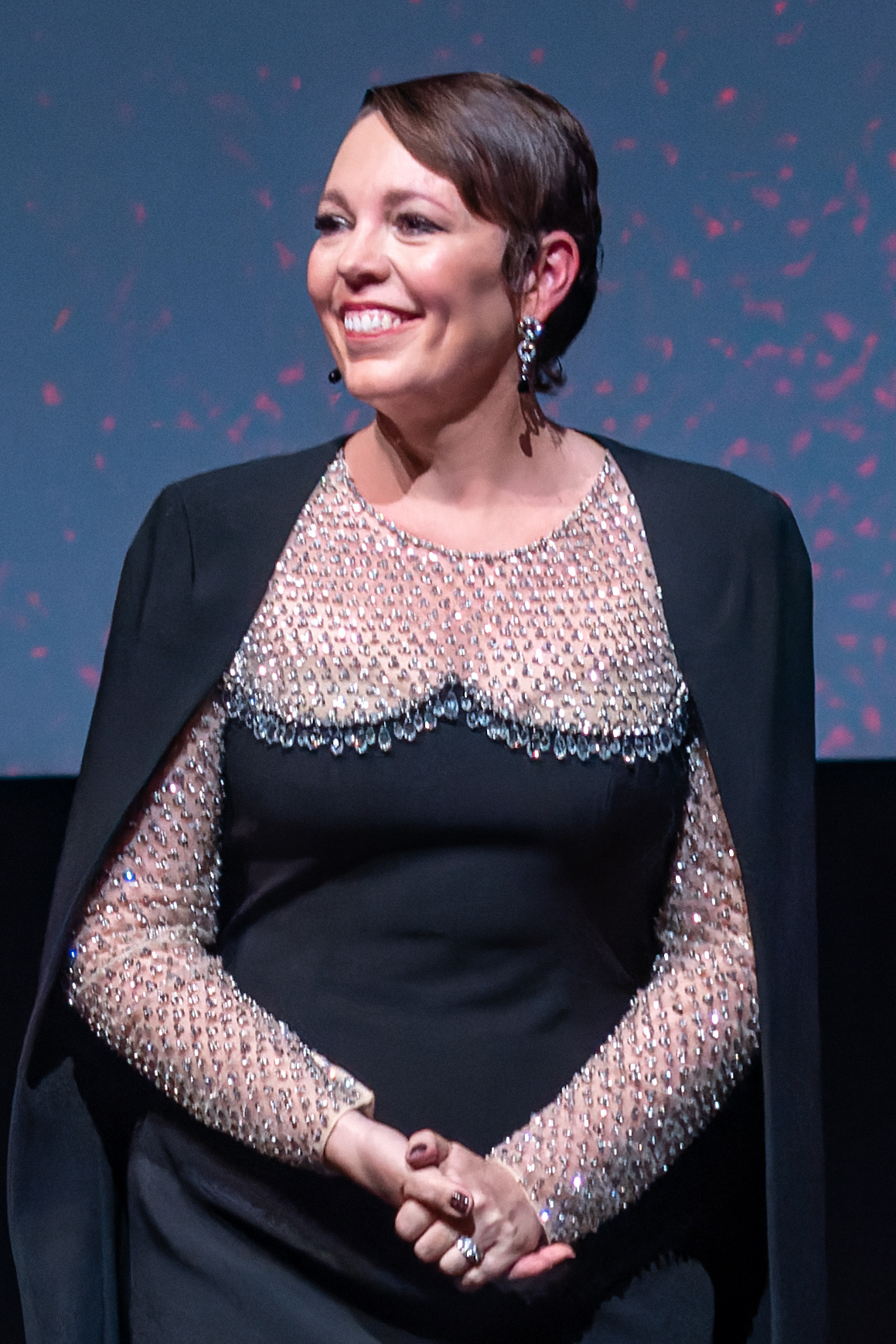
Olivia Colman recipient of Stockholm Achievement Award

=== Lifetime Achievement Award ===
- Lena Olin, Swedish actress

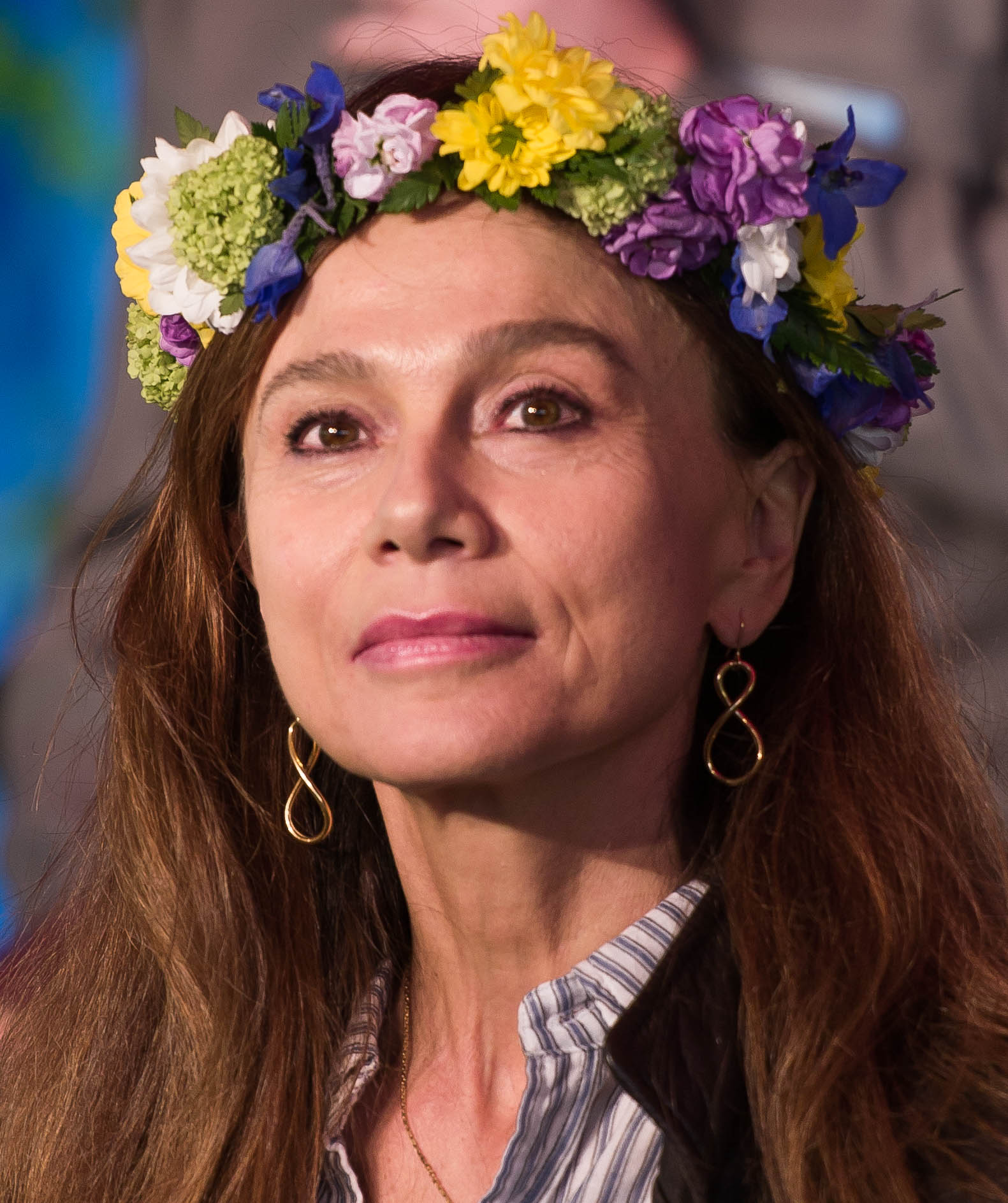
Lena Olin recipient of Lifetime Achievement Award
