= List of films with a 100% rating on Rotten Tomatoes =

A list of 100% rated films from the Rotten Tomatoes website

Rotten Tomatoes logo

On the review aggregator website Rotten Tomatoes, a film has a rating of 100% if each professional review recorded by the website is assessed as positive rather than negative. The percentage is based on the film's reviews aggregated by the website and assessed as positive or negative, and when all aggregated reviews are positive, the film has a 100% rating. Listed below are films with 100% ratings that have a critics' consensus or have been reviewed by at least twenty film critics. Many of these films, particularly those with a high number of positive reviews, have achieved wide critical acclaim and are often considered among the best films ever made. A number of these films also appear on the AFI's 100 Years...100 Movies lists, but there are many others and several entries with dozens of positive reviews, which are considered surprising to some experts. To date, Leave No Trace holds the site's record, with a rating of 100% and 248 positive reviews.

== Breaking the 100% rating ==
The 100% rating is vulnerable to a film critic purposely submitting a negative review for notoriety. For example, Lady Bird had a 100% rating based on 196 positive reviews when a film critic submitted a negative review solely in response to the perfect rating. To date, Lady Bird has a 99% rating with 395 positive reviews and four negative reviews. Paddington 2 held a perfect rating from its release in 2017 until a film critic published a negative review in June 2021. To date, Paddington 2 has a 99% rating with 251 positive reviews and two negative reviews. The 100% rating could also be affected by rediscovering negative reviews, as in the case with Citizen Kane, when an 80-year-old negative review from the Chicago Tribune affected its former 100% rating with 115 reviews. As of August 2026, Citizen Kane has a 99% rating with 136 positive reviews and one negative review.

== List ==
Year	Name	No. of reviews	Ref.
1920	The Golem: How He Came into the World	31	
1921	The Kid	49	
1922	Nanook of the North	35	
1924	The Last Laugh	30	
1924	The Navigator	23	
1925	Battleship Potemkin	49	
1926	The Adventures of Prince Achmed	21	
1926	The Black Pirate	61	
1928	The Cameraman	20	
1928	The Man Who Laughs	23	
1928	The Patsy	20	
1929	Un Chien Andalou	25	
1931	M	63	
1931	The Public Enemy	34	
1931	Mädchen in Uniform	42	
1932	Boudu Saved from Drowning	23	
1932	I Was Born, But...	25	
1932	The Most Dangerous Game	25	
1933	State Fair	47	
1933	Baby Face	20	
1934	L'Atalante	40	
1935	Top Hat	38	
1935	Captain Blood	30	
1937	Pépé le Moko	31	
1937	A Star Is Born	23	
1937	Make Way for Tomorrow	21	
1938	Angels with Dirty Faces	24	
1938	Holiday	30	
1938	The Adventures of Robin Hood	47	
1939	Only Angels Have Wings	31	
1939	Stagecoach	46	
1939	Young Mr. Lincoln	18	
1940	The Grapes of Wrath	46	
1940	The Philadelphia Story	103	
1940	Pinocchio	61	
1940	The Great McGinty	27	
1940	The Thief of Bagdad	28	
1941	Sullivan's Travels	42	
1941	Ball of Fire	26	
1941	Here Comes Mr. Jordan	21	
1941	The Devil and Daniel Webster	23	
1942	Holiday Inn	23	
1942	Gentleman Jim	26	
1943	Shadow of a Doubt	54	
1943	Day of Wrath	25	
1944	Henry V	26	
1944	Laura	60	
1945	Rome, Open City	45	
1946	Great Expectations	28	
1946	My Darling Clementine	33	
1947	Black Narcissus	36	
1947	Odd Man Out	30	
1947	Quai des Orfèvres	32	
1947	The Ghost and Mrs. Muir	21	
1948	The Treasure of the Sierra Madre	51	
1948	The Fallen Idol	34	
1948	Red River	29	
1948	Letter from an Unknown Woman	22	
1948	Oliver Twist	22	
1949	Kind Hearts and Coronets	49	
1949	Late Spring	26	
1949	Jour de fête	21	
1949	A Letter to Three Wives	20	
1950	Winchester '73	33	
1951	The Lavender Hill Mob	72	
1952	Singin' in the Rain	75	
1953	Les Vacances de Monsieur Hulot	30	
1953	Ugetsu	32	
1953	Tokyo Story	49	
1953	The Wages of Fear	50	
1953	I Vitelloni	28	
1953	The Naked Spur	22	
1954	Touchez pas au grisbi	23	
1954	Seven Samurai	104	
1955	Ordet	27	
1955	French Cancan	19	
1955	The Ladykillers	35	
1956	A Man Escaped	41	
1956	Night and Fog	25	
1957	12 Angry Men	61	
1957	Witness for the Prosecution	38	
1957	Nights of Cabiria	41	
1957	Old Yeller	18	
1957	Desk Set	24	
1958	Jalsaghar	23	
1958	Indiscreet	20	
1958	A Night to Remember	23	
1958	Room at the Top	22	
1959	Anatomy of a Murder	49	
1959	Shadows	21	
1960	Classe Tous Risques	29	
1961	Through a Glass Darkly	27	
1961	Victim	28	
1962	Ivan's Childhood	25	
1962	Sanjuro	27	
1964	I Am Cuba	38	
1964	Woman in the Dunes	29	
1966	The Endless Summer	21	
1966	Au hasard Balthazar	43	
1966	How the Grinch Stole Christmas!	27	
1967	Branded to Kill	25	
1967	Dragon Inn	26	
1967	Cool Hand Luke	52	
1967	Portrait of Jason	27	
1968	The Swimmer	25	
1969	Funeral Parade of Roses	22	
1969	Kes	31	
1969	The Sorrow and the Pity	31	
1969	Salesman	26	
1970	The Wild Child	22	
1970	Woodstock	25	
1970	Multiple Maniacs	23	
1972	Fat City	25	
1972	Winter Soldier	20	
1973	Sleeper	38	
1974	Ali: Fear Eats the Soul	41	
1975	Love and Death	26	
1975	Mirror	29	
1976	Harlan County, USA	23	
1977	The Many Adventures of Winnie the Pooh	18	
1978	The Buddy Holly Story	32	
1979	Stalker	46	
1980	Atlantic City	35	
1980	Breaker Morant	22	
1980	The King and the Mockingbird	22	
1980	Babylon	30	
1981	The Decline of Western Civilization	41	
1982	Fanny and Alexander	45	
1982	The Grey Fox	28	
1983	Local Hero	39	
1984	Broadway Danny Rose	28	
1984	Stop Making Sense	71	
1984	Sugar Cane Alley	41	
1984	Threads	17	
1984	Stranger Than Paradise	25	
1985	A Room with a View	35	
1985	My Life as a Dog	35	
1985	Shoah	37	
1985	Tampopo	57	
1985	Vagabond	26	
1987	Law of Desire	13	
1988	Grave of the Fireflies	49	
1989	A Grand Day Out	23	
1989	Roger & Me	30	
1990	Cyrano de Bergerac	26	
1990	The Juniper Tree	22	
1990	Ju Dou	23	
1991	La Belle Noiseuse	24	
1991	Rambling Rose	19	
1991	A Brighter Summer Day	26	
1991	Hearts of Darkness: A Filmmaker's Apocalypse	33	
1991	Only Yesterday	63	
1992	Rebels of the Neon God	34	
1992	Passion Fish	25	
1993	The Wrong Trousers	29	
1994	Three Colours: Red	60	
1994	Sátántangó	27	
1995	Before Sunrise	49	
1995	Maborosi	24	
1995	Toy Story	163	
1995	Forgotten Silver	10	
1995	A Close Shave	22	
1996	Paradise Lost: The Child Murders at Robin Hood Hills	24	
1997	4 Little Girls	23	
1999	Mr. Death: The Rise and Fall of Fred A. Leuchter, Jr.	36	
1999	My Voyage to Italy	19	
1999	Yana's Friends	30	
1999	Toy Story 2	171	
2000	Batman Beyond: Return of the Joker	10	
2002	Hukkle	30	
2004	Take Out	27	
2004	Twist of Faith	19	
2004	Live-In Maid	32	
2004	The Taste of Tea	22	
2005	Street Fight	22	
2005	I for India	21	
2005	C.R.A.Z.Y.	32	
2006	Fireworks Wednesday	45	
2006	Deliver Us from Evil	71	
2006	Half Moon	24	
2006	Kenny	26	
2007	Taxi to the Dark Side	93	
2007	Anita O'Day: The Life of a Jazz Singer	31	
2007	Moving Midway	25	
2008	The Order of Myths	32	
2008	Pray the Devil Back to Hell	34	
2008	Man on Wire	154	
2008	Still Walking	65	
2008	Sita Sings the Blues	32	
2008	Dreams with Sharp Teeth	20	
2009	Afghan Star	62	
2009	Last Train Home	54	
2009	Passing Strange	26	
2009	Racing Dreams	25	
2009	Henri-Georges Clouzot's Inferno	29	
2010	Enemies of the People	33	
2010	Waste Land	70	
2010	Nostalgia for the Light	48	
2010	Thunder Soul	28	
2010	Louder Than a Bomb	26	
2010	Into Eternity	27	
2010	Temple Grandin	31	
2011	Everyday Sunshine: The Story of Fishbone	52	
2011	Poetry	71	
2011	We Were Here	43	
2011	Wild Bill	24	
2011	Sholem Aleichem: Laughing in the Darkness	44	
2011	Planet of Snail	29	
2011	Hell and Back Again	31	
2011	The Snows of Kilimanjaro	20	
2012	It's Such a Beautiful Day	33	
2012	The Waiting Room	34	
2012	La Camioneta	22	
2012	More than Honey	40	
2012	Everything or Nothing	24	
2012	Fifi Howls from Happiness	21	
2013	Sound City	43	
2013	The Square	70	
2013	Ilo Ilo	45	
2013	Of Horses and Men	31	
2013	The Tale of the Princess Kaguya	95	
2013	Matt Shepard Is a Friend of Mine	30	
2013	God Loves Uganda	29	
2013	Rewind This!	19	
2013	Gloria	128	
2014	Maidan	26	
2014	Hilda	20	
2014	Gett: The Trial of Viviane Amsalem	78	
2014	Glen Campbell: I'll Be Me	31	
2014	Seymour: An Introduction	68	
2014	Tales of the Grim Sleeper	36	
2014	Kajaki: The True Story	28	
2014	Night Will Fall	24	
2014	Next Goal Wins	31	
2014	P'tit Quinquin	21	
2014	Rocks in My Pockets	23	
2014	Stray Dog	32	
2014	Democrats	23	
2014	The Oscar Nominated Short Films 2014: Animation	20	
2014	Virunga	22	
2014	The Circle	23	
2014	Christmas, Again	21	
2015	Older Than Ireland	26	
2015	Dreamcatcher	31	
2015	3 1/2 Minutes, 10 Bullets	49	
2015	SPL II: A Time for Consequences	21	
2015	Peace Officer	27	
2015	The Hard Stop	25	
2015	Sonita	24	
2015	Uncertain	22	
2015	The Dresser	14	
2015	Breaking a Monster	24	
2015	Don't Think I've Forgotten	24	
2016	Trapped	25	
2016	O.J.: Made in America	56	
2016	For the Love of Spock	30	
2016	Bright Lights: Starring Carrie Fisher and Debbie Reynolds	57	
2016	Chocolat	23	
2016	Harmonium	40	
2016	Seoul Station	24	
2016	California Typewriter	40	
2016	My Journey Through French Cinema	42	
2016	Starless Dreams	22	
2016	Chicken People	19	
2016	Peter and the Farm	30	
2016	Off the Rails	24	
2016	Nowhere to Hide	25	
2016	Tickling Giants	24	
2016	One More Time with Feeling	27	
2016	The Age of Shadows	49	
2016	The Young Offenders	23	
2016	Sky Ladder: The Art of Cai Guo-Qiang	24	
2016	Hotel Salvation	22	
2016	National Bird	22	
2016	The Islands and the Whales	22	
2016	Dawson City: Frozen Time	62	
2016	Cameraperson	106	
2017	Sammy Davis, Jr.: I've Gotta Be Me	20	
2017	Long Strange Trip	32	
2017	Chasing Coral	33	
2017	Strong Island	47	
2017	The Work	55	
2017	Mr. Roosevelt	35	
2017	The Departure	26	
2017	The Farthest	27	
2017	Bill Nye: Science Guy	26	
2017	Unrest	33	
2017	Destination Unknown	23	
2017	Let It Fall: Los Angeles 1982–1992	23	
2017	Keep the Change	29	
2017	Daphne	32	
2017	Earth: One Amazing Day	21	
2017	The Prince of Nothingwood	24	
2017	Summer 1993	93	
2017	En el séptimo día	31	
2017	King Cohen: The Wild World of Filmmaker Larry Cohen	35	
2017	Wajib	34	
2017	One Cut of the Dead	99	
2017	The Judge	27	
2017	Creep 2	30	
2017	Signature Move	21	
2017	Bad Genius	21	
2018	The Oscar Nominated Short Films 2018: Animation	23	
2018	Jesus Christ Superstar Live in Concert	27	
2018	Leave No Trace	248	
2018	Mercury 13	24	
2018	Hannah Gadsby: Nanette	49	
2018	Los Reyes	22	
2018	Maquia: When the Promised Flower Blooms	26	
2018	Minding the Gap	130	
2018	Chris Rock: Tamborine	23	
2018	Bathtubs Over Broadway	37	
2018	The World Before Your Feet	30	
2018	Half the Picture	21	
2018	A Bread Factory, Part One: For the Sake of Gold	30	
2018	A Bread Factory, Part Two: Walk with Me a While	22	
2018	An Impossible Love	20	
2018	Dead Souls	21	
2018	The Woman Who Loves Giraffes	30	
2018	The Bleeding Edge	21	
2018	The Spy Gone North	21	
2018	Ali Wong: Hard Knock Wife	21	
2018	John Mulaney: Kid Gorgeous at Radio City	20	
2018	Roll Red Roll	30	
2018	United Skates	20	
2018	Sharkwater Extinction	30	
2018	Penguin Highway	24	
2018	The Silence of Others	24	
2018	5B	21	
2018	Slut in a Good Way	20	
2018	Wolfman's Got Nards	22	
2019	Horror Noire	43	
2019	Emanuel	21	
2019	Honeyland	128	
2019	At the Heart of Gold: Inside the USA Gymnastics Scandal	27	
2019	The Load	28	
2019	Anima	21	
2019	General Magic	22	
2019	South Mountain	25	
2019	Invader Zim: Enter the Florpus	22	
2019	Other Music	20	
2019	Apocalypse Now: Final Cut	23	
2019	Mickey and the Bear	44	
2019	Mystify: Michael Hutchence	41	
2019	Vision Portraits	20	
2019	Fantastic Fungi	22	
2019	Slay the Dragon	48	
2019	Rewind	44	
2019	Chained for Life	52	
2019	Gay Chorus Deep South	23	
2019	Scream, Queen! My Nightmare on Elm Street	44	
2019	Martha: A Picture Story	24	
2019	Our Time Machine	23	
2019	Coup 53	44	
2019	Pahokee	22	
2019	Away	34	
2019	Queer Japan	23	
2019	Diana Kennedy: Nothing Fancy	32	
2019	Inmate 1: The Rise of Danny Trejo	32	
2019	Everybody's Everything	21	
2019	This Is Not a Movie	22	
2019	White Riot	50	
2019	17 Blocks	28	
2019	So Long, My Son	36	
2019	Oliver Sacks: His Own Life	30	
2019	Changing the Game	41	
2019	Perfumes	24	
2019	Suk Suk	22	
2019	Bait	40	
2020	A Secret Love	46	
2020	2040	32	
2020	Athlete A	60	
2020	Mucho Mucho Amor: The Legend of Walter Mercado	66	
2020	Welcome to Chechnya	74	
2020	Crip Camp	100	
2020	Suzi Q	29	
2020	A Thousand Cuts	42	
2020	All In: The Fight for Democracy	66	
2020	Jacinta	25	
2020	76 Days	99	
2020	His House	128	
2020	Quo Vadis, Aida?	82	
2020	Coded Bias	49	
2020	Mayor	43	
2020	Can You Bring It: Bill T. Jones and D-Man in the Waters	23	
2020	A Crime on the Bayou	24	
2020	I Will Make You Mine	21	
2020	Born to Be	20	
2020	Finding Yingying	26	
2020	Freeland	25	
2020	Slalom	57	
2020	Acasă, My Home	41	
2020	Eyimofe	23	
2020	Nowhere Special	65	
2020	Stuntwomen: The Untold Hollywood Story	21	
2020	Film About a Father Who	20	
2021	Introducing, Selma Blair	38	
2021	Paper Spiders	42	
2021	The Dog Who Wouldn't Be Quiet	30	
2021	Cousins	23	
2021	Sabaya	47	
2021	Miracle	23	
2021	Hive	75	
2021	Wildhood	37	
2021	The Summit of the Gods	35	
2021	This Is Not a War Story	11	
2021	Writing with Fire	52	
2021	Three Minutes: A Lengthening	55	
2021	Blind Ambition	31	
2021	Not Going Quietly	22	
2021	The Janes	67	
2021	This Is GWAR	20	
2021	Playground	63	
2021	The Velvet Queen	46	
2021	The Witcher: Nightmare of the Wolf	28	
2021	Lady Boss: The Jackie Collins Story	22	
2021	Woodlands Dark and Days Bewitched: A History of Folk Horror	47	
2021	Brother's Keeper	21	
2021	Evangelion: 3.0+1.0 Thrice Upon a Time	29	
2021	Attica	56	
2021	East of the Mountains	21	
2021	Make Me Famous	41	
2021	Under the Fig Trees	26	
2021	Batman: The Long Halloween, Part One	21	
2021	Carmen	24	
2022	Gabby Giffords Won't Back Down	47	
2022	Bruiser	25	
2022	Free Chol Soo Lee	42	
2022	Descendant	69	
2022	Aftershock	28	
2022	The Worst Ones	27	
2022	This Much I Know to Be True	39	
2022	Is That Black Enough for You?!?	43	
2022	We Feed People	27	
2022	The Pez Outlaw	32	
2022	Belle Vie	7	
2022	The First Slam Dunk	47	
2022	Bobi Wine: The People's President	42	
2022	Lakota Nation vs. United States	24	
2022	Personality Crisis: One Night Only	24	
2022	Ernest & Celestine: A Trip to Gibberitia	25	
2022	The Novelist's Film	29	
2022	Murder, Anyone?	9	
2023	The Disappearance of Shere Hite	61	
2023	20 Days in Mariupol	71	
2023	Close to Vermeer	21	
2023	Bad Press	37	
2023	Big Boys	31	
2023	Animalia	28	
2023	Beyond Utopia	58	
2023	A Disturbance in the Force	49	
2023	Stamped from the Beginning	29	
2023	Menus-Plaisirs – Les Troisgros	56	
2023	Concrete Utopia	63	
2023	Our Body	26	
2023	Inshallah a Boy	28	
2023	Uproar	25	
2023	Ryuichi Sakamoto: Opus	33	
2023	Milli Vanilli	25	
2023	Where the Devil Roams	41	
2023	Invisible Beauty	23	
2023	Mars Express	28	
2023	In Our Day	32	
2023	Bye Bye Tiberias	25	
2023	The Mother of All Lies	38	
2023	Chuck Chuck Baby	28	
2023	The Echo	24	
2023	Suze	29	
2023	Chronicles of a Wandering Saint	32	
2023	River	26	
2024	Girls Will Be Girls	61	
2024	All We Imagine as Light	158	
2024	Laapataa Ladies	25	
2024	I Am: Celine Dion	45	
2024	Àma Gloria	23	
2024	Daughters	71	
2024	Sugarcane	68	
2024	On Becoming a Guinea Fowl	104	
2024	High Tide	25	
2024	My Favourite Cake	39	
2024	The Truth vs. Alex Jones	24	
2024	No Other Land	105	
2024	Eephus	89	
2024	Music by John Williams	49	
2024	Wallace & Gromit: Vengeance Most Fowl	138	
2024	Kiss the Future	21	
2024	Santosh	59	
2024	Look Back	26	
2024	By the Stream	31	
2024	Mountain Queen: The Summits of Lhakpa Sherpa	22	
2024	Souleymane's Story	63	
2024	The G	41	
2024	To Kill a Wolf	27	
2024	The Kingdom	27	
2024	My Undesirable Friends: Part I — Last Air in Moscow	37	
2024	Dreams in Nightmares	26	
2024	Swamp Dogg Gets His Pool Painted	25	
2024	Twiggy	25	
2025	Deaf President Now!	47	
2025	Blue Sun Palace	23	
2025	Jaws @ 50: The Definitive Inside Story	25	
2025	Sudan, Remember Us	23	
2025	Teenage Wasteland	32	
2025	All That's Left of You	65	
2025	The Alabama Solution	31	
2025	Come See Me in the Good Light	54	
2025	Cutting Through Rocks	31	
2025	Mr Nobody Against Putin	53	
2025	Love+War	22	
2025	My Mom Jayne	37	
2025	Kill Bill: The Whole Bloody Affair	37	
2025	A Poet	56	
2025	BLKNWS: Terms & Conditions	23	
2025	Man on the Run	69	
2025	Wasteman	53	
2025	Mārama	49	
2025	1000 Women in Horror	21	
2025	Living the Land	27	
2025	Underland	29	
2025	She's the He	40	
2025	A Sad and Beautiful World	24	
2025	Hen	32	
2026	Once Upon a Time in Harlem	85	
2026	Everybody to Kenmure Street	45	
2026	The Friend's House Is Here	21	
2026	Extra Geography	33	
2026	Barbara Forever	36	
2026	Wild Inside	27	
2026	American Doctor	51	
2026	Big Girls Don't Cry	31	
2026	Black Zombie	47	
2026	How to Divorce During the War	30	
2026	One in a Million	25	
2026	Everybody Digs Bill Evans	26	
2026	Tender Loving Care	49	
2026	The Last Picture Shows	22	
2026	NAZA	83	
2026	Making Marie Antoinette	40	
2026	Mouse	82	
2026	Iron Boy	20	

== See also ==
- List of films considered the best
- Lists of films considered the worst
- List of films with a 0% rating on Rotten Tomatoes
- AFI's 100 Years...100 Movies (10th Anniversary Edition)
