= 2026 Sundance Film Festival =

Edition of film festival

- Location: Park City, Utah and Salt Lake City, Utah
- Founded: 1978
- Hosted by: Sundance Institute
- Festival date: January 22 – February 1, 2026
- Language: English
- Website: festival.sundance.org

Sundance Film Festival
- 2027 Sundance Film Festival 2025 Sundance Film Festival

The 2026 Sundance Film Festival took place in Park City and Salt Lake City, Utah from January 22 to February 1, 2026. Film premieres at the festival were held from January 22 to January 27, 2026. The first selection lineup was announced on December 10, 2025. The festival would be the last Sundance Film Festival held in Utah before the festival relocates to Boulder, Colorado in 2027. Several films notably received standing ovations during the festival, including Fing, Josephine, Wicker, The Invite, Levitating, and Union County.

== Films ==
=== U.S. Dramatic Competition ===
English title	Director(s)	Production Country
Bedford Park	Stephanie Ahn	United States
Carousel	Rachel Lambert	United States
The Friend's House Is Here	Hossein Keshavarz, Maryam Ataei	United States, Iran
Ha-Chan, Shake Your Booty!	Josef Kubota Wladyka	United States
Hot Water	Ramzi Bashour	United States
Josephine	Beth de Araújo	United States
The Musical	Giselle Bonilla	United States
Run Amok	NB Mager	United States
Take Me Home	Liz Sargent	United States
Union County	Adam Meeks	United States

=== World Cinema Dramatic Competition ===
English title	Original title	Director(s)	Production Country
Big Girls Don't Cry		Paloma Schneideman	New Zealand
Extra Geography		Molly Manners	United Kingdom
Filipiñana		Rafael Manuel	Singapore, United Kingdom, Philippines, France, Netherlands
Hold onto Me	Κράτα Με	Myrsini Aristidou	Cyprus, Denmark, Greece
How to Divorce During the War	Skyrybos karo metu	Andrius Blaževičius	Lithuania, Luxembourg, Ireland, Czech Republic
The Huntress	La Cazadora	Suzanne Andrews Correa	Mexico, United States
LADY		Olive Nwosu	United Kingdom, Nigeria
Levitating	Para Perasuk	Wregas Bhanuteja	Indonesia, Singapore, France
Shame and Money		Visar Morina	Germany, Kosovo, Slovenia, Albania, North Macedonia, Belgium
Tell Me Everything	עצמאות	Moshe Rosenthal	Israel, France

=== U.S. Documentary Competition ===
English title	Director(s)	Production Country
American Doctor	Poh Si Teng	United States, State of Palestine, Malaysia, Qatar
American Pachuco: The Legend of Luis Valdez	David Alvarado	United States
Barbara Forever	Brydie O'Connor	United States
Joybubbles	Rachael J. Morrison	United States
The Lake	Abby Ellis	United States
Nuisance Bear	Gabriela Osio Vanden, Jack Weisman	United States, Canada
Public Access	David Shadrack Smith	United States
Seized	Sharon Liese	United States
Soul Patrol	J.M. Harper	United States
Who Killed Alex Odeh?	Jason Osder and William Lafi Youmans	United States

=== World Cinema Documentary Competition ===
English title	Director(s)	Production Country
All About the Money	Sinéad O'Shea	Ireland
Birds of War	Janay Boulos and Abd Alkader Habak	United Kingdom, Syrian Arab Republic, Lebanon
Closure	Michał Marczak	Poland
Everybody to Kenmure Street	Felipe Bustos Sierra	United Kingdom
Hanging by a Wire	Mohammed Ali Naqvi	United States, United Kingdom, Pakistan
Kikuyu Land	Andrew H. Brown and Bea Wangondu	Kenya
One in a Million	Itab Azzam, Jack MacInnes	United Kingdom
Sentient	Tony Jones	Australia
Silenced	Selina Miles	Australia
To Hold a Mountain	Biljana Tutorov and Petar Glomazić	Serbia, France, Montenegro, Slovenia, Croatia

=== Premieres ===
English title	Original title	Director(s)	Production Country
The AI Doc: Or How I Became an Apocaloptimist		Daniel Roher, Charlie Tyrell	United States
Antiheroine		Edward Lovelace and James Hall	United Kingdom, United States
The Brittney Griner Story		Alexandria Stapleton	United States
Chasing Summer		Josephine Decker	United States
THE DISCIPLE		Joanna Natasegara	United Kingdom, United States
Frank & Louis		Petra Biondina Volpe	Switzerland, United Kingdom
Gail Daughtry and the Celebrity Sex Pass		David Wain	United States
The Gallerist		Cathy Yan	United States
Give Me the Ball!		Liz Garbus and Elizabeth Wolff	United States
The History of Concrete		John Wilson	United States
I Want Your Sex		Gregg Araki	United States
Idiots (premiered as The Shitheads)		Macon Blair	United States
In The Blink of an Eye		Andrew Stanton	United States
The Invite		Olivia Wilde	United States
Jane Elliott Against the World		Judd Ehrlich	United States
Knife: The Attempted Murder of Salman Rushdie		Alex Gibney	United States
The Last First: Winter K2		Amir Bar-Lev	United Kingdom, United States
The Moment		Aidan Zamiri	United States
The Oldest Person in the World		Sam Green	United States
Once Upon a Time in Harlem		William Greaves, David Greaves	United States
The Only Living Pickpocket in New York		Noah Segan	United States
Paralyzed by Hope: The Maria Bamford Story		Judd Apatow, Neil Berkeley	United States
Queen of Chess		Rory Kennedy	United States
See You When I See You		Jay Duplass	United States
Time and Water		Sara Dosa	United States, Iceland
Troublemaker: The Story Behind the Mandela Tapes		Antoine Fuqua	South Africa, United States, United Kingdom
The Weight		Padraic McKinley	United States, Germany
When a Witness Recants		Dawn Porter	United States
Wicker		Eleanor Wilson, Alex Huston Fischer	United States, United Kingdom

=== Next ===
English title	Original title	Director(s)	Production Country
Aanikoobijigan [ancestor/great-grandparent/great-grandchild]		Adam Khalil, Zack Khalil	United States, Denmark
Burn	炎上	Makoto Nagahisa	Japan
Ghost in the Machine		Valerie Veatch	United States
If I Go Will They Miss Me		Walter Thompson-Hernández	United States
The Incomer		Louis Paxton	United Kingdom
Jaripeo		Efraín Mojica, Rebecca Zweig	Mexico, United States, France
Night Nurse		Georgia Bernstein	United States
TheyDream		William D. Caballero	United States
Zi		Kogonada	United States

=== Midnight ===
English title	Director(s)	Production Country
The Best Summer	Tamra Davis	United States, Australia, Indonesia
Buddy	Casper Kelly	United States
Leviticus	Adrian Chiarella	Australia
Mum, I'm Alien Pregnant	THUNDERLIPS	New Zealand
Rock Springs	Vera Miao	United States, Canada
Saccharine	Natalie Erika James	Australia
undertone	Ian Tuason	Canada

=== Episodic ===
English title	Director(s)	Production Country
Bait	Bassam Tariq	United Kingdom
Episodic Fiction Pilot Showcase	Various	United States
Episodic Nonfiction Pilot Showcase	Various	United States
FreeLance	The Turner Brothers	United States
Murder 101	Stacy Lee	United States
The Oligarch and the Art Dealer	Andreas Dalsgaard	Denmark, France
The Screener	Jim Cummings and PJ McCabe	United States
Soft Boil		United States
Worried		United States

=== Family Matinee ===
English title	Director(s)	Production Country
Cookie Queens	Alysa Nahmias	United States
Fing!	Jeffrey Walker	United Kingdom

=== U.S. Fiction Short Films ===
English title	Director(s)	Production Country
Albatross	Amandine Thomas	United States
Balloon Animals	Anna Baumgarten	United States
Birdie	Praise Odigie Paige	United States
Callback	Matthew Puccini	United States
The Creature of Darkness	Lisa Malloy, Ray Whitaker	United States
Crisis Actor	Lily Platt	United States
Don't Tell Mama	Chloe Leigh King	United States
Gender Studies	Jamie Kiernan O’Brien	United States
The Oracle	JJ Adler	United States
Pankaja	Anooya Swamy	United States, India
Prime	Meagan Coyle	United States
Radiant Frost	Hannah Schierbeek	United States
Seniors	Adam Curley	United States
Stairs	Riley Donigan	United States
Taga	Jill Marie Sachs	United States, Philippines
Together Forever	Gregory Barnes	United States

=== International Fiction Short Films ===
English title	Director(s)	Production Country
Agnes	Leah Vlemmiks	United Kingdom, Canada
Blue Heart	Samuel Suffren	Haiti, France
Candy Bar	Nash Edgerton	Australia
Faux Bijoux	Jessy Moussallem	France, Lebanon
Fruit (Buah)	Jen Nee Lim	Singapore
How Brief	Kelly McCormack	Canada
I'm Glad You're Dead Now	Tawfeek Barhom	France, Greece, Palestine
Ivar	Markus Tangre	Norway
Jazz Infernal	Will Niava	Canada
The Liars	Eduardo Braun Costa	Argentina
Marga en el DF	Gabriela Ortega	Mexico, United States
Norheimsund	Ana A. Alpizar	Cuba, United States
O’Sey Balamma	Raman Nimmala	India
¡PIKA!	Alex Fischman Cárdenas	Peru
Sauna Sickness	Malin Barr	Sweden
Without Kelly (Utan Kelly)	Lovisa Sirén	Sweden
The Worm	Tom Noakes	Australia

=== Animated Short Films ===
English title	Director(s)	Production Country
1981	Andy London, Carolyn London	United States
The Bird’s Placebo	Rami Jarboui	Tunisia
Busy Bodies	Kate Renshaw-Lewis	United States
Cabbage Daddy	Grace An	Canada
Homemade Gatorade	Carter Amelia Davis	United States
HUGS	Nicolas Fong	Belgium
The Gnawer of Rocks (Mangittatuarjuk)	Louise Flaherty	Canada
Living with a Visionary	Stephen P. Neary	United States
Once in a Body	María Cristina Pérez	Colombia, United States
Paper Trail	Don Hertzfeldt	United States
Sorrow Doesn't Sleep at Night	Josefina Montino, Martín André	Chile
UM	Nieto	France

=== Nonfiction Short Films ===
English title	Director(s)	Production Country
The Baddest Speechwriter of All	Ben Proudfoot, Stephen Curry	United States
The Boys and the Bees	Arielle C. Knight	United States
The Chimney Sweeper	Jack Raese	United States
Going Sane: The Rise and Fall of the Center For Feeling Therapy	Joey Izzo	United States
The Home of the Brave (La Tierra del Valor)	Cristina Costantini	United States
Luigi	Liza Mandelup	United States
Some Kind of Refuge	Alexandra Kern	United States
Still Standing	Victor Tadashi Suarez, Livia Albeck-Ripka	United States
Tuktuit : Caribou	Lindsay Aksarniq McIntyre	Canada

=== Special Screenings ===
To commemorate the final Sundance in Park City, the 2026 festival will include several special screenings of classic films that screened at festivals in years past, along with the 1969 film Downhill Racer as a tribute to founder Robert Redford, who died in September 2025.

Title	Director(s)	Production Country	Year
American Dream	Barbara Kopple	United States, United Kingdom	1990
Downhill Racer	Michael Ritchie	United States	1969
Half Nelson	Ryan Fleck	United States	2006
House Party	Reginald Hudlin	United States	1990
Humpday	Lynn Shelton	United States	2009
Little Miss Sunshine	Jonathan Dayton, Valerie Faris	United States	2006
Mysterious Skin	Gregg Araki	United States, Netherlands	2004
Saw	James Wan	United States	2004

== Awards ==
For the last time in Park City, the following awards were given out:

=== Grand Jury Prizes ===
- U.S. Dramatic: Josephine (Beth de Araújo)
- U.S. Documentary: Nuisance Bear (Gabriela Osio Vanden and Jack Weisman)
- World Cinema Dramatic: Shame and Money (Visar Morina)
- World Cinema Documentary: To Hold a Mountain (Biljana Tutorov and Petar Glomazić)
- Short Films: The Baddest Speechwriter of All (Ben Proudfoot and Stephen Curry)

=== Audience Awards ===
- U.S. Dramatic: Josephine (Beth de Araújo)
- U.S. Documentary: American Pachuco: The Legend of Luis Valdez (David Alvarado)
- World Cinema Dramatic: Hold onto Me (Myrsini Aristidou)
- World Cinema Documentary: One In A Million (Itab Azzam and Jack MacInnes)
- NEXT: Aanikoobijigan [ancestor/great-grandparent/great-grandchild] (Adam Khalil and Zack Khalil)

=== Directing, Editing, and Screenwriting Prizes ===
- U.S. Dramatic Directing Award: Josef Kubota Wladyka for Ha-chan, Shake Your Booty!
- U.S. Documentary Directing Award: J.M. Harper for Soul Patrol
- World Cinema Dramatic Directing Award: Andrius Blaževičius for How to Divorce During the War
- World Cinema Documentary Directing Award: Itab Azzam and Jack MacInnes for One In A Million
- Jonathan Oppenheim Editing Award: Matt Hixon for Barbara Forever
- Waldo Salt Screenwriting Award: U.S. Dramatic: Liz Sargent for Take Me Home
- NEXT Innovator Award: The Incomer (Louis Paxton)

=== Special Jury Awards ===
- U.S. Dramatic Special Jury Award for Ensemble Cast: the cast of The Friend's House Is Here
- U.S. Dramatic Special Jury Award for Debut Feature: Bedford Park
- U.S. Documentary Special Jury Award for Journalistic Excellence: Who Killed Alex Odeh?
- U.S. Documentary Special Jury Award for Impact for Change: The Lake
- World Cinema Dramatic Special Jury Award for Creative Vision: Filipiñana
- World Cinema Dramatic Special Jury Award for Acting Ensemble: LADY
- World Cinema Documentary Special Jury Award for Journalistic Impact: Birds of War
- World Cinema Documentary Special Jury Award for Civil Resistance: Everybody To Kenmure Street
- NEXT Special Jury Award for Creative Expression: TheyDream
- Short Film Special Jury Award for Acting: Noah Roja and Filippo Carrozza for The Liars
- Short Film Special Jury Award for Creative Vision: Paper Trail

=== Shorts Program Awards ===
- U.S. Fiction: Crisis Actor (Lily Platt)
- Animation: Living with a Visionary (Stephen P. Neary)
- Nonfiction: The Boys and the Bees (Arielle C. Knight)
- International Fiction: Jazz Infernal (Will Niava)

=== Sundance Institute Awards ===
- Producers Award for Nonfiction (presented by Amazon MGM Studios): Dawne Langford for Who Killed Alex Odeh?
- NHK Award: Leo Aguirre for Verano
- Alfred P. Sloan Feature Film Prize: Andrew Stanton In The Blink of An Eye
- Adobe Mentorship Award for Nonfiction: Flavia de Souza
- Adobe Mentorship Award for Fiction: Mollie Goldstein

== Acquisitions ==
- Saccharine: Independent Film Company and Shudder
- Leviticus: Neon
- The Invite: A24
- Ha-Chan, Shake Your Booty!: Sony Pictures Classics
- Bedford Park: Sony Pictures Classics
- Once Upon a Time in Harlem: Neon
- The Last First: Winter K2: Apple Original Films
- I Want Your Sex: Magnolia Pictures
- Filipiñana: Kino Lorber
- The Baddest Speechwriter of All: Netflix
- Josephine: Sumerian Pictures
- Wicker: Black Bear Pictures
- The Only Living Pickpocket in New York: Sony Pictures Classics
- Idiots: Independent Film Company
- The Incomer: Sumerian Pictures (United States), Focus Features (International)
- Everybody to Kenmure Street: Icarus Films
- Gail Daughtry and the Celebrity Sex Pass: Sony Pictures Classics
- If I Go Will They Miss Me: Rich Spirit
- Cookie Queens: Roadside Attractions
- Ghost in the Machine: Independent Lens
- The Weight: Vertical
- The History of Concrete: Magnolia Pictures
- Hot Water: Rich Spirit
- Union County: Oscilloscope Laboratories
- Buddy: Roadside Attractions and Saban Films
- American Doctor: Watermelon Pictures
- The Friend's House Is Here: Greenwich Entertainment
- Time and Water: National Geographic Documentary Films
- How to Divorce During the War: Zeitgeist Films and Kino Lorber
- Nuisance Bear: Mubi
- Fing!: Angel Studios
- American Pachuco: The Legend of Luis Valdez: Strand Releasing
- Take Me Home: Willa
- Night Nurse: Independent Film Company
- Zi: Grasshopper Film
- Soul Patrol: Kino Lorber
- Lady: Cohen Media Group
- The Story of Documentary Film: Kino Lorber
- Knife: The Attempted Murder of Salman Rushdie: Abramorama
- Hanging by a Wire: Abramorama
- The Musical: Variance Films and Blue Harbor Entertainment
- The Gallerist: Roadside Attractions and Vertical
- Run Amok: Greenwich Entertainment
- Closure: 1-2 Special
- Chasing Summer: Magenta Light Studios
