= 1981 (disambiguation) =

1981 was a common year starting on Thursday of the Gregorian calendar.

1981 may also refer to:

- 1981 (2009 film), a film by Ricardo Trogi
- 1981 (2025 film), an American animated short film by Andy London and Carolyn London
- "1981" (song), a song by Gyroscope
- "1981", a song by Green Day, from their 2024 album Saviors
- H.R. 1981, the Protecting Children from Internet Pornographers Act of 2011
