= Jonathan Cairney =

Scottish musician and actor (born 1971)

Jonathan Cairney (born 1971) is a Scottish musician and actor. He is best known for his performances in the satirical news programme Dateline Scotland and its successor Dateline 2018.

Cairney is originally from the Scottish town of Dunfermline, and is the son of the actor John Cairney. He studied Social and Political Sciences at King's College, Cambridge. In 1999 he was awarded the Perrier Young Jazz Singer Award, and has performed regularly with the National Youth Jazz Orchestra. He was also a regular frontman for the 11-piece Big Buzzard Boogie Band.

In 2014, Cairney appeared in an official video for Yes Scotland, during the Scottish independence referendum. He was a cast member in the satirical news satire Dateline Scotland, playing the role of George Deary, the fictional "head of strategy" for Better Together (the campaign opposed to Scottish independence during 2014). In 2016, Cairney reprised his role for the spin-off series Dateline 2018, playing various different characters. He is also credited as one of the show's writers.

In 2017, he co-wrote the biographical play Jocky Wilson Said, about the Scottish darts champion Jocky Wilson, played by Grant O'Rourke.
