= The Best Summer =

2026 documentary film

- Directed by: Tamra Davis
- Produced by: Tamra Davis; Shelby Meade
- Cinematography: Tamra Davis
- Edited by: Jessica Hernandez
- Release date: January 24, 2026 (Sundance)
- Running time: 90 minutes
- Country: United States
- Language: English

The Best Summer is a 2026 documentary film directed, produced, and shot by Tamra Davis, with Shelby Meade as producer and Linda Lichter as executive producer. The film documents the Summersault festival tour in Australia in late 1995 and early 1996, featuring performances and backstage footage of bands including the Beastie Boys, Sonic Youth, Foo Fighters, Pavement, Rancid, Beck, The Amps, and Bikini Kill. It had its world premiere in the Midnight section at the 2026 Sundance Film Festival.

== Premise ==
The film presents point-of-view concert footage and backstage material from the Summersault festival, a Lollapalooza-style touring festival across Australia organized by promoter Stephen "Pav" Pavolic. Davis is joined by Bikini Kill's Kathleen Hanna, who co-conducts informal backstage interviews with the musicians.

The film also captures the early stages of the relationship between Hanna and Beastie Boys member Ad-Rock (Adam Horovitz). (The pair would become a couple shortly after the tour and marry in 2006.) The later portion of the film follows several of the bands as they continue to MTV-sponsored dates in Southeast Asia, including Indonesia, Thailand, and Singapore, where the Beastie Boys had been banned from performing.

== Production ==
=== Background ===
At the time of the tour, Davis had recently finished directing Billy Madison (1995). She had also directed music videos for several of the bands on the bill, including Sonic Youth's clips for "100%" and "Bull in the Heather", the latter of which featured Hanna. Davis had recently married Beastie Boys drummer Michael Diamond (Mike D), and joined the tour with her cameras. Bikini Kill were added to the Summersault lineup at Davis and Diamond's recommendation to the festival promoter.

=== Footage discovery and assembly ===
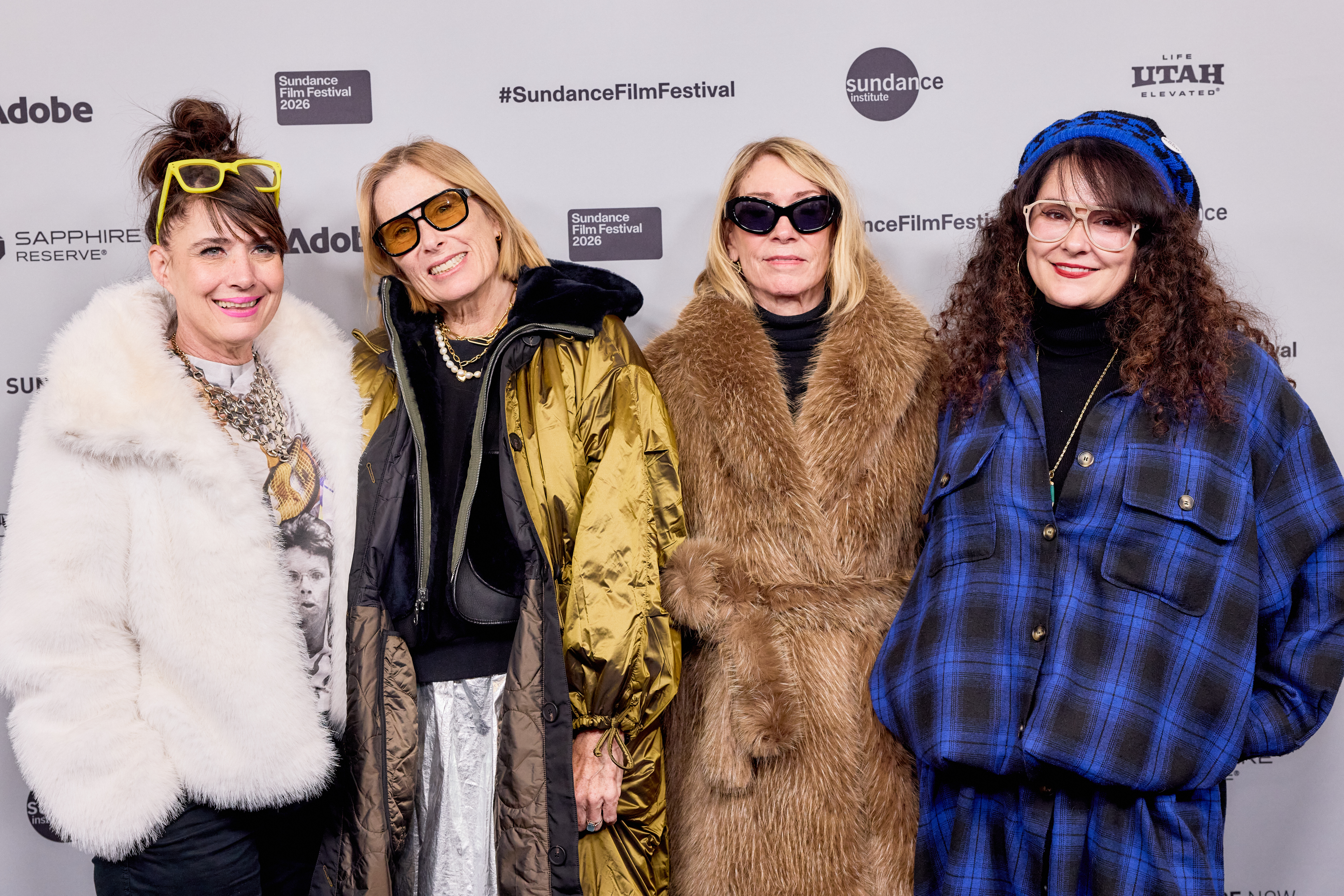
Kathleen Hanna, Tamra Davis, Kim Gordon, and Jessica Hernández at the 2026 Sundance Film Festival

Davis shot the footage on Sony Hi8 camcorders throughout the tour but put the unmarked tapes in storage upon returning home. The tapes remained in boxes at her Malibu home for nearly 30 years until she rediscovered them in January 2025 while evacuating during the Palisades fires.

Davis chose not to include present-day interviews or voiceover narration. Kim Gordon, the first person shown the film, advised her to remove planned commentary, telling her not to bring a voice "from the future" into the past. The concert audio comes from the built-in microphone on Davis's camcorder and is largely unaltered, while some post-production cleanup was done on the interview footage using modern audio tools. Davis worked with editor Jessica Hernandez to assemble the film.

Davis self-financed the production to avoid studio notes and maintain creative control, taking feedback only from the musicians themselves.

== Release ==
The Best Summer premiered in the Midnight section of the 2026 Sundance Film Festival.

== Reception ==
Anna Smith of Rolling Stone UK gave the film three out of five stars, calling it a "fascinating, nostalgic insight into these iconic bands in their youth" Matt Melis of The A.V. Club gave it a B−, praising Davis's concert footage and her emphasis on the women of the tour, but noted that the film made it difficult for viewers who weren't there to fully connect with the material. In Salt Lake Magazine, Aura Martinez described the film as "a love letter to a time when everything felt bright and impossibly alive."
