= The Musical (2026 film) =

2026 comedy film by Giselle Bonilla

- Theatrical release poster
- Directed by: Giselle Bonilla
- Written by: Alexander Heller
- Produced by: Rob Lowe; Greg Lauritano; Alexander Heller; Findlay Brown; Jordan Backhus
- Starring: Will Brill; Gillian Jacobs; Rob Lowe
- Cinematography: Tu Do
- Edited by: Chris Chandler; Devin Dulany
- Music by: Mateo Nossa
- Production companies: Megamix; Unapologetic Projects
- Distributed by: Blue Harbor Entertainment; Variance Films
- Release dates: January 25, 2026 (Sundance Film Festival); September 18, 2026 (United States)
- Running time: 87 minutes
- Country: United States
- Language: English
- Box office: $225,772

The Musical is a 2026 American comedy film directed by Giselle Bonilla in her feature directorial debut. The screenplay is written by Alexander Heller. The film stars Will Brill, Gillian Jacobs, and Rob Lowe (who also produces the film).

It premiered in the U.S. Dramatic Competition at the 2026 Sundance Film Festival on January 25, 2026.

== Plot ==
Doug Leibowitz is a frustrated playwright and middle school theater teacher who dreams of moving to New York City. At the beginning of a new school year, he discovers that his ex-girlfriend, art teacher Abigail, has started dating Principal Brady. Frustrated professionally and personally, Doug decides to derail Principal Brady's hopes of winning a Blue Ribbon of Academic Excellence for the school by switching the school play that semester from West Side Story to The Heroes, a play he has written about the September 11th terrorist attacks. He swears his pupils to secrecy, telling them that surprise is a key element of theater, and later that they are fighting against "the Machine" trying to keep them down.

Learning that Doug cast Cindy, who is white, in the role of Maria in West Side Story, Principal Brady forces Doug to switch the lead role to Lata, a Latina student, and also insists on watching the rehearsals. To maintain his deception, Doug inspires the cast to learn West Side Story simultaneously, with the students practicing the real play in the morning and the sham play in the afternoon for Principal Brady's benefit. Although Doug has a mental breakdown and takes a leave of absence from school, he is inspired to come back by a letter from one of his students. Doug insists Principal Brady give an introduction to the play on opening night, which is attended by a local reporter whom Doug has tipped off. After briefly beginning with West Side Story, Lata appears on stage as Rudy Giuliani and the Twin Towers appear in the background, with the play’s narrative being that Giuliani orchestrated the attacks himself to boost his popularity. Doug clears out his office while the play horrifies the audience. As he is escorted off school grounds by security, he and his cast exchange salutes.

One year later, Doug is living in New York City, working a service job while developing a play based on his life at the middle school. While he is in a relationship with the actress playing the Abigail role, he notices the Doug character touching her in a familiar way. The film ends with him glowering at them in the mirror.

== Cast ==
- Will Brill as Doug Leibowitz
- Gillian Jacobs as Abigail
- Rob Lowe as Principal Brady
- Devin Villarreal as Piano Kid
- Nevada Jose as Little Mikey Gomez (LMG)
- Michael Strassner as Carson
- Melanie Herrera as Lata
- Chyler Emery Stern as Cindy
- Cayden Romero as Brian
- Karen Maruyama as Mrs. Belkin
- Aidyn Ahn as Abel

== Production ==
The film is directed by Giselle Bonilla, an alumnus of the AFI Conservatory and the Sundance Institute Ignite Fellowship. The screenplay was written by Alexander Heller. The project is produced by Rob Lowe alongside Greg Lauritano, Findlay Brown, and Jordan Backhus.

The film features Tony Award-winning actor Will Brill in the lead role, supported by Lowe and Gillian Jacobs.

== Release ==
The Musical was selected for the U.S. Dramatic Competition at the 2026 Sundance Film Festival, where it had its world premiere during the festival's run from January 22 to February 1, 2026. It was released in the United States on September 18, 2026.

The Musical received a Fresh rating from Rotten Tomatoes, with 61% of critics giving it a positive review. On Metacritic, the film has an average rating of 60/100 across ten reviews.
