= Giselle Bonilla =

American actress

- Born: October 28, 1994 (age 32); Los Angeles, California, U.S.
- Occupations: Actress; director
- Years active: 2006–present

Giselle Bonilla (born October 28, 1994) is an American actress and director. She portrayed Maria in the sitcom Mr. Box Office.

== Career ==
She has appeared in many television series, including a recurring role in Southland. She has also helped advertise many campaigns including YMI Jeans, Verizon Wireless, and an anti-smoking campaign. On May 7, 2012, she joined the cast of the series Mr. Box Office.

Her feature film directorial debut, The Musical, premiered at the 2026 Sundance Film Festival.

== Personal life ==
She enjoys playing basketball and swimming.

== Filmography ==
Film
Year	Title	Role	Notes
2006	Hollywood Familia	Young Francesca	
2007	Freedom Writers	Young Eva	
2007	Trade	ADR / voice	
2008	Linewatch	ADR / voice	
2013	The Obama Effect	Maria Santiago	
2013	Foreign Land	Amelia	
2014	The Secret Place	Stephanie	

Television
Year	Title	Role	Notes
2007	Journeyman	Micaela	Episode: "Emily"
2011	Off the Map	Sofia Sanchez	Episode: "Smile. Don't Kill Anyone."
2011	Southland	Rosie Montoya	Episode: "Code 4"
2011	Supah Ninjas	Kelly	12 episodes
2013	Mr. Box Office	Maria	22 episodes
2014	Workaholics	Luna	Episode: "Miss BS"
2018	Grey's Anatomy	Sarah Maurer	Episode: "Games People Play"
