= William D. Caballero =

American filmmaker, writer, and composer

- Born: Coney Island, Brooklyn, New York City
- Education: Pratt Institute (BFA); New York University (MA)
- Occupation: Filmmaker

William David Caballero is an American multimedia filmmaker known for his often autobiographical work that explores issues of identity through animation and miniatures.

== Early life and education ==
Caballero was born in Coney Island to Puerto Rican parents and raised in Fayetteville, North Carolina, where he lived in trailer park. He was awarded the Bill Gates Millennium Scholarship in 2001. He graduated from the Pratt Institute in 2006, where he majored in digital art and minored in art history. He earned a master's degree from New York University in 2008.

== Career ==
In 2010, Caballero's feature-length debut American Dreams Deferred premiered at the New York International Latino Film Festival, and he was commissioned by the Apollo Theater to create Speak! So The World Will Listen! Uganda, a multimedia concert with testimony from child soldiers in the country. His 2013 short film Seed Story, his first work using miniatures, debuted at the Slamdance Film Festival. That same year, Caballero released the short film How You Doin', Boy? Voicemails from Gran'Pa inspired by voicemail messages from his grandfather. This project evolved into the webseries Gran’pa Knows Best, which was acquired by HBO Latino in 2015.

Caballero was awarded a Guggenheim Fellowship in 2018. His autobiographical shorts Victor and Isolina, inspired by his grandmother, and Chilly and Milly, inspired by his parents, debuted at the Sundance Film Festival in 2017 and 2022, respectively. The latter aired on the PBS series POV Shorts in 2023. He produced two episodes of the A Little Off the Top webseries in 2023, the second of which was created to promote COVID-19 vaccination.

The feature documentary TheyDream, based on interviews with his family, premiered at the 2026 Sundance Film Festival in the NEXT category and received the NEXT Special Jury Award.

== Personal life ==
Caballero is openly bisexual. He resides in Los Angeles.

== Filmography ==
=== Film ===
Year	Title	Notes	Ref.
2010	A Dream Deferred		
2013	Seed Story	Short film	
2013	How You Doin', Boy? Voicemails from Gran'Pa	Short film	
2017	Victor and Isolina	Short film	
2022	Chilly and Milly	Short film	
2026	TheyDream		

=== Web series ===
Year	Title	Notes	Ref.
2015—2016	Gran’pa Knows Best	30 episodes	
2023	A Little Off the Top	2 episodes	

== Awards and nominations ==
Year	Award	Category	Nominated work	Result	Ref.
2022	Atlanta Film Festival	Best Documentary Short	Chilly and Milly	Won	
2026	Sundance Film Festival	NEXT Special Jury Award	TheyDream	Won	
2026	Sundance Film Festival	NEXT Innovator Award	TheyDream	Nominated	
