= Barbara Forever =

2026 documentary film by Brydie O'Connor

- Film poster
- Directed by: Brydie O'Connor
- Produced by: Elijah Stevens; Brydie O'Connor; Claire Edelman
- Starring: Barbara Hammer (archive footage)
- Edited by: Matt Hixon
- Music by: Taul Katz
- Production companies: Space Time Films; Killer Films; Madhouse Films
- Distributed by: Strand Releasing
- Release date: January 24, 2026 (Sundance)
- Running time: 101 minutes
- Country: United States
- Language: English

Barbara Forever is a 2026 American documentary film directed by Brydie O'Connor in her feature directorial debut and executive produced by Christine Vachon. It is an archive-driven exploration of the life and work of the pioneering lesbian experimental filmmaker Barbara Hammer.

The film premiered in the U.S. Documentary Competition at the 2026 Sundance Film Festival, where it won the Jonathan Oppenheim Editing Award.

== Premise ==
The documentary utilizes a "kinetic tapestry" of archival footage, guided by Barbara Hammer's own voice, to explore her life, body, lovers, and lesbian identity. It chronicles her persistence and ambition in recording her own history to ensure she was not left out of the historical record, framing her work as a blueprint for future queer artists.

== Production ==
The film is directed by Brydie O'Connor, who previously directed the short documentary Love, Barbara (2022), which focused on Hammer's legacy and won the Grand Jury Prize for Short Documentary at Outfest. Barbara Forever serves as a feature-length expansion of O'Connor's archival research into Hammer's life.

The project is produced by Elijah Stevens, O'Connor, and Claire Edelman, with Christine Vachon of Killer Films serving as executive producer. Consulting producers include Zackary Drucker and Jenni Olson.

== Release ==
Barbara Forever premiered in the U.S. Documentary Competition section at the 2026 Sundance Film Festival, where it won the Jonathan Oppenheim Editing Award. It has been highlighted by LGBTQ+ publications as a "must-see" title for the 2026 festival season. The film had its international premiere on February 15, 2026 at the 76th Berlin International Film Festival in the section "Forum Special". In May 2026, Strand Releasing acquired distribution rights to the film and set it for a September 4, 2026, release.

== Reception ==
=== Critical response ===
On the review aggregator website Rotten Tomatoes, 100% of 36 critics' reviews are positive, with an average rating of 8.3/10. Metacritic, which uses a weighted average, assigned the film a score of 91 out of 100, based on eight critics, indicating "universal acclaim".

Sam Bodrojan of IndieWire gave the film a B+ and wrote that it "is a sincere ode to the queer iconoclast."

=== Accolades ===
Ceremony	Award	Date of ceremony	Category	Recipient(s)	Result	Ref.
2026 Sundance Film Festival	Jonathan Oppenheim Editing Award	January 30, 2026	U.S. Documentary	Matt Hixon	Won	
76th Berlin International Film Festival	Teddy Award	February 20, 2026	Best Documentary Film	Brydie O'Connor	Won	
