= Alexander Abdallah =

Swedish actor and filmmaker (born 1993)

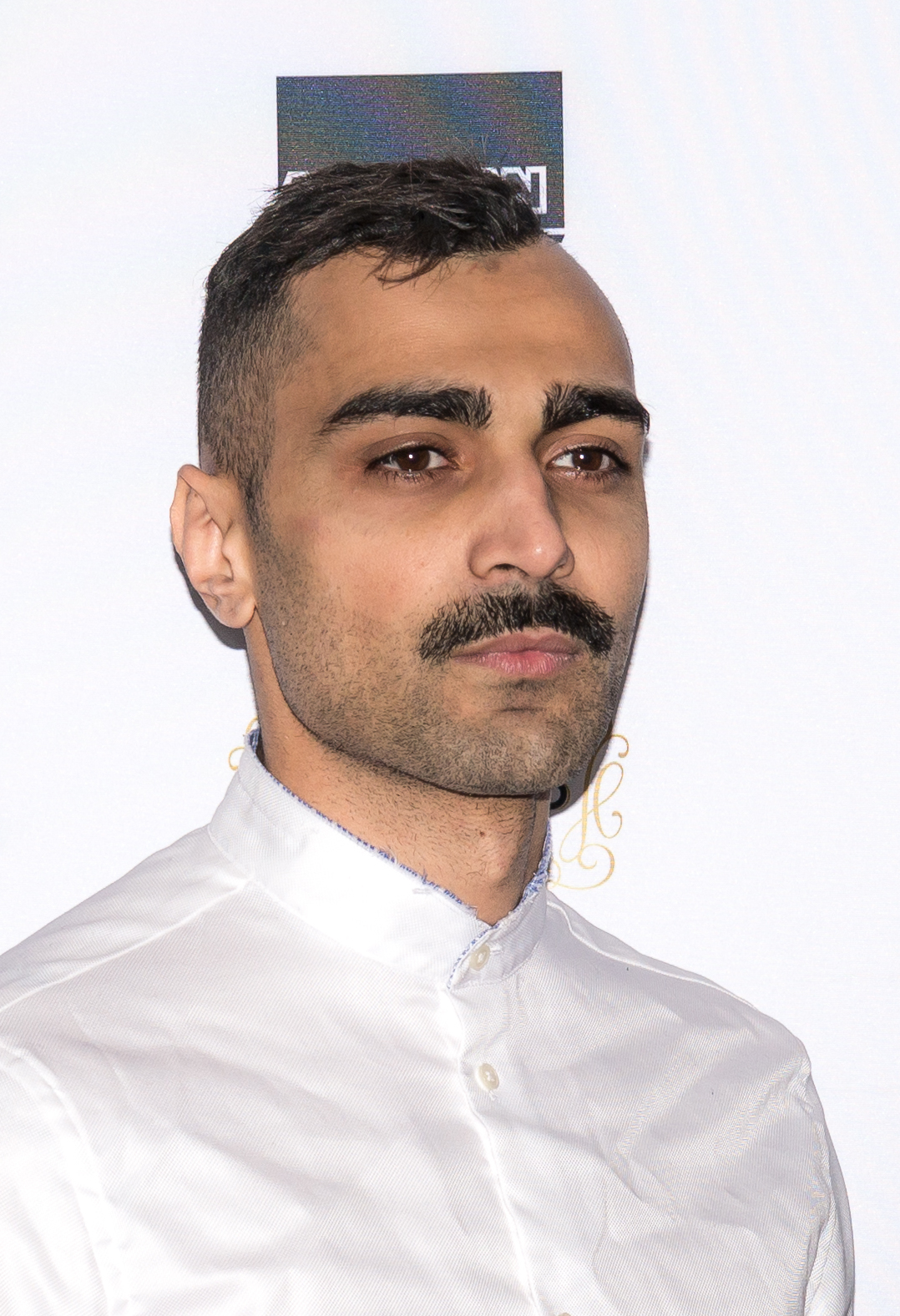
- Abdallah in 2018
- Born: Jihad Abdallah; 30 April 1993 (age 33); Uppsala, Sweden
- Education: Malmö Theater Academy
- Occupations: Actor; director; screenwriter
- Years active: 2017–present
- Known for: Snabba Cash
- Awards: Kristallen for Best Actor (2021)

Alexander Abdallah (born Jihad Abdallah; 30 April 1993) is a Swedish actor and filmmaker. His breakout role was in Snabba Cash (2021–2022), for which he won a Kristallen for Best Actor and the Såstaholm Film & Performing Arts Award. In addition to lead roles in Thunder in My Heart (2021–2023) and Paradis City (2025), he has also worked as a director and screenwriter.

== Early life and education ==
Jihad Abdallah was born on 30 April 1993 at Uppsala University Hospital. He was the third of four siblings born to Lebanese parents who had immigrated to Sweden during the 1980s. He lived initially in Östhammar. When he was four years old, his family's home was broken into by racist skinheads, who assaulted his father. After the attack, his family moved to Gränby, also near Uppsala. He attended Wik Folk High School and Fridhem Folk High School. Abdallah changed his first name to Alexander when he turned 18. He graduated from the Malmö Theater Academy in 2018.

== Career ==
In 2017, he had supporting roles in two stage productions at Helsingborg City Theater. First, he played Tyball in Romeo and Juliet and then the king's son in Marina Steinmo's adaptation of Rapunzel. He also appeared in Snubben lättar på sitt hjärta at the Kulturhuset Stadsteatern in Skärholmen and Oscar Liljas försvinnande at the Malmö City Theater, in 2018 and 2019, respectively.

Abdallah made his directorial debut with the short film Jag skiner inte utan er mina bröder, which focused on the aftermath of a shooting in Malmö from a child's perspective. It premiered at the Gothenburg Film Festival in 2019.

In 2020, he starred in Bye bye bror with Robin Stegmar, in a joint production by Riksteatern and Teater Fryshuset. Although the play's writing was criticized by Jacob Lündstrom in Dagens Nyheter, both Abdallah and Stegmar's performances were praised. In June of the same year, it was announced that he would be a cast member of the upcoming Netflix series Snabba Cash, an adaptation of Jens Lapidus' novel of the same name. The series premiered in April 2021. In a review for Aftonbladet, Karolina Fjellborg called Abdallah's performance as Salim "dangerously good." For Snabba Cash, Abdallah was awarded Best Male Actor at Kristallen. He also won the Såstaholm Film & Performing Arts Award.

He was featured in Spotify's 2022 audio drama, De Fria. He played Sam in Thunder in My Heart (2021–2023), for which he was nominated for another Kristallen for Best Male Actor. He also played Emir in Paradis City.

He co-created the comedy-drama TV series Halva halva with Mustafa al-Mashhadani. Abdallah also served as a director and writer. The series, known as Home In You for its English-language release, received a positive review from Tim Forster in Special Broadcasting Service.

Abdallah was cast to play King Gustav III in The Von Fersens. In 2026, Abdallah joined TV4 Rising Star Award jury at the 2026 Stockholm International Film Festival held in November.

== Acting credits ==
=== Film ===
Year	Title	Role	Notes	Ref.
2026	Doctor Glas	Klas Recke		
TBA	The Von Fersens†	Gustav III		

=== Television ===
Year	Title	Role	Notes	Ref.
2020	Love Me	Rick		
2021–2022	Snabba Cash	Salim		
2021–2023	Thunder in My Heart	Sam		
2022	De Fria	Rami (voice)	Audio drama	
2025	Paradis City	Emir		
2026	Blood Sacrifice	John-Jo Persson		

=== Theater ===
Year	Title	Role	Theater	Notes	Ref.
2017	Romeo and Juliet	Tyball	Helsingborg City Theater		
2017	Rapunzel	King's son	Helsingborg City Theater		
2018	Snubben lättar på sitt hjärta		Kulturhuset Stadsteatern Skärholmen		
2019	Oscar Liljas försvinnande	Rémy	Malmö City Theater		
2020	Bye bye bror	Ava	Riksteatern–Teater Fryshuset		

== Awards and nominations ==
Year	Award	Category	Work	Result	Ref.
2021	Kristallen	Best Male Actor	Snabba Cash	Won	
2021	Såstaholm Film & Performing Arts Award			Won	
2023	Kristallen	Best Male Actor	Thunder in My Heart	Nominated	
