= Lady (2026 film) =

- Film poster
- Directed by: Olive Nwosu
- Written by: Olive Nwosu
- Produced by: Alex Polunin; John Giwa-Amu; Stella Nwimo
- Starring: Jessica Gabriel's Ujah; Amanda Oruh; Tinuade Jemiseye
- Cinematography: Alana Mejia Gonzalez
- Production companies: Osian International; Good Gate
- Distributed by: HanWay Films (Worldwide)
- Release date: 22 January 2026 (Sundance)
- Countries: United Kingdom; Nigeria

Lady is a 2026 drama film written and directed by Olive Nwosu in her feature debut. The film premiered in the World Cinema Dramatic Competition at the 2026 Sundance Film Festival, where it won the Special Jury Award for Acting Ensemble.

== Premise ==
Set in Lagos, Nigeria, Lady follows one of the city's few female cab drivers, known as Lady, who survives by staying focused and tough while saving money to attempt moving. Her world changes when Pinky, her long-lost childhood friend and now a sex worker, returns unexpectedly. Drawn reluctantly into Pinky's orbit, Lady becomes the driver for a group of glamorous, reckless, fun-loving women navigating Lagos nightlife. What begins as judgment slowly evolves into a bond of unexpected sisterhood.

== Cast ==
- Jessica Gabriel's Ujah as Lady
- Amanda Oruh
- Tinuade Jemiseye
- Bucci Franklin
- Seun Kuti

== Development ==
In 2023, Lady received the Sundance Institute / NHK Award, an international honor supporting emerging filmmakers developing their first or second feature films. The film was developed with Film4 and received financing from the BFI National Lottery Filmmaking Fund, Film4, and Screen Scotland, with additional support from Level Forward and Amplify Capital.

== Production ==
Lady is a U.K.–Nigerian co-production between Ossian International (Alex Polunin's production company in Glasgow), Good Gate (John Giwa-Amu) and Stella Nwimo. To prepare for the film, director Nwosu conducted research in Lagos, spending time with Nigerian sex workers to ground the story in lived experience. The director describes the film as her "love letter to the women of Lagos," aiming to honor lives often overlooked in cinema and create a Lagos heroine "flawed, luminous, and unafraid."

== Release ==
Lady had its world premiere at the 2026 Sundance Film Festival, screening in the World Cinema Dramatic Competition. It was one of the BFI-backed titles selected for the festival. The film had its European premiere at the 76th Berlin International Film Festival on February 18, 2026, in the "Panorama" section.

It is represented for worldwide sales by HanWay Films.

== Awards ==
Lady won the Special Jury Award for Acting Ensemble at the 2026 Sundance Film Festival.
