= Dateline Scotland =

2014 Scottish satire TV series

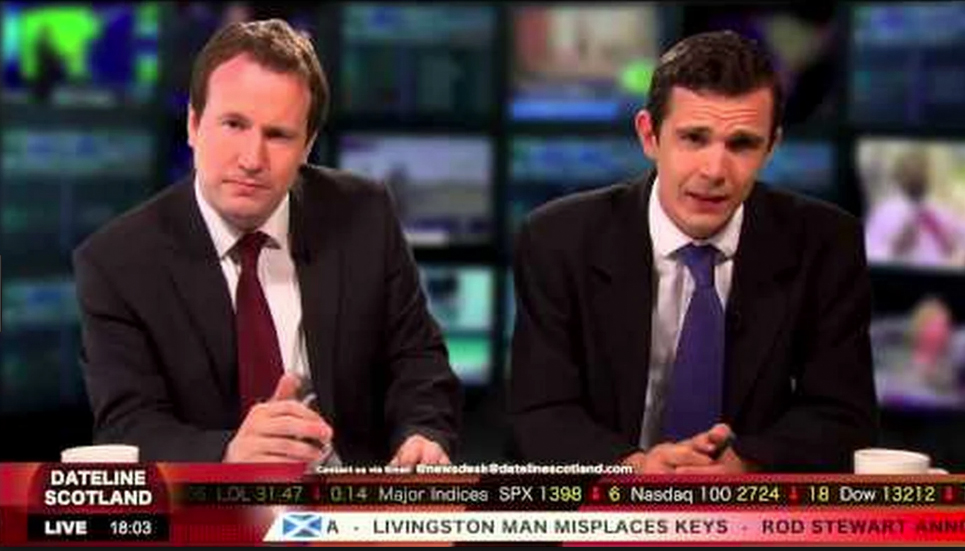
- Created by: Jack Foster, James Devoy, Jonathan Cairney
- Starring: Jack Foster; James Devoy; Jonathan Cairney; Briony Cruden
- Country of origin: Scotland
- No. of episodes: 10

Production
- Running time: 5 minutes

Original release
- Network: Online
- Release: 30 July – 18 September 2014

Dateline Scotland is a Scottish satire of television current affairs programmes, broadcast in 2014, created by Jack Foster, James Devoy and Jonathan Cairney. Dateline Scotland is composed of eight 5-6 minute episodes and a 15-minute special, released to coincide with the Scottish independence referendum polling day. The eight 5 minute episodes were originally broadcast online, from 30 July to 17 September 2014 online. A one-off special of the programme was also released in May 2015, to coincide with the UK general election.

In July 2018, the show's creators released 13 new episodes under a revived format titled Dateline 2018. The series focused less on Scottish politics than its predecessor, and also saw the departure of Briony Cruden, who played the correspondent Briony Laing.

== Programme format ==
Each episode is presented as a parody news programme, anchored by Foster and Devoy, featuring three or four spoof stories based on the previous week's news. Dateline Scotland was produced in the final two months of the 2014 Scottish independence referendum, and the programme's content is reflective of this.

It has been suggested that the show's popularity was related to a dissatisfaction amongst independence supporters with the mainstream Scottish media, with regards its coverage of the referendum.

== Main characters ==
- Jack Foster (Jack Foster) – Anchor
- James Devoy (James Devoy) – Anchor
- Briony Laing (Briony Cruden) – Various correspondents
- George Deary (Jonathan Cairney) – Director of Strategy for the Better Together campaign (parody).

One-off correspondents who appeared in the Referendum Day Special, include Coletta Samson (Sandra O'Sullivan), Thomas Capes (Matthew Houlihan), Achiltibuie Correspondent (Dan Devoy). Political cartoonist Greg Moodie also guests as Leroy Jenkmans, "Chief Strategist for Yes Scotland".

== Cast and crew ==
- Jack Foster – Anchor
- James Devoy – Anchor
- Jonathan Cairney – George Deary (also Seb Foucault and Piers Morgen)
- Briony Laing – Various Correspondent roles
- Devisers – Jack Foster and James Devoy
- Writers - Jack Foster, James Devoy, Jonathan Cairney, the cast
- Directors - Jack Foster and James Devoy
- Producers - Jack Foster and James Devoy
