= Marga en el DF =

2026 Mexican-American short film

- Directed by: Gabriela Ortega
- Written by: Gabriela Ortega
- Produced by: Carlos López Estrada; Karla Luna Cantú; Eugenio Valero; Natalia González; Valerie Bush
- Starring: Camila Santana; David Palacio; Xabiani Ponce de León; Andrea de Fátima
- Cinematography: Maria Secco
- Edited by: Monica Salazar
- Music by: Camila De Laborde; Carlos Vertíz; Hector Ruíz; Isaac Soto
- Release date: 2026
- Running time: 21 minutes
- Countries: Mexico; United States; Dominican Republic
- Language: Spanish

Marga en el DF is a 2026 Mexican-American short drama film written and directed by Gabriela Ortega. Set in 1995, the film follows a pregnant Dominican woman who travels to Mexico City to surprise her husband, only to discover his infidelity. The film premiered at the 2026 Sundance Film Festival and is eligible for consideration for the Oscars.

== Plot ==
Set in 1995, the film follows Marga Salinas, a 21-week-pregnant Dominican woman who travels to Mexico City to surprise her husband. After discovering his infidelity, she confronts the betrayal while navigating grief and seeking independence.

== Cast ==
- Camila Santana
- David Palacio
- Xabiani Ponce de León
- Andrea de Fátima

== Production ==
Written and directed by Gabriela Ortega, Marga en el DF is a co-production between Mexico, the Dominican Republic and the United States. The film was produced byCarlos López Estrada, Ortega, Karla Luna Cantú, Eugenio Valero, Natalia González, Stacy Perskie and Valerie Bush. Holly Stanton and Elle Keseley served as the executive producers. The cast includes Camila Santana, David Palacio, Xabiani Ponce de León and Andrea de Fátima.

Ortega drew inspiration from her family's experiences with long-distance marriage, as well as her own visits to Mexico City. Her father's studies in the city and family stories about maintaining a marriage across distances helped shape the film's emotional premise. She also sought to explore Caribbean identity and cultural memory through the story. The film incorporates songs by Selena Quintanilla, including Como La Flor and Dreaming of You.

== Release ==
Marga en el DF was selected as part of the short film programme at the 2026 Sundance Film Festival. It marked Ortega's second appearance at the festival, following the screening of her short film Huella in 2022. The film subsequently screened at South by Southwest (SXSW), AFI FEST and more.

In June 2026, Marga en el DF won the Best Live-Action Short Over 15 Minutes award at the 32nd Palm Springs International ShortFest. The award qualified the film for submission to the Academy Awards in the short film category, making it eligible for consideration.
