= The Brittney Griner Story =

Biographical documentary film about Brittney Griner

- Directed by: Alexandria Stapleton
- Produced by: Alexandria Stapleton; Stacy Scripter; Funmi Akinyode; Megan Goedewaagen; Carolyn Hepburn
- Production company: ESPN Films
- Release date: January 27, 2026 (Sundance Film Festival)
- Running time: 107 minutes
- Country: United States
- Language: English

The Brittney Griner Story is a documentary film about American basketball player Brittney Griner, directed by Alexandria Stapleton. The film had its world premiere at the 2026 Sundance Film Festival.

== Premise ==
The film explores the circumstances that led Brittney Griner to play basketball outside the United States, including her detainment and her advocacy for the release of other wrongful detainees.

== Cast ==
- Brittney Griner as herself

== Release ==
The film had its world premiere at the 2026 Sundance Film Festival.

== Production ==
In December 2023, ESPN and Disney Entertainment Television announced an ESPN Films documentary feature developed with Brittney Griner.
