= Jonathan Oppenheim Editing Award =

This is a list of winners of the Jonathan Oppenheim Editing Award for documentaries at the Sundance Film Festival.

== History ==
Since 2021, this prize has been annually awarded by the U.S. Documentary jury to commemorate Jonathan Oppenheim, an editor best known for his work on Paris is Burning, an LGBQT+ film chronicling the ball culture of New York City and Black, Latino, gay, and transgender communities. He served as a longtime advisor and mentor at the Sundance Documentary Edit and Story Lab.

== Winners ==
Year	Documentary	Editor(s)
2021	Homeroom	Rebecca Adorno and Kristina Motwani
2022	Fire of Love	Erin Casper and Jocelyne Chaput
2023	Going Varsity in Mariachi	Daniela I. Quiroz
2024	FRIDA	Carla Gutiérrez
2025	André Is an Idiot	Parker Laramie
2026	Barbara Forever	Matt Hixon
