= Jaripeo (film) =

2026 documentary film

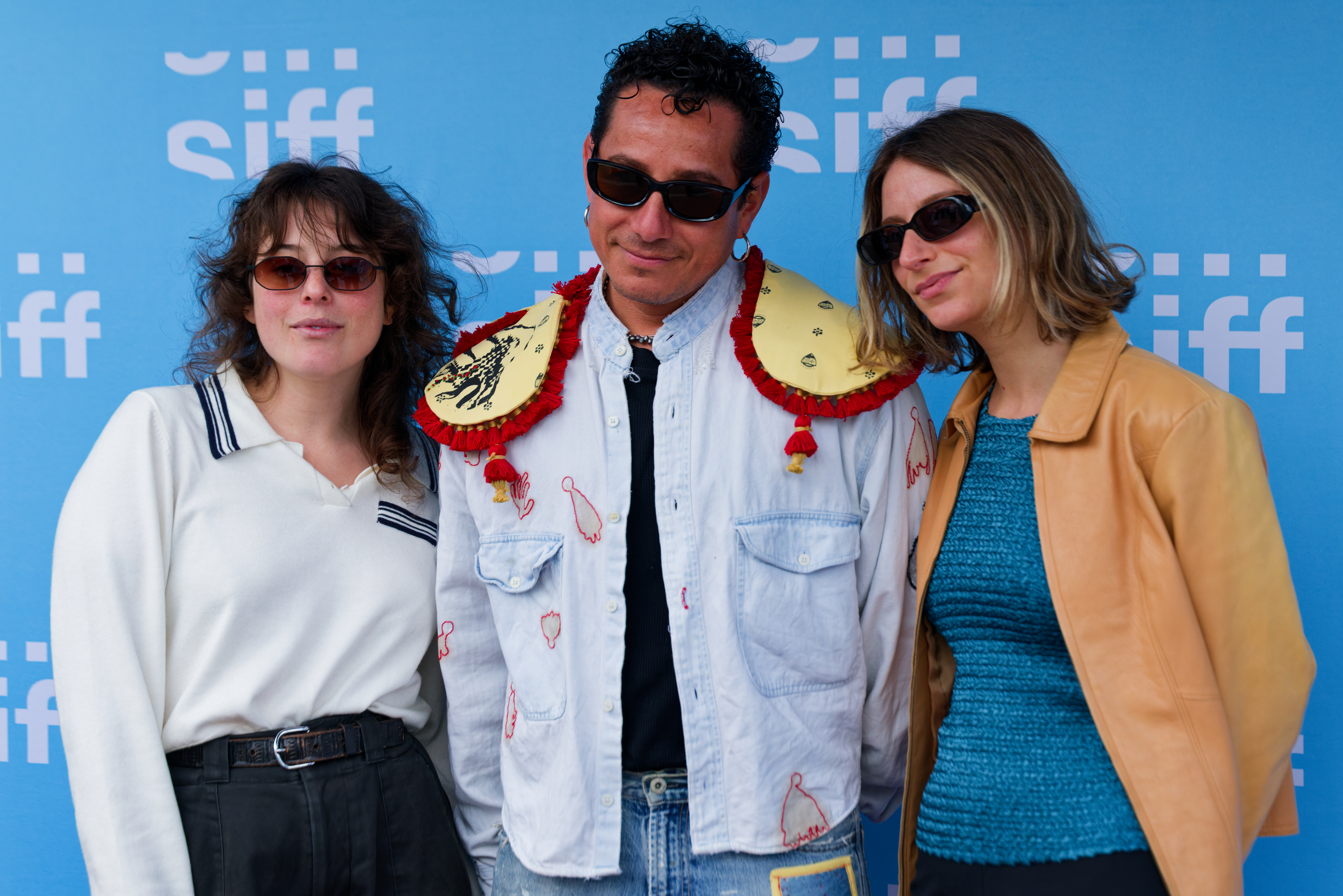
- Directors Rebecca Zweig and Efraín Mojica, and producer Sarah Strunin at SIFF 2026
- Directed by: Efraín Mojica; Rebecca Zweig
- Produced by: Sarah Strunin
- Cinematography: Josué Eber Morales; Gerardo Guerra
- Edited by: Analía Goethals
- Music by: Emilia Ezeta; Marton Radics
- Production companies: ITVS; Misfits Entertainment
- Release date: January 25, 2026 (Sundance)
- Running time: 70 minutes
- Countries: United States; France; Mexico
- Languages: English; Spanish

Jaripeo is a 2026 documentary film directed by Efraín Mojica and Rebecca Zweig. It follows a queer perspective on the jaripeo, a Mexican style of rodeo and displays of machismo.

The film had its world premiere at the 2026 Sundance Film Festival on January 25, and its international premiere at the Panorama section of the 76th Berlin International Film Festival on February 18.

== Premise ==
Explores Michoacán's hypermasculine rodeos, jaripeo, which descends into memory, longing, and queer desire.

== Production ==
The film received support from the Sundance Institute Documentary Fund, SFFILM Documentary Fund, Chicken & Egg Pictures, Points North Institute, ITVS and Arte.

== Release ==
It had its world premiere at the 2026 Sundance Film Festival on January 25, 2026, in the NEXT section. It also screened the 76th Berlin International Film Festival on February 18 in the Panorama section.
