= How to Divorce During the War =

2026 film by Andrius Blaževičius

- Lithuanian theatrical release poster
- Lithuanian: Skyrybos karo metu
- Directed by: Andrius Blaževičius
- Written by: Andrius Blaževičius
- Produced by: Marija Razgutė
- Starring: Marius Repšys; Žygimantė Elena Jakštaitė
- Cinematography: Narvydas Naujalis
- Edited by: Anna Ryndova
- Music by: Jakub Rataj
- Production company: M-Films
- Release date: 26 January 2026 (Sundance)
- Running time: 108 minutes
- Countries: Lithuania; Luxembourg; Ireland; Czech Republic
- Languages: Lithuanian; English; Russian; Ukrainian
- Box office: $123,799

How to Divorce During the War (Lithuanian: Skyrybos karo metu) is a 2026 drama film written and directed by Andrius Blaževičius. A co-production of Lithuania, Luxembourg, Ireland, and Czech Republic, it stars Marius Repšys and Žygimantė Elena Jakštaitė as a couple going through a divorce right before the 2022 Russian invasion of Ukraine.

The film had its world premiere at the World Cinema Dramatic Competition section of the 2026 Sundance Film Festival on 26 January, where it won the Directing Award Dramatic. It was also selected as Lithuania's entry for the 99th Academy Awards for Best International Feature Film.

== Premise ==
Set against the backdrop of Vilnius in 2022, Marija and Vytas navigate their divorce as it intersects with the ongoing Russian invasion of Ukraine.

== Cast ==
- Marius Repšys as Vytas
- Žygimantė Elena Jakštaitė as Marija
- Amelija Adomaitytė
- Indrė Patkauskaitė
- Gintarė Parulytė

== Production ==
In August 2023, How to Divorce during the War was first presented at the Nordic Co-Production Market. In February 2024, the project was also showcased at the Berlinale Co-Production Market. It also had secured development funds from the Lithuanian Film Centre and received support from LRT. In December 2024, it received €700,000 production grant from the Film Fund Luxembourg, with the production company Red Lion attached to co-produce.

Principal photography took place in Vilnius in March 2025.

== Release ==
How to Divorce During the War had its world premiere on 26 January 2026 at the 2026 Sundance Film Festival, competing at the World Cinema Dramatic Competition, and won the Directing Award Dramatic. Prior to its premiere, New Europe Film Sales acquired the film's international sales rights.

== Reception ==
On review aggregator Rotten Tomatoes, the film holds an approval rating of 100% based on 30 reviews, with an average rating of 7.4/10. On Metacritic, the film has a weighted average score of 74 out of 100, based on 7 critics, indicating "generally favorable reviews".

== See also ==
- Cinema of Lithuania
- List of submissions to the 99th Academy Awards for Best International Feature Film
- List of Lithuanian submissions for the Academy Award for Best International Feature Film
