= Older Than Ireland =

- Poster
- Directed by: Alex Fegan
- Written by: Alex Fegan
- Produced by: Garry Walsh
- Cinematography: Colm Nicell
- Edited by: Alex Fegan
- Music by: Denis Clohessy
- Release date: September 25, 2015
- Running time: 80 minutes
- Country: Ireland
- Language: English

Older Than Ireland is a 2015 Irish documentary film written and directed by Alex Fegan. It features the perspective of thirty Irish centenarians.

== Release ==
The film was released in Ireland on September 25, 2015. The film was also released in U.S. theaters on April 29, 2016.

== Reception ==
The film has a 100% rating on Rotten Tomatoes based on 26 reviews. Donald Clarke of The Irish Times awarded the film four stars out of five. Mike McCahill of The Guardian also awarded the film four stars out of five. Moira Macdonald of The Seattle Times awarded the film three stars out of four.

The Hollywood Reporter gave the film a positive review: "Though never managing to surprise us much, this brisk encounter with the living past has moments of charm and the occasional fresh perspective."
