= Will Youmans =

American writer, activist, professor, and rapper

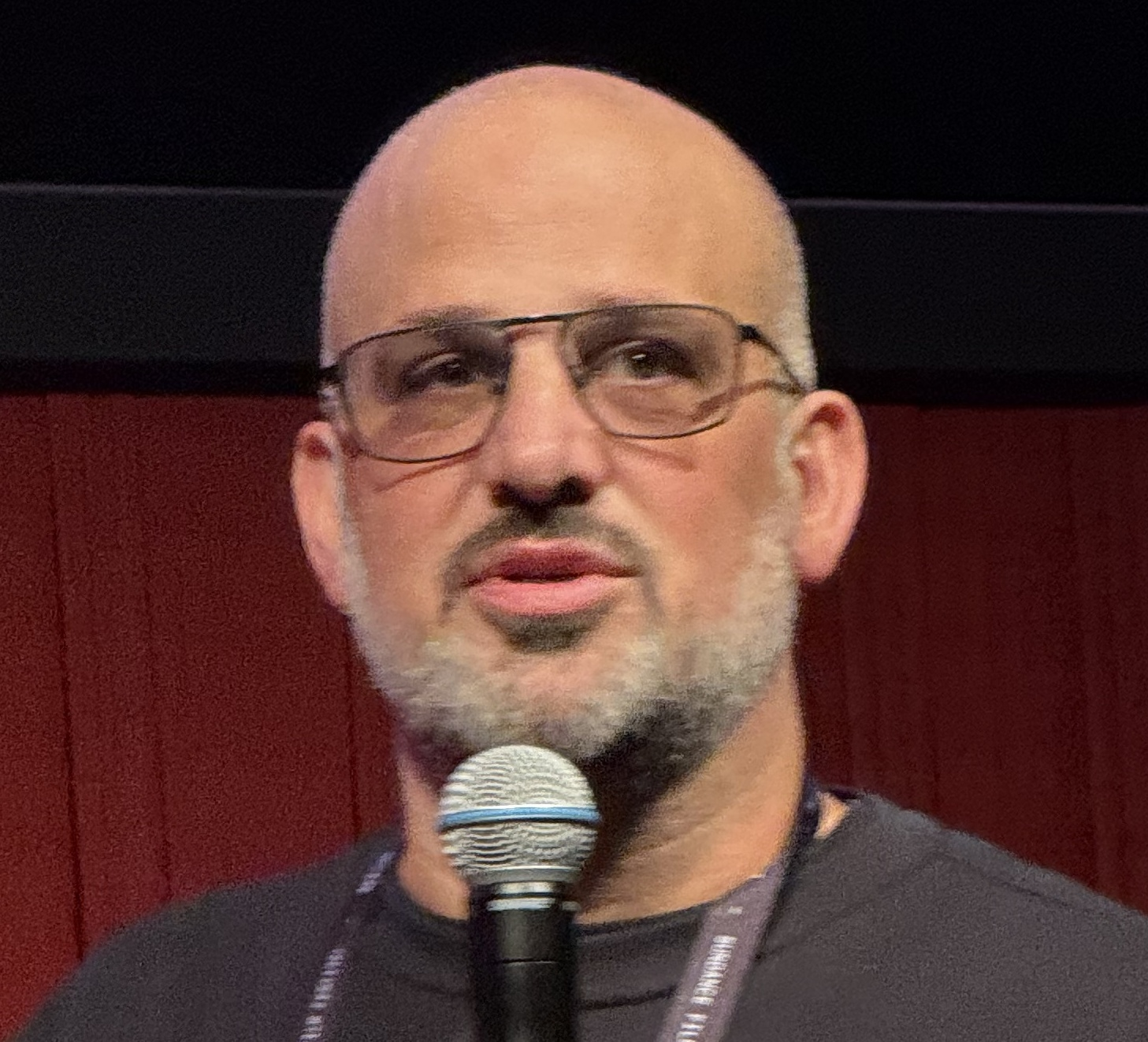
- Youmans at Sundance 2026

Background information
- Born: February 9, 1978 (age 48)
- Origin: Detroit, Michigan
- Occupations: Writer and activist

William Lafi Youmans (born February 9, 1978) is an American professor, activist, and former rapper.

== Education ==
Youmans graduated from the University of Michigan with a bachelor's degree in political science in 2000. In 2003, he graduated from the University of California, Berkeley School of Law with a Juris Doctor degree. Youmans has a PhD in communication studies at his undergraduate alma mater, Michigan.

== Family background ==
His mother is from Nazareth. His grandparents are Arab citizens of Israel, but he prefers to describe them as Palestinians. Youmans was troubled by the disadvantage and disrespect towards them that he witnessed when visiting them at the age of 17.

== Hip hop music ==
Youmans performed as hip hop artist 'Iron Sheik' from 2000 - 2006, and released Camel Clutch 2003 and Yet We Remain. Part of the Palestinian hip hop movement, much of his music related to the historical plight of Palestinians. Iron Sheik was featured in the BBC, CNN, The New York Times, and the French edition of Rolling Stone. He performed regularly throughout the United States, and appeared in Egypt, Lebanon, and the United Kingdom. He was profiled in an exhibit at the Arab American National Museum in Dearborn, Michigan.

== Activism and academic career ==
He co-hosted and co-produced What's Happening? on the American channel of the international satellite TV station, Arab Radio and Television Network (ART). He has written in various media outlets, including the San Francisco Chronicle, The Michigan Daily, The Daily Californian, and CounterPunch. He wrote a weekly column with The Arab American News.

In 2017 Oxford University Press published his book on Al Jazeera's efforts to attract an American audience, "Unlikely Audience: Al Jazeera's Struggle in America".

As of 2024 he is an Associate Professor of Media and Public Affairs at George Washington University and the Director of the Institute for Public Diplomacy and Global Communication there.

== Notable works ==
Film

- America at a Crossroads: Campus Battleground (2007), Public Broadcasting Service

Book

- An Unlikely Audience: Al Jazeera's Struggle in America (2017), Oxford University Press. ISBN 978-0190655723
