= The Friend's House Is Here =

2026 Iranian film drama

The Friend's House is Here
- Directed by: Hossein Keshavarz; Maryam Ataei
- Written by: Hossein Keshavarz; Maryam Ataei
- Produced by: Hossein Keshavarz; Maryam Ataei
- Starring: Mahshad Bahram; Hana Mana; Farzad Karen; Zohreh Pirnia
- Cinematography: Ali Ehsani
- Edited by: Hossein Keshavarz
- Music by: Arian Saleh
- Production company: Alma Linda Films
- Distributed by: Greenwich Entertainment (United States)
- Release dates: 24 January 2026 (Sundance); 4 December 2026 (United States)
- Running time: 96 minutes
- Countries: Iran; United States
- Language: Persian

The Friend's House Is Here is a 2026 drama film written, directed, and produced by Hossein Keshavarz and Maryam Ataei. It stars Mahshad Bahram, Hana Mana, Farzad Karen, and Zohreh Pirnia.

The film explores the underground art scene in Tehran. It was selected for the U.S. Dramatic Competition at the 2026 Sundance Film Festival on January 24, 2026.

== Premise ==
Set in the underground art world of Tehran, two young women establish a hidden sanctuary of freedom and sisterhood to practice their craft. When their creative circle is exposed, they are forced to fight for each other's safety and the survival of their community.

== Cast ==
- Mahshad Bahram
- Hana Mana
- Farzad Karen
- Zohreh Pirnia

== Production ==
The film is co-directed by Hossein Keshavarz and Maryam Ataei, a married couple from Iran, marking their joint feature directorial debut at the Sundance Film Festival. Keshavarz previously directed the Independent Spirit Award-nominated film Dog Sweat (2010) and produced the Sundance Audience Award winner Circumstance (2011), on which Ataei also served as an associate producer.

The project was produced through their company, Alma Linda Films. The film's narrative focuses on the intersection of artistic expression and political resistance in contemporary Iran.

== Release ==
The Friend's House is Here was announced as part of the U.S. Dramatic Competition at the 2026 Sundance Film Festival on December 10, 2025. It premiered at the festival on January 24, 2026, where it won the Special Jury Award for Ensemble Cast. In April 2026, Greenwich Entertainment acquired U.S. distribution rights to the film, planning to theatrically release it that fall.

== Reception ==
=== Critical response ===
On the review aggregator website Rotten Tomatoes, 100% of 21 critics' reviews are positive, with an average rating of 8.2/10.
