= One in a Million (2026 film) =

2026 documentary film

- Theatrical release poster
- Directed by: Itab Azzam; Jack MacInnes
- Produced by: Will Anderson; James Bluemel; Andrew Palmer; Raney Aronson-Rath
- Edited by: Alec Rossiter; Iain Pettifer
- Music by: Simon Russell
- Production companies: KEO Films; BBC Storyville; Frontline Features; Impact Partners
- Distributed by: PBS Distribution (United States); Dogwoof (United Kingdom)
- Release dates: January 23, 2026 (Sundance); October 21, 2026 (United States); November 6, 2026 (United Kingdom)
- Running time: 106 minutes
- Countries: United Kingdom; United States
- Languages: Arabic; German; English, with English subtitles

One in a Million is a 2026 documentary film directed by Itab Azzam and Jack MacInnes. It follows a girl from Aleppo over the course of ten years as she travels from Syria and Turkey to Germany, navigating war, displacement and exile.

The film had its world premiere at the 2026 Sundance Film Festival on January 23, 2026, in the World Cinema Documentary Competition, where it won the Audience Award. It was released in the United States on October 21, 2026, by PBS Distribution, and in the United Kingdom on November 6, 2026, by Dogwoof.

== Premise ==
One in a Million follows Israa, a 11-year-old girl from Aleppo at the start of the documentary, and her family over the following ten years of her life. The film begins with the flight of the family from Syria via Turkey and the Balkan route to Germany. It shows their experience of war, displacement and the personal development of the protagonist and her family. It ends with Israa's journey to destroyed Aleppo after the end of the Syrian civil war.

== Production ==
The film is a co-production between award-winning filmmakers Itab Azzam, originally from Syria, and her husband, British filmmaker Jack MacInnes, Keo Films, Frontline Features and BBC Storyville. PBS Distribution is in charge of distribution in the United States, and Dogwoof in the United Kingdom. International distribution is handled by Autolook Filmsales in Vienna.

== Release ==
The film had its world premiere at the 2026 Sundance Film Festival on January 23, 2026. It was released in the United States on October 21, 2026, and in the United Kingdom on November 6, 2026.

== Awards ==
- Sundance Film Festival 2026, Audience Award
- Dallas International Film Festival 2026, Best Documentary
- Sheffield DocFest 2026, Shine Global Resilience Award
- Twin Cities Film Festival 2026, Best Documentary
- United Nations Association Film Festival, UNAFF Youth Vision Award
- Syrian Doc Days 2026, Best Film
- Zurich Film Festival 2026, Special Mention Documentary
- Asia Pacific Screen Awards, Best Documentary
- British Independent Film Awards, Nominee Best Feature Documentary
- British Independent Film Awards, Nominee Breakthrough Producer

== Reception ==
On Rotten Tomatoes, One in a Million received a 100% rating, based on 25 reviews of international film critics. It achieved positive media coverage in The New York Times, Variety, The Hollywood Reporter, The Guardian and the Hindustan Times, among others. A report about the making of the film in The Guardian called it "a portrait of the refugee crisis", and "also a coming-of-age story, [...] about growing pains that feels universal in places."
