= Bedford Park (film) =

2026 drama film by Stephanie Ahn

- Theatrical release poster
- Directed by: Stephanie Ahn
- Written by: Stephanie Ahn
- Produced by: Gary Foster; Chris S. Lee; Nina Yang Bongiovi; Theresa Kang; Son Suk-ku; Russ Krasnoff
- Starring: Moon Choi; Son Suk-ku; Won Mi-kyung; Kim Eung-soo; Jefferson White
- Cinematography: David McFarland
- Edited by: Malcolm Jamieson; Stephanie Ahn
- Music by: Michael Brook
- Production companies: Banchan LLC; Krasnoff/Foster Entertainment; B&C Group
- Distributed by: Sony Pictures Classics
- Release dates: January 24, 2026 (Sundance); December 11, 2026 (United States)
- Running time: 119 minutes
- Country: United States
- Language: English

Bedford Park is a 2026 American drama film written and directed by Stephanie Ahn in her feature directorial debut. The film stars Moon Choi, Son Suk-ku, Won Mi-kyung, Kim Eung-soo, and Jefferson White.

The film premiered in the U.S. Dramatic Competition at the 2026 Sundance Film Festival on January 24, 2026, where it won the Special Jury Award for Debut Feature and was nominated for Grand Jury Prize for Dramatic. It is scheduled to be theatrically released in the United States on March 5, 2027, by Sony Pictures Classics.

== Synopsis ==
Audrey (Moon Choi), a Korean American woman in her 30s, returns to her parents' home following her mother's car accident. There, she encounters Eli (Son Suk-ku), the man responsible for the crash. Despite their differing backgrounds, the two bond over their shared histories of childhood trauma and the cultural weight of "han" (deep-seated resentment and sorrow), forming an unlikely romantic connection.

== Cast ==
- Moon Choi as Audrey, a disillusioned physiotherapist recently suspended from her job
- Son Suk-ku as Eli, a former wrestler turned security guard and Audrey's love-interest
- Won Mi-kyung as Hey, Audrey's mother
- Kim Eung-soo as Audrey's father
- Jefferson White as Jay, Eli's stepbrother
- Aaron Yoo as Henry, Audrey's brother

== Production ==
The film marks the feature directorial debut of Stephanie Ahn, who also wrote the screenplay. It is produced by Gary Foster and Russ Krasnoff of Krasnoff/Foster Entertainment, alongside Chris S. Lee of B&C Group, Nina Yang Bongiovi, Theresa Kang, and star Son Suk-ku.

Principal photography took place in Englewood, New Jersey, wrapping in mid-2025. Additional post-production details were confirmed in a trade announcement regarding producer Chris S. Lee's slate.

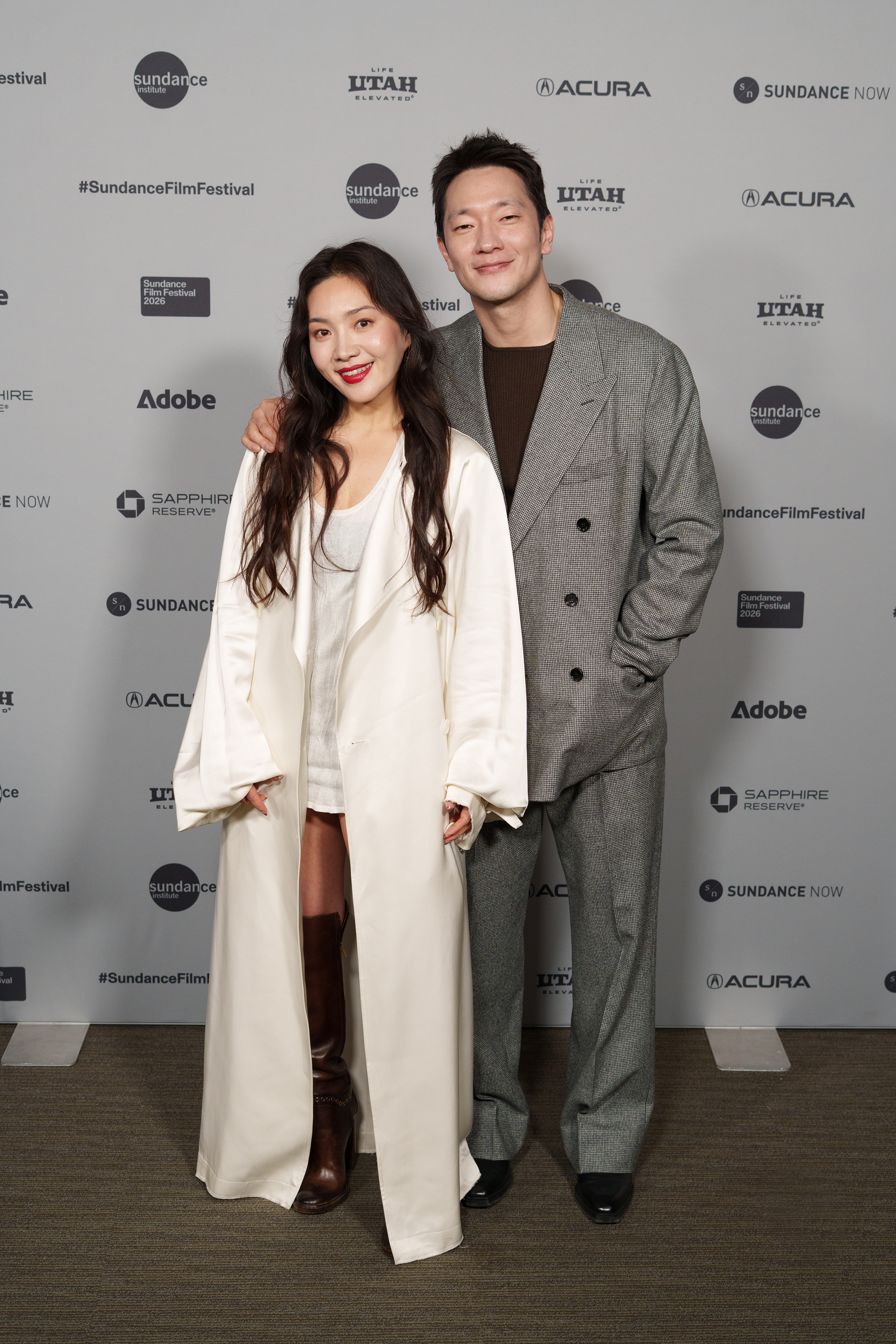
Moon Choi and Son Suk-ku at the Bedford Park Premier at Sundance Film Festival

== Release ==
Bedford Park was selected for the U.S. Dramatic Competition at the 2026 Sundance Film Festival and had its world premiere on January 24, 2026, where it won the Special Jury Award for Debut Feature. On January 30, Sony Pictures Classics acquired worldwide distribution rights to the film. Although a release date of September 22, 2026 was announced at Sony Classics' presentation at the 2026 CinemaCon, the film's release was later postponed indefinitely. The film is scheduled to be released for an awards-qualifying run on December 11, 2026, followed by a nationwide release in the United States on March 5, 2027.

The film also screened in the Discovery program at the 2026 Toronto International Film Festival.

=== Accolades ===
Award	Date of ceremony	Category	Recipient(s)	Result	Ref.
Sundance Film Festival	2026	U.S. Dramatic Special Jury Award for Debut Feature	Bedford Park	Won	

== Reception ==
On the review aggregator website Rotten Tomatoes, 96% of 26 critics' reviews are positive, with an average rating of 7.1/10.

Sara Clements, writing for the Next Best Picture, praises the films portrait of the "raw" immigrant experience. Similarly from The Hollywood Reporter, Angie Han mentions that Ahn had a firm grasp on who her characters are directly making the acting "wholly believable."
