= To Hold a Mountain =

2026 Montenegrin documentary film

To Hold A Mountain
- International promotional poster
- Montenegrin: Planina
- Directed by: Biljana Tutorov; Petar Glomazić
- Written by: Biljana Tutorov; Petar Glomazić
- Produced by: Biljana Tutorov
- Cinematography: Eva Kraljević
- Edited by: George Cragg
- Music by: Draško Adžić
- Production company: Wake Up Films
- Release date: 26 January 2026 (Sundance)
- Running time: 105 minutes
- Countries: Montenegro; Serbia; France; Slovenia; Croatia
- Language: Montenegrin

To Hold a Mountain (Montenegrin: Planina) is a 2026 documentary film directed by Biljana Tutorov and Petar Glomazić. Set in the remote highlands of Montenegro, it follows a shepherd mother and daughter who proudly defend their ancestral mountain from the threat of becoming a NATO military training ground.

The film had its world premiere at the 2026 Sundance Film Festival on 26 January 2026, where it won the Grand Jury Prize - World Cinema Documentary. It was also selected as the Montenegrin entry for the Best International Feature Film at the 99th Academy Awards.

== Synopsis ==
In the remote highlands of Montenegro's Sinjajevina plateau, Gara and her thirteen-year-old daughter Nada return to their ancestral pastures every summer, where they herd animals, gather herbs and live in symbiosis with the mountain they call “Mother.” But their fragile world comes under threat when the Montenegrin government advances plans for a NATO-backed military training ground in the heart of this protected landscape. Gara emerges as an unexpected leader in the fight to defend Sinjajevina but, as Nada grows into young womanhood, the encroaching violence on the land awakens questions about her past, her future and the cycle of harm within her family she hopes to break.

== Production ==
To Hold a Mountain's Executive Producers include Megan Gelstein, Andrea Meditch, Bianca Oana, Jean Tsien, Petra Costa, Sean Flynn, Ben Fowlie, Lucila Moctezuma, Chandra Jessee, Rebecca Lichtenfeld, Megha Agrawal Sood, Shanida Scotland, Meadow Fund, Julie Parker Benello, and Jenni Wolfson.

== Release ==
The film had its world premiere at the 2026 Sundance Film Festival on 26 January 2026, where it won the Grand Jury Prize - World Cinema Documentary. When presenting To Hold A Mountain with the Grand Jury Prize - World Cinema Documentary, the 2026 Sundance Film Festival Jury wrote: "This visually and emotionally stunning film transported us to a remote mountain top and into the most intimate moments of a family fighting to protect not only their land, but their way of life. The truest example of the power of cinema to make the personal political".

It was also screened at True/False, CPH:DOX, Cinema du Reel, Visions du Reel, Seattle International Film Festival, Full Frame, and Hot Docs among many other festivals. The film was also part of the 73rd Sydney Film Festival International Documentaries, where it was screened on 8 June 2026. On 7 August it was screened in the Melbourne International Film Festival in Documentaries Program Strand for its Victorian Premiere. It had its Regional Premiere on 15 August 2026 at the 32nd Sarajevo Film Festival, where it won the Heart of Sarajevo award in the Competition Programme – Documentary Film 2026.

== Reception ==
=== Critical response ===
On review aggregator Rotten Tomatoes, the film holds an approval rating of 94% based on 16 reviews, with an average rating of 6.9/10.

Writing for Variety, Murtada Elfadl called To Hold A Mountain "an emotionally shattering meditation on grief and perseverance." In Hammer to Nail, Christopher Reed said To Hold a Mountain was a "tender and deeply moving documentary about the true nature of heroism." A review written for Screen International called the film a "tender, immersive...masterful, empathetic documentary."

=== Accolades ===
| Award / Film Festival | Year | Category | Recipient(s) | Result | Ref. |
|---|---|---|---|---|---|
| Sundance Film Festival | 26 January 2026 | Grand Jury Prize - World Cinema Documentary | To Hold a Mountain | Won | |
| Minneapolis–Saint Paul International Film Festival | 19 April 2026 | Best Documentary | To Hold a Mountain | Won | |
| Millennium Docs Against Gravity | 17 May 2026 | Grand Prix | To Hold a Mountain | Won | |
| RiverRun International Film Festival | 25 April 2026 | Best Director of Documentary Feature | Biljana Tutorov, Petar Glomazić | Won | |
| Sarajevo Film Festival | 21 August 2026 | Heart of Sarajevo Award for Best Documentary Film | To Hold a Mountain | Won | |
| Cinema Eye Honors | 11 January 2027 | Outstanding Achievement in Nonfiction Feature Filmmaking | Biljana Tutorov, Petar Glomazić, Quentin Laurent, Rok Bicek, Eva Kraljević, George Cragg, Draško Adžić, Julij Zornik, Samo Jurca, Mileva Gara Jovanović, and Nada Stanišić | Pending | |
| Cinema Eye Honors | 11 January 2027 | Outstanding Achievement in Cinematography | Eva Kraljević | Pending | |
| European Film Awards | 16 January 2027 | Best European Film | To Hold a Mountain | Pending | |
| European Film Awards | 16 January 2027 | Best Documentary | To Hold a Mountain | Pending | |

== See also ==
- List of submissions to the 99th Academy Awards for Best International Feature Film
- List of Montenegrin submissions for the Academy Award for Best International Feature Film
