= Birds of War =

2026 documentary film

- Directed by: Janay Boulos; Abd Alkader Habak
- Written by: Janay Boulos; Abd Alkader Habak
- Produced by: Sonja Henrici; Janay Boulos; Abd Alkader Habak
- Cinematography: Janay Boulos; Abd Alkader Habak
- Edited by: Claire Ferguson; Will Hewitt; Tanya Singh
- Music by: Harpal Mudhar; Darren Sng
- Production companies: Habak Films; Sonja Henrici Creates
- Distributed by: Dogwoof
- Release date: January 24, 2026 (Sundance)
- Running time: 85 minutes
- Countries: United Kingdom; Syrian Arab Republic; Lebanon
- Languages: Arabic; English

Birds of War is a 2026 documentary film directed and written by Janay Boulos and Abd Alkader Habak, and produced by Sonja Henrici, Boulos, and Habak. It premiered in the World Cinema Documentary Competition at the 2026 Sundance Film Festival, where it won the Special Jury Award for Journalistic Impact.

== Premise ==
The film follows the love story of Boulos, a London-based Lebanese journalist and Habak, a Syrian activist and cameraman, who met in 2016, when she was a BBC journalist seeking footage and he was a freelance cameraman in Aleppo during the Syrian civil war. The film is composed of 13 years of their personal archives spanning revolutions, war, and exile.

== Festival Release ==
Birds of War premiered at the World Cinema Documentary Competition at the 2026 Sundance Film Festival. In December 2025, Dogwoof acquired the sales rights for Birds of War.

In March 2026, it had its European premiere in the International Competition at the Thessaloniki International Documentary Festival.

The documentary was the closing film for the Berlin Human Rights Film Festival, participated in the Wide Angle competition at Visions du Réel in Nyon, Switzerland, and had its Canadian premiere at the Hot Docs Canadian International Documentary Festival in the World Showcase category. It also screened in San Luis Obispo International Film Festival, Fort Myers Film Festival, DOCLANDS Documentary Film Festival and Seattle International Film Festival in the USA.

In June, 2026, the film had its UK Premiere at Sheffield DocFest where it received a Special Mention in the Tim Hetherington Award.

Additional festivals include Amman International Film Festival (Arab Premiere) Busan International Film Festival (Asian Premiere) and Vancouver International Film Festival.

== Theatrical Release ==
The UK theatrical release for Birds of War, led by Dogwoof, took place in July where the film was released in major cinemas across the UK and Ireland including a Premier at the Curzon in Soho.

Birds of War will be released in US theatres via 8 Above Films.

== Awards ==
Birds of War won the Special Jury Award for Journalistic Impact at the 2026 Sundance Film Festival where it has its World premiere.

Following its European premiere at the 2026 Thessaloniki International Documentary Film Festival, Birds of War won four awards: the Silver Alexander in the International Competition, the FIPRESCI Award for Best Feature Documentary, the Human Rights in Motion Award by the Parliamentary Assembly of the Council of Europe (PACE) and the Women in Film and TV (WIFT GR) Award for a Female Contribution Behind or in Front of the Camera.

The Audience Award at 57th edition of Visions du Réel also went to Birds of War by Janay Boulos and Abd Alkader Habak which was part of the Wide Angle competition.

In June, 2026, the film had its UK Premiere at Sheffield DocFest where it received a Special Mention in the Tim Hetherington Award.
