= Living with a Visionary =

2026 American animated short film

- Directed by: Stephen P. Neary
- Produced by: Stephen P. Neary; Mireia Vilanova
- Starring: James Cromwell; Katherine LaVictoire
- Music by: Simon Panrucker
- Production companies: Cartuna; Garden Shed
- Distributed by: The New York Times Op-Docs
- Release date: 2026
- Running time: 15 minutes
- Country: United States

Living with a Visionary is a 2026 American animated short film written and directed by Stephen P. Neary and produced by Cartuna and Garden Shed Productions. The 15-minute animated film about a couple dealing with illness based on John Matthias' memoir has been awarded in various international film festivals, including Sundance.

== Plot ==
Living with a Visionary follows retired Notre Dame English professor John Matthias as he becomes the primary caregiver for his wife, Diana, an art curator with Parkinson's whose medication causes hallucinations. When the COVID-19 pandemic forces their physical separation, John is force to adapt to the challenge of long-term care for both Diana and himself, as well as the heartache of living apart.

== Accolades ==
Since its release, the film has been selected in various festivals around the world:

Year	Festivals	Award/Category	Status
2026	Sundance Film Festival	Short Film Jury Award for Animation	Won
2026	Santa Barbara Film Festival	Best Short Film	Nominated
2026	Indy Shorts International Film Festival	Audience Choice Award	Won
2026	Fest Anča International Animation Festival	Best Short Film	Nominated
2026	Silver Frame Film Festival	Best International Short Film	Won
2026	Sidewalk Film Festival	Audience Choice Film Awards - Best Narrative Short	Won
2026	Woodstock Film Festival	Best Animated Short	Nominated
2026	American Film Institute Festival	Grand Jury Award for Animation	Won
2026	Bucheon International Animation Festival	Special Distinction Prize, International Competition	Won
2026	Philadelphia Film Festival	Best Short Film	Won
