= Who Killed Alex Odeh? =

Upcoming documentary film by Jason Osder and William Lafi Youmans

- Directed by: Jason Osder; William Lafi Youmans
- Produced by: Dawne Langford; William Lafi Youmans; Jason Osder; Daniel J. Chalfen
- Edited by: Tyler H. Walk; Anne Alvergue
- Music by: Dana Kaproff
- Production companies: Parked Bus Productions; Naked Edge Films
- Distributed by: Watermelon Pictures
- Release dates: January 26, 2026 (Sundance); October 30, 2026
- Running time: 83 minutes
- Country: United States
- Languages: English; Hebrew; Arabic

Who Killed Alex Odeh? is a 2026 American documentary film directed by Jason Osder and William Lafi Youmans. It investigates the 1985 assassination of Palestinian-American activist Alex Odeh.

The film premiered in the U.S. Documentary Competition at the 2026 Sundance Film Festival, where it won the Special Jury Award for Journalistic Excellence. It had its international premiere out of competition of the 76th Berlin International Film Festival on February 17, and was released on October 30, 2026, by Watermelon Pictures.

== Premise ==
The film documents the assassination of Alex Odeh, a Palestinian-American activist, teacher, and poet who was killed by a tripwire bomb in his office in Santa Ana, California, in October 1985. The directors use archival footage and contemporary investigation to trace the 40-year inquiry into the case. They identify extremist forces potentially behind the attack and examine the lack of accountability that followed.

== Production ==
The film is co-directed by Jason Osder and William Lafi Youmans. Osder is known for the archival documentary Let the Fire Burn (2013). Youmans is a scholar of journalism and an associate professor at George Washington University.

The project began development more than a decade prior to its release. In 2014, the directors received a grant from the Sundance Institute Documentary Film Program to investigate the circumstances of Odeh's death. In 2023, Osder and Youmans were awarded the Alex Odeh Award by the American-Arab Anti-Discrimination Committee (ADC) for their work on the film.

The film is produced by Dawne Langford and Daniel J. Chalfen of Naked Edge Films, alongside the directors. It features music by composer Dana Kaproff.

== Release ==
Who Killed Alex Odeh? was announced as part of the U.S. Documentary Competition at the 2026 Sundance Film Festival on December 10, 2025. It premiered on January 26, 2026 and won the Special Jury Award for Journalistic Excellence. The film had its international premiere on February 17, 2026 at the 76th Berlin International Film Festival in the section "Berlinale Special Presentation". In June 2026, the North American distribution rights were acquired by Watermelon Pictures. It was released on October 30, 2026.
