= 1981 (2025 film) =

2025 film directed by Andy London and Carolyn London

- Theatrical Poster
- Directed by: Andy London; Carolyn London
- Screenplay by: Andy London; Carolyn London
- Produced by: Andy London; Carolyn London
- Starring: Minnie Tonka; Alexei London
- Cinematography: Kim Bunce; Tom Bergmann
- Edited by: Carolyn London
- Release date: 2025
- Running time: 8 minutes
- Country: United States
- Language: English

1981 is a 2025 American animated short film written and directed by Andy London and Carolyn London. The film is a rotoscoped animated film exploring the beauty and terror of teenage desire. Set to era-defining music from Joan Jett and Judas Priest, it captures the longing, anxiety, and humor of coming of age. 1981 was selected to the 2026 Sundance Film Festival and won Best Animated Short at the 2026 Florida Film Festival.

== Synopsis ==
Long Island, 1981. It's Douglas's 14th birthday party, and his parents have a surprise for him he'll never forget. His friends arrive expecting a Kiss concert or a trip to Action Park. Instead, they become witnesses to an event that will reshape their world for the rest of their lives. Rotoscoped animation captures the collision of curiosity, confusion, and desire in a distorted memory story with a precision live action can't reach. 1981 is a portrait of the adult world as fourteen-year-olds first truly see it: seductive, unsettling, and impossible to unsee.

== Cast ==
- Alexei London as Douglas
- Minnie Tonka as Dancer
- Carolyn London as the Mother
- Tony DiMurro as the Father

== Accolades ==
1981 has been selected in various film festivals, including Sundance Film Festival, Edinburgh Film Festival, and the Woodstock Film Festival, where it premiered in 2025. The film also won Best Animated Short at the 2026 Florida Film Festival and received the Best Short Film nomination at the 2026 Sundance Film Festival.
