= The Incomer =

2026 British film

- Theatrical release poster
- Directed by: Louis Paxton
- Written by: Louis Paxton
- Produced by: Shirley O'Connor; Emily Gotto
- Starring: Domhnall Gleeson; Gayle Rankin; Grant O'Rourke; Emun Elliott; Michelle Gomez; John Hannah
- Cinematography: Pat Golan
- Edited by: Brian Philip Davis
- Music by: Tom Kingston
- Production companies: BFI; Screen Scotland; Pilea Pictures
- Distributed by: Universal Pictures; Focus Features
- Release dates: 22 January 2026 (Sundance); 4 September 2026 (United Kingdom)
- Running time: 102 minutes
- Country: United Kingdom
- Language: English
- Box office: $1 million

The Incomer is a 2026 British comedy film written and directed by Louis Paxton and starring Domhnall Gleeson, Gayle Rankin, Grant O'Rourke, Emun Elliott, Michelle Gomez, and John Hannah. The film had its world premiere in the Sundance Film Festival's NEXT section in 2026, where it won the NEXT Innovator Award.

The Incomer had its theatrical release in the United Kingdom and Ireland on 4 September 2026 and received positive reviews from critics.

== Plot ==
On the fictional remote Scottish island 'Auk Island', siblings Isla and Sandy have lived alone for 30 years. They hunt seabirds for food, and train themselves to fight off "incomers" from the Scottish mainland. Isla also sees visions of a Finman, who attempts to convince her to drown herself in the island's waters. Scottish council worker Daniel arrives to evict the pair by order of his cruel boss Roz, and is attacked and tied up. Sandy eventually takes an interest in Daniel, and soon proclaims him a friend. When Isla orders Daniel to be killed, Sandy threatens suicide, with Daniel leaping into the water to save him.

After some tension, Daniel earns the pair's fondness after telling them a parody version of The Lord of the Rings, which he claims to have written. Isla also tells stories of a ceremonial drowning on the island, "Giving Oneself to the Sea", with the pair's father being revealed to have died this way. They hold an improvised ritual for Daniel, 'The Way of the Gull', and eventually accept him as one of their own. Isla and Daniel continue to bond, and they quickly develop romantic feelings for one another.

Meanwhile, Roz has sent suspended and deranged council worker Calum to the island to continue the eviction, who attacks Isla and is in turn tied up. Isla takes Daniel on a romantic excursion across the island - ignoring a jealous Sandy - and proposes marriage to him. She also reveals the pair's mother to have been a mainlander who died after their father delayed her return to the mainland after she fell ill. Daniel attempts to convince Isla to leave the island, but she grows angry, particularly after Daniel lies about his own mainland life being a happy one.

Sandy, who has also developed romantic feelings for Daniel, attacks him before they are distracted by an escaping Calum. Daniel and Isla fight, with Daniel arguing that their mother's death was caused not by the return to the mainland, but their father forcing her to stay on the island too long, revealing the various ceremonial rites the siblings have been practising to be fictitious. A distraught Isla goes to drown herself at the Finman's bequest, but stops when she realises she is merely continuing the cycle of acting on other people's desires instead of her own. Roz arrives with a security detail to evict the islanders, and Isla and Sandy attempt to fend them off. The pair are overpowered, but are rescued by Daniel, who uses birdseed to cause the island's gulls to swarm the council workers. He threatens to reveal Roz's cruelty, and her decision to send the suspended Calum to the island, to the council, convincing them to leave. Believing he has no place with Isla and Daniel, Sandy attempts to drown himself, convincing Isla to finally leave the island.

Isla narrates the film's ending, revealing that they now live a happy life on the mainland, with Daniel more comfortable at his job, Sandy having found a boyfriend, and her telling her stories to enraptured crowds. She relishes in her newfound freedom, and occasionally returns to the island to spend time alone - it now being a Wildlife reserve.

== Cast ==
- Domhnall Gleeson as Daniel
- Gayle Rankin as Isla
- Grant O'Rourke as Sandy
- Emun Elliott as Calum
- Michelle Gomez as Roz
- John Hannah as Finman

== Production ==
=== Development ===
Director Louis Paxton said the film was inspired by his family's Orcadian heritage. He described the film as "heartfelt, odd and absurdly funny" and cited the films Hunt for the Wilderpeople (2016) and Step Brothers (2008) as influences.

The film was produced by Shirley O'Connor and Emily Gotto under the UK banner Pilea Pictures, with Wendy Griffin as co-producer. Backers include the BFI, Screen Scotland, Head Gear, and Ireland's Inevitable Pictures. Executive producers include Trevor Noah and musician Moby through their respective companies Day Zero Productions and Little Walnut.

=== Filming ===
Principal photography took place in Caithness and various Scottish Highlands locations in summer 2025.

== Release ==
The film had its world premiere in the NEXT section at the 2026 Sundance Film Festival on January 22, 2026, winning the NEXT Innovator Award. It was also available online for public viewing from 29 January to 1 February 2026 through the festival's at-home program. In February 2026, Sumerian Pictures acquired North American distribution rights to the film, planning to release on September 25, 2026. In May 2026, Focus Features acquired international rights to the film, with its parent company Universal Pictures later scheduling the film for a theatrical release in the United Kingdom and Ireland on September 4, 2026.

== Reception ==
=== Critical response ===
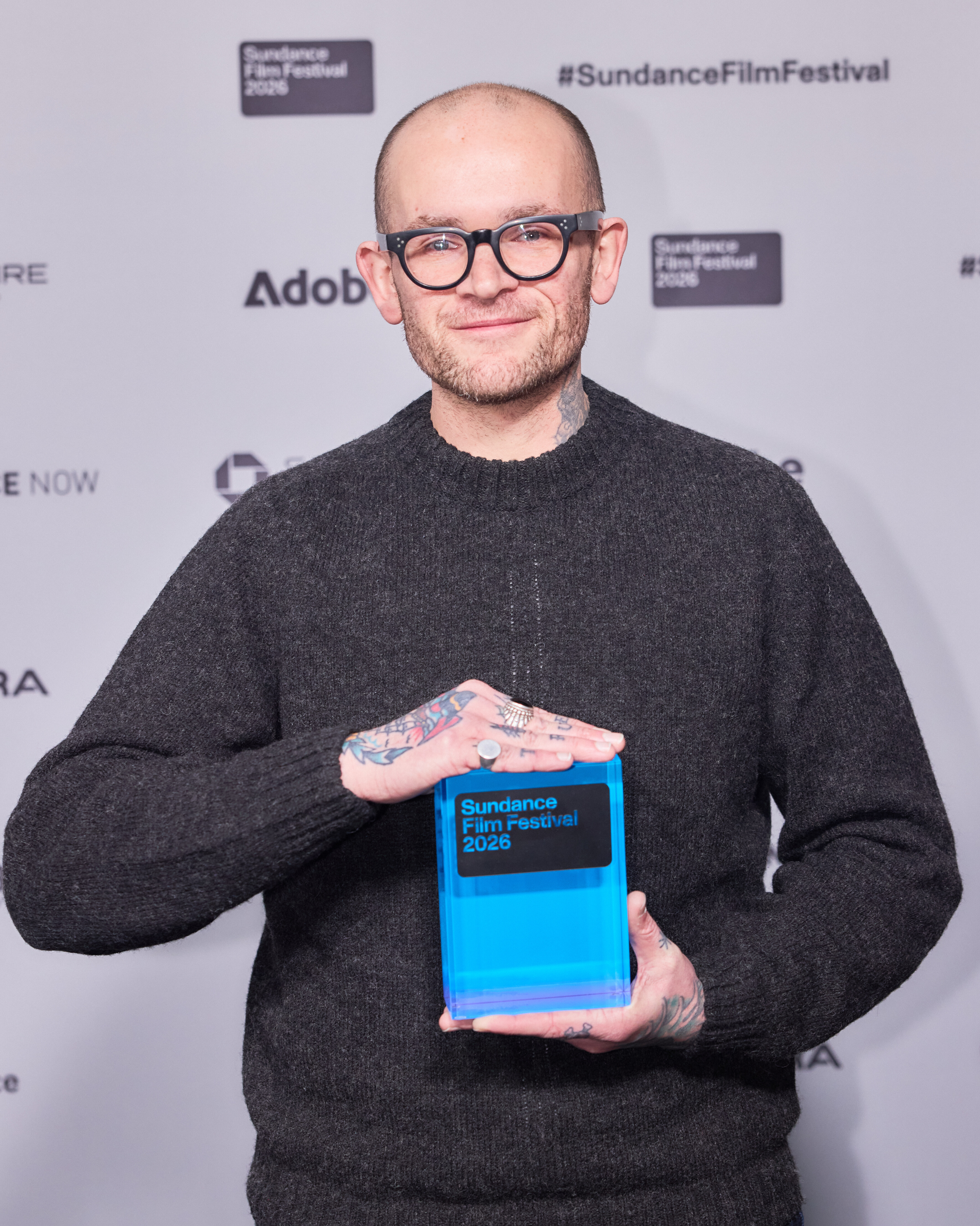
Director Louis Paxton at the 2026 Sundance Film Festival Awards

On the review aggregator website Rotten Tomatoes, 95% of 63 critics' reviews are positive, with an average rating of 7.3/10. The website's consensus reads: "The Incomer's inviting performances and quirky edge make it a refreshingly good-natured character study of human connection."

Tom Dawson of Screen Daily called the film "a charming, defiantly regional human drama" with "a trio of strong performances," comparing its tone to The Ballad of Wallis Island meets The Wicker Man. Nick Schager of The Daily Beast described it as "winningly weird" with "a wittiness that's almost as odd as its heart is big," praising Rankin's performance and comparing the film to The Banshees of Inisherin. Fred Topel of UPI wrote that it is "exactly the kind of charming comedy that stands out in indie cinema."

Adrian Horton wrote in The Guardian: "From the first shots of Isla (Gayle Rankin) and Sandy (Grant O’Rourke) caw-caw-ing like birds and beating sacks labelled 'incomer' with clubs, Paxton commits to an askew, often alienating angle of humour – quirky, at times juvenile, a touch dark, altogether difficult to settle into for anyone with an aversion to twee." In Variety, Tomris Laffly wrote: "Louis Paxton’s seaside tale starring Domhnall Gleeson alongside the terrific duo Gayle Rankin and Grant O’Rourke is too twee at times, but still winsome and disarmingly good-natured."

=== Accolades ===
The Incomer won the NEXT Innovator Award at the 2026 Sundance Film Festival.
