= 2026 Seattle International Film Festival =

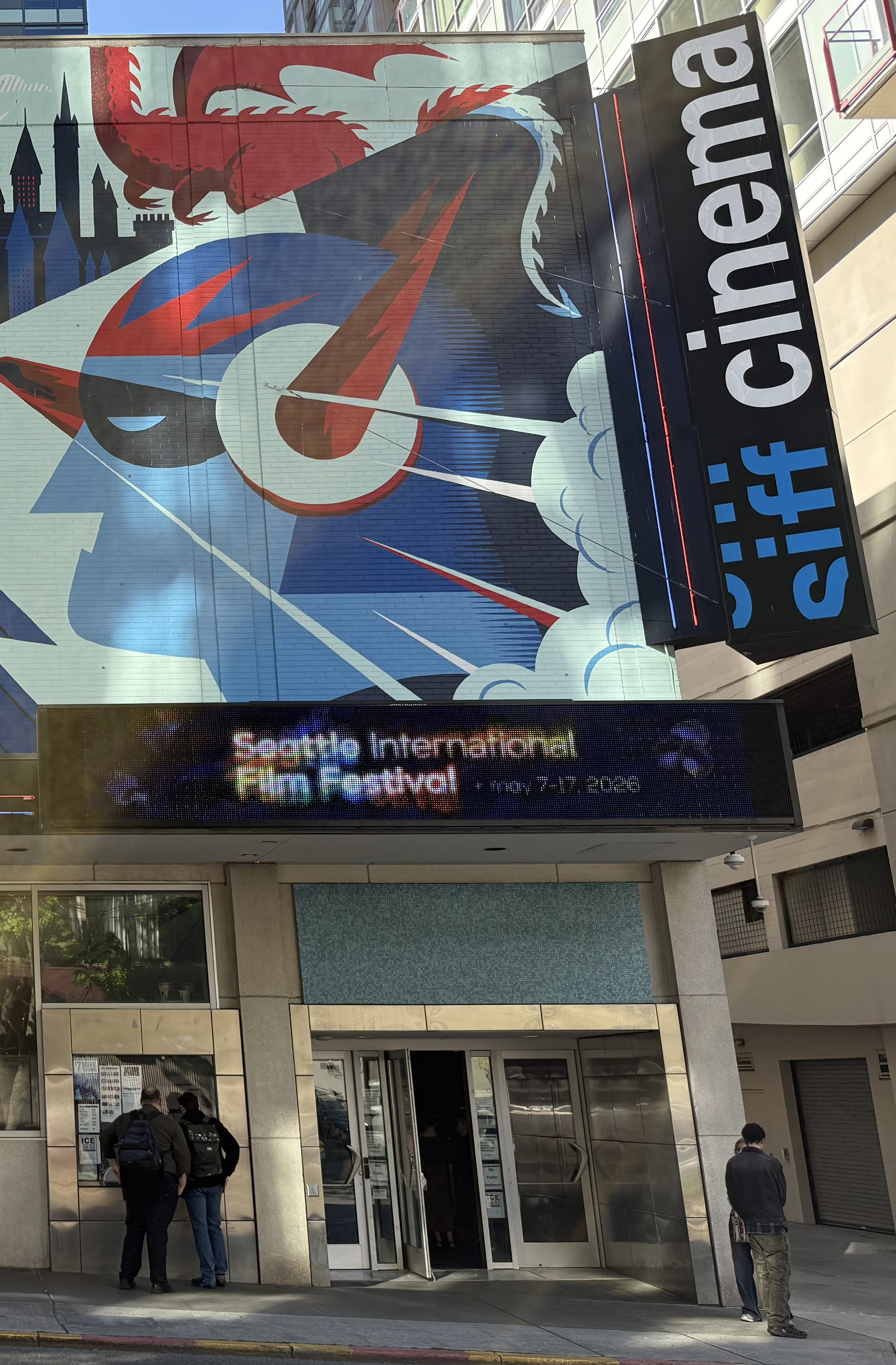
- SIFF Downtown marquee for the 2026 festival
- Opening film: I Love Boosters
- Closing film: The Invite
- Location: Seattle, Washington, U.S.
- Founded: 1976
- Hosted by: Seattle International Film Festival (SIFF)
- Festival date: May 7–17 in person
- Language: English
- Website: Seattle International Film Festival 2026
- 2027 Seattle International Film Festival 2025 Seattle International Film Festival

The 2026 Seattle International Film Festival, or SIFF 2026, is a film festival that was screened in theaters from May 7 to May 17, 2026. It consisted of 71 narrative features, 34 documentary features, and 98 short films. According to SIFF, there were 18 world premieres, 12 North American premieres, and 10 US Premieres.

The festival opened with I Love Boosters at the Paramount Theatre followed by a party afterwards at Cannonball Arts. The closing night film was The Invite. The RSVP-required community screening of Reservation Redemption occurred at the Seattle Central Library auditorium on the first Saturday of the festival.

The festival was entirely in person in 2026, having eliminated the virtual screenings that started in the midst of the COVID-19 pandemic and continued as part of a hybrid festival from 2022 through 2025. The 2026 festival also eliminated the closing-night party. SIFF reported an attendance of 44,841, an increase of more than 3,000 from the previous year.

== Venues ==
The festival occurred at the SIFF Cinema Uptown (3 screens), the SIFF Cinema Downtown, and two venues at Seattle Center, the SIFF Film Center and the PACCAR IMAX Theater. The venues were relatively close enough to each other (Note: The maximum walking distance is about 1.25 miles (2.01 km) between the SIFF Cinema Uptown and the SIFF Cinema Downtown.) and could be traversed on foot, by bus, (Note: See King County Metro and RapidRide.) or by monorail.

SIFF 2026 venues in Uptown, Seattle Center, and Belltown

== Festival programs ==
SIFF 2026 had a variety of film programs: Alternate Cinema, Archival Films, cINeDIGENOUS, Culinary Cinema, Documentary Films, Face the Music, Films4Families, New American Cinema, Northwest Connections, ShortsFest, WTF, and World Cinema. The latter included categories such as African Pictures, Asian Crossroads, Ibero-American Cinema, and others.

== Films ==
=== Narrative features ===
Title	Director(s)	Production country	Premiere	Comp.	Program	Ref.
100 Sunset	Kunsang Kyirong Tenzin	Canada			World	
Amrum	Fatih Akin	Germany			World	
Another World	Tommy Kai Chung Ng	Hong Kong			World	
April X	Michel K. Parandi	US, Romania		Amer.	New	
Assets & Liabilities	Zach Weintraub	US			NW	
Balandrau, Where the Fierce Wind Blew	Fernando Trullos	Spain	North American	IbA.	World	
Becoming Human	Polen Ly	Cambodia		Dir.	World	
Black Burns Fast	Sandulela Asanda	South Africa	North American		World	
Body Blow	Dean Francis	Australia, US			World	
Burn	Makoto Nagahisa	Japan		Off.	World	
Camp	Avalon Fast	Canada			WTF	
Case 137	Dominik Moll	France			World	
Chili Finger	Edd Benda, Stephen Helstad	US			New	
The Condor Daughter	Alvaro Olmos Torrico	Bolivia		IbA.	World	
Cotton Queen	Suzanna Mirghani	Germany, France, Palestine, Egypt, Qatar, Saudi Arabia, Sudan		Dir.	World	
Crystal Cross	Richie James Follin	US		Amer.	INDIG	
Deadline	Kiwi Chow	Taiwan, Hong Kong, UK	North American		World	
Droid	Mejbaur Rahman Sumon	Bangladesh			World	
Drunken Noodles	Lucio Castro	US, Argentina			New	
Edie Arnold Is a Loser	Megan Rico, Kade Atwood	US		Amer.	New	
En Route To	Yoo Jaein	South Korea			World	
Fifteen	Jack Zagha, Yossy Zagha	Mexico, Argentina		IbA.	WTF	
Franz	Agnieszka Holland	Czech Republic, Poland, Germany, Grance, Turkey			World	
The Friend's House Is Here	Hossein Keshavarz, Maryam Ataei	Iran		Off.	World	
The Furious	Kenji Tanigaki	Hong Kong, China			WTF	
The Garden We Dreamed	Joaquín del Paso	Mexico,	North American	IbA.	World	
Gaua	Paul Urkijo	Spain	North American		WTF	
Happy Birthday	Sarah Goher	Egypt		Dir.	World	
Hen	György Pálfi	Germany			World	
Hijra	Shahad Ameen	Saudi Arabia, Iraq, Egypt, UK		Dir.	World	
Hot Water	Ramzi Bashour	US		Amer.	New	
I Want Your Sex	Gregg Araki	US			New	
If I Go Will They Miss Me	Walter Thompson-Hernández	US			New	
It Would Be Night in Caracas	Mariana Rondón, Marité Ugás	Mexico, Venezuela		IbA.	World	
Iván & Hadoum	Ian de la Rosa	Spain, Germany, Belgium	North American	IbA.	World	
Lady	Samuel Abrahams	UK	North American	Off.	World	
Late Fame	Kent Jones	US			New	
Lucky Lu	Lloyd Lee Choi	US, Canada		Amer.	New	
Mārama	Taratoa Stappard	New Zealand		Off.	INDIG	
Maspalomas	Aitor Arregi, Jose Mari Goenaga	Spain			World	
Meadowlarks	Tasha Hubbard	Canada			INDIG	
Murder in the Building	Rémi Bezançon	France	North American		World	
Obsession	Curry Barker	US			WTF	
Primavera	Damiano Michieletto	Italy, France			World	
Prisoners of the Earth	Mario Soffici	Argentina			Arch.	
Promised Sky	Erige Sehiri	Tunisia			World	
Queen Kelly	Erich von Stroheim	US			Arch.	
The Red Hanger	Juan Pablo Sallato	Chile, Argentina, Italy		IbA.	World	
Renoir	Chie Hayakawa	Japan, France, Singapore, Philippines, Indonesia, Qatar, US			World	
The Restoration at Grayson Manor	Glenn McQuaid	Ireland			WTF	
Salvation	Emin Alper	Turkey, France, Netherlands, Greece, Sweden, Saudi Arabia			World	
See You When I See You	Jay Duplas	US			New	
Shape of Momo	Tribeny Rai	India, South Korea		Dir.	World	
Silent Friend	Ildikó Enyedi	Germany, Hungary		Off.	World	
The Songbirds' Secret	Antoine Lanciaux	France			Fam.	
Sons of the Neon Night	Juno Mak	Hong Kong, China			World	
Strange River	Jaume Claret Muxart	Spain, Germany			World	
Sundays	Aluda Ruiz de Azúa	Spain		Off.	World	
Tell Everyone	Alli Haapasalo	Finland, Denmark	North American		World	
Three Goodbyes	Isabel Coixet	Italy, Spain			World	
Three of a Kind	Charlotte Brodthagen	Denmark	US	Dir.	World	
Trial of Hein	Kai Stänicke	Germany		Dir.	World	
Valentina	Tatti Ribeiro	US		Amer.	New	

=== Documentary features ===
Title	Director(s)	Production country	Premiere	Comp.	Program	Ref.
American Doctor	Poh Si Teng	US		Doc.		
Aanikoobijigan [ancestor/great-grandparent/great-grandchild]	Mia Moore, Heather Ballish	US	World		INDIG	
The Ascent	Edward Drake, Scott Veltri, Francis Cronin	US				
Barbara Forever	Brydie O'Connor	US				
Beat the Lotto	Ross Whitaker	Ireland				
The Best Summer	Tamra Davis	US				
The Big Cheese	Sara Joe Wolansky	US				
The Birds of War	Janay Boulos, Abd Alkader Habak	UK		Doc.		
Boorman and the Devil	David Kittredge	US				
Broken English	Iain Forsyth, Jane Pollard	UK				
Bucks Harbor	Peter Muller	US		Doc.		
Cookie Queens	Alysa Nahmias	US				
Cuba & Alaska	Yegor Troyanovsky	Ukraine				
Eight Bridges	James Benning	US			Alt.	
Ghost in the Machine	Valerie Veatch	US				
Hanging by a Wire	Mohammed Ali Naqvi	Pakistan				
Jaripeo	Efraín Mojica, Rebecca Zweig	Mexico				
Kikuyu Land	Andrew H. Brown, Bea Wangondu	Kenya		Doc.		
The Life We Leave	JJ Gerber	US			NW	
Love Chaos Kin	Chithra Jeyaram	US				
Maintenance Artist	Toby Perl Freilich	US				
Nuisance Bear	Gabriela Osio Vanden, Jack Weisman	US		Doc.		
One of Our Own: A Tribute to Joan Roca	Jorge Fernández Mayoral, Virginia Jönas Urigüen	Spain				
Phoenix Jones: The Rise and Fall of a Real Life Superhero	Bayan Joonam	US			NW	
Powwow People	Sky Hopinka	US			INDIG	
RADIOHEART: The Drive and Times of DJ Kevin Cole	Peter Hilgendorf, Andrew Franks	US			NW	
Reservation Redemption	Brenda Fisher, Blake Pickens	US			INDIG	
Rising Through the Fray	Courtney Montour	Canada				
The Seoul Guardians	Jong-woo Kim, Shin-Wan Kim, Chul-Young Cho	South Korea	US	Doc.		
Soul Patrol	J.M. Harper	US				
To Hold a Mountain	Biljana Tutorov, Petar Glomazić	Serbia, France, Montenegro, Slovenia		Doc.		
Under a Million Stars	Chezik Tsunoda	US			NW	(Note: Under a Million Stars was a 2025 SIFF Grant for Courageous Documentary Filmmaking Awardee.)
When A Witness Recants	Dawn Porter	US				
Yo (Love is a Rebellious Bird)	Anna Fitch, Banker White	US				

=== Shorts ===
The ShortsFest consisted of these packages:

- Alt Shorts
- Animation4Adults
- Best of NFFTY 2026
- Brave New World
- The Family Picture Show
- Reality Check
- ShortsFest Opening Night
- Sound Visions
- Spacing OUT
- Teachings of the Elders
- WTF! Nightmare Fuel

Title	Director(s)	Production country	Package or Film	Ref.
A City Fights Back	Brandon Tauszik	US	The Seoul Guardians (doc.)	
Acid City	Jack Wedge, Will Freudenheim	US	Brave New World (pack.)	
Aquí nadie sabe quién fui	Vanessa Navari, Alejandra Villegas, Kate Vela	Mexico	Best of NFFTY 2026 (pack.)	
Are You Native?	Victoria Cheyenne	US	Powwow People (doc.)	
As Told by a Corpse	Yace Sula	US	Alt Shorts (pack.)	
At Night	Pooya Afzali	Iran	Animation4Adults (pack.)	
Bako Removal Act	Boma Iluma	Nigeria, US	Brave New World (pack.)	
The Baker's Hotline	Emily Schuman, Dave Schuman	US	The Big Cheese (doc.)	
Be Careful What You Ask For	Amie V Simon	US	WTF! Nightmare Fuel (pack.)	
Best of Luck	Alex Benson	US	Sound Visions (pack.)	
Blooky: The Book Who Wanted to Be Read	Pablo Diaz De Leon Hicks	US, Mexico, Canada	The Family Picture Show (pack.	
Brothers of Faith	Gákte Biera	Norway	Teachings of the Elders (pack.)	
Brown Morning	Carlo Vogele	Luxembourg, France	Animation4Adults (pack.)	
Burcu's Angels	Özgün Gündüz	Canada	Spacing OUT (pack.)	
Carcassone-Acapulco	Marjorie Caup, Olivier Héraud	France	Animation4Adults (pack.)	
Charlie is Not a Boy	Pol Kurucz	US, Hungary, France	Spacing OUT (pack.)	
Children & Animals	Walker Kalan	US	Reality Check (pack.)	
Correct Me If I'm Wrong	Hao Zhou	Germany, US, China	Reality Check (pack.)	
Dancing in the rain	Chao-chun Yeh	Japan, Taiwan	The Family Picture Show (pack.)	
Dick's-A-Thon	Dylan Young	US	Sound Visions (pack.)	
Diwata	Shea Formanes	US, Philippines	Sound Visions (pack.)	
Dog Alone	Marta Reis Andrade	Portugal, France	Animation4Adults (pack.)	
Embodied	Samuel Wright Smith	US, Canada	Best of NFFTY 2026 (pack.)	
Embrace	Matthew Rush	US	Spacing OUT (pack.)	
ERUCTATION	Victoria Trow	US	Reality Check (pack.)	
Facing the Sun	Mathew Cerf	US	Under a Million Stars (doc.)	
Fitted Sheet	Celia Beasley	US	Sound Visions (pack.)	
Flink's Pigeon Problems	Susan Fitzer, Brian Pimental	US, Spain	The Family Picture Show (pack.)	
Force Times Displacement	Angel Wu	Taiwan	Alt Shorts (pack.)	
The Gnawer of Rocks	Louise Flaherty	Canada	Teachings of the Elders (pack.)	
Haint	Jahmil Eady	US	WTF! Nightmare Fuel (pack.)	
Halal Dreams	Mohammed Mamdouh	United Arab Emirates	Valentina (nar.)	
Heartsick	MK Quane	Ireland	Beat the Lotto (pack.)	
Holy G Thy Angel	Jack-Henry Lee	US, UK	Animation4Adults (pack.)	
Homebodies	Rachel Olson	US	ShortsFest Opening Night (pack.)	
Homecoming	Skyler Knutzen	US	WTF! Nightmare Fuel (pack.)	
Honey, My Love, So Sweet	JT Trinidad	Philippines	Best of NFFTY 2026 (pack.)	
Horse Fly	Alex Park	US	Sound Visions (pack.)	
HUGS	Nicolas Fong	Belgium	Animation4Adults (pack.)	
Hyena	Altay Ulan Yang	China, US	Brave New World (pack.)	
I Found a Box	Ron Dyens, Eric Montchaud	France	The Family Picture Show (pack.)	
In the Heavenly Cutting Room	Emma Penaz Eisner	US	Alt Shorts (pack.)	
It's a Wonderful Night of the Living Dead	John Bell, Dan Bell	US	Alt Shorts (pack.)	
Katya	Timofey Pozhitkov	US	Sound Visions (pack.)	
The Last Cinnamon Roll	Michael Langan	US	Assets & Liabilities (pack.)	
Late Shift	Britta Johnson	US	Sound Visions (pack.)	
Latent Horizon	Julie Orser	US	The Family Picture Show (pack.)	
Little Stories, Big Echoes: Beads of Hope	Dawn Richard	US	The Family Picture Show (pack.)	
Man Eating Pussy	Emily Lawson	Canada, US	WTF! Nightmare Fuel (pack.)	
Materia	Alisi Telengut	Canada	Alt Shorts (pack.)	
Murmur	Ziyu Wang, Jinhong Yu	China	Animation4Adults (pack.)	
My Grandmother's Tipi	Lindsay Chewanish	Canada	Teachings of the Elders (pack.)	
My name is Lilith	Leo Luna Robert-Tourneur	Belgium, France	Spacing OUT (pack.)	
Night Plane	Salise Hughes	US	Alt Shorts (pack.)	
Nobody Knows the World	Roddy Dextre	Peru, Colombia, Spain, Mexico	ShortsFest Opening Night (pack.)	
Oh Whale	Winslow Crane-Murdoch	US	ShortsFest Opening Night (pack.)	
Once in a Body	María Cristina Pérez González	Colombia, US	Animation4Adults (pack.)	
Open Mic	Jano Pita	Spain	WTF! Nightmare Fuel (pack.)	
Ordinary Life	Yoriko Mizushiri	France, Japan	Animation4Adults (pack.)	
Otherworld	Lokotah Sanborn	US	Meadowlarks (nar.)	
Paper Trail	Don Hertzfeldt	US	ShortsFest Opening Night (pack.)	
PASALUBONG!	Sophia Uy	US, Philippines	Best of NFFTY 2026 (pack.)	
Patch	Meg Cook	US	The Family Picture Show (pack.)	
Plague Season	Gabriela Calvache	Ecuador, Spain, US	Brave New World (pack.)	
Praying Mantis	Joe Hsieh	Taiwan, Hong Kong	WTF! Nightmare Fuel (pack.)	
Ramon Who Speaks to Ghosts	Shervin Kermani	Spain, Mexico, Canada	Reality Check (pack.)	
Raptor	Libby Hakaraia	New Zealand	Mārama (nar.)	
refrigerator hum	Jade Wong	US	Alt Shorts (pack.)	
The Return	Marina Alofagia McCartney	New Zealand, US	Teachings of the Elders (pack.)	
The Road to Plan C	Morgan Dukes	US	Sound Visions (pack.)	
Roll Modelz	Yahir Tzec-Carasco, Oliver Rodriguez Dickson	US	Best of NFFTY 2026 (pack.)	
Scissors	Hannah Alline	US	WTF! Nightmare Fuel (pack.)	
Scout's Honor	Isabel Pask	US	Edie Arnold is a Loser (nar.)	
Scratch	Aliya Kamalova	US	ShortsFest Opening Night (pack.)	
Sea Song	An-Phuong Ly	US	Reality Check (pack.)	
Sea Star	Tyler Mckenzie Evans	Canada	ShortsFest Opening Night (pack.)	
Skin on Skin	Simon Schneckenburger	Germany	Spacing OUT (pack.)	
Still Standing	Victor Tadashi Suarez, Livia Albeck-Ripka	US	Reality Check (pack.)	
Story Drive: Voices Unveiled	Marcelese Cooper, Annalise Breaux	US	Spacing OUT (pack.)	
The Sun & the Wind	Soyeon Kim, Todd Hemker	US	The Family Picture Show (pack.)	
Sunny Oaks	Max Davies	UK	Best of NFFTY 2026 (pack.)	
Sunspark	Danny Bourque	US	The Family Picture Show (pack.)	
Talliyah	Fritz Bitsoie	US	Reservation Redemption (doc.)	
Tankha	Akexander Moruo (Sakha), Markel Martynov	Russia, New Zealand	The Family Picture Show (pack.)	
They	Renée Zellweger	UK	The Family Picture Show (pack.)	
The Things We Lose on Our Way to the Sky	Yaeji Kim	US	Best of NFFTY 2026 (pack.)	
Two Old Women	Princess Daazhraii Johnson	US	Teachings of the Elders (pack.)	
Visitors	Minnie Schedeen	US	Brave New World (pack.)	
Wall Udder	Alexandra Hayden	US	WTF! Nightmare Fuel (pack.)	
Water Sports	Whammy Alcazaren	Philippines	Alt Shorts (pack.)	
We Act Like Children	Evelyn Pakinewatik	Canada	Aanikoobijigan [ancestor/great-grandparent/great-grandchild] (doc.)	
We Get Better When We Tan Moose Hides	Brittany Woods-Orrison	USA, Canada, Greenland, Norway, Finland	Teachings of the Elders (pack.)	
We Were Here	Pranav Bhasin	India	Brave New World (pack.)	
WildKind	John McDaid	United Kingdom	The Family Picture Show (pack.)	
Winter in March	Natalia Mirzoyan	Estonia, Armenia	Reality Check (pack.)	
With Tapes and Toasts in the Car	Kiana Naghshineh	Germany, France	Animation4Adults (pack.)	
You & Me	Kiera Faber, Jes Reyes	US	Alt Shorts (pack.)	
Yugen	Nayelli Ojeda	Mexico	The Songbirds' Secret (nar.)	

== Film competitions and awards ==
There were several juried competitions for prequalified films:

- Official Competition
- Documentary Competition
- Ibero-American Competition
- New American Cinema Competition
- New Directors Competition

There was a juried competition for short films that has three categories, Live Action, Animation, and Documentary. All three categories qualify these films for the corresponding categories for the Academy Awards.

There was also the Golden Space Needle Awards, which are audience choices for "Best Film, Documentary Feature, Director, Performance, and Short Film."

=== Golden Space Needle Awards ===
The Golden Space Needle Awards are voted by the audience.

Golden Space Needle Awards winners
Award	Film title	Director(s) or actor	Country
Best Film	Edie Arnold is a Loser	Megan Rico, Kade Atwood	USA
Best Documentary	The Life We Leave	JJ Gerber	USA
Best Director	Silent Friend	Ildikó Enyedi	Germany/Hungary
Best Performance	Obsession	Inde Navarrette	USA
Best Short Film	The Gnawer of Rocks	Louise Flaherty	Canada

=== Juried Competition Awards ===
Jurors served several different juries. For feature films, there were juries for the official competition, documentaries, new directors, new American cinema, and Ibero-American. There were two short film juries, one for narrative films and another for documentary and animated films.

Feature film awards
Award	Film title	Director(s)	Country and year	Jury comment
Official Competition Grand Jury Prize	Mārama	Taratoa Stappard	New Zealand 2025	
Documentary Competition Grand Jury Prize	The Birds of War	Janay Boulos, Abd Alkader Habak	United Kingdom/Syria/Lebanon 2026	
Ibero-American Competition Grand Jury Prize	The Garden We Dreamed	Joaquín del Paso	Mexico 2026	
New American Cinema Competition Grand Jury Prize	Lucky Lu	Lloyd Lee Choi	USA/Canada 2025	
New Directors Competition Grand Jury Prize	Shape of Momo	Tribeny Rai	India/South Korea 2025	
Dan Ireland Prize	Hot Water	Ramzi Bashour	USA 2026	
Documentary Competition Special Jury Mention	The Seoul Guardians	Jong-woo Kim, Shin-Wan Kim, Chul-Young Cho	South Korea 2026	Recognized for "Courage and Democracy"
Ibero-American Competition Special Jury Mention	The Red Hanger	Juan Pablo Sallato	Chile/Argentina/Italy 2026	Recognized for Best Direction
Official Competition Special Jury Mention	Burn	Makoto Nagahisa	Japan 2026	Recognized as "Feel Bad Film of the Year"

Short film awards
Award	Film title	Director(s)	Country and year	Jury comment
Live Action Short Grand Jury Prize	Scout's Honor	Isabel Pask	USA	
Live Action Short Special Jury Mention	Nobody Knows the World	Roddy Dextre	Peru	
Documentary Short Grand Jury Prize	Still Standing	Victor Tadashi Suarez, Livia Albeck-Ripka	USA	
Documentary Short Special Jury Mention	The Baker's Hotline	Emily Schuman, Dave Schuman	USA	recognized as "Standout Heartwearing Tale”
Documentary Short Special Jury Mention	Dick's-A-Thon	Dylan Young	USA	recognized as "Spirit of Seattle”
Animated Short Grand Jury Prize	With Tapes and Toasts in the Car	Kiana Naghshineh	Germany/France	
Animated Short Special Jury Mention	The Gnawer of Rocks	Louise Flaherty	Canada	recognized as “Best Traditional Legend”
Animated Short Special Jury Mention	Acid City	Jack Wedge, Will Freudenheim	USA	recognized as “Most Visionary World-Building”
Animated Short Special Jury Mention	Paper Trail	Don Hertzfeldt	USA	recognized as “Standout Experimental Storytelling”

=== Additional awards ===
Additional award winners
Award	Film title	Director(s)	Country
2025 Seattle Film Critics Society Feature Film Award	Obsession	Curry Barker	United States
Lena Sharpe Award for Persistence of Vision	The Big Cheese	Sara Joe Wolansky	United States

== Gallery ==
SIFF 2026 venues
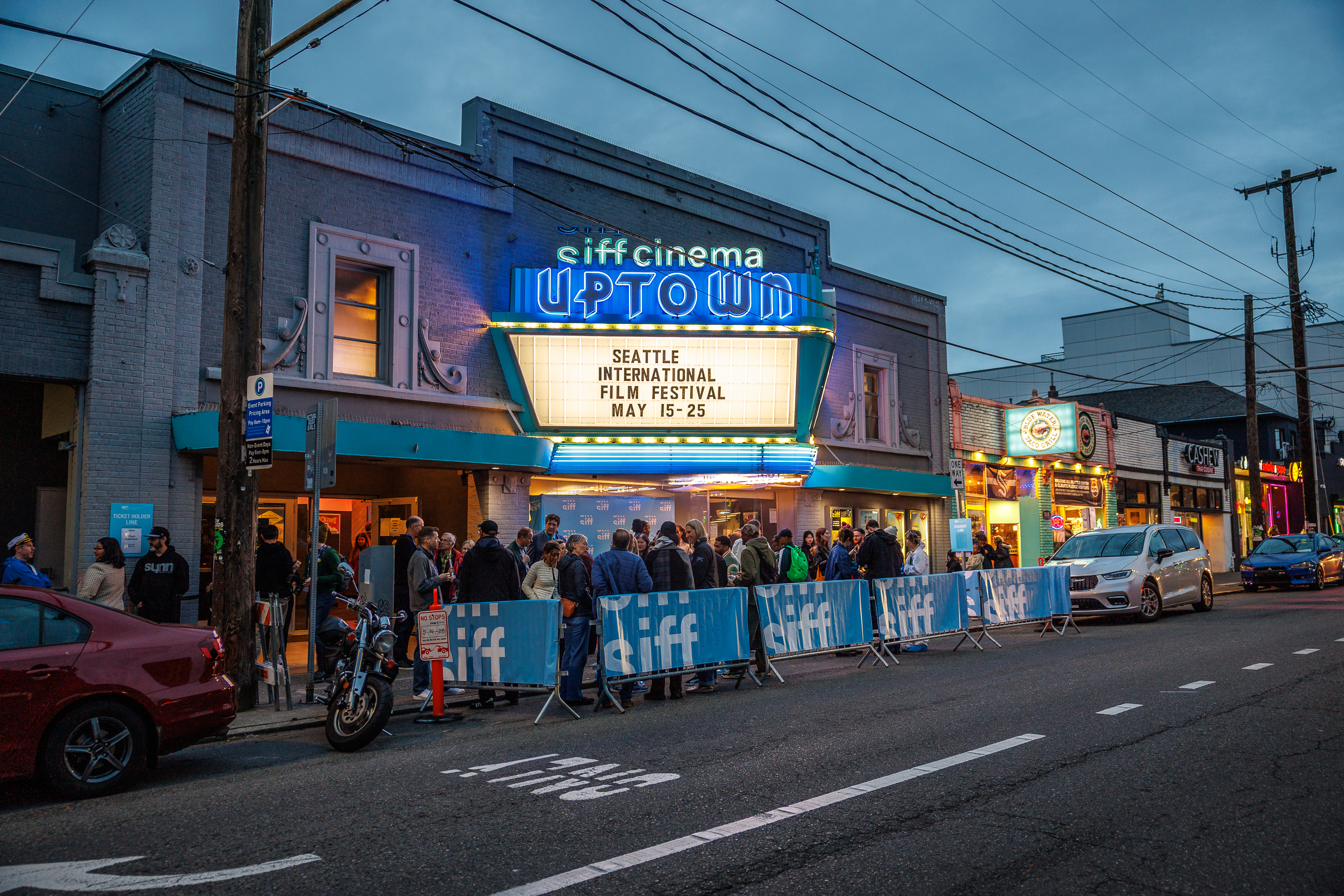
The SIFF Cinema Uptown during SIFF 2025

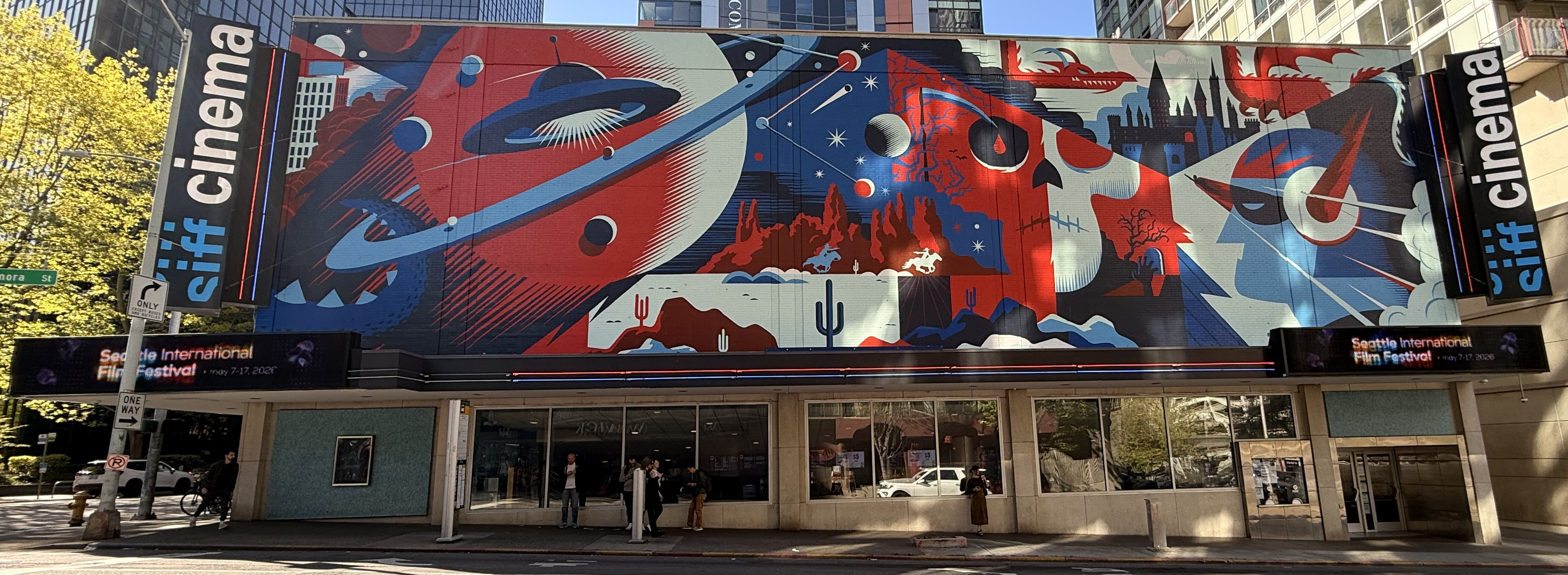
The SIFF Cinema Downtown

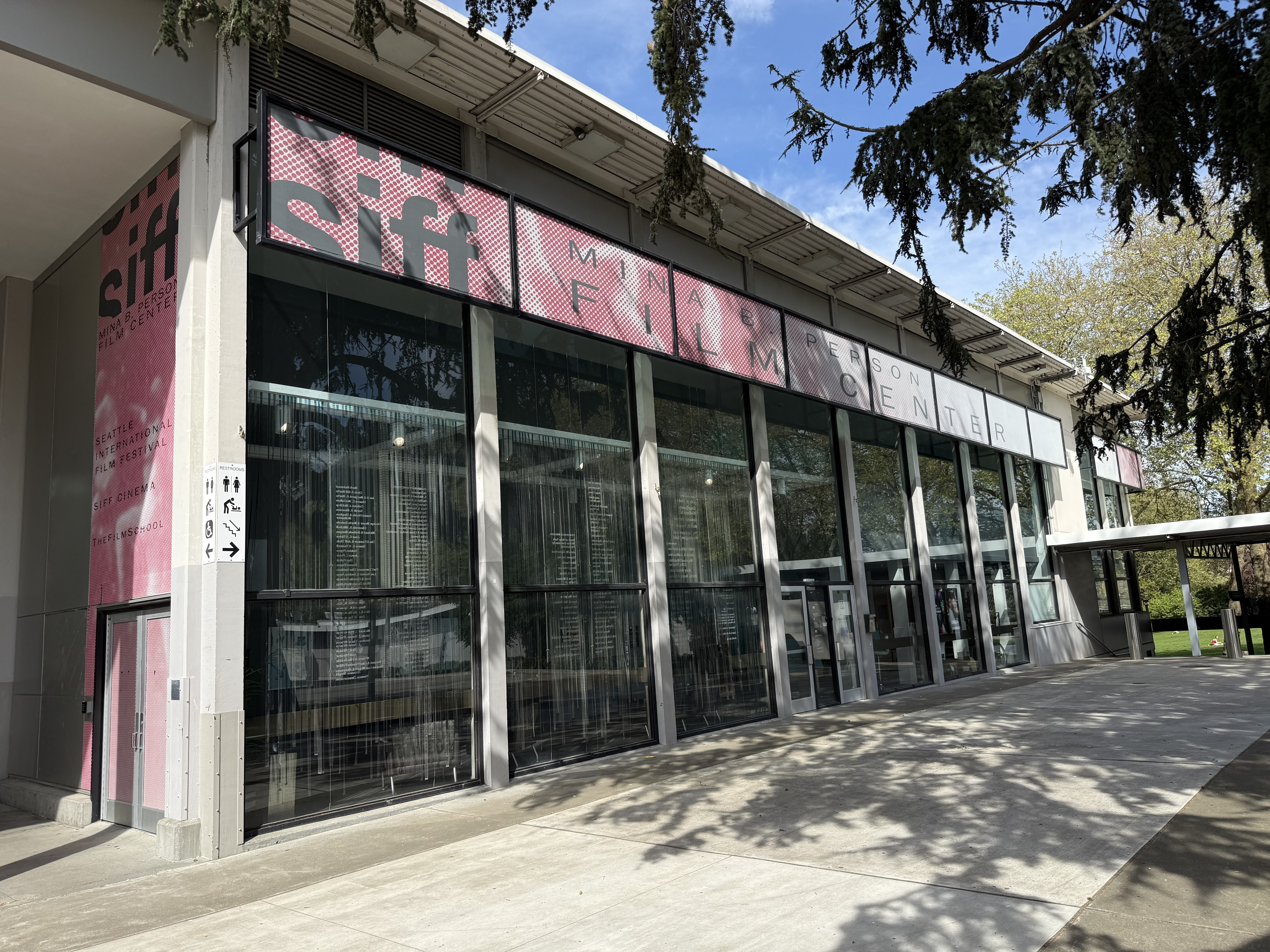
The SIFF Cinema Center

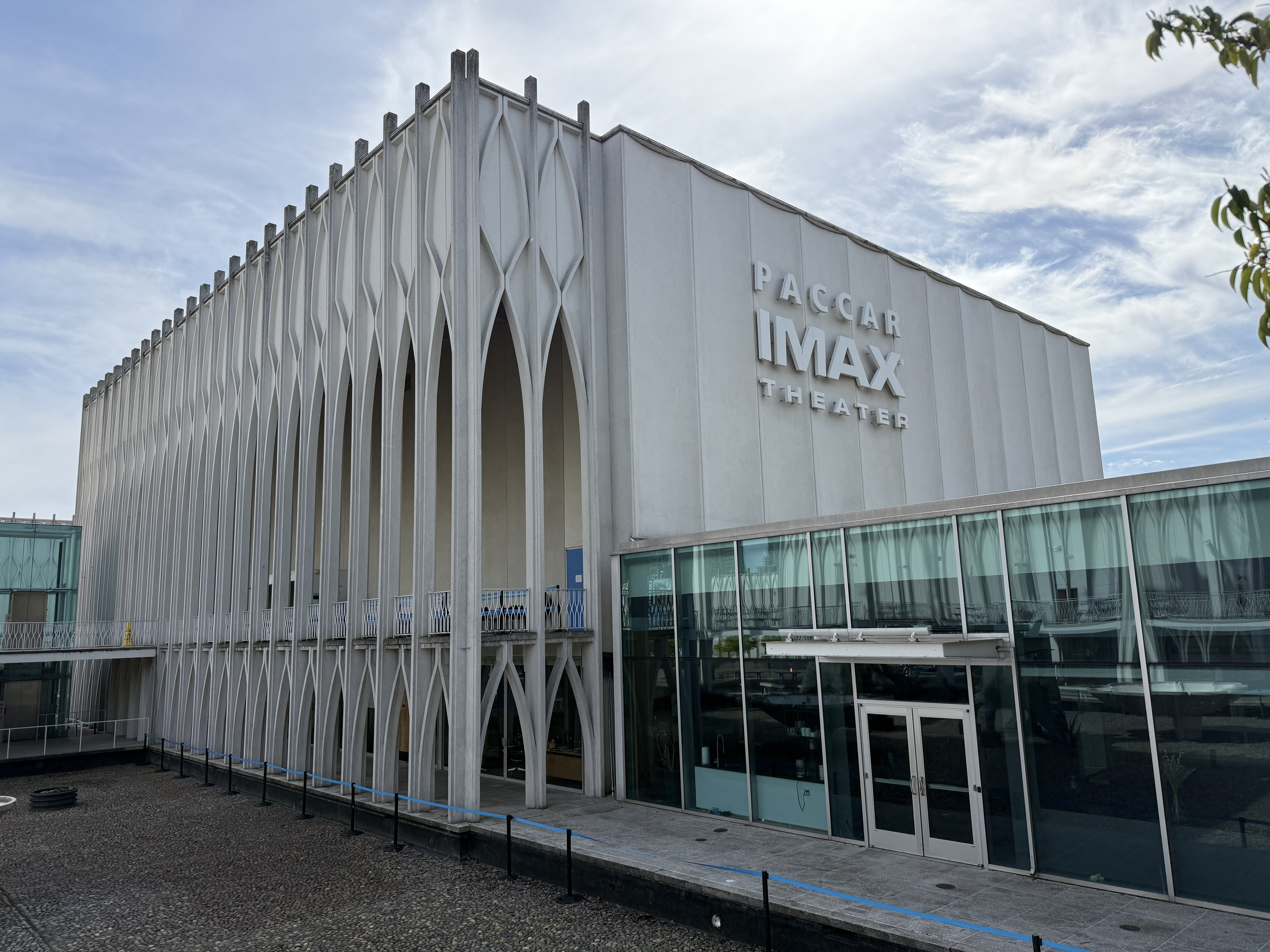
The Paccar IMAX Theater
SIFF 2026 guests
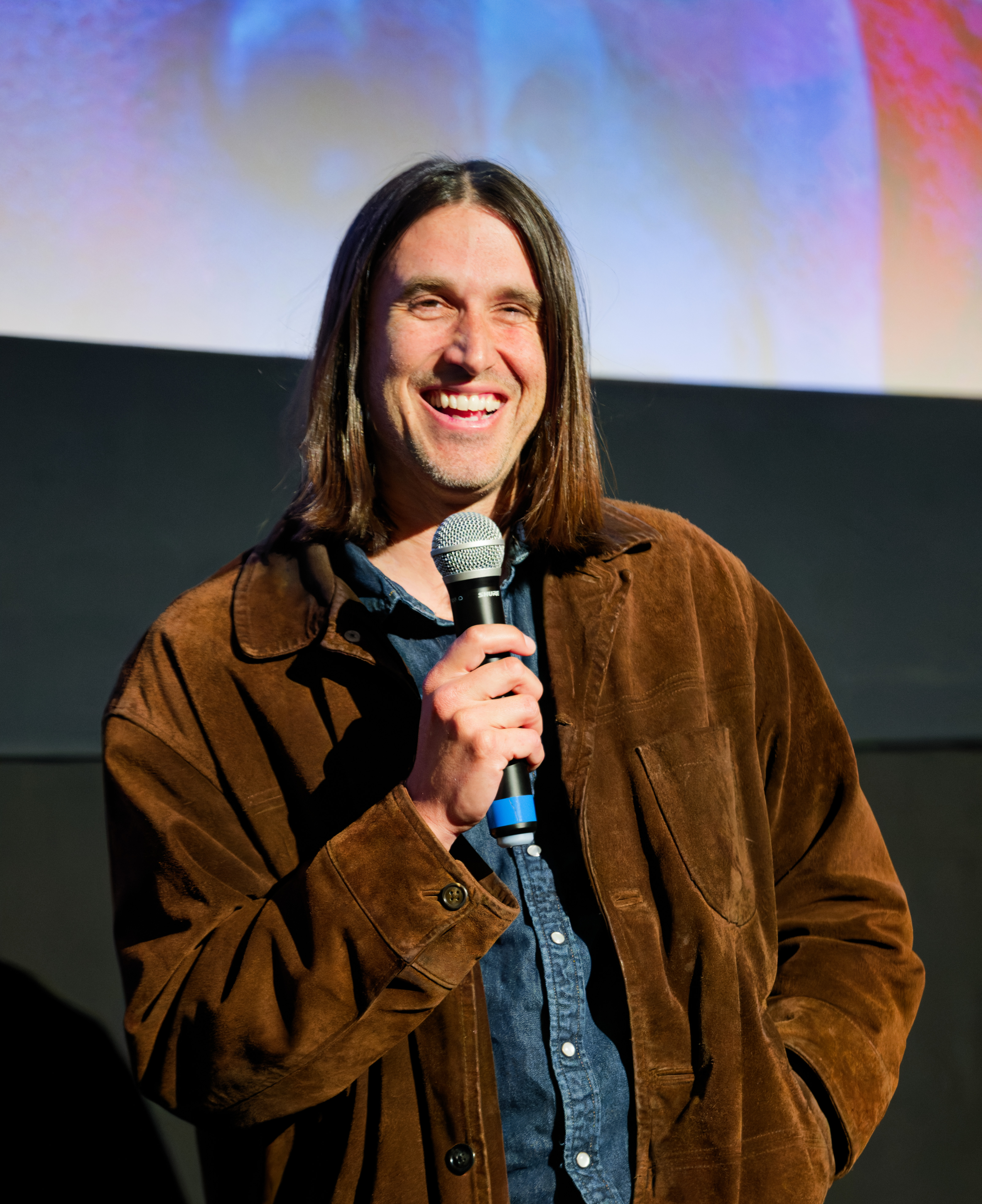
Richie Follin, director of Crystal Cross

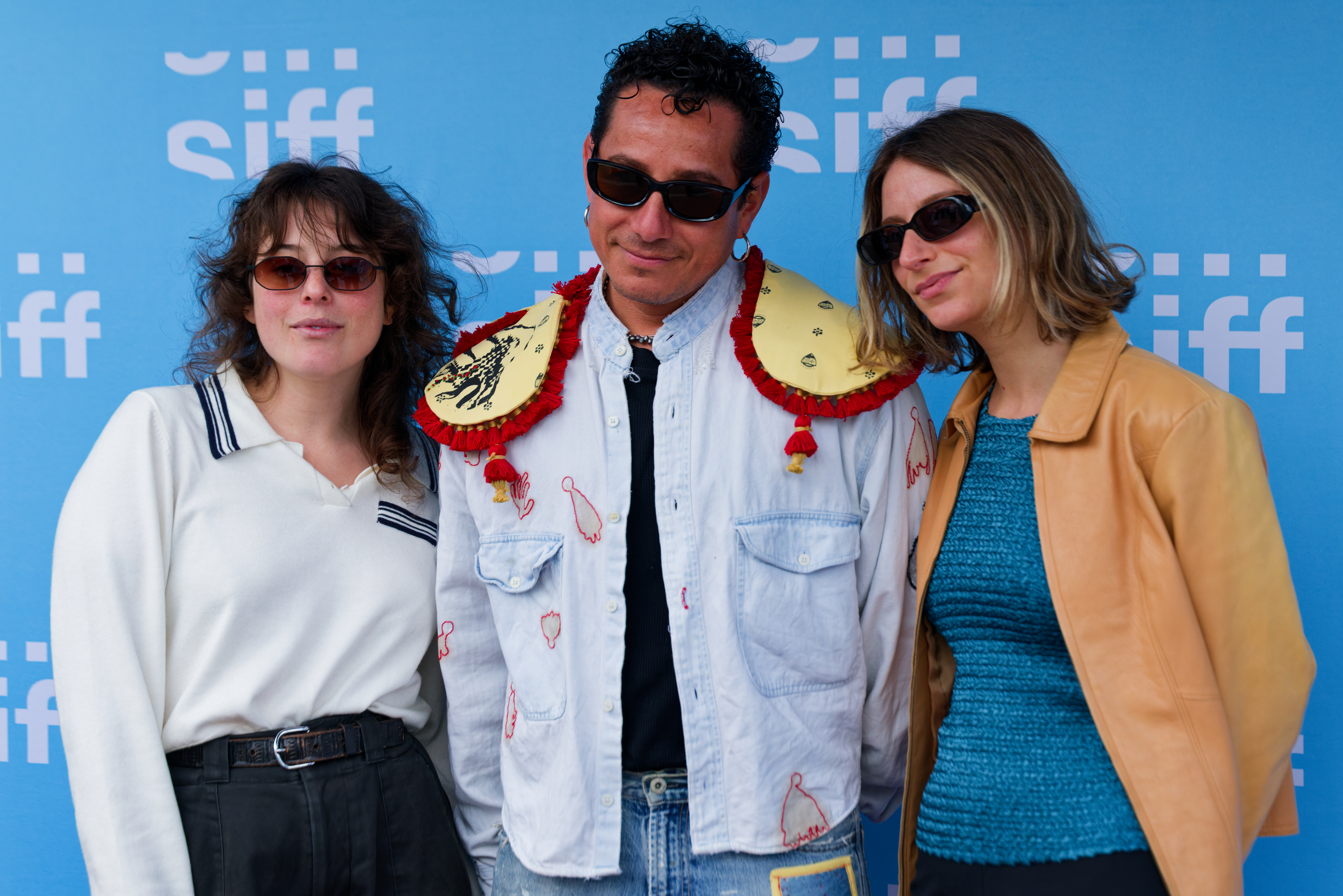
Jaripeo filmmakers Rebecca Zweig, Efraín Mojica, and Sarah Strunin

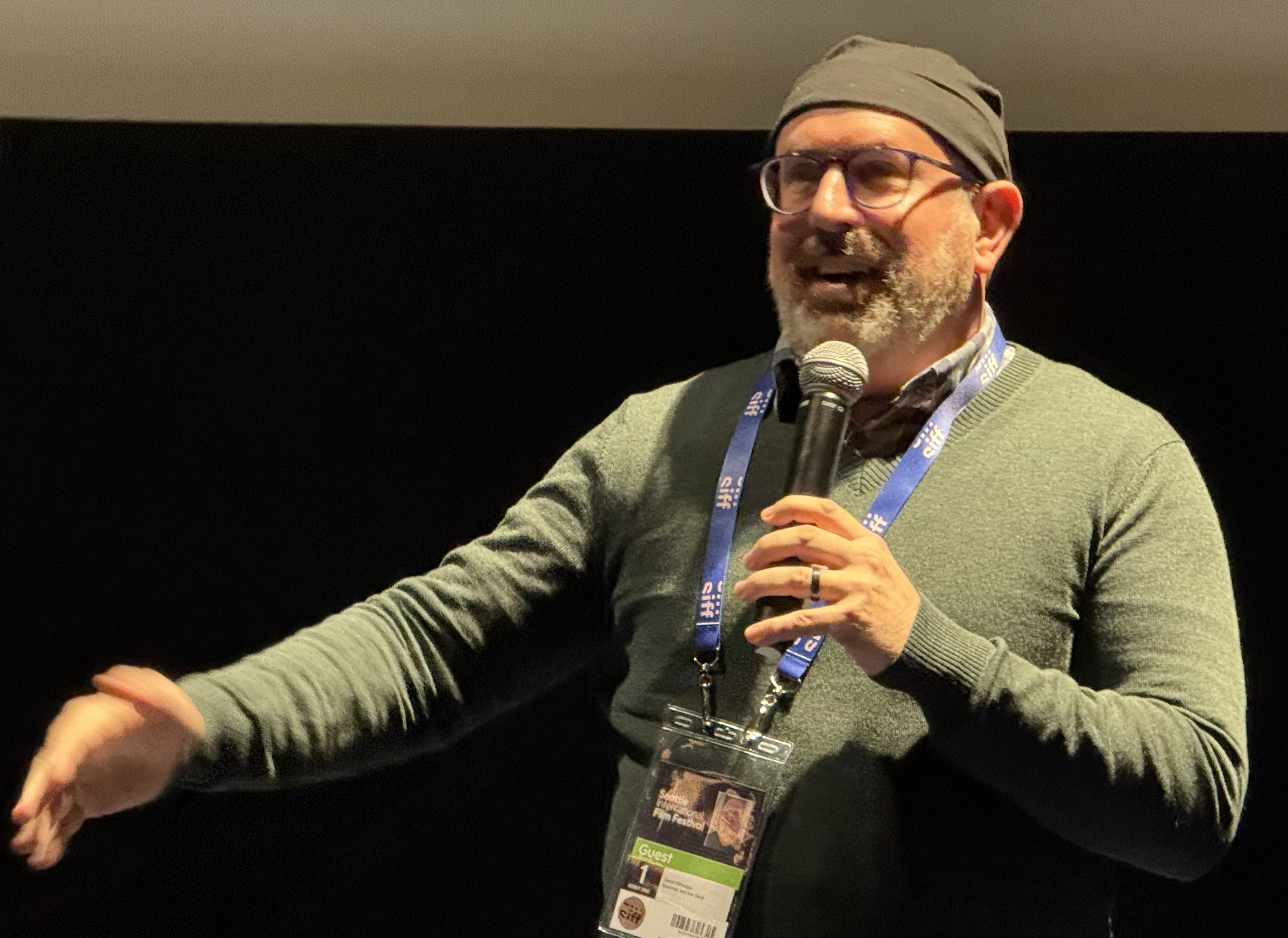
David Kittredge, director of Boorman and the Devil

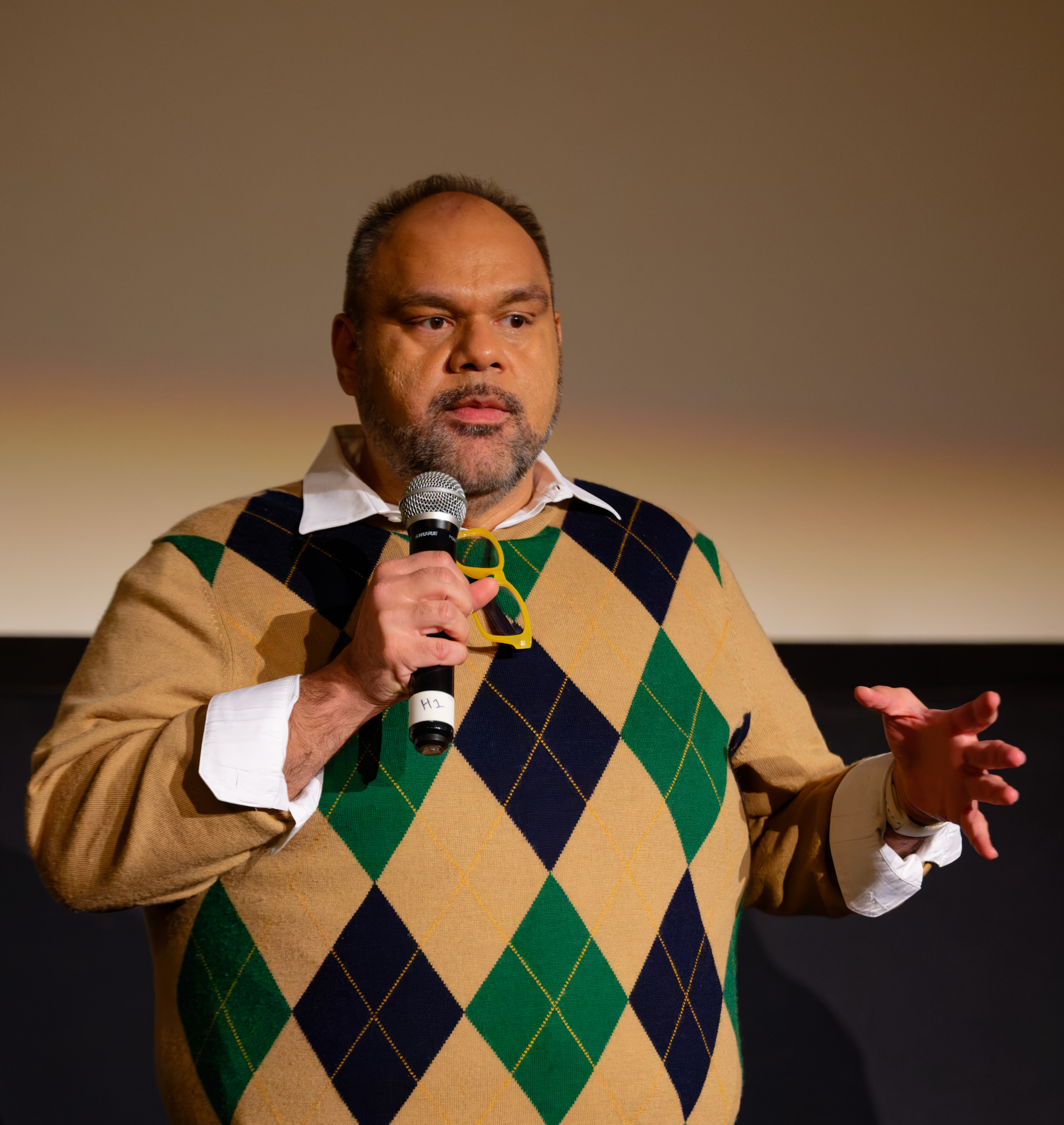
Mohammed Ali Naqvi, director of Hanging by a Wire

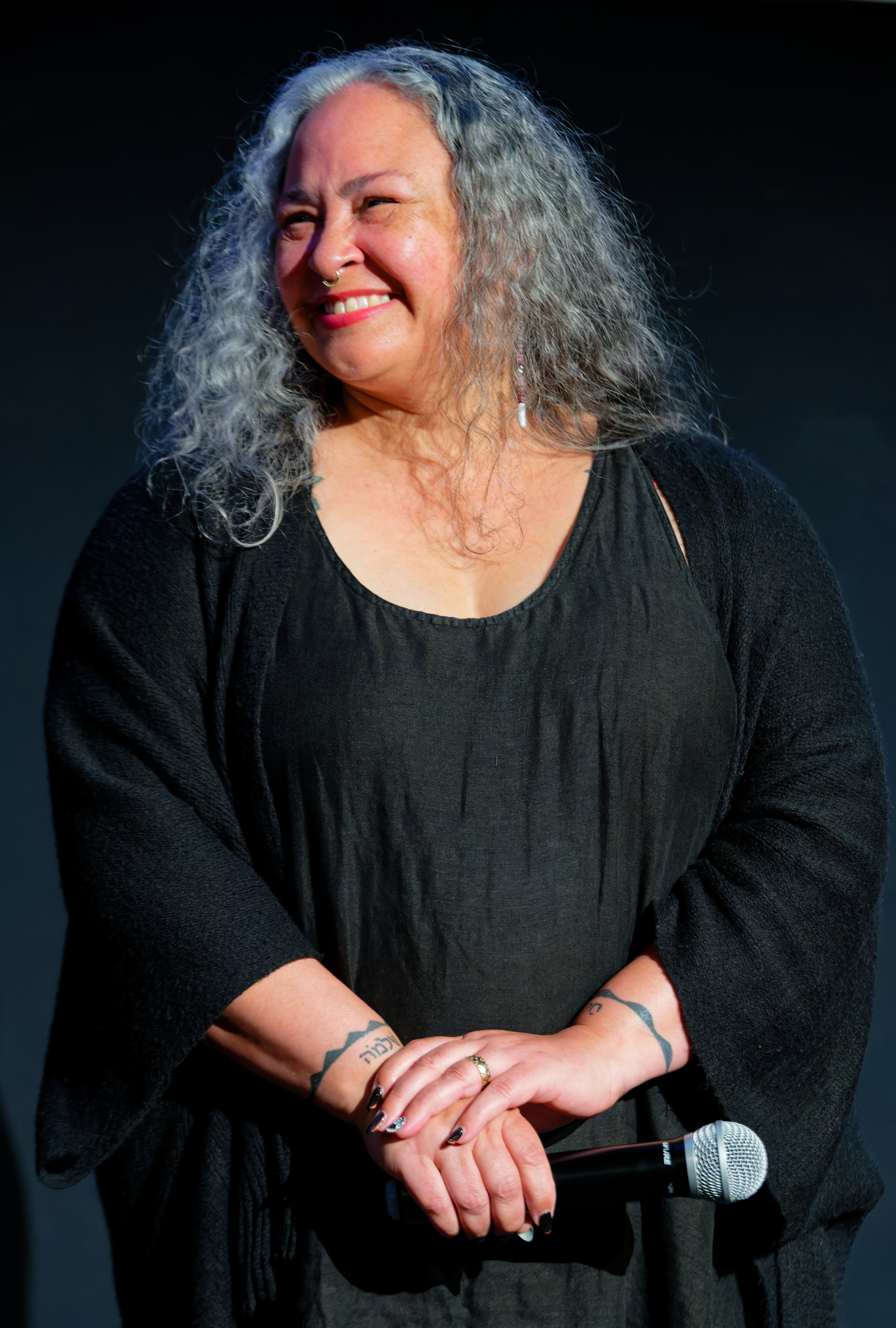
Tracy Rector, SIFF cINeDIGENOUS / shorts programmer

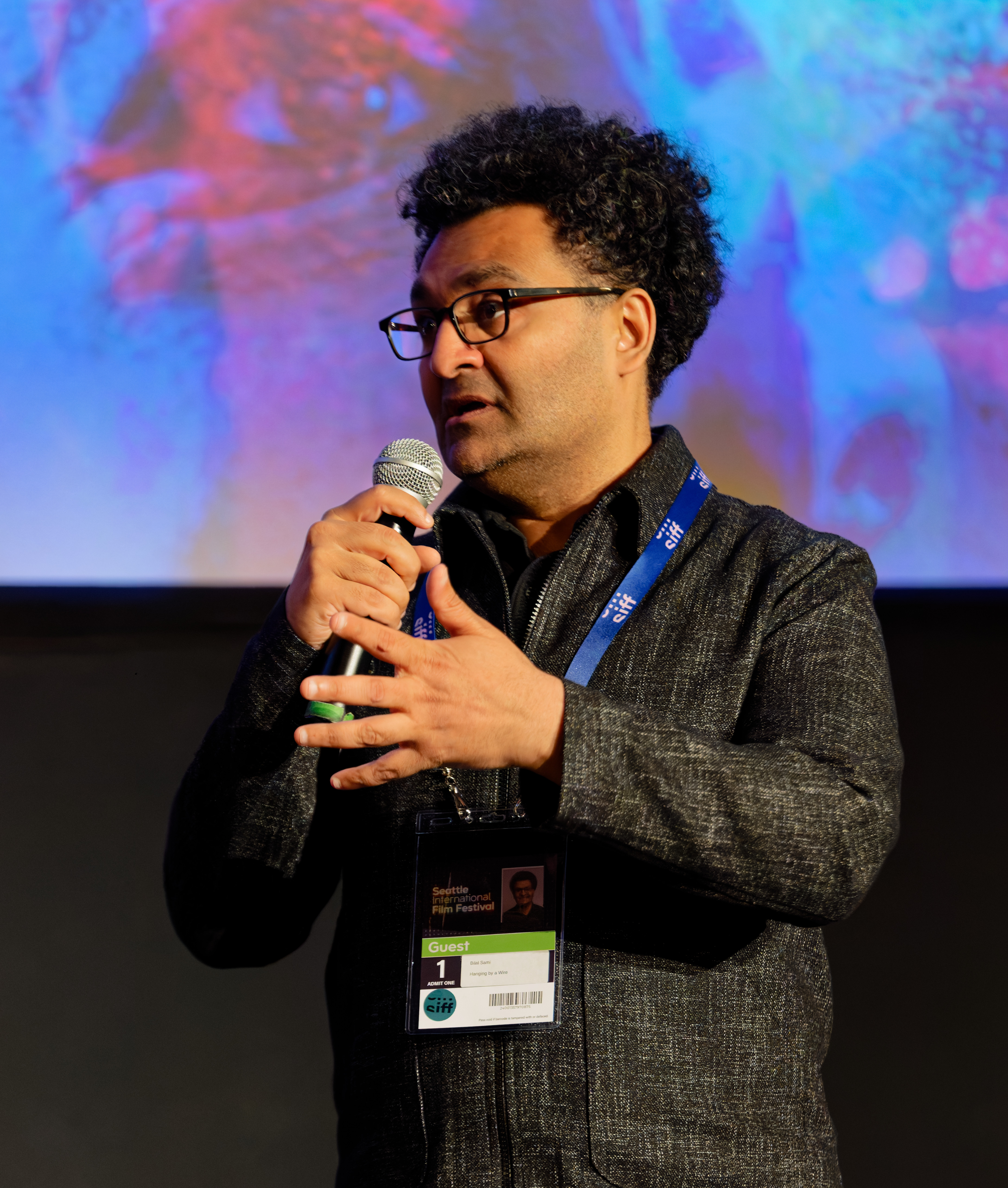
Bilal Sami, screenwriter of Hanging by a Wire

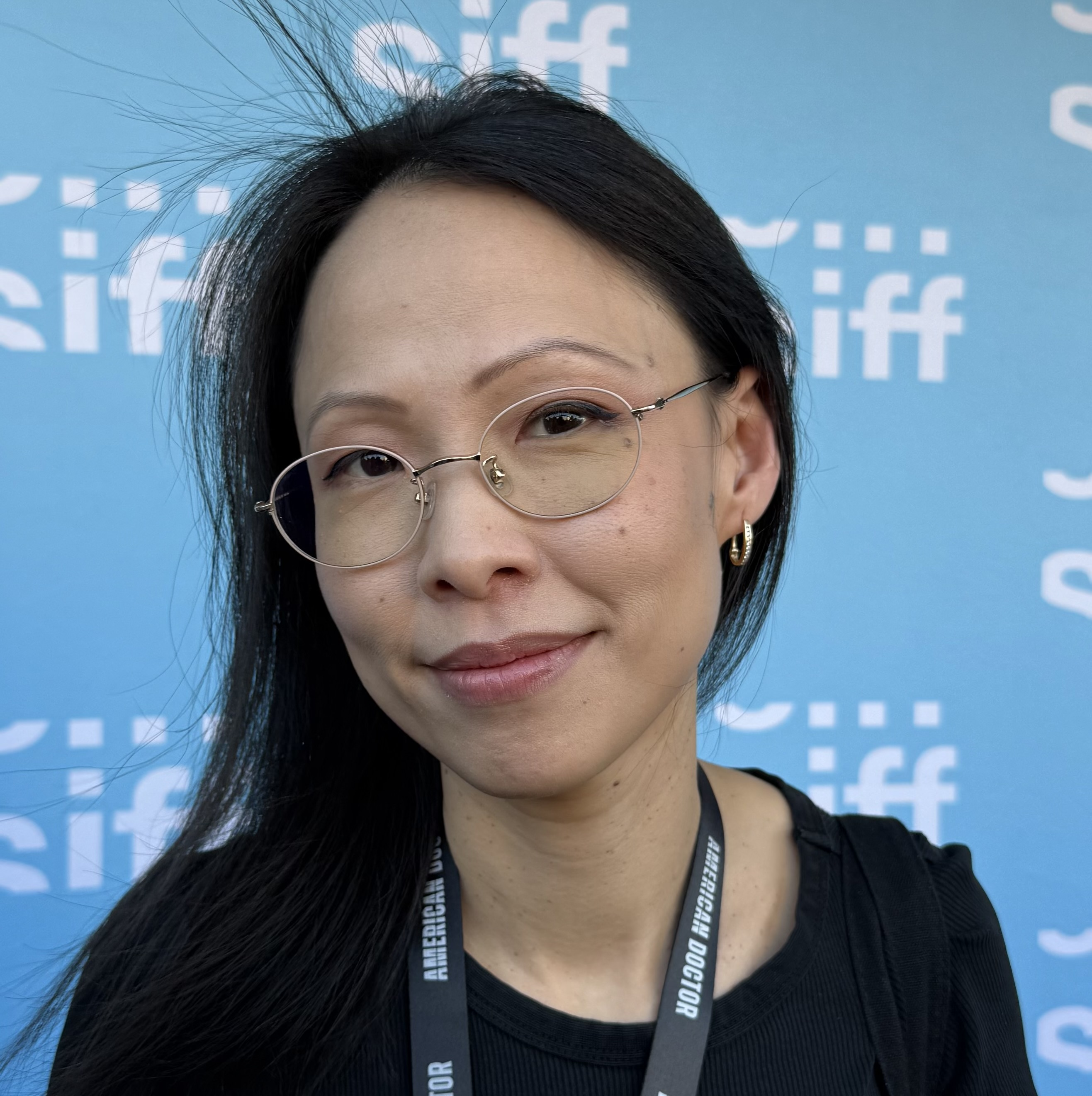
Poh Si Teng, director of American Doctor

2026 Seattle International Film Festival sugar cookies
