= Kim Levin =

American art critic and writer

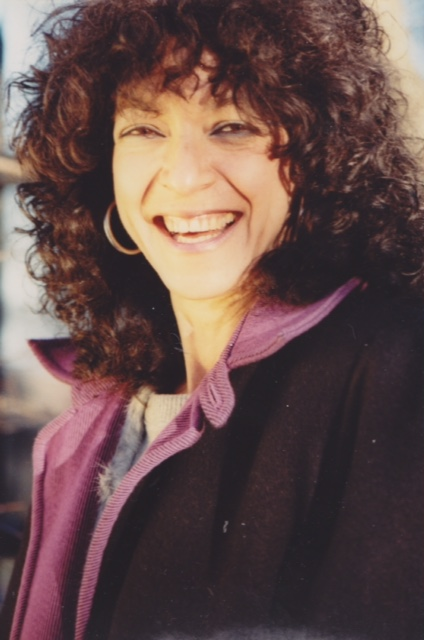
- Education: Vassar College, Columbia University, New York University
- Occupations: Art critic, Curator

Kim Levin is an American art critic and writer. Levin was a regular contributor to The Village Voice from 1982 to 2006. Since 2007 she has been contributing regularly to ARTnews.

Levin worked as a correspondent to Opus International from 1973-1977. From 1980-1994, she was a correspondent at Flash Art. She also worked as a contributing editor for Arts Magazine from 1973-1992. Levin has also contributed to the publications; Parkett, Artstudio, Sculpture and VOIR, among others. Her essays are also in books and exhibition catalogues. Kim Levin received an A.B. from Vassar College and an M.A. in Egyptian Archaeology from Columbia University, Department of Art History and Architecture. She continued Ph.D. course work at the New York University Institute of Fine Arts.

Levin has lectured in the U.S. and internationally at: the Guggenheim Museum, The New School for Social Research, Barnard College, Brown University, the São Paulo Art Biennial, the Whitney Museum of American Art, the Museum of Contemporary Art, Chicago, the California Institute of the Arts, the Cincinnati Center of Contemporary Art, and other institutions. Levin was Treasurer of AICA-USA (Association international des critiques d’art) from 1982-1984, Vice President from 1984-1990, and President from 1990-1992. She became Vice President of AICA International in 1991 and was elected President in 1996 for two terms, ending in 2002.

In 2002, an installation of Levin’s preliminary notes written on press releases and gallery announcements, appeared in the solo exhibition “Notes and Itineraries,” at Delta Axis, Memphis, curated and installed by the artist John Salvest. The show was re-conceived at Ronald Feldman Fine Arts, New York (2006), and then traveled internationally to Haas & Meyer, Zurich (2006), The Ludwig Museum, Budapest (2007), KIASMA, Helsinki (2008) and was included in the group show “Retracing Exhibitions” curated by Kari Conte and Florence Ostendat at the Royal College of Art, London (2009).

== Exhibitions curated ==
- "Arnold Mesches: A Life’s Work," retrospective including 88 paintings, collages, and drawings from 1945 to 2013. Miami-Dade Museum of Art and Design, February–May 2013.
- Printed Project, Issue 7, Summer 2007, "Unconditional Love" an exhibition in the form of a magazine.
- Commissioner, first Busan Biennale 2003 (co-curated).
- "Waterworks", Nordiska Akvarellmuseet, Skärhamn, Sweden. 2001.
- "John Salvest: Time on his Hands", Phoenix Art Museum, October 12, 1999 – January 23, 2000.
- "Max 98", Art Museum of the University of Memphis. 1998.
- "Dui Seid: Artist’s Estate" Karl Ernst Osthaus-Museum, Hagen, 1997. (Co-curated by Michael Fehr)
- "Borealis 8: The Scream", ARKEN Museum of Modern Art Copenhagen, November 16, 1996- January 17, 1997. The Nordic Biennial and The Main Exhibition of the Nordic Fine Arts Year, Copenhagen, 1996.
- Gwangju Biennale (1st), Gwangju, Korea, September- November 1995. (advisor)
- "Configura 2; Dialogue of Cultures" at Fischmarkt Galerie, Haus dem Kronbacken, and other historic sites, Erfurt, Germany, June 10 – September 10, 1995. (co-curator)
- "Drucksache: Prints and Issues," Kunstwerke, Berlin, April 26-June 27, 1993.
- "Tema: AIDS", Henie-Onstad Kunstsenter, Hovikodden, Norway, May 7 – June 20, 1993 (chief curator, co-curators Per Hovdenakk, Herloff Hatlebrekker, Sven Christiansen).
- "Translation," Center for Contemporary Art Ujazdowski Castle, Warsaw, Poland, June 26 – August 2, 1992.
- "Warhol & Basquiat: Samo & Andy", Sonje Museum of Contemporary Art, Kyongju, Korea, September 14- October 20, 1991. And National Museum of Contemporary Art, Seoul, Korea, November 1–30, 1991.
- "Contemporary American Art", Museum of Modern Art, Seibu Takanawa, Japan. September 10 – November 3, 1988.
- "Contemporary Art from New York," Ho-Am Gallery, Seoul, Korea, July 15-August 23, 1988.

== Publications ==
Kim Levin has contributed to the following publications:

=== Selected bibliography ===
- 2004. 500 års verdenskunst, “Par i rødt” (Louise Bourgeois: The Red Room) / Gylendal Nordisk Forlag, Copenhagen, (co-edited by Holger Reenberg, Torben Weirup).
- 2001. Modern Art in The USA: Issues and Controversies of the 20th Century, "Farewall to Modernism", edited by Patricia Hills, Prentice Hall. OCLC 44173077
- 2000. TransPlant: Living Vegetation in Contemporary Art. (Co-Author, Thomas von Taschitzki), Edited by Barbara Nemitz). Hatje Cantz, Germany 2000.
- 1999. Art Planet: A Global View of Art Criticism (The Journal of AICA). Initiated and Co-edited, Vol. 1., No. 0. OCLC 44762852
- 1996. Regina Silveira: Cartografias de Sombra. “Art in Absentia”, EdUSP Universidad de Sap Paulo. OCLC 36190171
- 1995. Strategies for Survival-Now! “Identity Crisis Update:The End of Modernism and the Issue of Cultural Identity, edited by Christian Chambert, The Swedish Art Critics Associated Press, Sweden. OCLC 36130555
- 1994. Sol LeWitt Testi Critici. “Il Contratto del Disegnatore”, Incontri Internazionali d'Arte Rome.OCLC 38890320
- 1990. Beyond Walls and Wars: Art, Politics, and Multiculturalism. Edited and with an introduction by Kim Levin. Midmarch Press, New York.OCLC 27552543
- 1992. Energy Plan for the Western Man: Joseph Beuys in America. Introduction by Kim Levin, edited by Karin Cuoni, Four Walls Eight Windows, New York.OCLC 21559811
- 1989. Collage: Critical Views. Foreword by Kim Levin, edited by Katherine Hoffman, U.M.I. Research Press, Ann Arbor & London.OCLC 18950056
- 1988. Beyond Modernism: Essays on Art From the 70s and 80s. Harper and Row, New York.OCLC 16900351
- 1986. An American Renaissance: Painting and Sculpture since 1940, “Appropriating the Past, Neo Expressionsim, Neo Primitivism and the Revival of Abstraction”, Abbeville Press, New York. OCLC 13003997
- 1976. New Artists Video, “Video Art in the TV Landscape”, edited by Gregory Battock, Dutton, New York.
- 1975. Super Realism, “Malcom Morley: Post Illusionism” and “The Ersatz Object”, edited by Gregory Battock, Dutton, New York. OCLC 1734086
- 1975. Lucas Samaras, (monograph) Harry N. Abrams Art Books, New York. OCLC 1091783

=== Selected museum catalogue essays ===
- Brandon Ballengee: Augures d’innocence, “Brandon Ballengee: On the Devolution of Species.” Chateau du Chamarande, Les Editions Domaine du Chamarande, MMXIV, 2013.
- Kim Jones: “The Averno Drawings,” Pierogi, Brooklyn, 2012.
- Mamma Andersson: “Under the Influence,” Moderna Museet Stockholm, Steidl. 2007.
- Leon Taracewicz, “Absolute Landscape,” Edited by Milada Slizinska, Center for Contemporary Art Ujazdowski Castle, Warsaw, 2003.
- Bettina Rheims: Retrospective, “Bettina Rheims: The Vulnerable Image” Schirmer/Mosel München. Helsinki, 2003. .
- Nedko Solakov, “Nedko Solakov: The Potential of Peripheries”, Centre for Contemporary Art Ujazdowski Castle, September 2000.
- Organizing Freedom: Nordic Art of the '90s, “Nothing Left to Lose”, Moderna Museet, Stockholm, 2000.
- Pierre et Gilles, “Pierre et Gilles; the Ecstatic Image”, a conversation between Berndt Arell and Kim Levin, Turku Art Museum, Finland, 1999-2000.
- Time Migration: Techno-Art for the New Millenium, “Future Obsolete”, Taipei Cultural Center, New York, Dec 3rd 1999.
- Irish Art Now: From the Poetic to the Political, “Poetics, Politics, and Irish Art: Thirteen Questions”, Independent Curators International in association with the Irish Museum of Modern Art, Dublin, 1999.
- Luca Buvoli, “Not-a-Superhero, I presume?,” Temporanea, Caffe’ Florian, Venice, Italy catalog text for Venice Biennale, 1997.
- Jon Kessler's Asia, “Empire of Images, Cabinet of Signs”, Kestner Gessellschaft Hanover, 1995.
- Peinture. Emblemes et References, “la Volaille de Rauschenberg”, capcMusee d'art contemporain de Bordeaux. 1993-1994.
- Allan Wexler, “Allan Wexler: Structures for Reflection”, Karl Ernst Osthaus Museum, Hagen. 1993.
- Tema AIDS: Crisis of the Body: Art in the Age of AIDS, Henie-Onstad Kunstsenter, Hovikodden, 1993
- Dark Décor, “Beyond Horror Vacuii: The Politics of Pattern”, ICI (Independent Curators Incorporated), a traveling exhibition. 1992-93.
- Counterbalance, “Art that Makes Itself: An Essay on Sol Le Witt and Jean Tinguely”, The Hans and Walter Bechtler Gallery, Charlotte, North Carolina, 1991.
- Warhol & Basquiat, “Samo & Andy”, Sonje Museum of Contemporary Art, Kyungu, Korea, 1991.
- Glass: Material in the Service of Meaning,”Transparent Contradictions”, Tacoma Art Museum, Tacoma, Washington, 1991.
- Lucas Samaras 1961-1991, Yokohama Museum of Art, October – November, 1991.
- Europe Unknown, Palac Sztuki TPSP, WKS Wawel, Cracow, Poland, 1991. (Volume 2)
- Dialogue Prague/Los Angeles, Santa Monica Museum, California, 1990.
- IRWIN, “Slovene PostModern” Cleveland State University Art Gallery, 1990.
- Art/Artifact, “Bring Em Back Alive.” The Center for African Art, New York, 1989. (2nd Edition).
- Wegman’s World, “William Wegman's Videos: Funny Instead of Formal”, Walker Art Center, Minneapolis, 1982–83.
- Dui Seid: Artist’s Estate, “Blood Relations,” Karl Ernst Osthaus-Museum, Hagen, Neuer Folkwang Verlag, Hagen, 1987.
- Rafael Ferrer, “In the Torrid Zone”, Laguna Gloria Museum, Austin, Texas, 1982.
- Pablo Picasso; Das Spatwerk 1964–1972, Kunstmuseum, Basel, 1981.
- Mac Adams Mysteries, Welsh Arts Council, Cardiff and London, 1979.
- The Angel of Mercy, La Jolla Museum of Contemporary Art, California, 1977. (Eleanor Antin)

=== Selected articles ===
- "How PoMo Can You Go?", Art News, October, 2012.
- "Talking Trash", Art News, June, 2011.
- "Where are the Great Women Pop Artists?", Art News, November, 2010.
- "Yves Klein’s Leap Year", Art News, March, 2010.
- "Nordiskt curatorsfiasko", Paletten. #270/271 Nr 4 2007 - 1 2008 (Sveriges Äldsta Konsttidskrift) (Nordic Pavilion 2007 Venice Biennale)
- "Death in Venice", Brooklyn Rail, July, 2007
- "Documenta on the Ropes", Brooklyn Rail, September 2007.
- ""He Found it at the Movies", The Village Voice, 07/07/04 (Ed Ruscha)
- Jon Kessler", The Village Voice, 5/19/04
- "Lost and Found", The Village Voice, 1/21/04 (Marc Quinn)
- "Agent Provocateur", The Village Voice, 11/26/03. (John Currin)
- "A Foreign Affair", The Village Voice, 7/29/03. ("The American Effect")
- "Power Vacuum," (50th Venice Biennale) The Village Voice, 7/9/03
- "Springtime for Hitler", The Village Voice, 3/12/02 ("Mirroring Evil: Nazi Imagery/Recent Art")
- "The CNN Documenta", (Dokumenta 11) The Village Voice, 7/9/02.
- "More is More", Hirschhorn and Sachs", The Village Voice, 11/27/02.
- "View from the Bridge: A New York Perspective on Brit Art", CVA (Contemporary Visual Art), Issue 32, London, January 2001.
- "Panic Attack," (48th Venice Biennale) The Village Voice, 7/3/01.
- "Square One", (Malevich) The Village Voice, 1/19/01.
- "Cuba Libre: Art and Contradiction at the Havana Bienal",The Village Voice, 12/19/00. (7th Havana Bienal)
- "Fuzzy Logic: Bridget Riley, The Second Time Around", The Village Voice, 10/17/00.
- "Border Crossings: Ljubljana, Lyon and Neo-Exoticism in the New Europe", The Village Voice, July 25, 2000.
- "Rebirth in Venice: 48th Venice Biennale", The Village Voice, June 22, 1999.
- "School of Paris," The Village Voice, 12/8/98 ("Premises").
- "Venetian Bind", The Village Voice, 7/18/97 (47th Venice Biennale).
- "Not the UN", The Village Voice, 7/22/97 (Dokumenta 10).
- "Control", The Village Voice, 12/10/96 (Lars von Trier’s Psykomobile #!: Verdensuret (World Clock).
- "The Bald Sopranos", The Village Voice, Sept. 9/17/96 (Eva and Adele).
- "Bark and Bite", The Village Voice 7/9/96 (Manifesta 1, Rotterdam)
- "Die Maske der Universalitat", Neue Bildende Kunst (special issue; The Marco Polo Syndrome) 4/5, 1995.
- "Artificial Respiration", (Tim Hawkinson), The Village Voice, 10/31/95
- "Honest Fictions: Nedko Solakov", BE #3, Kunstlerhaus Bethanien, Oct., 1995.
- "Artificial Respiration", The Village Voice, Sept. 10/31/95. (Tim Hawkinson).
- "Venetian Balls", The Village Voice, 7/4/95 (46th Venice Biennale).
- "Lettre de New York", VOIR, Feb. 1995.
- "Krise Identity Dnes: Konec Moderismu a Problem Kulturni Identity", Vytvarne Umeni, Prague, Jan/Feb 1995.
- "Trans-Europe Express", The Village Voice, 11/27/94.
- "Achilles’ Heel", World Art, November, 1993. (45th Venice Biennale).
- "Laurie Parsons/Rirkrit Tiravanija", Kunstforum, Jan/Feb, 1994.
- "Seoul Searching", The Village Voice, 11/02/93.
- "Horn's Dilemma", The Village Voice, 08/10/93.
- "The Masterpiece Mentality", The Village Voice, 06/01/93. (American Art in the 20th Century, Martin-Gropius Bau).
- "Billet d'humeur: Grunge", VOIR, May, 1993.
- "Dossier: Warsaw", Sculpture, March/April, 1993.
- "Sewing and Cooking," The Village Voice, 02/09/93 (Charles LeDray and Paul McCarthy).
- "Typography is Not Destiny", The Village Voice, 2/23/93 (Lothar Baumgarten)
- "Heal Thyself," (Damien Hirst/Salon du Fleurus) The Village Voice, 1/19/93.
- "Dossier: Seoul", Sculpture, December, 1992.
- "Significant Others in Istanbul", The Village Voice, 12/01/92.
- "Jan Who? Docu What?" The Village Voice, 07/14/92.
- "Editorial: Crise d'Identite", VOIR, May, 1992.
- "The Negligent Aesthetic", Artscribe, September, 1991.
- "Slouching Toward the Millennium", The Village Voice, 3/19/91.
- "Intolerance, or The Power of Images" New Art International, February, 1991.
- "Eastern Exposure", The Village Voice, 10/09/90.
- "Letter from New York: Life, Death, and Gesamtkitschwerke", VOIR, Nov-Dec., 1990.
- "Haim Steinbach: signes de progress/ object contradictories", Artstudio 19, Winter, 1990.
- "Cumulus From America (New Art in the Second World)", Parkett, No. 25, September, 1990.
- "Belief is Dangerous", The Village Voice, 04/08/90 (Richter’s Baader Meinhoff series).
- "Studio Visits: Robert Longo", Mirabella, October, 1989.
- "Ono: In Permanent Flux", Connoissuer, March 1989.
- "Blank Czech: Our Critic in Prague," The Village Voice, 9/19/89
- "Avant-Slav", The Village Voice, 06/26/89
- "The Man Who Flew into Space", The Village Voice, 5/31/88 (Ilya Kabakov)
- "The Agony and the Anomie", Arts Magazine, April, 1986.
- "Chuck Close, Eric Fischl, Leon Golub", Art of Our Time: Saatchi Collection, Vol. IV, 1984.
- "The Robert Smithson No One Ever Noticed", Art News. Sept. 1982.
- "Arshile Gorky at The Guggenheim Museum." Flash Art. Oct/Nov. 1981.
- "The Monumental Show", Arts Magazine, Sept. 1981.
- "The State of the Art; 1980", Art Journal, Fall/Winter 1980.
- "The Times Square Show", Arts Magazine, Sept. 1980.
- "Marcel Broodthaers and the Insincere Object", Arts Magazine, April 1980.
- "Joseph Beuys: The New Order", Arts Magazine, April 1980.
- "Andy Warhol at The Whitney Museum, Flash Art, April 1980.
- "Sofa-sized Paintings", The Village Voice, 12/10/79.
- "Farewell to Modernism", Arts Magazine, Oct. 1979.
- "Dennis Oppenheim: Post Performance Works", Arts Magazine, Sept. 1979.
- "Chuck Close: Decoding the Image", Arts Magazine, June 1978.
- "Reflections on Robert Smithson's Spiral Jetty", Arts Magazine, May 1978.
- "Mac Adams: Circumstantial Evidence", Arts Magazine, April 1978.
- "New Grounds for Art: Helen and Newton Harrison", Arts Magazine, Feb. 1978.
- "Narrative Landscape on the Continental Shelf: Notes on Southern California", Arts Magazine, Oct. 1976.
- "Fifties Fallout: The Hydrogen Jukebox", Arts Magazine, April 1974.
- "Duchamp in New York", Opus International, June 1973.
- "Bruce Nauman: Stretching the Truth", Opus International, Sept. 1973.
- "Open Season on Style", Opus International, June 1973.
- "The Newest Realism: A Synthetic Slice of Life", Opus International, June 1973.
- "Eva Hesse: Notes on New Beginnings", Arts Magazine, Feb. 1973.
- "Eros, Samaras and Recent Art", Arts Magazine, Dec/Jan. 1973.
- "Rafael Ferrer: A Different Drummer", Art News, Dec. 1971

== Awards and honors ==
- Fellow, USC Annenberg-Getty Journalism Program, November 2011.
- Fellow, USC Annenberg-Getty Arts Fellowship Program, 2004.
- Juror, UNESCO Prize for the Advancement of Art in Cooperation with AICA, Cairo Biennale, 1998.
- Chair of Jury, UNESCO Prize for the Advancement of Art, Paris, 1995.
- SECA Fellowship, San Francisco Museum of Modern Art, 1993.
- First Place, Contemporary Art, Fifth Annual Manufacturers Hanover Art/World Award for Distinguished Newspaper Art Criticism, 1986.
- Visual Arts Panelist for Critic Grants, National Endowment for the Arts, 1981.

== Exhibitions ==
- Ronald Feldman Fine Arts]. January 7-February 4, 2006.
- The New York Times, January 18, 2006
- Kim Levin. The New Yorker. February 6, 2006.
- “Remembering Exhibitions” Royal College of Art, London, March 2009.
