= Hanging by a Wire =

2026 film by Mohammed Ali Naqvi

- British promotional poster
- Urdu: ہینگنگ بائی اے وائر
- Directed by: Mohammed Ali Naqvi
- Written by: Mohammed Ali Naqvi; Bilal Sami
- Produced by: Mohammed Ali Naqvi; Bilal Sami
- Cinematography: Brendan McGinty
- Edited by: William Grayburn
- Music by: Sven Faulconer
- Production companies: Universal Pictures; EverWonder Studio; Mindhouse Productions; 64th Street Media
- Distributed by: Abramorama (United States); Dogwoof (United Kingdom)
- Release date: 22 January 2026 (Sundance)
- Running time: 98 minutes
- Countries: United Kingdom; Pakistan; United States
- Languages: English; Urdu; Pashtu

Hanging by a Wire (Urdu: ہینگنگ بائی اے وائر) is a 2026 documentary film directed by Mohammed Ali Naqvi, co-written with Bilal Sami. A co-production of the United Kingdom, Pakistan, and the United States, it details the August 2023 rescue in Pakistan of eight passengers of a cable car that was dangling 900 feet above a ravine after two of its three cables snapped.

The film had its world premiere at the 2026 Sundance Film Festival on 22 January. It was also selected as the Pakistani entry for the Best International Feature Film at the 99th Academy Awards, marking the first documentary selected to represent the country in the category.

== Release ==
Hanging by a Wire premiered in World Cinema Documentary Competition at the 2026 Sundance Film Festival on 22 January. It was screened on 10 May 2026, at the 2026 Seattle International Film Festival in Documentary features.

The film was also part of the 73rd Sydney Film Festival International Documentaries, where it was screened on 6 June 2026.

The film was released on VOD and digital platforms on 13 October 2026, followed by its SVOD debut on Paramount+ on 28 October 2026.

== Reception ==
=== Critical response ===
On the review aggregator website Rotten Tomatoes, 87% of 23 critics' reviews are positive, with an average rating of 7.2/10. Metacritic, which uses a weighted average, assigned the film a score of 66 out of 100, based on 10 critics, indicating "generally favorable" reviews.

The Hollywood Reporter critic Richard Lawson gave the film a mixed review, praising the "stitching together of actual footage from the ordeal, both the fuzzy faraway phone videos and the stomach-plunging drone shots capturing these young men in staggering close-up," which he said "heightens the surreality and loneliness of their experience." However, he criticized the film as "a gripping story not told thoroughly enough," noting that it "craves proper context" and that the lack of testimony from the boys themselves "robs us of a no-doubt grueling and compelling hour-by-hour retelling of what it was to teeter on the brink of death for so long."

IndieWire described the film as "taut but frustratingly anemic," stating that director Naqvi is "too afraid of losing your attention to make the most of the moments when it has them." The review noted that the film "takes a few measured steps toward" addressing the class dynamics of the rescue, but that its "narrow focus" does more to "flatten the people involved than it does to bring new dimension to their ordeal."

The Guardian praised the film as a "tense, skilfully assembled survival story with unexpected flashes of comedy," crediting director Naqvi for "pulling it all together adeptly" and editor William Grayburn for "seamless editing that nourishes the suspense." The review noted the film's drone shots "will give anyone with acrophobia the heebie jeebies," but observed that the film does not investigate the safety failures that allowed the incident to happen, instead treating the event as "bad luck."

The Playlist gave the film a highly positive review, calling it a "nail-biting watch" that "never allows itself to become bogged down in excessive setup or backstory." The reviewer wrote that "with both rescuers operating under nothing but the best of intentions, the head of police reveals that hiring a zipline company had something to do with money, offering an unusual class perspective," and concluded that the film is "a story akin to the infamous Copiapó mining accident, with this a brief moment in time when the world collectively worried."

The Film Stage critic John Fink wrote that the film "is not without thrills and human drama," but that it "seems focused more on a death-defying rescue than on what could be done to prevent this from happening again."

Morning Star described the film as "conventional in form and technique" but noted that it "reflects the tension of the situation perfectly: terrified people hanging from a wire, an anguished community and a series of chaotically heroic rescue attempts." The review praised the film's "moments of surprising humour" and the contrast it draws between "the bourgeoise bodybuilder's state-of-the-art pulleys and the improvised contraption of his poorer 'rival,'" concluding that it is "a gripping and unexpectedly life-affirming documentary."

=== Accolades ===
Award / Film Festival	Year	Category	Recipient(s)	Result	Ref.
Sundance Film Festival	26 January 2026	Grand Jury Prize - World Cinema Documentary	Hanging by a Wire	Nominated	
Mosaic International South Asian Film Festival (MISAFF)	4 October 2026	Sabeen Mahmud Award for Courage in Cinema	Hanging by a Wire	Won	

== See also ==
- List of submissions to the 99th Academy Awards for Best International Feature Film
- List of Pakistani submissions for the Academy Award for Best International Feature Film
