= Mierle Laderman Ukeles =

American artist (born 1939)

- Born: 1939; Denver, Colorado
- Notable work: Maintenance Art Manifesto 1969! Proposal for an Exhibition "CARE" (1969); Maintenance Art Tasks (1973); Hartford Wash: Washing/Tracks/Maintenance: Outside (1973); Hartford Wash: Washing/Tracks/Maintenance: Inside (1973); Touch Sanitation (1978-80)
- Movement: Feminist art movement Conceptual Art
- Spouse: Jacob Ukeles
- Awards: Francis J. Greenburger Award, Art Omi, 2019, Public Art Dialogue Award, Anonymous Was A Woman Award

Mierle Laderman Ukeles (born 1939) is a New York City-based artist known for her feminist and service-oriented artworks, which relate the idea of process in conceptual art to domestic and civic "maintenance". Since 1977, she has been the Artist in Residence (unsalaried) of the New York City Department of Sanitation.

== Personal life and education ==
Born in Denver, Colorado, Ukeles is Jewish and the daughter of a rabbi. As an undergraduate, Ukeles studied history and international studies at Barnard College and later began her artistic training at the Pratt Institute in New York in 1962. Her time at the Pratt Institute came with controversy, as her artworks (bulbous-like sculptures at the time) were deemed "over-sexed". While one of her teachers, Robert Richenburg, resigned in protest, she left the school shortly after. She then enrolled in art education at the University of Denver. She married in 1966. Two years later she had her first of three children. Ukeles earned a Master's degree from New York University in 1974 in Inter-related Arts.

== Career ==
In 1969, Ukeles wrote a manifesto entitled Maintenance Art Manifesto 1969! Proposal for an exhibition "CARE", as she pondered her position as an artist and mother. Her claim was to challenge the domestic role of women by reframing herself as a "maintenance artist". Maintenance, for Ukeles, includes the household activities that keep things going, such as cooking, cleaning and child-rearing. Aside from "personal" or household maintenance, the manifesto also addressed "general" or public maintenance (cleaning a building, or a street) and earth maintenance, such as addressing polluted waters. Her exhibitions and performances were intended to bring awareness to the low social status of maintenance work, generally paying either minimum wage or no payments for housewives and workers. During her exhibitions, she performed the same tasks that she would perform in her daily life, including entertaining guests or partaking in a Mikveh.

Several of her performances in the 1970s involved the maintenance of art spaces, including the Wadsworth Atheneum in Hartford. At the Wadsworth Atheneum, Ukeles cleaned the steps of the museum's entrance, as part of the 1973 all-female exhibition c.7500, curated by Lucy Lippard.

Since 1977, she has been the Artist in Residence (unsalaried) of the New York City Department of Sanitation. She is the only artist to ever hold that position. In 2019, she received the Francis J. Greenburger Award for artists whom the art world knows to be of extraordinary merit but who have not been fully recognized by the public.

In 1989, Ukeles was commissioned by the Fresh Kills Landfill in Staten Island, to work on the reclamation project to transform the 2200-acre, largest manmade site, to a recreational park known as Freshkills Park. Ukeles invited New Yorkers from all five boroughs to contribute palm-sized artworks made of trash.

In 2020, Mierle Laderman Ukeles unveiled a new artwork entitled For ⟶ forever.... The work, a 15-second video piece, was put on display on Time Square billboards, the Queens Museum's facade, and on New York's subway screens and showed:

Dear Service Worker,
"Thank you for keeping NYC alive!"
For ⟶ forever...

Mierle Laderman Ukeles’ works redefined the scope of contemporary art by focusing on the often invisible labor that sustains society, creating a dialogue between art and everyday work. Her Maintenance Art project, initiated in the 1970s, was groundbreaking in its exploration of domestic labor, which she elevated to the level of fine art through conceptual and performance-based works. Ukeles' involvement with the New York City Department of sanitation as the first artist-in-residence in 1977 set a precedent for artists, integrating community engagement and institutional collaboration into their practice.

In 2025 a documentary directed by Toby Perl Freilich was published, following the life of Ukeles, titled Maintenance Artist.

== Concepts and methodologies ==
The role of the artist for Ukeles is that of an activist: empowering people to act and change societal values and norms. This agenda stems from a feminist concern with challenging the privileged and gendered notion of the independent artist. For Ukeles, art is not fixed and complete but an ongoing process that is connected to everyday life and her Manifesto for Maintenance Art proclaims the infection of art by everyday mundane activities. The gargantuan domestic actions that she performed primarily became inaugurated out of her role as artist and mother in the 70s. After the birth of her first child in 1968, Ukeles believes that her public identity as an artist slipped into second place, because of the public perception of the role of a mother.

=== Manifesto For Maintenance Art 1969! ===
Initially written as a proposal for an exhibition entitled Care, the Manifesto For Maintenance Art emphasizes maintenance—keeping things clean, working and cared for—as a creative strategy. The manifesto came about after Ukeles gave birth to her first child. Suddenly she had to balance her time as an artist and mother, and had little time to create art. She noted that the famous male artists that she admired never had to make such sacrifices. She has described this feeling and the epiphany that lead to the manifesto in this way, "I felt like two separate people...the free artists and the mother/maintenance worker...I was never working so hard in my whole life, trying to keep together the two people I had become. Yet people said to me, when they saw me pushing my baby carriage, "Do you do anything?"...Then I had an epiphany... I have the freedom to name maintenance as art. I can collide freedom into its supposed opposite and call that art. I name necessity art."

The manifesto is formed into two major parts. In part I, under the rubric 'Ideas' she makes a distinction between the two basic systems of 'Development' and 'Maintenance', where the former is associated with 'pure individual creation', 'the new', 'change' and the latter is tasked with 'keep the dust off the pure individual creation, preserve the new, sustain the change'. She asks, "after the revolution, who’s going to pick up the garbage on Monday morning?". This contrasts with the modernist tradition in which the originality of an artist is foregrounded and the mundane material reality of an artist's everyday life is disregarded.

The second part describes her proposal for the exhibition and is made up of three parts A) Part One: Personal, B) Part Two: General and C) Part Three: Earth Maintenance. She begins with the statement “I am an artist. I am a woman. I am a wife. I am a mother. (Random order) I do a hell of a lot of washing, cleaning, cooking, renewing, supporting, preserving, etc. Also, (up to now separately) I ‘do’ Art. Now I will simply do these everyday things, and flush them up to consciousness, exhibit them, as Art [...] MY WORKING WILL BE THE WORK”

=== Touch Sanitation (1979-80) ===
In her work Touch Sanitation, taking almost a year, Ukeles met over 8500 employees of the New York Sanitation Department, shaking hands with each of them and saying, “Thank you for keeping New York City alive”. She documented her activities on a map, recording her conversations with the workers. Ukeles documented the workers' private stories in an attempt to change some of the negative words used about them.

=== Public Space ===
A common theme in Ukeles' exhibitions and site-specific works is the involvement of the public, and the idea that "a space becomes truly public when a sense of public ownership is felt by many individuals [...]". Turnaround/Surround (1990-2004) in Danehy Park, Cambridge, USA, a former landfill-turned competitive sports park, is an example of this concept in her work. Her interest stemmed from the site itself being reclaimed by the community, and she invited people from different language groups to provide objects of value that "represent where they came from originally before they came to the United States". These objects were then embedded into the hill in Danehy Park to give value to a site that formerly held no value.

== Honors and awards ==
Laderman Ukeles was given honorary doctorates from: School of the Art Institute of Chicago, Chicago, IL, Rhode Island School of Design, Providence, RI, and Maine College of Art, Portland, ME.

She has been awarded several prestigious awards and fellowships including:

- Francis J. Greenburger Award, Art Omi, 2019, Charlotta Kotik, Presenter
- Public Art Dialogue Award, College Art Association, 2017
- Lily Auchincloss Foundation, 2015
- The Shelley & Donald Rubin Foundation, 2015.
- Queens Museum Honoree, 2015.
- Ann Chamberlain Distinguished Fellow, San Francisco Art Institute, 2010.
- Jewish Cultural Achievement Awards, National Foundation for Jewish Culture, 2003.
- Anonymous was a Woman Foundation Award, 2001.

== Works ==
- Manifesto For Maintenance Art 1969! Proposal for an Exhibition "CARE" (1969) - a proposal for an exhibition to display maintenance work as contemporary art, which was published in Artforum in 1971. Ukeles then participated in Lucy Lippard's traveling exhibition of conceptual female artists c. 7,500 (1973–74) and fourteen other exhibitions and interventions in museums followed, including in the Wadsworth Atheneum.
- Maintenance Art Tasks (1973) - a photograph collection of household activities performed by Laderman Ukeles and her husband, with 12 to 90 images per activity.
- Maintenance Art Tasks performances at the Wadsworth Atheneum, 1973 - During the course of 1973, Laderman performed The Keeping of the Keys (July 20, 1973), Transfer: The Maintenance of the Art Object: Mummy Maintenance: With the Maintenance Man, The Maintenance Artist, and the Museum Conservator (July 20, 1973), Washing/Tracks/Maintenance: Inside and Washing/Tracks/Maintenance: Outside (July 23, 1973) at the Wadsworth Atheneum
- Hartford Wash: Washing/Tracks/Maintenance: Outside (1973)
- Hartford Wash: Washing/Tracks/Maintenance: Inside (1973)
- Touch Sanitation (1978–80)
- Transfer Station / Transformation from Touch Sanitation (1984). Multi-media installations at Ronald Feldman Gallery and Marine Transfer Station, 59th and Hudson/NYC Department of Sanitation.
- Re-Entry (1987). Prototype for Flow City. 20 tons of recyclables, 12' x 90' x 18', Passage ramp at PS. 1, New York City, with NYC Department of Sanitation.
- Landfill Cross Section (in a marble staircase) (1990). Layers of clays, soils, geosynthetic materials, methane venting system. With NYC Department of Sanitation "Garbage Out Front: A New Era of Public Design," Municipal Art Society, NYC, Summer 1990.
- Pit / Egg: A New Low for Holland (1992). Landfill lining sculpture, 80' x 40' x 30' with three barge rafts, 4' x 15' x 3' in Zoetermeer, Holland.
- The Work Ballets, seven ballets for large-machinery that took place intermittently between 1983 and 2013 in Rotterdam, New York City, Givors, Pittsburgh and Echigo-Tsumari. They are the subject of Ukeles' first monograph published by Sternberg Press in 2015 and edited by Kari Conte.
- Turnaround Surround, "Glassphalt" path in Danehy Park in North Cambridge, Massachusetts. Park is built on site of a dump and landfill closed in 1972. (1997-2002)

== Publications ==
Author

- "Manifesto For Maintenance Art 1969! Proposal for an exhibition 'Care'."; Originally published in Jack Burnham. "Problems of Criticism." Artforum (January 1971) 41; reprinted in Lucy Lippard. Six Years: The Dematerialization of the Art Object. New York:New York University Press, 1979: 220-221.
- "Maintenance Art Activity (1973)." Documents 10 (Fall 1977):8.
- "Sanitation Manifesto! (1984)." The Act 2, no.1, (1990): 84-85.
- "A Journey: Earth/City/Flow." Art Journal (Summer 1992): 12-14.
- "Maintenance Art," in Conservation and Maintenance of Contemporary Public Art, ed. Hafthor Yngvason (London: Archetype Publications, 2002), 9-14.

Coauthor

- Ukeles, Mierle Laderman and Alexandra Schwartz. "Mierle Laderman Ukeles in conversation with Alexandra Schwartz." in Butler, Cornelia et al.From Conceptualism to Feminism: Lucy Lippard's Numbers Shows 1969-1974 London: Afterall, 2012.
