= The Big Cheese (film) =

2025 documentary film

- Film poster
- Directed by: Sara Joe Wolansky
- Produced by: James A. Smith; Sara Joe Wolansky
- Cinematography: Gareth Smit
- Edited by: Nick Weiss-Richmond
- Music by: Jacques Brautbar
- Release date: November 13, 2025 (DOC NYC)
- Country: United States
- Languages: English; French; Japanese

The Big Cheese is a 2025 American documentary film which follows a team of American cheesemongers as they compete for first place in France's Mondial du Fromage cheese competition. It is produced and directed by Sara Joe Wolansky. It premiered at DOC NYC on November 13, 2025.

== Reception ==
Jason Delgado of Film Threat gave the film a score of 8.5 out of 10, writing, "The Big Cheese is more thrilling and intense than you would expect a movie about cheese to be, and like any good documentary, that's thanks to the director Wolansky and the subjects (such as a woman named Kyra, who thinks she may be the first black cheese monger from the States)."
