= Edie Arnold Is a Loser =

- Directed by: Megan Rico; Kade Atwood
- Written by: Megan Rico
- Produced by: Bryson Alejandro
- Starring: Adi Madden Cabrera; McKenna Tuckett; Cherish Rodriguez; Niki Rahimi; Alexa Paige; Luseane Pasa; Star Herrmann; Alana Mei Kern; Gabe Root; Lucas Van Orden
- Cinematography: Brenna Empey
- Edited by: Steven Rico
- Music by: Nikolas Balseiro; Anand Wilder
- Production company: Infigo Films
- Release date: March 13, 2026 (SXSW)
- Running time: 73 minutes
- Country: United States
- Language: English
- Budget: $196,500

Edie Arnold is a Loser is an American independent musical comedy film directed by Megan Rico and Kade Atwood. The film is a coming-of-age comedy about Edie Arnold (Adi Madden Cabrera), a timid outcast girl at a Roman Catholic school whose image is transformed when she and her best friend Frances (McKenna Tuckett) start a punk rock band.

The film premiered at the 2026 South by Southwest Film & TV Festival on March 13, 2026.

== Cast ==
- Adi Madden Cabrera as Edie Arnold
- McKenna Tuckett as Frances
- Cherish Rodriguez as Luanne Arnold
- Niki Rahimi as Judith
- Alexa Paige as Ellen
- Luseane Pasa as Sister Sheena
- Star Herrmann as Sister Myra
- Alana Mei Kern as Kati Vidal
- Gabe Root as Iggy
- Lucas Van Orden as Walter Boyd

== Production ==
Principal photography took place from September 2024 to April 2025, in Salt Lake City, for a musical comedy film directed by Megan Rico and Kade Atwood, and starring Adi Madden Cabrera, McKenna Tuckett, Cherish Rodriguez, Niki Rahimi, Alexa Paige, Luseane Pasa, Star Herrmann, Alana Mei Kern, Gabe Root, and Lucas Van Orden.

== Release ==
Edie Arnold is a Loser had its world premiere at the 2026 South by Southwest Film & TV Festival on March 13, 2026.

It was subsequently screened at the 2026 Seattle International Film Festival, where it won the Golden Space Needle Award for Best Film.

== Reception ==
On the review aggregator website Rotten Tomatoes, 100% of 11 critics' reviews are positive.
