= Yoriko Mizushiri =

Japanese animator

Yoriko Mizushiri (水尻自子, Mizushiri Yoriko, born 1984) is a Japanese animator and filmmaker based in Tokyo. Born in Towada, Aomori Prefecture, Japan, she is best known for a trilogy of short films exploring the sense of touch — Futon (2012), Kamakura (2013) and Maku (2014) — and for Ordinary Life (2025), which won the Silver Bear Jury Prize at the 75th Berlin International Film Festival.

== Biography ==
Mizushiri was born in 1984 in Towada, Aomori Prefecture. She graduated from Joshibi University of Art and Design, first completing the design course in the junior college division, and then graduating from the design department of the art faculty. She later worked as a teaching assistant at the university before establishing herself as an independent animator. She is an associate professor in the Design Course of the Formative Arts Department at the Joshibi University of Art and Design Junior College Division.

She made her directorial debut in 2009 with Reina Reina, which was broadcast on Tokyo MX. In 2012, she released Futon, the first installment of a trilogy of short films exploring the sense of touch, continued with Kamakura (2013) and Maku (2014). Futon won the Newcomer's Award in the Animation Division at the 16th Japan Media Arts Festival, the Grand Prix at the 2014 Brussels International Animation Film Festival, and a special mention from a Grand Competition jury member at Animafest Zagreb 2014.

Kamakura and Maku were both selected for the short film competition at the Berlin International Film Festival, in 2014 and 2015 respectively. In 2021, her short film Anxious Body premiered in the Directors' Fortnight section at the 74th Cannes Film Festival and received an Animation Division Jury Selection at the 25th Japan Media Arts Festival. The film was commissioned for a 2022 exhibition at the Towada Art Center in her hometown.

In 2025, her film Ordinary Life won the Silver Bear Jury Prize in the short film competition at the 75th Berlin International Film Festival. The film also won the Ōfuji Noburō Award at the 80th Mainichi Film Concours in 2026.

== Style ==
Mizushiri's animation style is characterized by hand-drawn and stop-motion animation techniques, often focusing on fragments of the human body and sensory touch.

== Filmography and awards ==
- Reina Reina (レイナレイナ, 2009)
- Futon (布団, 2012)
  - Newcomer's Award, 16th Japan Media Arts Festival (2012)
  - Special Award, Stuttgart Festival of Animated Film (2013)
  - Competition Grand Prize, ASK? Film Festival (2012)
  - High Risk Award, Fantoche (2013)
  - Renzo Kinoshita Award, Hiroshima International Animation Festival (2014)
  - Grand Prix, Anima Brussels Cartoon and Animation Film Festival (2014)
  - Honorary Mention, Prix Ars Electronica Computer Animation/Film/VFX category (2014)
  - Special mention from a Grand Competition jury member, Animafest Zagreb (2014)
- Kamakura (かまくら, Snow Hut, 2013)
  - Official Selection, 64th Berlin International Film Festival
- Maku (幕, Veil, 2014)
  - Official Selection, 65th Berlin International Film Festival
- Anxious Body (不安な体, Fuan na Karada, 2021)
  - Premiered in Directors' Fortnight, 74th Cannes Film Festival
  - Animation Division Jury Selection, 25th Japan Media Arts Festival
- Ordinary Life (普通の生活, Futsuu no Seikatsu, 2025)
  - Silver Bear Jury Prize, 75th Berlin International Film Festival (2025)
  - Ōfuji Noburō Award, 80th Mainichi Film Concours (2026)
