= Kari Conte =

American curator and writer

Kari Conte is an American curator and writer focused on global contemporary art. She is the executive director and co-curator of the inaugural Medina Triennial, which is scheduled to open in the summer of 2026 in Medina, New York. She is also a Senior Advisor at the International Studio & Curatorial Program (ISCP) in New York. She previously served as ISCP’s Director of Programs and Exhibitions from 2010 to 2020. She is the Residency Curator at Kai Art Center in Tallinn and a consulting curator with City as Living Laboratory (CALL) in New York. Conte co-founded the working group Rethinking Residencies and was a Fulbright Senior Research Scholar in Istanbul in 2021–2022.

== Early life, education and career ==
Conte was born and grew up in New York City. She earned an MA in Curating Contemporary Art from the Royal College of Art in 2009. Before joining ISCP, she lived in London and worked at Whitechapel Gallery.

Conte joined ISCP in 2010 and led its residencies, exhibitions, and public programs for a decade. She later became Senior Advisor. She is Residency Curator at Kai Art Center in Estonia. She serves as a consulting curator with City as Living Laboratory (CALL). Conte co-founded Rethinking Residencies, a working group of New York–based residency programs established in 2014. She has advised biennials and curated projects internationally, including work with the Aichi Triennale and Performa, and served as an advisor to the 2020/2021 Helsinki Biennial.

In 2024, Conte was named executive director and co-curator of the first Medina Triennial, an international contemporary art exhibition, located in Medina, along the historic Erie Canal in Western New York scheduled to launch in 2026.

== Curatorial work ==
She has curated more than forty exhibitions. These include solo presentations by:

- Fatma Bucak (2022)
- Alban Muja (2021)
- Sonia Leimer (2019)
- Chiara Fumai (2019)
- Hikaru Fujii (2018)
- Jennifer Tee (2018)
- Eva Kot’átková (2016)
- Richard Ibghy & Marilou Lemmens (2016)

She has also organized research-based group exhibitions:

- Concrete Truth: Art and the Documentary (2017)
- The Animal Mirror (2016)
- Aqueous Earth (2015)

In addition, she has curated projects for the Aichi Triennale and the Performa Biennial, and served as Advisor to the Helsinki Biennale.

== Publications and writing ==
She regularly contributes to books, exhibition catalogues, and magazines. As a writer, she is interested in the intersection of art, politics, ecology, and feminism, as well as institutional and exhibition histories.

Her publications include:

- Seven Work Ballets, the first monograph on artist Mierle Laderman Ukeles (Sternberg Press, 2016).
- "In the Spirit of Chiara Fumai," *Metropolis M* (2022).
- "Ezgi Erol," *Unlimited* and the Academy of Fine Arts Vienna (2022).
- Stutters, Dominique Hurth (Printed Matter, 2021).
- "Curatorial Residencies: Saying yes to who or what turns up," Goethe-Institut (2020).
- Localizing the Contemporary: The Kunsthalle Bern Model (JRP|Ringier, 2018).
- Socially Engaged Art: History, Theory, Practice (Film Art Inc., Japan, 2018).

== Teaching ==
Conte is part-time faculty at Parsons School of Design, The New School, where she has taught in Art and Design History and Theory.

== Fellowships and recognition ==
Conte was a Fulbright Senior Research Scholar in Istanbul in 2021–2022.

She is a 2014 alum of the Getty Leadership Institute (GLI).

== Personal life ==
Conte lives and works between New York City and Yalikavak, Turkey.

== Selected bibliography ==
- Mierle Laderman Ukeles: Seven Work Ballets. Ed. Kari Conte. Sternberg Press, 2015.
- Bringing Worlds Together: A Rethinking Residencies Reader. Eds. Kari Conte and Susan Hapgood. Rethinking Residencies, 2023.
- Aqueous Earth & The Animal Mirror. Exhibition catalogue. ISCP, 2017.

== See also ==
- International Studio & Curatorial Program
- Fulbright Program
- Parsons School of Design
