= Joshibi University of Art and Design Junior College =

Private junior college in Tokyo, Japan

Coordinates: 35°41′37.1″N 139°39′42.9″E

- 女子美術大学短期大学部
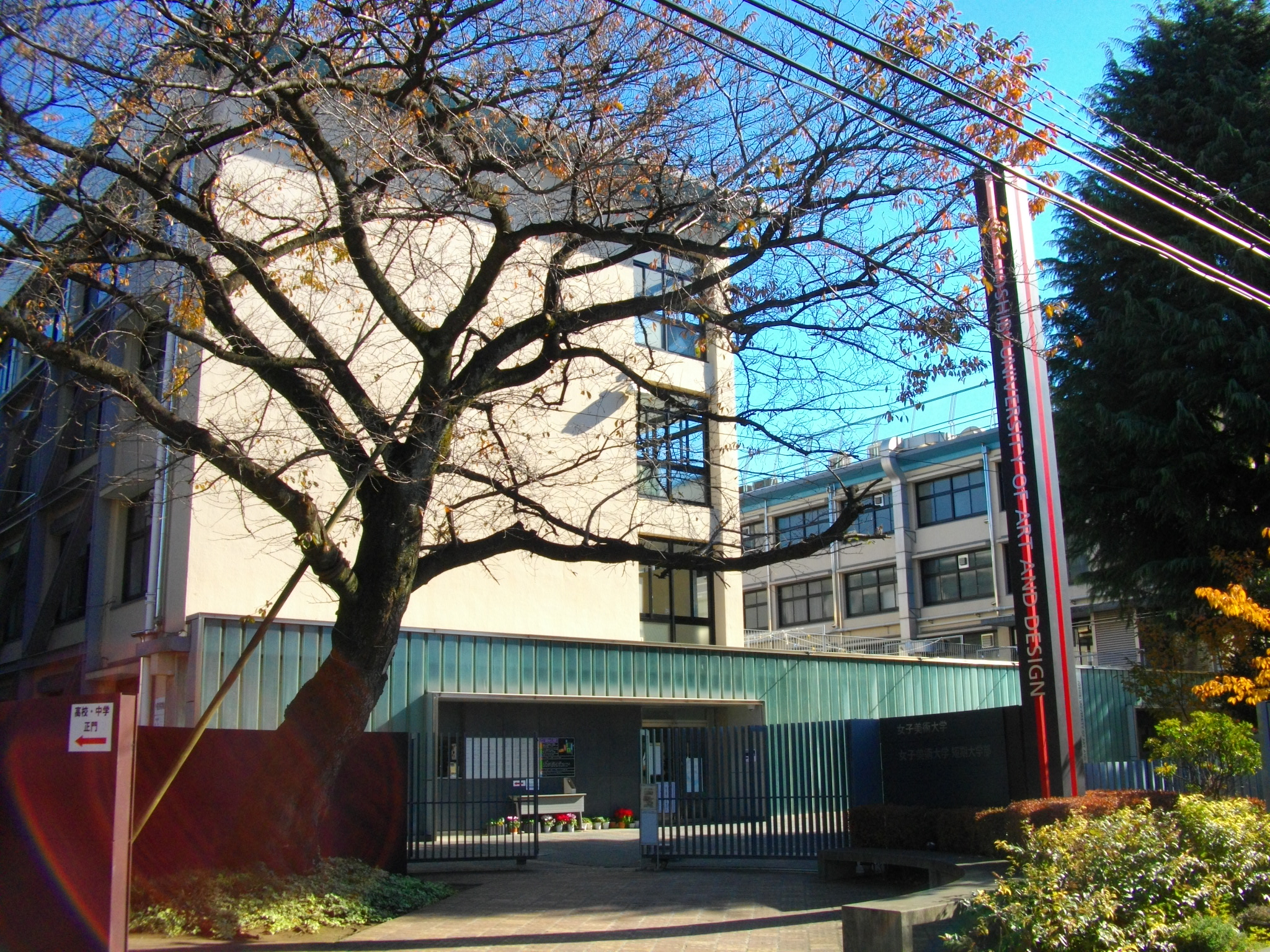
- Type: Private
- Established: 1950
- Location: Suginami, Tokyo, Japan
- Website: www.joshibi.ac.jp/department/juniorcollege

Joshibi University of Art and Design Junior College (女子美術大学短期大学部, Joshi Bijutsu Daigaku Tanki Daigakubu) is a private junior college in Suginami, Tokyo, Japan. It was established in 1950.

== See also ==
- List of junior colleges in Japan
