= Brandon Tauszik =

American photographer and filmmaker

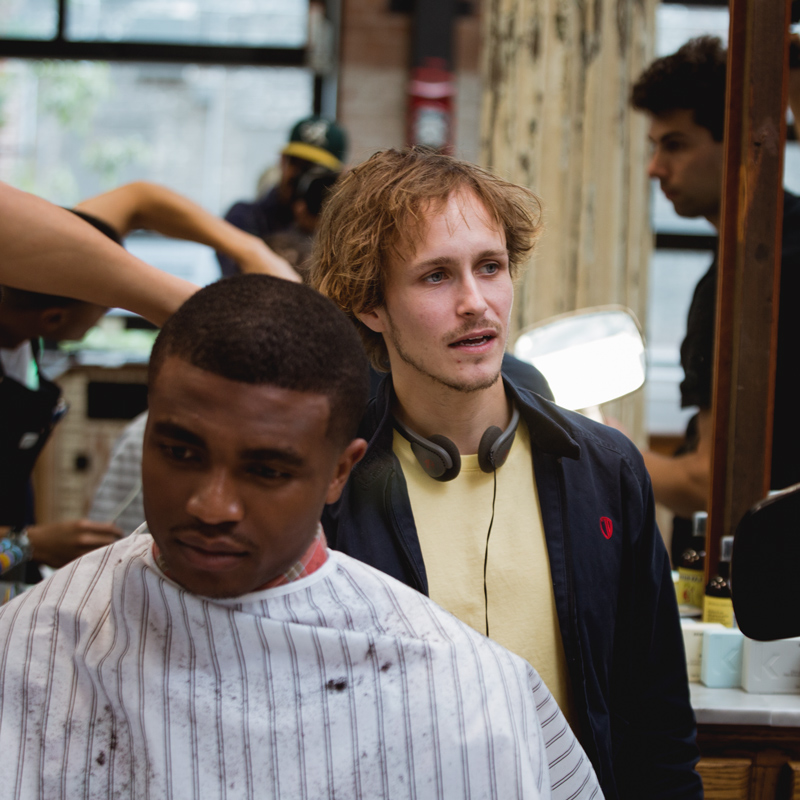
- Born: 1986 (age 39–40)
- Occupation: Photography · Filmmaking
- Website: brandontauszik.com

Brandon Tauszik (born 1986) is an American photographer and filmmaker, based in California.

== Life and work ==
In 2011, Tauszik began covering the doomsday prophesies of Harold Camping and the Family Radio ministry. In 2014, Tauszik began a GIF-based series on Oakland's black barbers called Tapered Throne.

He has directed the music videos for rapper Antwon's "Helicopter" and "Living Every Dream", as well as producer RL Grime's "Heard Me".

== Publications ==
- Pale Blue Dress (2020)
- Fifteen Vaults (2023)
- Water & Power (2024)
