= Bilal Sami (writer) =

Pakistani producer and filmmaker (born 1978)

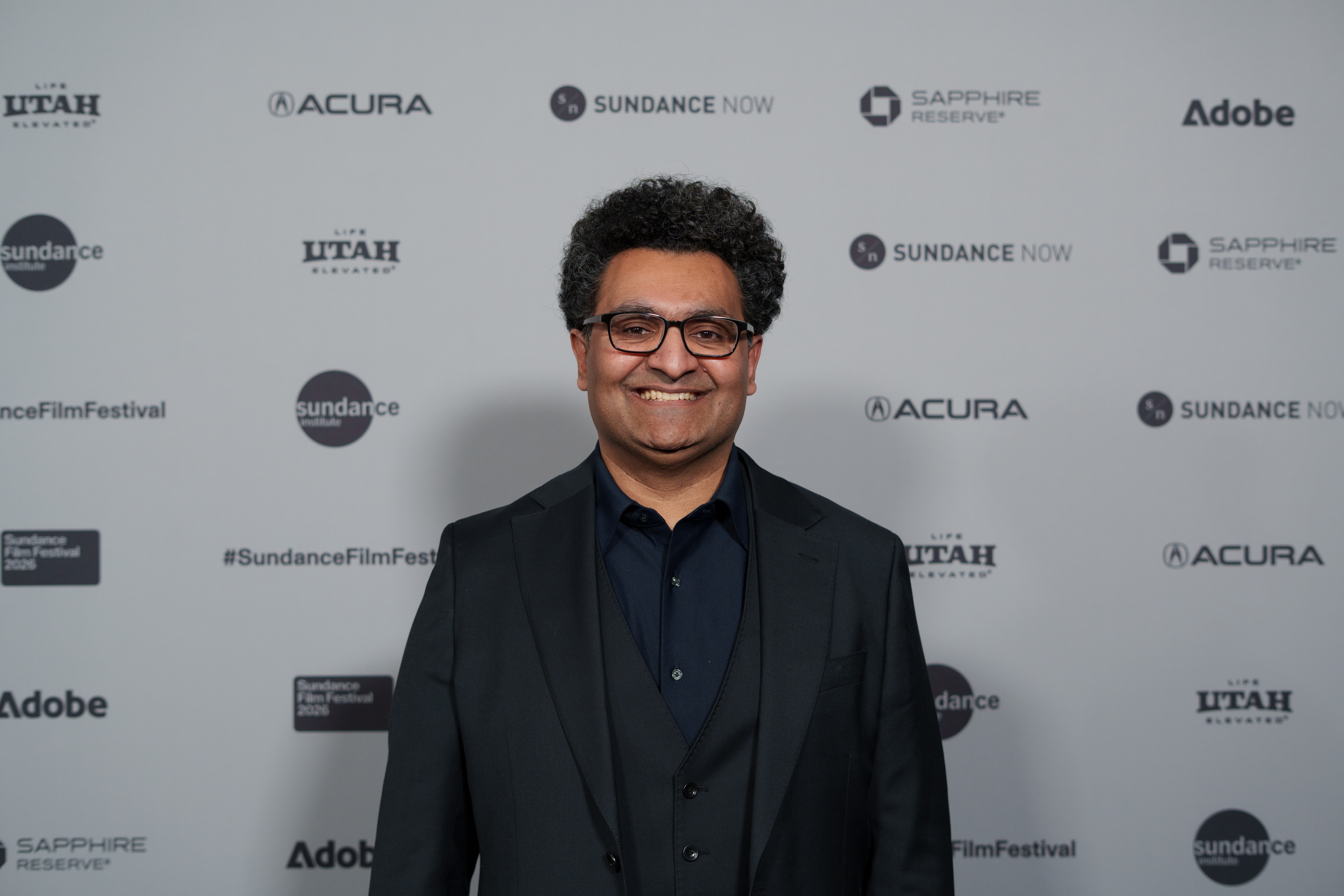
- Bilal Sami at the Hanging By A Wire Premier at Sundance Film Festival
- Born: May 23, 1978 (age 48); Lahore, Pakistan
- Education: Ohio University, USA LUMS, Pakistan
- Occupations: Producer, Screenwriter, Director
- Years active: 1999–present
- Website: www.bilalsami.com

Bilal Sami (born May 23, 1978) is a Pakistani producer, screenwriter and filmmaker. He was born in Lahore and is based in Brooklyn, New York City.

== Career ==
=== Television ===
Sami began his television career on the sitcom Jutt and Bond, airing on Indus Vision (2001–2004). His subsequent television work includes sitcoms Bhatti Ki Bas Ho Gai (2006), Yassu Panju Haar (2009), Yes Sir! (2010), and Dosti Aisa Nata (2009).

Sami was the Series Associate Producer for David Blaine: Do Not Attempt. The documentary series starring the David Blaine was made for Disney+ and National Geographic.

=== Film ===
Bilal is the writer and producer of the documentary film "Hanging by a Wire". The film premiered at the Sundance Film Festival in 2026 in the World Cinema Documentary competition.

In 2019, Sami served as consulting producer for the crime thriller Laal Kabootar which was Pakistan's entry to the 92nd Oscars.

In 2016, Sami co-wrote and associate-produced Dobara Phir Se, a romantic drama directed by Mehreen Jabbar.

Beside his TV and film career he also co-authored several songs with Zeb Bangash and Haniya Aslam of Zeb and Haniya, including Rona Chore Diya from the album Chup!, Jaise Milein Ajnabi for Madras Cafe (2013) and Mein Irada In Season 11

== Filmography ==
=== Film ===
Year	Title	Credit	Notes
2026	Hanging by a Wire	Producer, Writer	Documentary feature
2025	Post Term		Short Film
2019	Laal Kabootar	Consulting Producer	Narrative feature
2016	Dobara Phir Se	Writer, Associate Producer	Narrative feature
2016	Dhun	Director, Co-producer	Documentary short
2012	Panic Button	Producer	Short Film
2010	Off Course	Writer, Director, Producer	Narrative short

=== Television ===
Year	Title	Credit	Platform
2025	David Blaine: Do Not Attempt	Associate Producer	Disney+
2024	Behind The Scene	Co-Producer	Seattle's Tasveer Film Market Selected Projects
2018	Coke Studio 11	Translator, Lyricist	Multiple channels (Pakistan)
2017	The Flying Tent	Translator, Lyricist	YouTube
2011	Counter Terror NYC	Crew	National Geographic (USA)
2011	Blue Collar Dogs	Crew	Nat Geo Wild (USA)
2006–2008	Bhatti Ki Bas Ho Gai	Writer, Actor, Producer	ARY Digital (Pakistan)
2001	Jutt and Bond	Actor (as Dr. Evil)	Indus Vision
