= Mondial du Fromage =

International trade show

The Mondial du Fromage et des Produits Laitiers (World Cheese and Dairy Products Trade Fair) is a biennial international trade show and cheese competition held in Tours, France. It was first held in 2013.

The contest is limited to 10 participants and is overseen by eight judges. The first task is to answer a 20 question written exam. Followed by a blind taste test of cheese, a challenge to cut four identical 250-gram pieces of cheese, and a five-minute oral presentation in which the competitors must share a favorite cheese with the judges. In the second half of the competition, competitors must make a cheese plate.

In 2025, an American won the prize for the first time.
