= Maintenance Artist =

Maintenance Artist is a 2025 documentary film which explores the life and career of artist Mierle Laderman Ukeles.
