= Victor Tadashi Suarez =

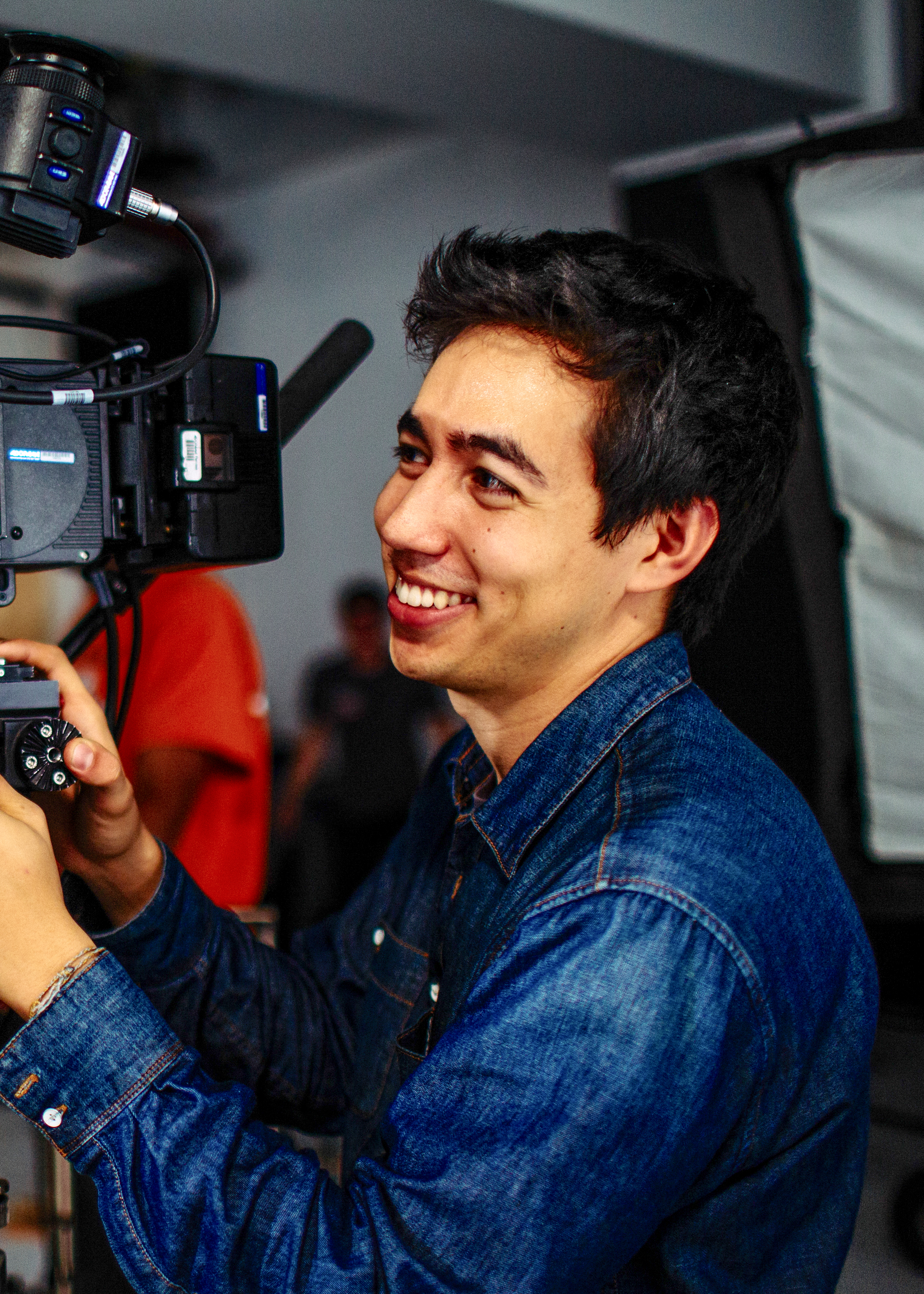
- Born: Orange, California, United States
- Education: Columbia University
- Known for: Cinematographer
- Awards: News and Documentary Emmy
- Website: http://www.tadashi.tv

Victor Tadashi Suárez is an American documentary cinematographer and filmmaker. He is a two-time News & Documentary Emmy Award winner and has worked as director of photography on documentary films and series for outlets including The New York Times, ESPN, PBS, and Investigation Discovery. His short documentary Still Standing (co-directed with journalist Livia Albeck-Ripka) premiered in the short film program at the 2026 Sundance Film Festival

== Career ==
Suárez began his career as a cameraman for Al Jazeera English, serving as the director of photography on the investigative series Fault Lines from 2013 to 2018 During this time, he filmed 45 episodes of Fault Lines and his work on the series earned multiple News & Documentary Emmy nominations (seven in total). After 2018, Suárez worked as a cinematographer on documentary projects for National Geographic, PBS’s Frontline, ESPN, and The New York Times. He was a lead cinematographer for The New York Times Presents (formerly The Weekly) from 2019 to 2023. His feature documentary credits as director of photography include Harvest Season (2018), which aired on PBS Independent Lens, and The Infinite Race (2020) for ESPN’s 30 for 30 series. He was also the cinematographer for The Strike (2024), a film about a California prison hunger strike that aired on PBS Independent Lens in early 2025, and Driver (2024), which premiered at the 2024 Tribeca Film Festival and later aired on PBS’s POV in 2025. In 2025, he was credited as a cinematographer on the Amazon Prime Video docuseries Glitter & Greed: The Lisa Frank Story (2023) and on Quiet on Set: The Dark Side of Kids TV (2024), a four-part investigative series that premiered on Investigation Discovery.

In addition to his cinematography work, Suárez has also directed short films. In 2025, Suárez co-directed the short documentary Still Standing with Livia Albeck-Ripka; the film premiered at the Sundance Film Festival as part of its short film competition.

== Awards ==
Suárez has won two News & Documentary Emmy Awards for his work, and has garnered numerous additional Emmy nominations. In 2020, he was part of the team (alongside journalist Rukmini Callimachi and others) that won the Overseas Press Club’s Edward R. Murrow Award for the short documentary Collision, produced for The New York Times.

== Selected Filmography ==
=== As cinematographer ===
- Harvest Season (2018) – Director: Bernardo Ruiz. Aired on PBS Independent Lens.
- The Infinite Race (2020) – Director: Bernardo Ruiz. ESPN 30 for 30
- The New York Times Presents (series, 2019–2023) – FX / Hulu documentary series by The New York Times (formerly The Weekly)
- Quiet on Set: The Dark Side of Kids TV (2024) – Investigation Discovery docuseries.
- The Strike (2024) – Feature documentary, aired on Independent Lens in 2025
- Driver (2024) – Feature documentary, premiered at Tribeca 2024 and broadcast on PBS POV
- The Return (2025) – Feature documentary, premiered at the 2025 SXSW Film Festival

=== As director ===
- Alpha Mare (2019) – Short documentary, co-directed with Mimi Wilcox.
- Uncle Morris (2025) – Short fiction film, co-directed with Max Azulay
- Still Standing (2026) – Short documentary, co-directed with Livia Albeck-Ripka
