= SIFF Cinema Uptown =

Cinema in Queen Anne neighborhood, Seattle

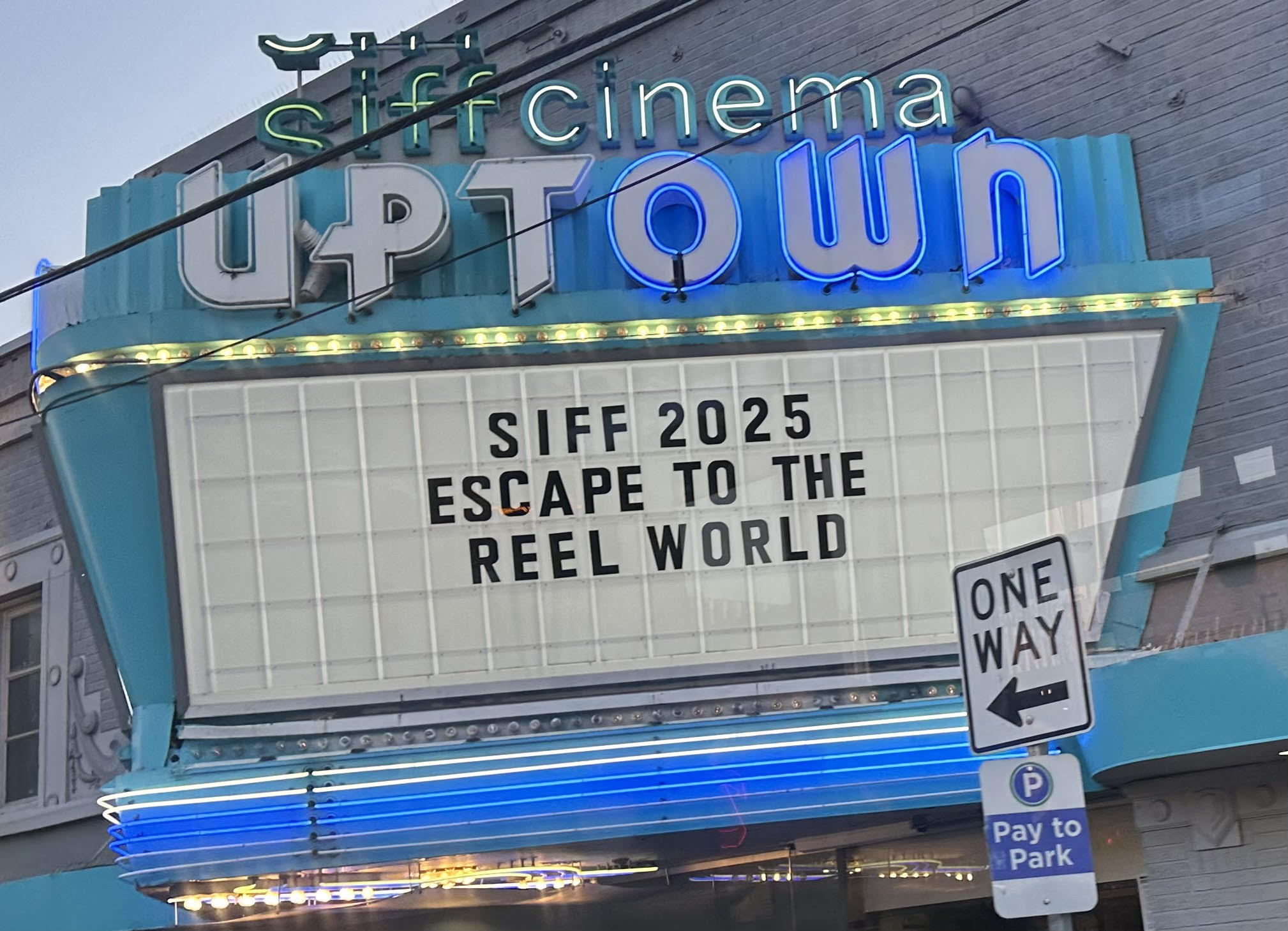
- The Uptown Theater marquee in April 2025
- Interactive map of SIFF Cinema Uptown
- Former names: Uptown Theater
- Address: 511 Queen Anne Ave N Seattle, Washington, U.S.
- Coordinates: 47.62352°N 122.3597372°W
- Owner: Seattle International Film Festival

Construction
- Opened: 1926
- Renovated: 1930, 1939, 1947, 1953, 2011
- Expanded: 1984

Website
- SIFF.net

The SIFF Cinema Uptown, originally known as the Uptown Theater, is a movie theater in the Queen Anne neighborhood of Seattle, Washington. It is owned and operated by the Seattle International Film Festival (SIFF).

== Pre-SIFF history ==
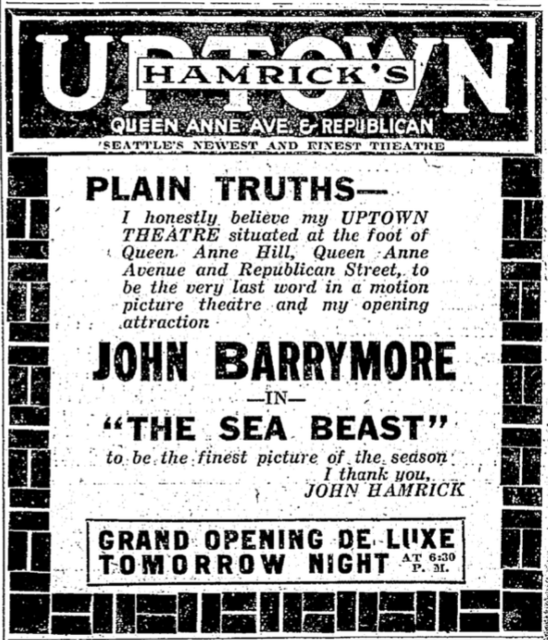
Advert for The Sea Beast at the Uptown Theater

Theater entrepreneur John Hamrick opened the Uptown Theater on May 25, 1926 as a single screen movie theater capable of seating 800. It was designed by architect Victor W. Voorhees. Capable of only showing silent films, it opened with The Sea Beast accompanied by an orchestra.

On May 28, 1930, the Uptown Theater reopened with a Western Electric sound system with a double bill of Officer O'Brien and Three Live Ghosts. In November 1936, realtor Henry Broderick's firm leased the theater for ten years. In April 1939, the remodeled theater reopened with a policy of "showing first-run foreign films," beginning with The Lady Vanishes.

Sometime in the 1940s the flat marquee was replace with a neon sign on a triangular marquee. B. Marcus Priteca oversaw renovations in 1947 and 1953.

In 1984, an adjacent building next door was demolished. An expansion to the Uptown Theater on that site added two new theaters. Renovations to original theater expanded the lobby and the refreshment counter, added adjacent rest rooms, and reduced the seating capacity of the original theater.

In 2005, SIFF began using the Uptown Theater as one of the five venues for its 2005 festival. However, in November 2010, AMC Theatres, the owner at the time, closed the theater.

== SIFF era ==
In August 2011, SIFF announced that it had taken over AMC's lease for the Uptown Theater as part of a $2.8 million capital campaign. The renovated venue reopened that October in conjunction with the SIFF Film Center, a new nearby venue at the Seattle Center.

In 2013, there was a possibility that the property would be sold and redeveloped. Instead, SIFF began to make an off-market purchase with the help of a philanthropic supporter. At its 2014 festival, SIFF announced that it had purchased the Uptown Cinema for $2.6 million, two years before its lease was to expire.

In March 2020, SIFF closed all its venues due to the COVID-19 pandemic, including the Uptown. It reopened for Thanksgiving in 2021.
