= The Gnawer of Rocks =

2025 Canadian animated short film

- Inuktitut: Mangittatuarjuk
- Directed by: Louise Flaherty
- Written by: Louise Flaherty; Neil Christopher
- Produced by: Louise Flaherty; Danny Christopher; Neil Christopher
- Starring: Nellie Enuaraq; Levi Enuaraq-Strauss; Andrea Flaherty; Bridgette Joanas; Joan Joanas; Jonah Oolayou; Opah Picco
- Cinematography: Evan DeRushie
- Edited by: Evan DeRushie; Kyle MacLean
- Music by: Beatrice Deer; Michael Felber; Mark Wheaton
- Animation by: Edwin Alvarenga; Kyla Atlas; Abbey Collings; Evan DeRushie; Philip Eddolls; Meaghan Hettler; Akash Jones; Colin Lepper; Ghazal Tahernia
- Production company: Taqqut Productions
- Release date: June 2025 (Annecy)
- Running time: 14 minutes
- Country: Canada
- Language: Inuktitut

The Gnawer of Rocks (Inuktitut: Mangittatuarjuk) is a Canadian short animated film, directed by Louise Flaherty and released in 2025. Adapted from Flaherty's own 2017 children's book Mangittatuarjuk, the film recounts a traditional Inuit legend about two young women who are trapped in the lair of Mangittatuarjuk, the Gnawer of Rocks, but draw on the teachings of their community elders to escape and defeat the monster.

The film's voice cast includes Nellie Enuaraq, Levi Enuaraq-Strauss, Andrea Flaherty, Bridgette Joanas, Joan Joanas, Jonah Oolayou and Opah Picco.

The film premiered at the 2025 Annecy International Animation Film Festival, and had its Canadian premiere at the 2025 Ottawa International Film Festival.

It was later screened at the 2026 Sundance Film Festival.

== Awards ==
The film received a Canadian Screen Award nomination for Best Animated Short at the 14th Canadian Screen Awards in 2026, and won the Moon Jury Award at the 2026 ImagineNATIVE Film and Media Arts Festival.
