= Nina Chermak Rosenberg =

American costume designer

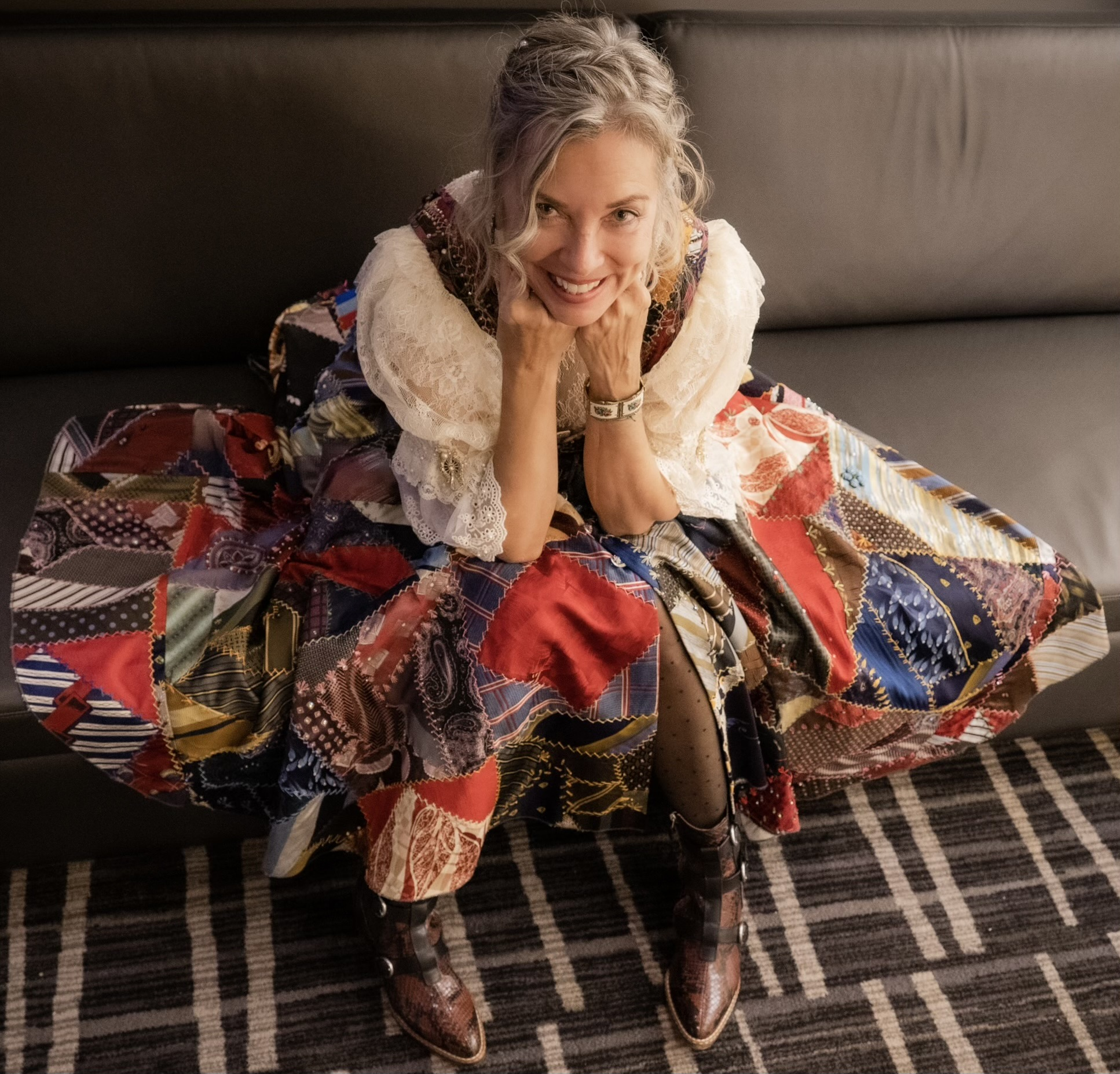
- Rosenberg in a dress made from a quilt
- Born: 1958/59; Beaver, Pennsylvania, U.S.
- Education: Parsons School of Design (BFA)
- Occupations: Fashion designer; Costume designer; Stitcher; Dresser
- Children: 3

Nina Chermak Rosenberg is an American fashion and costume designer. Born in Beaver, Pennsylvania, Rosenberg discovered her passion for design when she was young, later graduating from Parsons School of Design with a Bachelor of Fine Arts. Staying in New York City after college, she worked for designers Ralph Lauren and Alexander Julian before moving to Louisville, Kentucky in 2003. Here, Rosenberg began her career as a costume designer, stitcher, and dresser for a number of plays and performances; including Wicked, Hamilton, and Disney on Ice. Here, Rosenburg also began working intermittently as a freelance designer, producing two award-winning hats for the Kentucky Derby.

In 2018, Rosenberg completed her first work in filmography, designing costumes in the Sam Irvin film Engaged to a Psycho. She has since worked on nine other movies, and is married with three children.

== Early life and education ==
Rosenberg was born in 1958/59 in Beaver, Pennsylvania, where she was raised in a family of eight. Inspired by her mother, Olga, who sewed much of what their family wore: Rosenberg designed her first piece of clothing at age eleven: a green shift dress with a matching triangle scarf. While enrolled at Beaver Area Middle School, Rosenberg decided to make designing her future profession. After high school, Rosenberg moved to New York City to attend Parsons School of Design, where she graduated with a Bachelor of Fine Arts in fashion design.

== Career ==
Rosenberg began her career as fashion designer in the menswear design/production department for Ralph Lauren after graduating from college. From there, Rosenberg began work for the Alexander Julian Collection, where she became the assistant designer for the uniforms of the Charlotte Hornets when they joined the NBA in 1988.

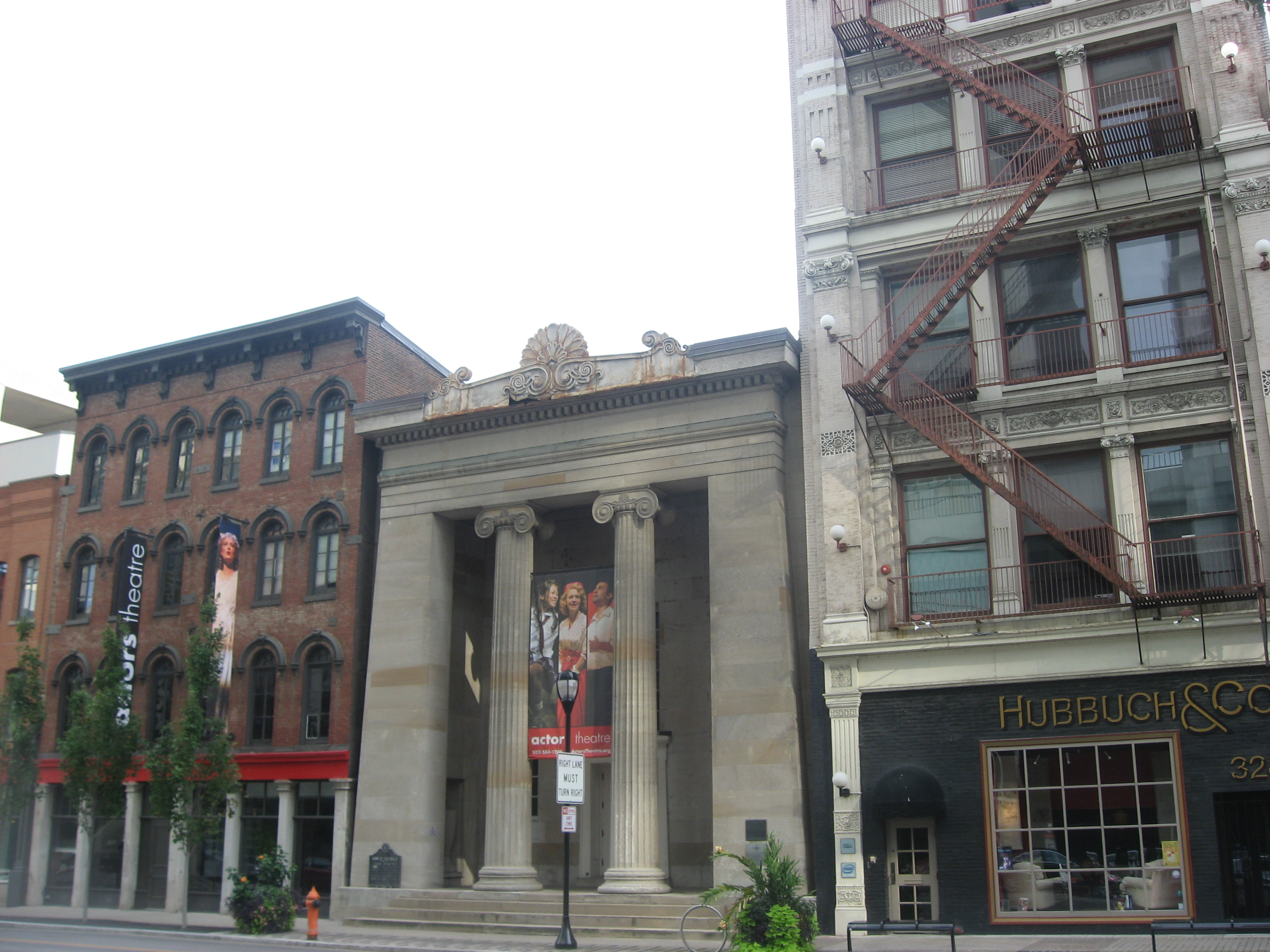
The Actors Theatre of Louisville, where Rosenberg often worked, 2012

Rosenberg later moved to Louisville, Kentucky in 2003, where she began work as a costume stitcher and dresser for plays at the Actors Theatre of Louisville and Humana Festival which took place there. Additionally, as an IATSE member, Rosenburg worked in the costume department as a at The Kentucky Center for the Performing Arts, KFC Yum! Center, and Palace Theatres. In her career, Rosenberg worked on a number of shows: including Wicked, Motown: The Musical, Aladdin, and Hamilton, as well as performances for Cirque du Soleil, Disney on Ice, Carrie Underwood, Justin Bieber, Demi Lovato, Nick Jonas, Selena Gomez, Mariah Carey and the character "Madea".

=== Freelance fashion design ===
Since leaving New York City, Rosenberg has also worked intermittently as a freelance fashion designer: creating hats, special-occasion dresses, children's clothing, and other accessories. Key aspects of Rosenberg's freelance design include adding texture, subtle details, asymmetric patterns, comfortable fabrics, and vintage characteristics into her works. Rosenberg found most success with her hats, which she has sold on Etsy, as well as entered into competitions for the Kentucky Derby. To date, Rosenberg has won two such competitions: first in 2007 for the "Chrysler Sebring Hats Off to the Derby" hat design contest, in which she won the convertible as a prize, and again in 2009 for the 'Courier-Journal's 1st Derby fashion race' with her woven straw hat titled "Sterling Silver Rose in Bloom".

=== Filmography ===
Rosenberg has worked as a costume designer or in a branch of costume department for ten films, which are displayed in the table below.

Rosenberg filmography
Year	Title	Director	Credited
2018	Engaged to a Psycho	Sam Irvin	Yes
2018	The Perfect One	Nick Everhart	Yes
2019	Devil's Revenge	Jared Cohn	Yes
2020	Becoming	Omar Naim	Yes
2020	Disturbing the Peace	York Shackleton	Yes
2020	JL Family Ranch 2	Sean McNamara	Yes
2021	Masquerade	Shane Dax Taylor	Yes
2023	Desperation Road	Nadine Crocker	Yes
2024	Red Right Hand	Eshom Nelms	Yes
2024	Saint Clare	Mitzi Peirone	Yes
Upcoming	So Much for Love	Lina Roessler	Yes

== Personal life ==
Nina is married to Richard Rosenberg, an energy broker, and has three kids named Natasha, Josh, and Olivia.
