= Fairfield High School, Bristol =

Fairfield High School
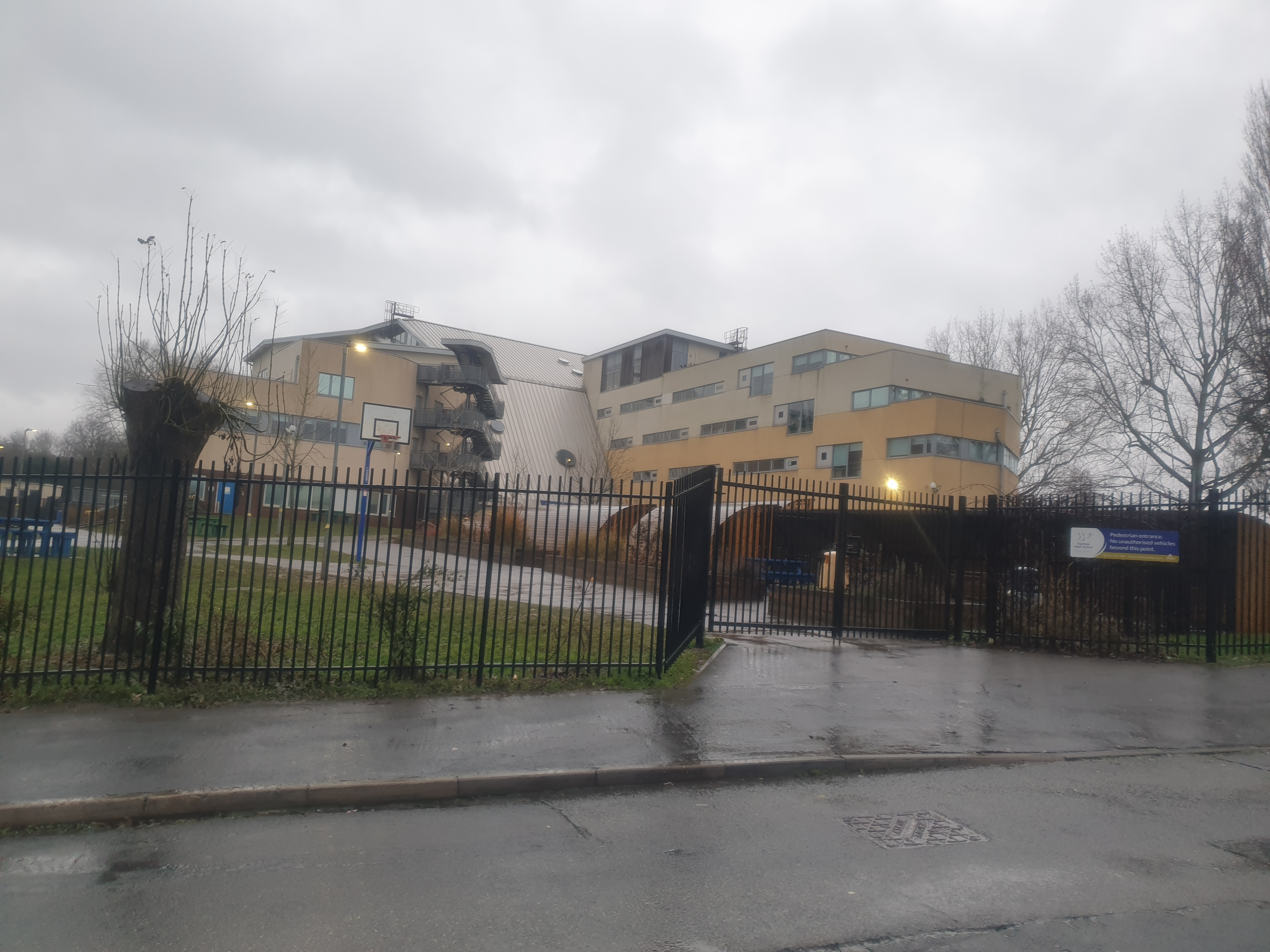

Location
- Allfoxton Road; Bristol, BS7 9NL; England; 51.4758°N 2.5712°W

Information
- Type: Secondary Academy
- Established: 2000
- Trust: Excalibur Academies Trust
- Specialist: Performing and Visual arts
- Department for Education URN: 141705 Tables
- Ofsted: Reports
- Principal: Edel Cronin
- Gender: Mixed
- Age: 11 to 16
- Enrolment: 733 (Data from January 2016)
- Capacity: 1080 (Data from January 2016)
- Website: https://www.fairfield.bristol.sch.uk/
- Building details

General information
- Architectural style: Modern
- Completed: 2006
- Cost: £22 million

Design and construction
- Architect: Building Design Partnership
- Main contractor: Cowlin Construction

Fairfield High School is a co-educational secondary school with academy status, located in the Horfield area of Bristol, England. The school serves a catchment area that includes Horfield, Lockleaze, and Eastville.

Originally established in 1898, the institution operated as Fairfield Grammar School for over a century before reorganising as a comprehensive school in 2000. In 2006, the school relocated from its Victorian premises in Montpelier to a new £22 million purpose-built campus, which it shares with the Elmfield School for the Deaf. The school joined the Excalibur Academies Trust in 2015 and specialises in the performing and visual arts.

== History ==
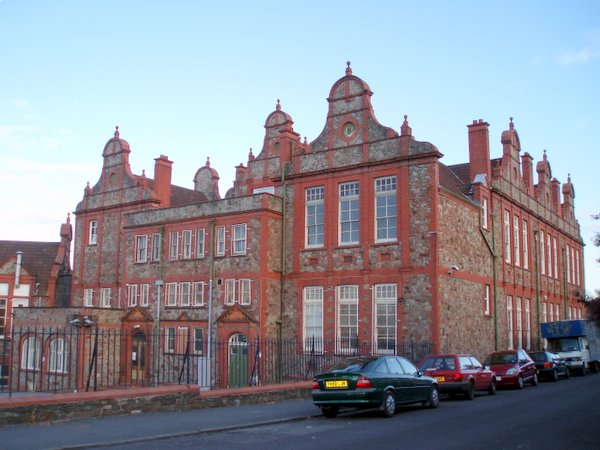
The previous school building in Fairlawn Road, Montpelier, before relocating to Allfoxton Road, Lockleaze

The institution was established in 1898 as a Higher Grade School on a site in Montpelier, bounded by Falkland Road, Fairlawn Road, and Fairfield Road. Opening with a roll of 180 pupils, it was redesignated as Fairfield Secondary School in 1904. In 1945, following the Education Act 1944, it became a state grammar school.

In 2000, amid opposition from Bristol City Council regarding selective education and concerns over declining academic results, the school closed as a grammar school and reopened as a comprehensive, adopting the name Fairfield High School. The Montpelier site, a Grade II listed building, was deemed to have insufficient capacity, accommodating only 500 pupils. Consequently, in 2006, the school relocated to a new purpose-built facility on Allfoxton Road in Lockleaze, on the site of the former St Thomas More Catholic Secondary School. The construction of the new premises cost £22 million.

In 2014, the school premises began hosting a branch of the Military Preparation College, a training provider for 16-to-19-year-olds not in education, employment, or training (NEET). The college, which utilised ex-military instructors to prepare students for armed forces careers, held its first awards ceremony at the school in June of that year. The school has also co-located with Elmfield School for the Deaf, which shares the premises. In 2025 the secondary department of Elmfield School for the Deaf was scheduled to relocate to the nearby Badock's Wood Academy due to rising pupil numbers and space constraints at the Fairfield site.

The school is designated as a School of Sanctuary, a status reflecting its welcoming of refugees and asylum seekers, and it displays the flags of over 80 nations in the atrium to represent the diversity of its student body.

== Academic achievement ==
The school has improved its results year on year and achieved its best ever GCSE scores in 2012, the table below shows the percentage of students hitting the key measure of 5 A*-C including English and Mathematics.

In 2025, Department for Education data ranked the school as the 103rd most improved in England and among the top ten in the South West for the progress of disadvantaged students.

Year	2009	2010	2011	2012
School	43%	49%	50%	52%
Local authority schools	40.2%	46.2%	50.2%	51.6%
England - all schools	49.8%	53.5%	59%	59.4%

== Architecture ==
The current school building, completed in 2006 at a cost of £22 million, was designed by Building Design Partnership and built by Cowlin Construction. The interior is organised around a five-storey central atrium, which serves as the focal point of the building's circulation, and creates a sharp distinction between the classrooms and the public circulation areas. The classrooms are located off three distinct wings which branch from the atrium. While intended to unify the school, the design has been noted for supporting a "centralised leadership" model, wherein staff can observe movements in the school from various vantage points. A study Joanna Sutherland and Rosamund Sutherland has noted that the open nature of the ground floor and the internal balconies generate acoustic problems that further inhibit conversational exchanges in these transit areas. The atrium design, featuring open balconies and high-level walkways similar to those found in shopping malls, drew criticism regarding safety standards following a student fall in 2012. An investigation by Bristol City Council concluded that the building's design complied with all relevant regulations and was not to blame for the accident.

Recent additions to the building include a large-scale mural near the gymnasium created by artist Rosie Caley. The artwork features prominent BAME and LGBTQI+ athletes, among others. The central atrium also features a prominent mural by artist Scott Walker, unveiled in 2010, which depicts the four figures for whom the school's houses are named: Cary Grant, Hannah More, Banksy, and Clive Smith. At the unveiling, the school reported receiving a message of support from Banksy himself. In 2019, students planted 150 metres of hedging along the perimeter fence as part of National Tree Week. The grounds also contain an orchard, comprising one tree per tutor group each school year, and Norfolk pine trees. A replica brass-coloured acrylic war memorial was installed near the entrance in 2019, replacing the original brass plaque from the Montpelier site which had suffered from weathering.

== Sports pitches ==
The school's sporting provision is detached from the main Allfoxton Road campus, utilising a site on Muller Road. The facilities comprise a set of enclosed artificial pitches adjoining Boiling Wells Lane, opened in 2007, and a later extension onto the adjacent South Purdown meadow providing three grass pitches for rugby and football. The design of the South Purdown enclosure attempts to soften its visual impact on the open land through the integration of 1.2-metre perimeter fencing masked by hedgerows, though this rises to 5 metres against the boundary with local allotments. The artificial pitches are demarcated by twenty-four 4.5-metre steel columns designed to mount security apparatus.

Between 2003 and 2009, the construction of the grass pitches on South Purdown, split from the rest of Purdown by Muller Road, was the subject of a protracted planning dispute. The £2 million proposal was opposed by local residents and conservation groups, who argued the enclosure would damage a public amenity and restrict rights of way. A public inquiry in late 2008 ruled in favour of the school, accepting the need to secure 50,000 square metres of open space to meet government guidelines for the 1,120 pupils. Separately, in 2008, the school applied for planning permission to install Mosquito ultrasonic dispersal devices on the steel columns around its artificial pitches to deter vandalism. The proposal drew criticism from residents and the Children's Commissioner for England, but was ultimately approved by the city council in May 2009.

== Notable former pupils ==
- Jacob Anderson (also known as Raleigh Ritchie), actor and singer
- Alex Beresford, weatherman
- Victor Eyles FRSE, geologist and science historian
- Cary Grant, actor
- Peter Holmström, musician
- Jamie Knight-Lebel, footballer
- Laya Lewis, actress
- Guy Remmers, actor
