= Imogen Waterhouse =

English actress and model (born 1994)

Imogen Waterhouse (born 8 June 1994) is an English actress and model. She starred in the horror film Braid (2018) and on television, she is known for her roles in the CW series The Outpost (2018–2021), where she also made her directorial debut, and the Apple TV+ series The Buccaneers (2023–present).

== Early life and education ==
Waterhouse grew up in Chiswick, London, the daughter of Elizabeth, a cancer care nurse, and Norman Waterhouse, a plastic surgeon. She has an older sister named Suki and is known as "Immy" to her friends and family. After attending Ibstock Place School in London, she studied performing arts at ArtsEd and completed a three-year program at Oxford School of Drama.

In 2014 Waterhouse signed with Next Management, which also represents Suki. However, she decided to pursue a primarily acting-based career and trained at the Oxford School of Drama.

== Career ==
Since 2015 Waterhouse has appeared in guest roles in various TV series and had supporting roles in the 2016 thriller Nocturnal Animals and the 2017 film The Last Photograph. In 2018 she was cast in a leading role in the horror film Braid.

From 2018-2020, Waterhouse starred in the American fantasy television series The Outpost, in which she played Princess Rosmund, the last surviving member of an overthrown and murdered royal family. Her character departed the show in the season three finale. Waterhouse made her directorial debut with the season three episode "She Is Not A God" and returned to the show in season four to direct the episodes "All We Do Is Say Goodbye" and "The Power of the Masters".

In 2019 Waterhouse appeared in the short film Rain Stops Play by Mika Simmons, playing a young American woman who becomes the love interest of a gallery owner in New York. In June 2022, she was cast in a starring role in the Apple TV+ drama television series The Buccaneers, based on the Edith Wharton novel. The show was renewed for a second season in December 2023.

== Filmography ==
Television and film roles
Year	Title	Role	Notes	Ref.
2015	The Coroner	Sophie Bailey	Episode: "First Love"	
2016	Stan Lee's Lucky Man	Lucie	Episode: "Win Some, Lose Some"	
2016	Nocturnal Animals	Chloe	Film; supporting role	
2017	The Halcyon	Lady Alexandra Cooper	Episode 1.1	
2017	The Last Photograph	Daughter	Film; supporting role	
2018	Braid	Petula Thames / Doctor	Film; main role	
2018–2021	The Outpost	Gwynn Calkussar / Princess Rosmund	Main role (season 1–3); also director, 3 episodes	
2021	The Irregulars	Eleanor Margot	Episode: "Both the Needle and the Knife"	
2023–2025	The Buccaneers	Jinny St. George	TV series; main role	
