= The Buccaneers (2023 TV series) =

Period drama television series

- Genre: Historical drama
- Created by: Katherine Jakeways
- Based on: The Buccaneers by Edith Wharton
- Starring: Kristine Froseth; Alisha Boe; Matthew Broome; Josh Dylan; Barney Fishwick; Aubri Ibrag; Guy Remmers; Mia Threapleton; Josie Totah; Imogen Waterhouse; Christina Hendricks
- Theme music composer: Aisling Brouwer; Anna Phoebe
- Countries of origin: United Kingdom; United States
- Original language: English
- No. of seasons: 2
- No. of episodes: 16

Production
- Executive producers: Beth Willis; George Faber; Katherine Jakeways; Susanna White
- Running time: 49–55 minutes
- Production company: The Forge

Original release
- Network: Apple TV+
- Release: 8 November 2023 – 6 August 2025
- Network: Apple TV

The Buccaneers is a historical drama television series created by Katherine Jakeways, based on the unfinished novel of the same name by American novelist Edith Wharton, published posthumously in 1938. Set in the 1870s during the Gilded Age, it revolves around five wealthy and ambitious American women and their experiences in London high society as they deal with culture clashes, differing approaches to tradition, friendship, and love. The series stars an ensemble cast led by Kristine Froseth, Alisha Boe, Aubri Ibrag, Josie Totah, and Imogen Waterhouse. Matthew Broome, Josh Dylan, Barney Fishwick, Guy Remmers, Mia Threapleton, and Christina Hendricks also star.

The first season premiered on 8 November 2023 on Apple TV+ and received positive reviews from critics. The second season premiered on 18 June 2025.

On 8 October 2025, the show was renewed for a third season.

== Premise ==
In the 1870s, the "Buccaneers" are five ambitious young women and daughters of the American nouveau riche—Nan and Jinny St. George, Conchita Closson, and Lizzy and Mabel Elmsworth. Following Conchita's wedding to Lord Richard Marable, the women are invited to London in the midst of debutante season in the hopes of securing husbands and titles. The women's eccentric and extroverted nature contrasts with English high society and centuries of tradition as they navigate cultural clashes and strict social codes while dealing with interpersonal relationships and potential suitors.

== Cast and characters ==
=== Main ===
- Kristine Froseth as Annabel "Nan" St. George, a young American woman in England
- Alisha Boe as Conchita Closson, Annabel's friend, an American adjusting to life among the British aristocracy
- Matthew Broome as Guy Thwarte, Theodore's best friend, and a world traveller who enters into a scandalous relationship with Annabel
- Josh Dylan as Lord Richard Marable (seasons 1–2), husband of Conchita, son of Lord Brightlingsea, and who has a preference for American society despite his family's wishes
- Barney Fishwick as Lord James Seadown, a possessive young man who forms a controlling relationship with Virginia
- Aubri Ibrag as Elizabeth "Lizzy" Elmsworth, older sister of Mabel, and later the fiancée of Hector Robinson
- Guy Remmers as Theodore, Duke of Tintagel, the fiancé of Annabel in season 1 and her husband in season 2
- Mia Threapleton as Honoria Marable, Richard Marable's sister, who develops a covert lesbian relationship with Mabel
- Josie Totah as Mabel Elmsworth, Elizabeth's younger sister, who is in a secret relationship with Honoria
- Imogen Waterhouse as Virginia "Jinny" St. George, Annabel's older sister, and later wife of James Seadown
- Christina Hendricks as Patricia "Patti" St. George, Annabel and Virginia's mother, and wife to Tracy St. George
- Simone Kirby as Laura Testvalley (season 1), a governess to Annabel
- Amelia Bullmore as the Dowager Duchess of Tintagel, Theo's mother, who holds Annabel to a high standard
- Fenella Woolgar as Lady Brightlingsea, Richard's mother matriarch and effective manager of the Brightlingsea estate
- Anthony Calf as Lord Brightlingsea (seasons 1–2), the sickly patriarch of a British estate
- Adam James as Colonel Tracy St. George, Annabel and Virginia's father, and husband of Patricia
- Jacob Ifan as Hector Robinson (season 2), a Member of Parliament, who becomes engaged to Elizabeth
- Leighton Meester as Nell (season 2), Patricia's younger sister, and secretly Annabel's biological mother

=== Recurring ===
- Shobhit Piasa as Miles Dawnley (season 1)
- Francesca Corney as Jean Hopeleigh (season 1)
- Greg Wise as Reede Robinson (season 2), an old flame of the Dowager Duchess of Tintagel
- Maria Almeida as Cora Merrigan (season 2), a rich young American woman whom Conchita is hired to find a husband for
- Grace Ambrose as Paloma Ballardino (season 2), an Italian woman who befriends Jinny and Guy

=== Guest ===
- Dylan Mulvaney as Miss Bloomingdale

== Episodes ==
=== Series overview ===
Series	Episodes	Originally released	
Series	Episodes	First released	Last released
1	8	8 November 2023	13 December 2023
2	8	18 June 2025	6 August 2025

=== Season 1 (2023) ===
No. overall	No. in season	Title	Directed by	Written by	Original release date
1	1	"American Poison"	Susanna White	Katherine Jakeways	8 November 2023
Encouraged by the whirlwind marriage of their friend Conchita to Lord Richard Marable, the American nouveau riche daughters of the St. George and Elmsworth families are sent to England to find husbands. Jinny St. George and Lizzy Elmsworth enter London society as debutantes. Both are attracted to Richard's younger brother James, even as Richard's family looks down on them. The unconventional manners of Jinny's sister Nan catch the eye of a bachelor, Guy Thwarte. Jinny accidentally reveals to Nan that the latter is secretly illegitimate, and Nan is sent on a tour of Cornwall to not disturb Jinny's marital aspirations. While swimming in the sea, Nan meets Theo, a duke seeking a wife who does not care about his status.
2	2	"Women or Wives"	Susanna White	Katherine Jakeways	8 November 2023
Conchita throws a house party in Runnymede, with her and Richard's friends in attendance. James rebuffs Jinny and dances with Lizzy. While playing a game of sardines, Mabel nearly kisses Honoria. James forces a humiliated Lizzy to strip nude in front of him. Conchita overhears Richard saying that she will never fit in and leaves. Nan confides her parentage to Guy, who leaves. Theo arrives and proposes to Nan.
3	3	"The Perfect Duchess"	Richard Senior	Katherine Jakeways	8 November 2023
As Nan ponders Theo's proposal, his mother hosts a private ball at Tintagel. Nan grows closer to Theo and connects with the dowager duchess but is disturbed by the arrival of Guy, who is revealed to be Theo's closest friend. Meanwhile, Jinny and James have eloped. Nan dances with Theo at the ball, but the event is interrupted by Conchita running into the rain. Richard finds her and the two reconcile; Mabel and Honoria kiss. Guy assures Nan he will keep her illegitimacy secret from Theo. The next morning, Nan tells Theo that she is willing to marry him but must first return to New York; he asks to come with her.
4	4	"Homecoming"	Richard Senior	Catherine Shepherd	15 November 2023
The girls arrive in New York, where Patricia St. George throws a lavish party to celebrate her daughters' successful courtships, but Nan rebuffs her and declares her intention to tell Theo the truth. Nan unsuccessfully asks her father for information. Meanwhile, Guy drunkenly sends a telegram confessing his love to Nan, which Theo reads. Lavinia Elmsworth catches Mabel kissing a maid; Conchita worries she and Richard will not escape the Brightlingseas. Nan reconciles with Patricia, who assures her that she is her daughter. Theo asks Nan for a quick marriage. Patricia tells her husband that their marriage is over.
5	5	"Failed Betrayal"	Richard Senior	Roanne Bardsley & Emma Jane Unsworth	22 November 2023
While attempting to hide his family's lack of funds, Guy hosts a celebration of Bonfire Night at his estate. Theo invites Jean, hoping to set up a match with her and Guy. The group is tasked with finding a torch in a hedge maze, during which Nan learns about Guy's telegram, and Jinny and Lizzy rekindle their friendship. Mabel and Honoria sleep together. Conchita, now living separately from Richard, helps Nan realise that she is really in love with Guy. Theo confronts Guy at a poker game with Nan, though Theo reconciles with Nan and Guy at the bonfire. Mabel also lashes out at Honoria.
6	6	"It's Christmas"	Charlotte Regan	Anna-Maria Ssemuyaba	29 November 2023
The group spends Christmas with the Tintagels. Guy, who is now courting Jean, makes tentative peace with Nan and her impending marriage. Lizzy admits James' torment of her to Jinny, who rejects the notion that James is abusive; Jinny also admits Nan's illegitimacy to James. Mabel decides to enter a marriage of convenience to Miles so she and Lizzy can stay in England. Seeing how happy Conchita and Richard are together, Mrs. Testvalley leaves their service. James tells the dowager duchess of Nan's birth, and Nan privately admits her relief at the engagement's end to Guy. She publicly admits her illegitimacy at Christmas luncheon, where Theo declares his love for and intention to marry her.
7	7	"First Footing"	Charlotte Regan	Roanne Bardsley	6 December 2023
The group attends a New Year's Eve party hosted at the Brightlingsea estate, where Nan feels outcast by other guests for her illegitimacy. Nan and Jinny's parents arrive, and Patti scolds Jinny for revealing Nan's secret. She later informs her husband that she will be divorcing him after Nan's wedding. Guy and Nan share a moment on the roof, and when they return downstairs, Theo reveals he knew about the telegram, leading to a fight between him and Guy. Guy reveals to Nan that Theo knew about the telegram but hid it from them, and Theo forces Guy to recite the telegram. Nan confronts Theo about knowing about her mother and not saying anything and storms off. Meanwhile, Lizzy is publicly embarrassed by James and condemns Jinny for their behaviour. Jinny, secretly pregnant, attempts to leave the party but returns to James' side. Honoria subtly shares to Richard her knowledge of his and Lady Testvalley's affair before reminding him how happy he is with Conchita. His mother reveals that she knew about the affair, and Richard is later comforted by Conchita. Guy and Theo make amends before saying goodbye. Nan talks to Guy, and he re-affirms his love for her but also reveals that he asked Lady Hopeleigh to marry him, further explaining that they both needed to move on.
8	8	"Wedding of the Season"	Charlotte Regan	Katherine Jakeways	13 December 2023
The day before her wedding, Theo issues Nan a final chance to change her mind until the next morning. At a ceremony, Nan rejects Jinny, and Richard confronts his mother, announcing his intention to sever ties and move to the US with her. Conchita reveals to him that her father's investment failed and the family has lost their money, but Richard stands by his decision. Jinny faints while climbing the stairs, and Miles reveals to James that she is pregnant, leading him to beat Jinny. Patti affirms to Tracy that she will divorce him given that Nan will be a duchess soon. Mabel questions her engagement to Miles and later comes out to Lizzy, who accepts her. Guy climbs up to Nan's room and reveals he ended his engagement to Lady Hopeleigh; the two proclaim their love and have sex. Jinny reveals to them James' abuse and her pregnancy, and the trio try to escape, intending to leave for South America, but James finds them and returns with Jinny. The next morning, Mabel ends her engagement with Miles and declares her love for Honoria. Outside the chapel, the group stalls the ceremony to help Jinny escape with Guy. Nan marries Theo, with the dowager duchess' knowledge, so she will be able to protect Jinny and Guy from James with her status. Outside, Tracey reveals to Patti that Nan's biological mother has returned.

=== Season 2 (2025) ===
No. overall	No. in series	Title	Directed by	Written by	Original release date
9	1	"The Duchess of Tintagel"	William McGregor & Rachel Leiterman	Katherine Jakeways	18 June 2025
Nan's biological mother is revealed to be Patti's younger sister, Nell. Nan flees from the reception confused and upset over what she has done, and Nell comforts her but maintains the facade that she is merely her and Jinny's aunt. Later, Patti and Nell engage in a heated exchange regarding their past, and Patti again reaffirms her plan to leave Tracy. Lizzy catches the eye of an MP at the reception, which Theo notices. Mabel and Honoria acknowledge that forging a life together is unfamiliar for both of them, but they maintain their commitment. With Lord Brightlingsea's health deteriorating, Dick and Conchita are forced to remain in England, and Conchita looks for ways to recoup some of the family's lost fortune, to the Brightlingsea's chagrin. Nan tries to reason with the Dowager regarding her mixed feelings over her marriage to Theo but is told to remain stoic and dignified. Nan is later confronted by James regarding Jinny's whereabouts, and she admits to being unaware of her sister's location. Patti and Nell make up and leave for America together. In Italy, Jinny and Guy arrive in a remote seaside village, masquerading as husband and wife. At the Black & White ball, Nan makes her debut as the new Duchess of Tintagel, defying tradition by wearing a dazzling red gown.
10	2	"Holy Grail"	Charlie Manton	Katherine Jakeways	25 June 2025
11	3	"Get Her Out"	Charlie Manton	Roanne Bardsley	2 July 2025
12	4	"Ice Cream"	William McGregor	Georgia Christou	9 July 2025
13	5	"A Whole Love"	Rachel Leiterman	Ava Pickett	16 July 2025
14	6	"Every Single Piece of My Heart"	Rachel Leiterman	Dana Fainaru	23 July 2025
15	7	"All Rise"	John Hardwick	Alex Straker	30 July 2025
16	8	"She Knows"	John Hardwick	Katherine Jakeways	6 August 2025

== Production ==
=== Development ===
It was announced in June 2022 that Apple TV+ had ordered the series from the Forge, with Katherine Jakeways set to be head writer and Susanna White attached as lead director. Jakeways and White would also executive-produce the series with Beth Willis and George Faber of the Forge.

=== Casting ===
The cast were included in the series order announcement: Kristine Froseth, Alisha Boe, Josie Totah, Aubri Ibrag, Imogen Waterhouse, and Mia Threapleton would star as the titular buccaneers. In July, Christina Hendricks, Josh Dylan, Barney Fishwick, Guy Remmers, and Matthew Broome were added to the cast. Simone Kirby joined the cast in October as the girls' chaperone.

In December 2023, it was confirmed that the main ensemble would return in the second season. In October 2024, Leighton Meester joined the cast. Greg Wise, Maria Almeida, Grace Ambrose, and Jacob Ifan were added in December.

In February 2026, it was announced that Paul Wesley was joining the cast of the third season, at the same time that filming was reported to be underway in Slovakia.

=== Filming ===
Principal photography for the first season began in March 2022 in Madrid and continued in June in Scotland, with production based at Pyramids Studios in West Lothian; Glasgow doubled as 1870s New York City. Cast and crew were spotted filming around the Glasgow City Chambers in July.

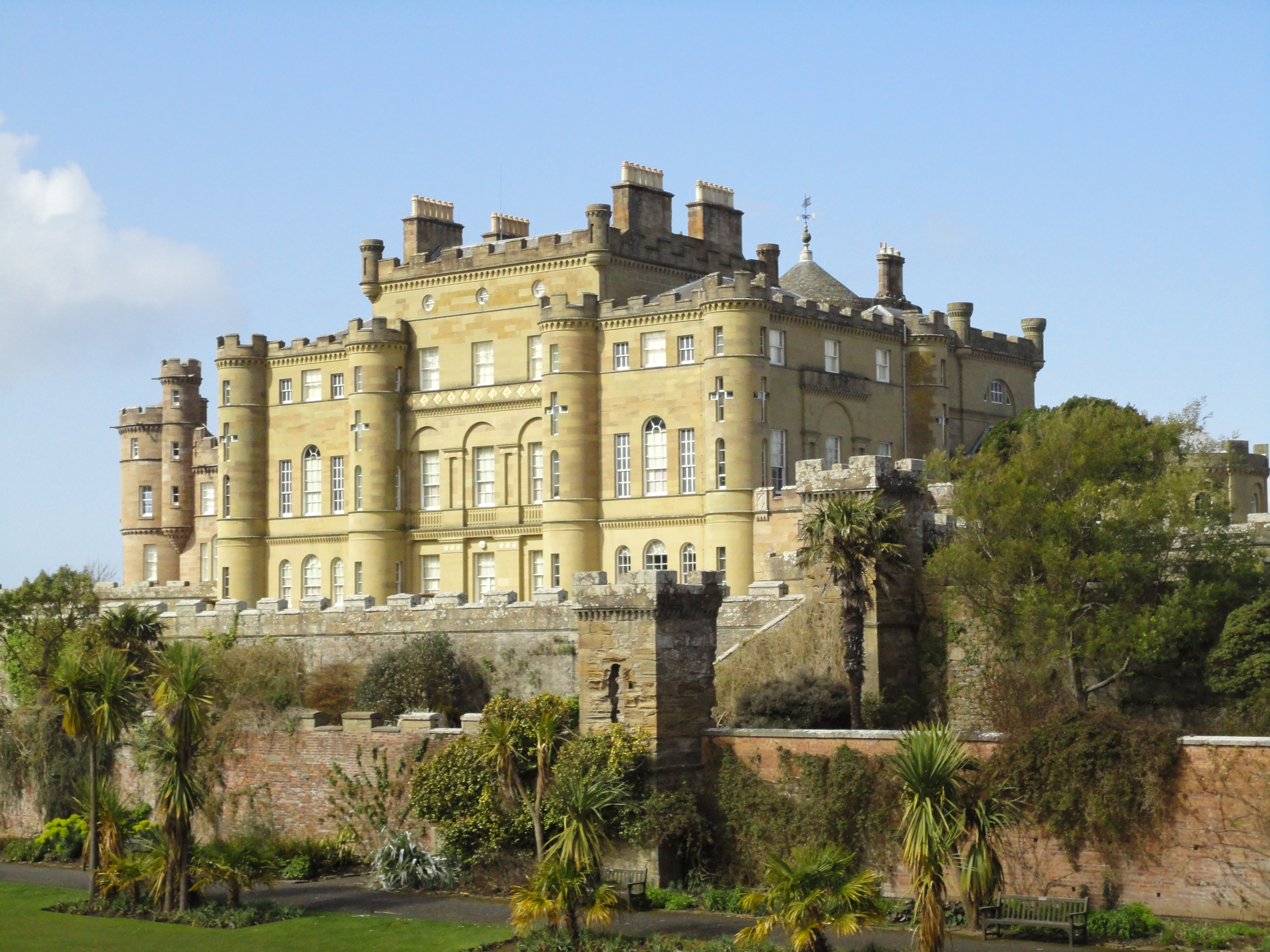
Culzean Castle

Stately homes used as filming locations included Culzean Castle (standing in for part of Tintagel Castle), Newhailes House (Brightlingsea terrace interior), Gosford House (Closson Mansion), Hopetoun House (Tintagel interior and part of Brightlingsea), and Drumlanrig Castle (part of Tintagel Castle). The Educational Institute of Scotland also served as the exterior of the Brightlingsea's Georgian terrace. The Tintagel ball takes place in the University of Glasgow's cloisters. Carolside doubled for Runnymede in Surrey, while Stichill Linn was used for the grounds' waterfall. St Abb's Head doubled for the Cornwall coast, while the beach scene where Nan and Theo meet was shot at Seacliff.

Principal photography for the second season was reportedly underway in Scotland as of May 2024.

== Soundtrack ==
The show's all-female soundtrack was produced by Stella Mozgawa.

=== Track listing ===
The Buccaneers: Season 1 Soundtrack track listing
No.	Title	Performer(s)	Length
1.	"North American Scum" (featuring Miya Folick)	Emily Kokal	5:40
2.	"Let the Games Begin"	Lucius	4:07
3.	"What We Wanna"	Miya Folick	2:17
4.	"Ankhas"	Warpaint	3:31
5.	"Right on Time"	Bully	2:03
6.	"Lifeline"	Sedona	3:07
7.	"Ice Cream"	Lucius	4:22
8.	"Down by Law"	Alison Mosshart	3:16
9.	"Anyway I Look at It"	Emily Kokal	4:35
10.	"These Waves"	Emily Kokal	3:14
11.	"Into the Dark"	Danielle Ponder	5:06
12.	"Lean In"	Breymer	2:31
13.	"Meet Me After Midnight"	Breymer	1:32
14.	"Cedar"	Gracie Abrams	4:12
15.	"Feel Good"	Sharon Van Etten	3:33
16.	"Close to You"	Sharon Van Etten	5:00
Total length:			58:06

The Buccaneers: Season 2 Soundtrack – Disc 1 track listing
No.	Title	Performer(s)	Length
1.	"North American Scum (Chloé Caillet Remix)" (featuring Miya Folick)	Emily Kokal
2.	"Little Secret"	Empress Of	2:38
3.	"Chasing After You"	Kacy Hill
4.	"Featherweight"	Suki Waterhouse
5.	"Can't Forget"	Jade Bird
6.	"Something to Burn"	Madi Diaz
7.	"Miss You to Death"	Holly Humberstone
8.	"Worry"	BEKA
9.	"Never the Same"	Jana Diab
10.	"What Would We Do"	Emily Kokal
11.	"2U"	Emily Kokal

The Buccaneers: Season 2 Soundtrack – Disc 2 track listing
No.	Title	Performer(s)	Length
1.	"Wedding"	AVAWAVES
2.	"Aunt Nell"	AVAWAVES
3.	"Lizzy"	AVAWAVES
4.	"Affairs"	AVAWAVES
5.	"The Institution"	AVAWAVES
6.	"To Have a Voice"	AVAWAVES

== Reception ==
The review aggregator website Rotten Tomatoes reports an approval rating of 76%, with an average rating of 6.30/10, based on 46 reviews. The website's critical consensus reads, "Anachronistic to the max and loving it, The Buccaneers is a feminist and frothy treat for fans of period piece pageantry." Metacritic, which uses a weighted average, assigned the show a score of 70 out of 100, based on 21 critics, indicating "favorable reviews".
