= The Buccaneers =

1938 novel by Edith Wharton

- First edition cover (Appleton & Co.)
- Author: Edith Wharton
- Language: English
- Genre: Drama
- Set in: 1870s
- Publisher: Penguin Books
- Publication date: 1938
- Publication place: United States
- Media type: Print

The Buccaneers is the last novel written by Edith Wharton. The story is set in the 1870s, around the time Wharton was a young girl. It was unfinished at the time of her death in 1937 and published in that form in 1938. Wharton's manuscript ends with Lizzy inviting Nan to a house party, to which Guy Thwarte has also been invited. The book was published in 1938 by Penguin Books in New York. Marion Mainwaring finished the novel, following Wharton's detailed outline, in 1993.

== Plot ==
The story revolves around five wealthy and ambitious American girls, their guardians, and the titled, landed, but impoverished Englishmen who marry them as the girls participate in the London social season. As the novel progresses, the plot follows Nan and her marriage to the Duke of Tintagel.

The novel begins with three socially ambitious families looking for the status needed for their daughters to live successful lives, complete with European titles. The young women's fathers' money is very attractive to European aristocrats to maintain their version of wealth: collections of art, property, and other accoutrements of social status. While some girls live in unhappy marriages, they often take lovers to make their marriages work—or they file for divorce. While these young women were not in the best of situations, with high expectations from the dukes, some fall in love. Nan eventually falls in love with Guy Thwarte.

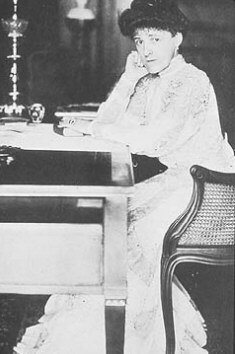
Edith Wharton (1915)

== Reception of incomplete novel ==
Edith Wharton's final novel received positive and negative reactions from critics. It was often referred to by The New York Times as the "unfinished novel". The main questions asked by critics were: "Is this really her legacy?" and "Was there enough left of the book to publish in the first place?" Some of Wharton's close friends, such as her literary executor Galliard Lapsey, stated that the story was brought to its intended conclusion.

The unfinished story also received some positive remarks. According to literary critic May Lamberton Becker, The Buccaneers was one of her greatest works and one of the best works of the period. Lamberton Becker also stated, "To the last, Mrs. Wharton kept faith with her public, even in the novel for whose completion she could not stay. The Buccaneers is complete as far as the story goes, and may be read without the sense of final frustration that attends to so many unfinished novels. By far, the greater part, all indeed but the climax, the conclusion, and the scenes by which these were to be directly approached, are not only in print, but in what amounts to final form. What was to happen in these unwritten chapters her own synopsis—unusually rich in detail and in emotional undercurrent—leaves no manner of doubt".

Time magazine also wrote an editorial of the book in 1938. It begins with "Death last year ended Edith Wharton's work on a novel that might have been her masterpiece. She has written 29 chapters of a book apparently planned to run about 35 chapters. The story had reached its climax; the characters were at a moment in their careers when they were compelled to make irrevocable decisions. While Mrs. Wharton left notes suggesting how she intended to end the novel, she gave no hint of how she intended to solve its moral and esthetic problems".

Additionally, some critics were defensive of Wharton's last work. Christopher Money referred to those who responded negatively to Wharton's last work as a "low-class lot", and respected her humor towards the upper elite. Money even complimented Wharton's literary executor on his "eloquent, but surely unnecessary apology for the publication of this incomplete novel".

== Reception for Marion Mainwaring's 1993 complete version ==
The criticism for Mainwaring's 1993 finished novel was harsh. In The New Yorker, John Updike stated, "we have a text that in no typographical way discriminates between her words and Wharton's, and that asks us to accept this bastardization as a single smooth reading unit." In The New Republic, Andrew Delbanco likened Mainwaring's efforts to an act of "literary necrophilia". In a Boston Globe review, Katherine A. Powers wrote that certain sections of The Buccaneers showcased "Wharton at her finest: subtle figures and tropes, eagle-eyed irony and a pathologist's acuity in matters of class and morality. But there are also sketchiness, lacunae, and a central implausibility, this perhaps the reason she never could complete the work... [Mainwaring's additions] were frankly no help. Under her pen, the narrative loses its ironic torque, the Prince of Wales strolls in, and the story, lobotomized and docile, becomes a blueblood infatuated gush."

Mainwaring's response to these critics was, "The argument that she was a great writer and how dare I? Well, I don't think she was always a great writer, at least not as great as some. I wouldn't have attempted this with a George Eliot or a Jane Austen novel. ...Edith Wharton was not at her stylistic best here; that made it easier for me".

== 1995 miniseries ==
Independently of Mainwaring's completion, screenwriter Maggie Wadey was commissioned to adapt and finish the novel for a television version co-produced by the BBC and American PBS broadcaster WGBH; it was screened on BBC 1 in the UK and in the Masterpiece Theatre series in the United States during 1995. This serial adaptation was directed by Philip Saville and executive-produced by Phillippa Giles.

Wadey's version of The Buccaneers, with the inclusion of homosexuality as well as its romantically dramatic showiness and seemingly "happy ending", received widespread criticism from both the BBC viewing public and Wharton fans and scholars alike. The general protest was that Wadey's development was far too unrealistic and stereotypically "Hollywood" in its closing development and end, as Guy Thwaite and the Duchess, Annabel "Nan", literally go riding off into the sunset to live happily ever after. This is starkly different from the ending of every one of Wharton's previous novels, which all have markedly realistic and distinctly solemn endings for all of their characters and plot lines. Many viewers felt that in using this ending, the BBC was "selling out" to Hollywood.

While Wadey's BBC ending was at the heart of the controversy, both Mainwaring's and Wadey's endings were heavily criticized for their "sensationalism" and perceived lack of "trueness" to Wharton's style of work, and both writers independently made the claims that they sought to romanticize and "Americanize" the story, despite it having been penned by Wharton to explore the intersections and clashes of class, commerce, and marriage in Old and New World cultures and high society. A companion book to the BBC series was published by Viking in 1995 (ISBN 0-670-86645-8). For this book, Angela Mackworth-Young revised and completed the novel based on Maggie Wadey's screenplay.

Cast and characters

- Annabel "Nan" St. George – Carla Gugino
- Virginia "Jinny" St. George – Alison Elliott
- Conchita "Connie" Closson – Mira Sorvino
- Elizabeth "Lizzy" Elmsworth – Rya Kihlstedt
- Mabel "Mab" Elmsworth
- Laura Testvalley, governess – Cherie Lunghi
- Miss Jacqueline March – Connie Booth
- Ushant, the Duke of Trevenick (Julius, Duke of Trevenick) – James Frain
- Guy Thwarte – Greg Wise
- Lord Richard Marable – Ronan Vibert
- Lord Seadown – Mark Tandy
- Hector Robinson – Richard Huw
- Mrs. St. George – Gwen Humble
- Colonel Tracy St. George – Peter Michael Goetz
- Mrs. Closson – Elizabeth Ashley
- Mr. Closson – James Rebhorn
- Teddy de Dios-Santos
- Mrs. Elmsworth – Conchata Ferrell
- Lord Brightlingsea – Dinsdale Landen
- Selina, Lady Brightlingsea – Rosemary Leach
- Blanche, The Dowager Duchess of Tintagel (The Dowager Duchess of Trevenick) – Sheila Hancock
- Sir Helmsley Thwaite – Michael Kitchen
- Lady Idina Churt (Idina Hatton) – Jenny Agutter
- Miles Dawnley – Gresby Nash

== 2023 TV series ==
In June 2022, Apple TV+ announced plans to adapt the novel into a television series starring Kristine Froseth, Alisha Boe, Josie Totah, Aubri Ibrag, Mia Threapleton, and Christina Hendricks. The series premiered on November 8, 2023, on Apple TV+. The season finale was released on December 13, 2023. Season 2 premiered on June 18, 2025.
