= Apostle (film) =

2018 gothic folk horror film by Gareth Evans

- Release poster
- Directed by: Gareth Evans
- Written by: Gareth Evans
- Produced by: Gareth Evans; Ed Talfan; Aram Tertzakian
- Starring: Dan Stevens; Lucy Boynton; Mark Lewis Jones; Bill Milner; Kristine Froseth; Paul Higgins; Michael Sheen
- Cinematography: Matt Flannery
- Edited by: Gareth Evans
- Music by: Fajar Yuskemal; Aria Prayogi
- Production companies: XYZ Films; Severn Screen; One More One Productions
- Distributed by: Netflix
- Release dates: 21 September 2018 (Fantastic Fest); 12 October 2018
- Running time: 129 minutes
- Countries: United States; United Kingdom
- Language: English

Apostle is a 2018 Gothic folk horror film written, directed and edited by Gareth Evans, and starring Dan Stevens, Lucy Boynton, Mark Lewis Jones, Bill Milner, Kristine Froseth, Paul Higgins and Michael Sheen. It had its world premiere at Fantastic Fest in September 2018, and began streaming on Netflix on October 12, 2018. The story follows a Welsh man as he attempts to rescue his sister from an unnamed cult on a remote island. The film received generally positive reviews from critics.

== Plot ==
In 1905, Thomas Richardson travels to a remote Welsh island to rescue his sister, Jennifer, who has been kidnapped and held for ransom by a mysterious cult led by Malcolm Howe. Posing as a convert, Thomas encounters Howe, who founded the cult with two other convicts, Frank and Quinn. They claim that the barren island was rendered fertile through blood sacrifice. Thomas discovers Frank's son Jeremy and Quinn's daughter Ffion sneaking home after a tryst. He forces Jeremy to admit that Jennifer was kidnapped for ransom, as the cult does not have the resources to pay for the continuous animal sacrifices needed to maintain the island's fertility.

One of the newcomers attempts to assassinate Malcolm, but Thomas intervenes and is wounded. The same night, Malcolm parades Jennifer through the village, claiming she will be killed if her co-conspirator does not come forward. Thomas flees from an old woman who chases him, and escapes to a beach cave covered in markings, depicting a deity. Malcolm visits a barn where the old woman, who is in fact the island's deity, is imprisoned in tree roots; he reprimands her for appearing to Thomas before feeding her his blood, causing the vegetation imprisoning her to bloom. Thomas tells Malcolm's daughter Andrea that he was a Christian missionary who was persecuted in Beijing during the Boxer Rebellion for introducing Christianity to China, and lost his faith after his god failed to intervene. She takes him to a shack in a wheat field to hide.

Ffion reveals to Jeremy that she is pregnant, and the pair make plans to elope. Infuriated, Quinn mutilates Ffion in a forced abortion. Jeremy stabs Quinn, who frames Jeremy for Ffion's murder, and uses a "purification" ritual to publicly murder him by hollowing out the back of his head. Quinn calls Malcolm a false prophet and demands that he prove himself by executing Thomas. Frank, enraged by the death of his son, attacks Quinn, enabling Thomas to escape.

Frank and Thomas flee and arrive at the barn where The Goddess is being held. Frank enters, intent on killing The Goddess, but is killed by a masked figure, The Grinder, whom Thomas witnesses force-feeding Jeremy's body to The Goddess. Sneaking past, he finds Jennifer alive but strung up in a sack. As he releases her, he is knocked unconscious by the Grinder. He finds himself tethered to a meat-grinding table by hooks embedded into his hands and legs. He escapes and kills The Grinder.

Quinn reveals to a captive Jennifer and Andrea that he imprisoned The Goddess after he and Malcolm realized her powers and that he plans to repeatedly impregnate them and use their offspring as blood sacrifices. The Goddess shows Thomas her history with the cult, and begs him to set her free; he grants her wish by unexpectedly immolating her. The village also catches fire while villagers flee to boats. Thomas, Andrea, and Jennifer overpower and kill Quinn, with Thomas sustaining heavy stab wounds. He escorts Jennifer and Andrea to the boats before he collapses, bidding Jennifer and Andrea farewell as they escape. His faith now restored, Thomas is discovered by an injured Malcolm. As he bleeds onto the ground, the vegetation around him grows and infuse within his body. His eyes then turn the same shape and color as the goddess's, signifying his rebirth as the new guardian of the island.

== Cast ==
- Dan Stevens as Thomas Richardson, a former missionary who has lost his faith.
- Michael Sheen as Malcolm Howe, the leader of an island cult.
- Mark Lewis Jones as Quinn, Malcolm's second-in-command.
- Paul Higgins as Frank, a founder of the cult.
- Lucy Boynton as Andrea Howe, Malcolm's daughter.
- Bill Milner as Jeremy, Frank's son and Ffion's lover.
- Kristine Froseth as Ffion, Quinn's daughter and Jeremy's lover.
- Elen Rhys as Jennifer Richardson, Thomas' sister who has been kidnapped by Malcolm's cult.
- Sharon Morgan as Her, the cult's goddess.
- Sebastian McCheyne as The Grinder, a bloodied humanoid creature and keeper of Her.
- Lex Lamprey as Townsman Guard.

== Production ==
On November 2, 2016, it was announced that Gareth Evans was working on a new project that he would write and direct. Dan Stevens was confirmed to be cast in the lead role. In March 2017, the film was picked up by Netflix. Later that month, it was announced that Michael Sheen, Lucy Boynton, Bill Milner and Kristine Froseth had joined the cast. Filming started in April 2017. The film was largely shot on a set built at Margam Park in Neath Port Talbot, Wales.

== Release ==
The film premiered at Fantastic Fest in September 2018. It began streaming on Netflix on October 12, 2018.

== Critical reception ==
=== Critical response ===
On review aggregator Rotten Tomatoes, the film has a rating of 79%, based on 73 reviews, with an average rating of 6.7/10. The site's consensus reads, "Apostle resists easy scares in favor of a steady, slow-building descent into dread led by a commanding central performance from Dan Stevens." Metacritic, which uses a weighted average, assigned the film a score of 62 out of 100, based on 19 critics, indicating "generally favorable" reviews. Variety, echoing other reviews, referred to the film as a homage to The Wicker Man. The Hollywood Reporter stated that "while climactic battles are violent, they never really thrill," concluding that "fans of The Raid [Evans' previous film series] should look elsewhere for their thrills." Collider and The A.V. Club gave Apostle more favorable reviews with a B and B minus respectively.

An IndieWire reviewer listed it as one of the "25 Scariest Movies on Netflix" in 2025, calling it a "stellar folk horror effort."

=== Accolades ===
Award	Category	Recipient	Result	Ref.
BAFTA Cymru	Best Actor	Michael Sheen	Nominated	
BAFTA Cymru	Best Costume Design	Jane Spicer	Nominated	
BAFTA Cymru	Best Make-Up & Hair	Clair Williams	Won	
BAFTA Cymru	Best Production Design	Tom Pearce	Nominated	
Fright Meter Awards	Best Actor	Dan Stevens	Nominated	
Fright Meter Awards	Best Supporting Actor	Michael Sheen	Nominated	
Fright Meter Awards	Best Costume Design	Jane Spicer	Nominated	
Fangoria Chainsaw Awards	Best Streaming Premier Film	Apostle	Nominated	
Sitges - Catalonian International Film Festival	Best Film	Apostle	Nominated	
