= Oh, Canada (film) =

2024 film by Paul Schrader

- Theatrical release poster
- Directed by: Paul Schrader
- Screenplay by: Paul Schrader
- Based on: Foregone by Russell Banks
- Produced by: Tiffany Boyle; David Gonzales; Meghan Hanlon; Scott LaStaiti; Luisa Law
- Starring: Richard Gere; Jacob Elordi; Uma Thurman; Victoria Hill; Michael Imperioli; Penelope Mitchell; Kristine Froseth
- Cinematography: Andrew Wonder
- Edited by: Benjamin Rodriguez Jr.
- Music by: Phosphorescent
- Production companies: Foregone Film PSC; Fit Via Vi Film Productions; Lucky 13 Productions; Ottocento Films; SIPUR; Vested Interest
- Distributed by: Kino Lorber
- Release dates: May 17, 2024 (Cannes); December 6, 2024 (United States)
- Running time: 95 minutes
- Country: United States
- Language: English
- Box office: $1.3 million

Oh, Canada is a 2024 American drama film written and directed by Paul Schrader, based on the 2021 novel Foregone by Russell Banks. It stars Richard Gere, Uma Thurman, Michael Imperioli, Jacob Elordi, Victoria Hill, Penelope Mitchell and Kristine Froseth. The film marked the second collaboration between Gere and Schrader after American Gigolo (1980) as well as Schrader's second adaptation of a novel by Banks after 1997's Affliction.

It follows a dying filmmaker (played by Gere in the present and Elordi in flashbacks) sits for a final interview, during which he admits that his status as a progressive icon is built on a foundation of lies and half-truths, and that he has repeatedly used and discarded his family and friends.

The film had its world premiere at the main competition of the 77th Cannes Film Festival on May 17, 2024, where it competed for the Palme d'Or. It was theatrically released in the United States by Kino Lorber on December 6.

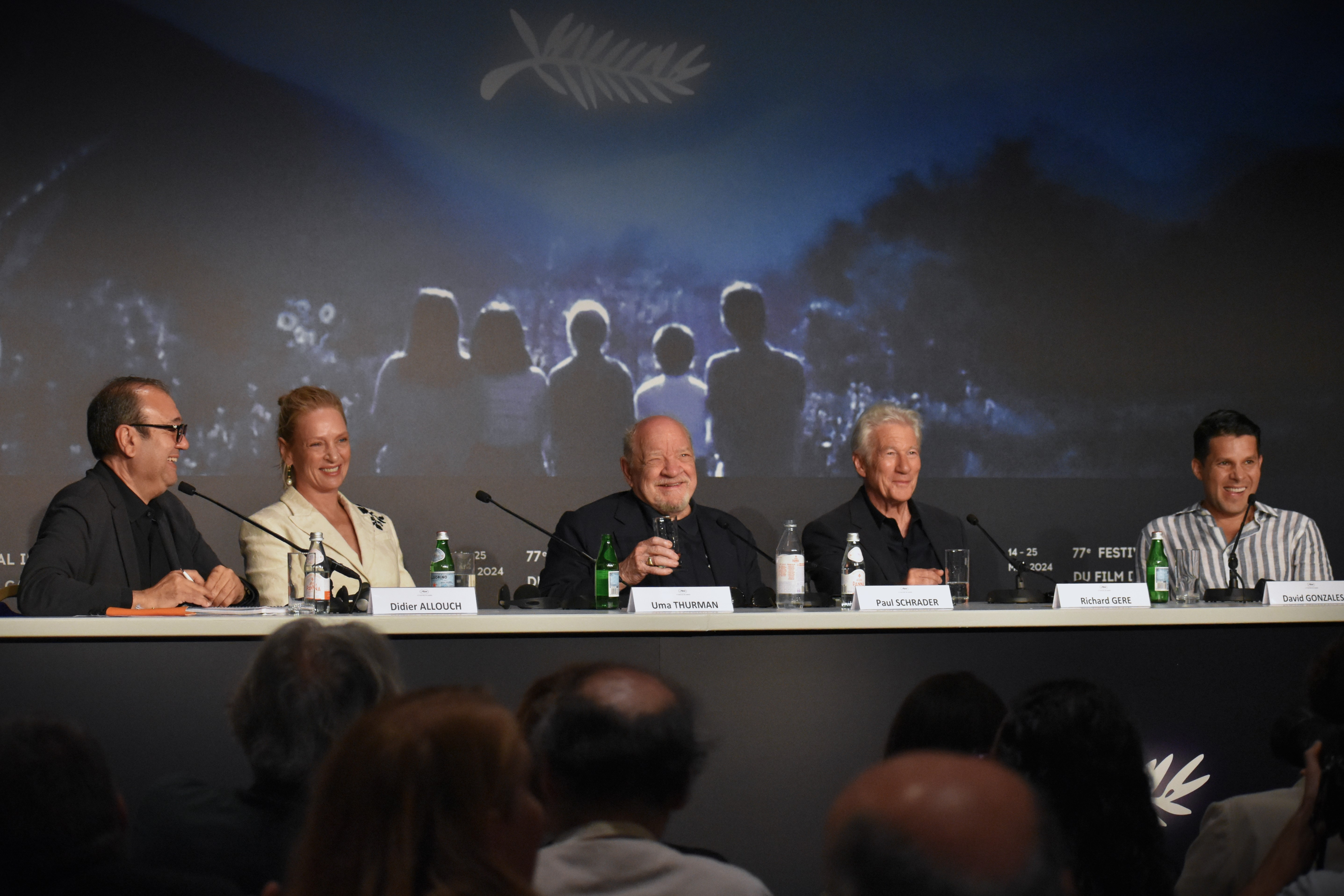
Oh, Canada Press Conference at 2024 Cannes Film Festival

== Plot ==
Filmmaker Leonard "Leo" Fife is dying of cancer. He is a hero to Canadian progressives, who revere his award-winning muckraking documentaries and are fascinated by his life story. According to legend, Leo fled America for Montreal to dodge the Vietnam War draft, and went on a Kerouac-style road trip to Castro's communist Cuba. In his last days, he agrees to sit for a CBC documentary filmed by his former students Malcolm and Diana. Malcolm promises that he is making an admiring retrospective of Leo’s career.

Over the years, Leo has lied to the public many times and abandoned many women. He sees the documentary as an opportunity to confess his sins to his wife Emma, another former student of his. Although Malcolm initially wants to focus on Leo's films, Leo dismissively explains that he became a filmmaker by accident and often drifts into remembering his early life.

Before moving to Canada, Leo, an aspiring novelist, lives in Virginia with his pregnant wife Alicia and son Cornel. His wife's wealthy parents live nearby. Although Alicia prefers to stay in Virginia, he feels stifled by his in-laws’ gentility and traditional values, and hopes a change of scenery will revitalize his writing. As such, although the University of Virginia wants him to stay, he accepts a job at Goddard College in Vermont, hiding the UVA offer from Alicia. To get him to stay in Virginia, his father-in-law offers to train him to run the family business and gives him a week to decide. In the meantime, Leo travels to Vermont to buy a house near the college, which Alicia's parents are paying for.

It becomes clear that Leo abandoned his wife and son when fleeing to Canada. In voiceover, presumably recorded by Malcolm for his documentary, an adult Cornel explains that he did not see his father for 30 years. To save her husband's reputation, Emma tries to stop the interview, explaining that Leo is mentally unstable due to his illness and use of prescription fentanyl. However, Leo and Malcolm—who realizes he has a Leo-style exposé on his hands—both insist on continuing.

Leo recalls more embarrassing moments from his past: he stole from a family friend who gave him a job after he dropped out of college; seduced both Diana and Emma while teaching them; cheated on his first wife while she was pregnant; and lied to the public about visiting Cuba. Emma recalls that when an adult Cornel introduced himself to his father at a film festival, Leo harshly told him that he had no son to avoid embarrassment. Emma met with Cornel privately, but declined his request to stay in touch, preferring to avoid reminders of her husband's past.

Leo revisits his final drive to the Canadian border. He visits his old friend Stanley, and is dismayed to hear that moving to Vermont did not revitalize Stanley’s painting career. That evening, Leo is informed that Alicia miscarried. Even so, he accepts when Stanley's wife Gloria (whom Stanley admits cheating on) sexually propositions him that night.

Emma ends the interview when Leo begins to die. Malcolm's assistant plants a hidden camera to record his last words: "Oh, Canada", after the national anthem.

Leo remembers dodging the draft by pretending to be gay, meaning that he left America for other reasons. His mind flickers to the moment he crossed the Canadian border. His younger self raises his arms to the sun and walks to a new life.

== Cast ==
- Richard Gere as Leonard "Leo" Fife, a Canadian-American filmmaker dying of cancer
  - Jacob Elordi as young Leo
- Uma Thurman as Emma, Leo's third wife and former student
  - Thurman also plays Gloria, the wife of Leo's friend Stanley
- Victoria Hill as Diana, Malcolm's producer and Leo's former student
- Michael Imperioli as Malcolm, a filmmaker interviewing Leo for a documentary, and Leo's former student
- Caroline Dhavernas as Rene, Leo's nurse
- Penelope Mitchell as Sloan, Malcolm's production assistant
  - Mitchell also plays Amy, Leo's first wife
- Kristine Froseth as Alicia, Leo's second wife
- Megan MacKenzie as Amanda, Leo's affair partner
- Zach Shaffer as Cornel Fife, Leo's son with Alicia
- Jake Weary as Stanley, Leo's friend who recruits him to teach at Goddard College

== Production ==
=== Concept ===
Schrader decided to make a movie about mortality after contracting long COVID and being hospitalized three times. He settled on adapting his longtime friend Russell Banks' novel Foregone after Banks fell ill with cancer. He had previously adapted Banks' novel Affliction for the 1997 film of the same name. Banks asked Schrader to title the film Oh, Canada, his original name for the novel.

In addition to Banks' novel, Schrader said that he was influenced by Leo Tolstoy's The Death of Ivan Ilyich (also an influence on Foregone), and agreed with an interviewer that the film bore a resemblance to Andrei Tarkovsky's Mirror. He added that the story of a filmmaker demolishing the myth he had created about himself was partly inspired by his own life; Variety noted that "Schrader delights in mythologizing his own wanton dereliction of self-care". Schrader added that Banks had likewise "exaggerated his own bad behavior for personal reasons".

Schrader modified the character of Leo to be more unsympathetic, as he did not think that Leo's portrayal in the book was especially bad and wanted to "make [the story] a bit more biblical". With Banks' approval, he "ratcheted up the blackness" by "add[ing] a moment where [Leo] turns his back on his own son"; he likened the exchange to his own falling-out with his brother. He described Leo's entry into Canada as "a metaphor for escape, irresponsibility and death".

Schrader explained that he lived through the tumult of the 1960s and that several friends and family members attempted to dodge the draft, like Leo does in the film. He himself had received a draft deferment for health reasons. He stressed that the production design did not rely on '60s tropes, like long hair and bell-bottoms, and that in his memory, "a lot of people look pretty normal."

The film was produced on a low budget and with a compressed shooting schedule. Schrader explained that because of the low budget, "you're not going to make [your investors] rich, but you can make them whole", and that his investors are motivated not by investment returns but by the opportunity to enjoy the glamor of the film industry without excessive financial risk.

=== Casting and filming ===
In December 2023, it was announced that Kristine Froseth, Michael Imperioli, and Uma Thurman had joined the cast of the film. Robert De Niro turned down Gere's part due to the low salary. Although Schrader was unfamiliar with Jacob Elordi, he agreed to cast him after his casting director showed him some of Elordi's scenes in Euphoria.

Arclight Films, which produced Schrader's First Reformed, agreed to finance and represent sales of the movie at the European Film Market.

The production received a SAG-AFTRA exemption and began filming in New York City in September 2023. Filming wrapped in 17 days. A school in Long Island doubled as Leo's home in Montreal, and the Vermont scenes were shot in Dutchess County and Queens. Schrader wrote and shot a new epilogue for the story in which Emma and Cornel visit the ossuary housing Leo's ashes, which he screened at Cannes but eventually cut.

To represent the four time periods in the film, cinematographer Andrew Wonder shot the film in four styles, with distinctive aspect ratios and color palettes. Schrader explained that Leo's present-day interview is shot in color with dark lighting; his trip to Canada is brighter and "blown out à la 'Fat City'"; his memories are shot in black and white; and Cornel's visit to Canada is tinted in "Bergman-esque orange", after Cries and Whispers.

In addition, the film features an anachronistic soundtrack with lo-fi music by Phosphorescent (Matthew Houck). Schrader said that he hired Houck because "I wanted something anti-anthemic" and Houck's style is "officially anti-anthemic"<.ref>Perez, Rodrigo (December 6, 2024). "Paul Schrader Talks 'Oh, Canada,' Reuniting With Richard Gere, Tarantino's 'The Movie Critic' & More". The Playlist.</ref>

== Reception ==
On the review aggregator website Rotten Tomatoes, 66% of 106 critics' reviews are positive. The website's consensus reads: "Anchored by Richard Gere's egoless performance, Oh Canada is a thorny and sometimes muddled memory play that fits solidly into director Paul Schrader's self-reflective filmography." Metacritic, which uses a weighted average, assigned the film a score of 65 out of 100, based on 26 critics, indicating "generally favorable" reviews.
