= Devil's Revenge =

2019 American horror film

- Film poster
- Directed by: Jared Cohn
- Written by: Maurice Hurley; William Shatner
- Starring: William Shatner; Jeri Ryan; Jason Brooks
- Distributed by: Cleopatra Entertainment
- Release date: October 1, 2019
- Running time: 98 minutes
- Country: United States
- Language: English
- Budget: $22,500,000

Devil's Revenge is a 2019 American horror film directed by Jared Cohn and starring Jeri Ryan, William Shatner and Jason Brooks.

== Plot ==
John Brock is a down-on-his-luck archaeologist who returns from an expedition to the caves of rural Kentucky after unsuccessfully trying to locate a mysterious relic that his family has sought for generations. Upon his return, John starts to see dream-like visions of a ferocious bird-like creature from ancient folklore. John soon learns that the cave he came into contact with on his last expedition was indeed the cave that contains the relic and also a portal to Hell and a place of worship for the Occult. John discovers that the only way to stop the increasingly realistic visions is to go back to the cave with his family, find the relic once and for all, and destroy it.

== Cast ==
- Jason Brooks as Sergio
- William Shatner as Hayes
- Jeri Ryan as Susan
- Brendan Wayne as Paul
- Phillip Andre Botello as R.J.
- Ciara Hanna as Dana
- Robert Scott Wilson as Eric

== Production ==
In addition to acting in the film, Shatner co-wrote the screenplay with Maurice Hurley. Nina Chermak Rosenberg was also hired to be the films costume designer.

The film was shot in Louisville, Kentucky.

== Release ==
The film was released via video-on-demand on October 1, 2019. Afterwards, the film was released on DVD and Blu-ray on October 22 that same year.

== Reception ==
Phil Hoad of The Guardian gave the film one star out of five: "No opportunity for deadweight exposition or cornball reversals goes unexplored as William Shatner attempts to destroy an ancient jinxed relic in this bizarre horror-thriller". Bobby LePire of Film Threat gave the film a 9 out of 10.
