= Luka Sabbat =

French-American actor and model

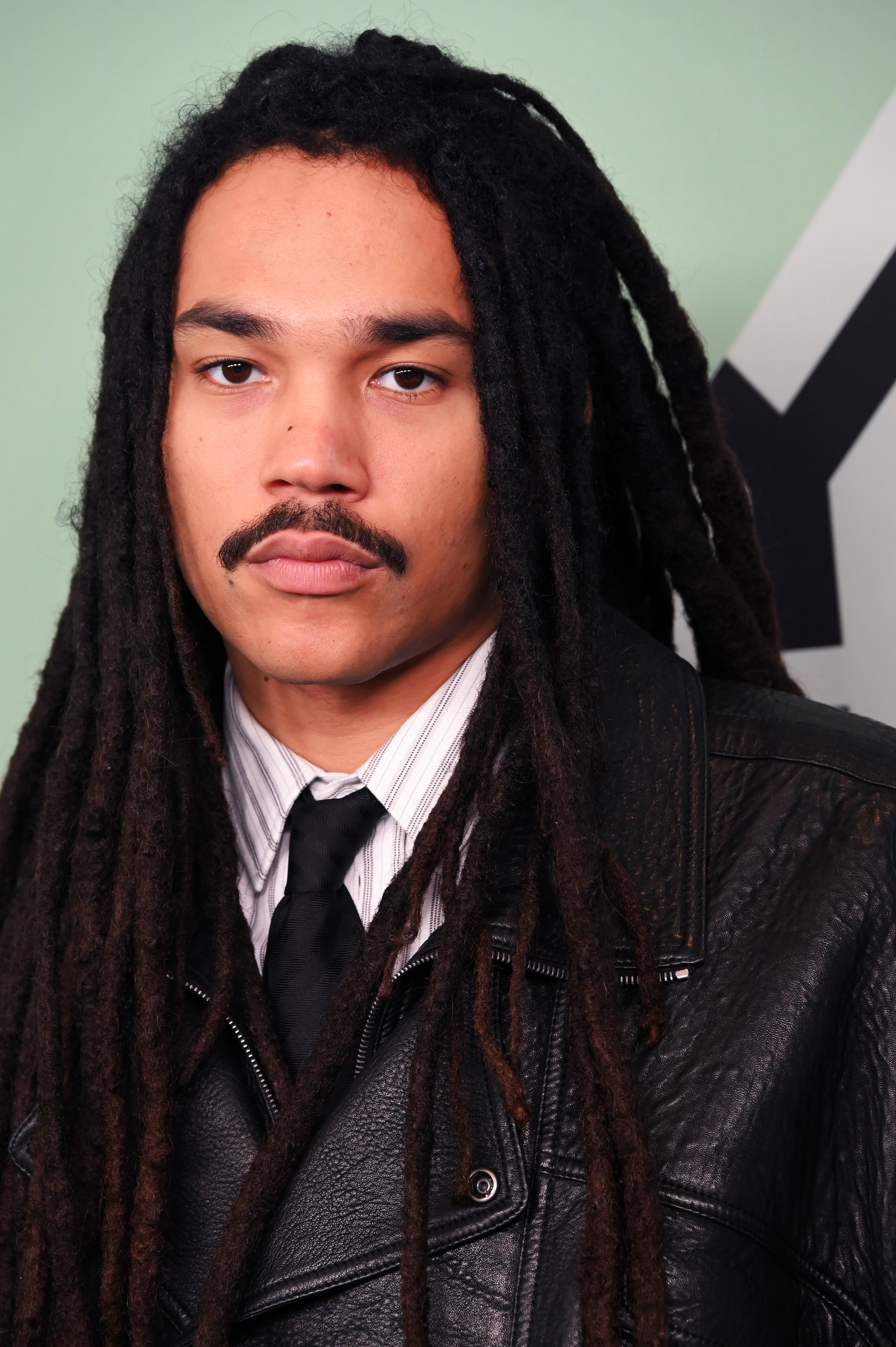
- Sabbat in 2025
- Born: November 26, 1997 (age 28); Lower East Side, New York City, United States
- Occupations: Model; actor
- Years active: 2015-present
- Known for: Grown-ish (2018–2022)

Luka Sabbat (born November 26, 1997) is a French-American actor and model. He is known for his role as Luca Hall in the television series Grown-ish, which he starred in from 2018 to 2022.

== Early life ==
Sabbat was born on the Lower East Side of Manhattan, New York City. His father Clark Sabbat was a designer and immigrant of Haiti, and his mother was a stylist and model booker for John Galliano and Dior.

His family moved to Paris when he was three, and stayed there through most of his teen years.

Sabbat recalls sitting front row at fashion shows from the time he was three years old. Models, such as Lara Stone, would look after him when he was backstage. When he was fifteen, Sabbat was approached by a modeling scout on the streets of New York City. He signed a contract with ReQuest Model Management and received his first campaign within a week. Tom Ford gave Sabbat a tuxedo, which he wore to his high school prom.

Sabbat graduated from Lower Manhattan Arts Academy in 2015. He briefly attended college, but dropped out before the end of the first semester.

== Career ==
In 2015, Sabbat walked in his first show, Yeezy Season One, which was Kanye West's debut collection with Adidas. Sabbat had been introduced to West by Virgil Abloh only a few days prior to the show, when West was still looking for male models.

In 2016, Sabbat walked in the Dolce & Gabbana show alongside his girlfriend at the time, model Adriana Mora. Sabbat and Mora also starred together in a Hugo Boss campaign.

In 2018, Sabbat made his acting debut on the television show Grown-ish, playing the recurring role of Luca Hall. The show's creator, Kenya Barris, bumped into Sabbat at Soho House and created the character based on Sabbat. After a strong fan response to Sabbat's character in the first season, his role was changed from a recurring one to a main one. In August 2018, he was nominated for Choice Breakout TV Star for his role as Luca Hall at the 2018 Teen Choice Awards.

In October 2018, Sabbat was sued by Snap Spectacles for his failure to promote their product on his Instagram account. The lawsuit claimed that in September 2018 Sabbat had agreed to post three Instagram stories and one post to his Instagram feed in which he was wearing the spectacles. They alleged Sabbat had made only one Instagram story and one post to his feed. The lawsuit further alleged that Sabbat was also supposed to be photographed wearing the spectacles during the Milan or Paris Fashion Weeks. The company requested a reimbursement of $45,000 and claimed an additional $45,000 in damages from Sabbat's failure to follow through with the campaign.

By February 2019, Sabbat had over 377,000 followers on Twitter and over 1.6 million followers on Instagram.

In August 2019, Sabbat was nominated for the category of Choice Summer TV Actor in the 2019 Teen Choice Awards for his role in Grown-ish.

== Filmography ==
=== Film ===
Year	Title	Role	Notes
2019	The Dead Don't Die	Zack	
2022	Sharp Stick	Arvin	
2024	The Trainer	Luke	
2025	Father Mother Sister Brother	Billy	

=== Television ===
Year	Title	Role	Notes
2018–2022	Grown-ish	Luca Hall	
