= Scott Cohen (actor) =

American actor (born 1961)

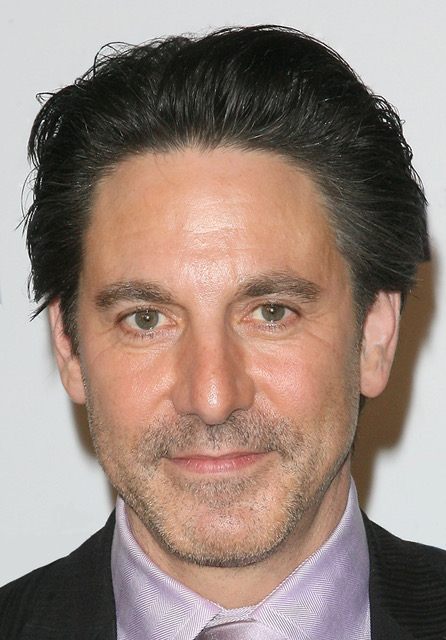
- Cohen in 2011
- Born: December 19, 1961 (age 64); The Bronx, New York City, U.S.
- Education: State University of New York at New Paltz (BA)
- Occupation: Actor
- Years active: 1990–present
- Spouse: Anastasia Traina (m. 1989)
- Children: 1

Scott Cohen (born December 19, 1961) is an American actor best known for his supporting role as Max Medina on the first three seasons of The WB comedy drama series Gilmore Girls (2000–03), as well as his lead roles as Detective Chris Ravell on the NBC legal drama series Law & Order: Trial by Jury (2005–06), Dominic Eugene "Nico" Careles on the USA Network comedy drama series Necessary Roughness (2011–13), Ezra Wolf on the ABC legal drama series The Fix (2019), and Luca Falcone on the HBO crime drama miniseries The Penguin (2024).

He is also known for his roles in films such as The Mambo Kings (1992), Kissing Jessica Stein (2001), Love & Other Drugs, Please Give (both 2010), Anesthesia, James White (both 2015), As You Are (2016), Who We Are Now (2017), Braid, and Write When You Get Work (both 2018).

== Career ==
In 1990, Cohen was offered a breakthrough role in Adrian Lyne's Jacob's Ladder. In the video game Ripper, he portrays protagonist Jake Quinlan. He appeared in the movie Gia with Angelina Jolie, as a parole officer in the Showtime original series Street Time with Rob Morrow, had a recurring role as Det. Harry Denby in the seventh season of NYPD Blue, and was featured in the 2005 NBC series Law & Order: Trial by Jury as Det. Chris Ravell.

In 2000 Cohen had a co-starring role as Wolf in the hit miniseries The 10th Kingdom, where he played a mythical character from a land of fairy tales. He starred opposite Kimberly Williams, John Larroquette, Dianne Wiest, Daniel Lapaine, Ed O'Neill, and Rutger Hauer. The miniseries won many awards, such as the 2000 Primetime Emmy Award for Outstanding Main Title Design and nine OFTA Television Awards for different categories including but not limited to best new theme song, best visual effects, best costume design, best production design, and best mini series with Anne Dudley the award-winning composer.

Also in 2000 Cohen played Max Medina, in the hit TV series Gilmore Girls, as a teacher at Chilton high school where the main character's daughter went to school. Medina became the boyfriend of Lauren Graham's character, Lorelai, in season one and fiancé in season two.

In 2002–2003, he made some appearances on the game show Pyramid, hosted by Donny Osmond. He guest-starred in the premiere episode of the eighth season of Law & Order: Criminal Intent, playing the role of a city politician with a dark family secret and whose daughter is a drug addict involved with a drug dealer boyfriend killed mysteriously in the opening scene.

Cohen played Jack Woolf in the movie The Other Woman with Natalie Portman and Charlie Tahan. He starred in the British thriller Iron Cross. In the film he plays Ronnie, whose father, Joseph, is played by Roy Scheider. Cohen was on USA Network's drama series Necessary Roughness as the fixer, Nico Careles.

Cohen had a role in The Carrie Diaries as Carrie's dad's old friend starting in Season 1 Episode 3. He gives Carrie her internship at his law firm in New York City, and Carrie dates his son. He also courts and eventually marries Larissa, Carrie's boss at Interview magazine.

Cohen starred opposite Hope Davis in the NBC drama Allegiance.

== Filmography ==
=== Film ===
Scott Cohen film credits
Year	Title	Role	Notes	Ref.
1990	Jacob's Ladder	Resident Doctor		
1992	The Mambo Kings	Bernadito		
1993	Sweet Evil	Mike	Video	
1995	Roommates	Attending Intern		
1996	Final Vendetta	Michael Miller		
1996	Vibrations	Simeon	Video	
1997	Private Parts	Friend		
1997	Camp Stories	Schnair		
1997	A Brother's Kiss	Rapist		
1997	Fall	Derick		
1998	Better Living	Larry		
1999	Cross-Eyed	Melville		
2000	King of the Jungle	Officer Norman Turner		
2001	Kissing Jessica Stein	Josh Meyers		
2003	Psychoanalysis Changed My Life	Nick Zurmer	Short film	
2004	Knots	Dave Siegel		
2005	The Circle	Stan		
2005	Confess	Media Executive		
2006	Brother's Shadow	Jake Groden		
2007	Mitch Albom's For One More Day	Len Benetto		
2008	The Understudy	Jonny		
2009	Fortune	Gabriel Leguard		
2009	Freud's Magic Powder	Philipp Freud	Short film	
2009	Winter of Frozen Dreams	Barbara's Lawyer		
2009	The Other Woman	Jack Woolf		
2009	Everybody's Fine	Music Conductor		
2009	Moonlight Serenade	David Volgler	Video	
2009	Iron Cross	Ronnie		
2010	Meet My Boyfriend!!!	Unknown	Short film	
2010	Please Give	Dr. Lerner		
2010	Capture the Flag	Luke Edwards	Short film	
2010	Love & Other Drugs	Ted Goldstein		
2011	I'm Coming Over	Werner	Short film	
2011	Loveless	Ricky		
2011	3 Weeks to Daytona	Chuck Weber		
2012	Get the Gringo	Jackson		
2012	Magic: The Gathering - The Musical	Dark Stranger	Short film	
2013	Louder Than Words	Nick Spano		
2015	To Whom It May Concern	Mike		
2015	Anesthesia	Dr. Laffer		
2015	James White	Barry White		
2016	As You Are	Tom		
2016	Jack of the Red Hearts	Mark Adams		
2017	Who We Are Now	Sam		
2017	Active Adults	Mick		
2018	Write When You Get Work	Guy Brinckerhoff		
2018	Braid	Detective Siegel		
2018	The Week Of	Ron Elliman		
2019	South Mountain	Edgar		
2019	All the Little Things We Kill	Gary Anderson		
2023	The Feeling That the Time for Doing Something Has Passed	Allen		
TBA	Rest and Relaxation	TBA	Post-production	

=== Television ===
Scott Cohen television credits
Year	Title	Role	Notes	Ref.
1994	NYPD Blue	Eddie Reyna	Episode: "Double Abandando"	
1994	One Life to Live	Ray Martino	Unknown episodes	
1995	New York News	Greg Wilson	Episode: "The Using Game"	
1995	The Wharf Rat	Matt Martin	Television film	
1996	Gotti	Gene Gotti	Television film	
1997	Feds	Rod Nesbitt	Episode: "Missing Pieces"	
1997	Law & Order	Eddie Newman	3 episodes	
1997	Oz	FBI Agent Jeremy Goldstein	Episode: "God's Chillin'"	
1997	Dellaventura	Unknown	Episode: "Music of the Night"	
1997	F/X: The Series	Michael Lopez	2 episodes	
1998	Gia	Mike Mansfield	Television film	
1998	New York Undercover	Petrello	Episode: "Mob Street"	
2000	Silent Witness	Soriano	Television film	
2000	Perfect Murder, Perfect Town: JonBenét and the City of Boulder	Steve Thomas	Television film	
2000	The 10th Kingdom	Wolf	Television miniseries; 10 episodes	
2000	NYPD Blue	Detective Harry Denby	Recurring role; 9 episodes	
2000–2003	Gilmore Girls	Max Medina	Recurring role; 13 episodes	
2001	Kiss My Act	Michael True	Television film	
2002	The Practice	Assistant District Attorney Mitchell 'Mitch' Wheeler	2 episodes	
2002–2003	Street Time	James Liberti	Main role; 20 episodes	
2004	The Men's Room	Charlie	4 episodes	
2004	Without a Trace	Bernie Scoggins	Episode: "Malone v. Malone"	
2005	Numb3rs	James Grace	Episode: "Soft Target"	
2005–2006	Law & Order: Trial by Jury	Detective Chris Ravell	Main role; 10 episodes	
2006	Fatal Contact: Bird Flu in America	Governor Mike Newsome	Television film	
2007	Oprah Winfrey Presents: Mitch Albom's For One More Day	Len Benetto	Television film	
2008	Cashmere Mafia	Nicholas Branch	Episode: "Stay with Me"	
2008	The Return of Jezebel James	Marcus Sonti	4 episodes	
2009	Law & Order: Criminal Intent	Neil Hayes-Fitzgerald	Episode: "Playing Dead"	
2009	CSI: NY	Aaron Lesnick	Episode: "Yahrzeit"	
2009	The Amazing Mrs. Novak	Simon Wright	Television film	
2010	The Untitled Michael Jacobs Pilot	Josh	Television pilot	
2010	Castle	Lieutenant Stan Holliwell	Episode: "Den of Thieves"	
2010	Grey's Anatomy	Dr. Tom Evans	Episode 20 (season 6): "Hook, Line and Sinner"	
2010	CSI: Crime Scene Investigation	Aaron Custer	Episode: "Doctor Who"	
2010	The Glades	Senator Donald Chapman	Episode: "Exposed"	
2010	Hawaii Five-0	Roland Lowry	Episode: "Ohana"	
2010	Blue Bloods	Dr. Warren Wakefield	Episode: "Chinatown"	
2011	Justice for Natalee Holloway	John Q. Kelly	Television film	
2011	Curb Your Enthusiasm	Ira	Episode: "Car Periscope"	
2011	Unforgettable	Dr. Sam Barlow	Episode: "Spirited Away"	
2011–2012	Pan Am	Everett Henson	3 episodes	
2011–2013	Necessary Roughness	Dominic Eugene "Nico" Careles	Main role; 38 episodes	
2012	Person of Interest	Inspector Doug Rasmussen	Episode: "Risk"	
2013–2014	The Carrie Diaries	Harlan Silver	10 episodes	
2014	Elementary	Nolan Sharp	Episode: "Corpse De Ballet"	
2015	Allegiance	Mark O'Connor	Main role; 13 episodes	
2016	The Mysteries of Laura	Vince Santiani	Episode: "The Mystery of the End of Watch"	
2016	The Good Wife	Jeffrey Nachmann	Episode: "Unmanned"	
2016–2020	Billions	Pete Decker	4 episodes	
2017	I'm Dying Up Here	Roy Brenner	2 episodes	
2018	Taken	Kasparov	Episode 8 (18, season 2): "Strelochnik"	
2018	The Americans	Glenn Haskard	6 episodes	
2019	The Fix	Ezra Wolf	Main role; 10 episodes	
2019	Bluff City Law	James Marshall	Episode: "25 Years to Life"	
2020	The Bold Type	Miles Shaw	2 episodes	
2021	The Equalizer	Robert Harrington, Sr.	Episode: "It Takes a Village"	
2021–2022	Power Book II: Ghost	Congressman Rick Sweeney	2 episodes	
2022	The Resident	Dr. Robert Porter	3 episodes	
2022	The Marvelous Mrs. Maisel	Solomon Melamid	Episode: "How to Chew Quietly and Influence People"	
2022–2023	East New York	Adam Lustig	4 episodes	
2023	Ancient Empires	Narrator	Voice; 3 episodes	
2024	The Girls on the Bus	Charlie Greene		
2024	The Penguin	Luca Falcone	2 episodes	

=== Video games ===
Year	Title	Role	Reference(s)
1996	Ripper	Jake Quinlan	
