= Kristine Froseth =

Norwegian-American actress (born 1995)

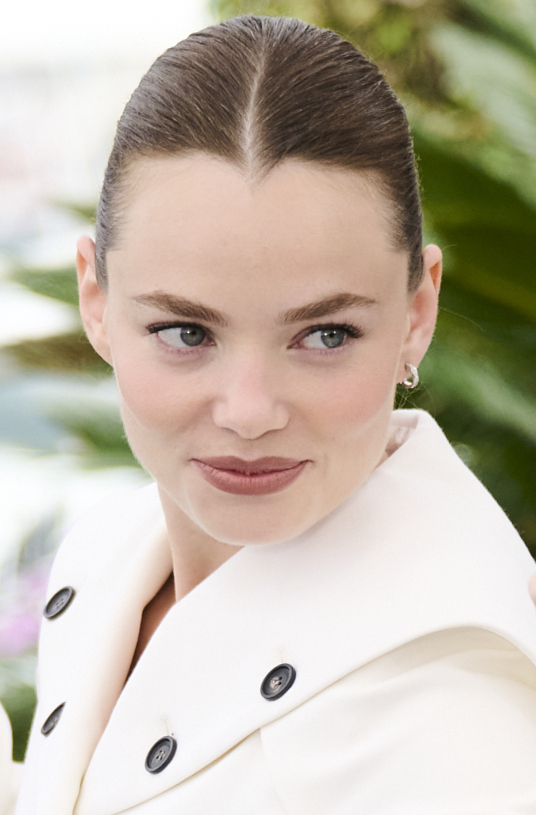
- Froseth in 2026
- Born: September 21, 1995 (age 31); Summit, New Jersey, U.S.
- Occupation: Actress
- Years active: 2013–present

Kristine Froseth (/ˈfroʊsɛθ/; Norwegian: Frøseth; born September 21, 1995) is a Norwegian-American actress. She is known for playing Kelly Aldrich in the Netflix series The Society (2019), Alaska Young in the Hulu series Looking for Alaska (2019), and Nan St. George in the Apple TV+ series The Buccaneers (2023). In 2022, she starred in the Showtime series The First Lady as young Betty Ford.

She is also known for acting in films, taking supporting roles in Sierra Burgess Is a Loser (2018), Apostle (2018), The Assistant (2019), and Oh, Canada (2024) while also taking leading roles in Sharp Stick (2022), and How to Blow Up a Pipeline (2022).

== Early life ==
Froseth was born on September 21, 1995, in Summit, New Jersey, to Norwegian parents. Her childhood was spent traveling back and forth between Oslo and New Jersey due to her father's work.

== Career ==
Froseth started modeling after being discovered on a catwalk audition at Ski Storsenter in Norway, and was also scouted by IMG Models while in New Jersey at a local mall fashion show. She has modeled for brands such as Prada, Armani, Miu Miu and H&M.

Her acting career began when a casting director found her photos and encouraged her to audition for the film adaptation of John Green's novel Looking for Alaska. In 2016, she was cast in the pilot for a potential series adaptation of Let the Right One In. Froseth began her acting career with the 2017 film Rebel in the Rye. In 2018, she starred in two Netflix movies, Sierra Burgess Is a Loser and Apostle, and a Sky miniseries, The Truth About the Harry Quebert Affair.

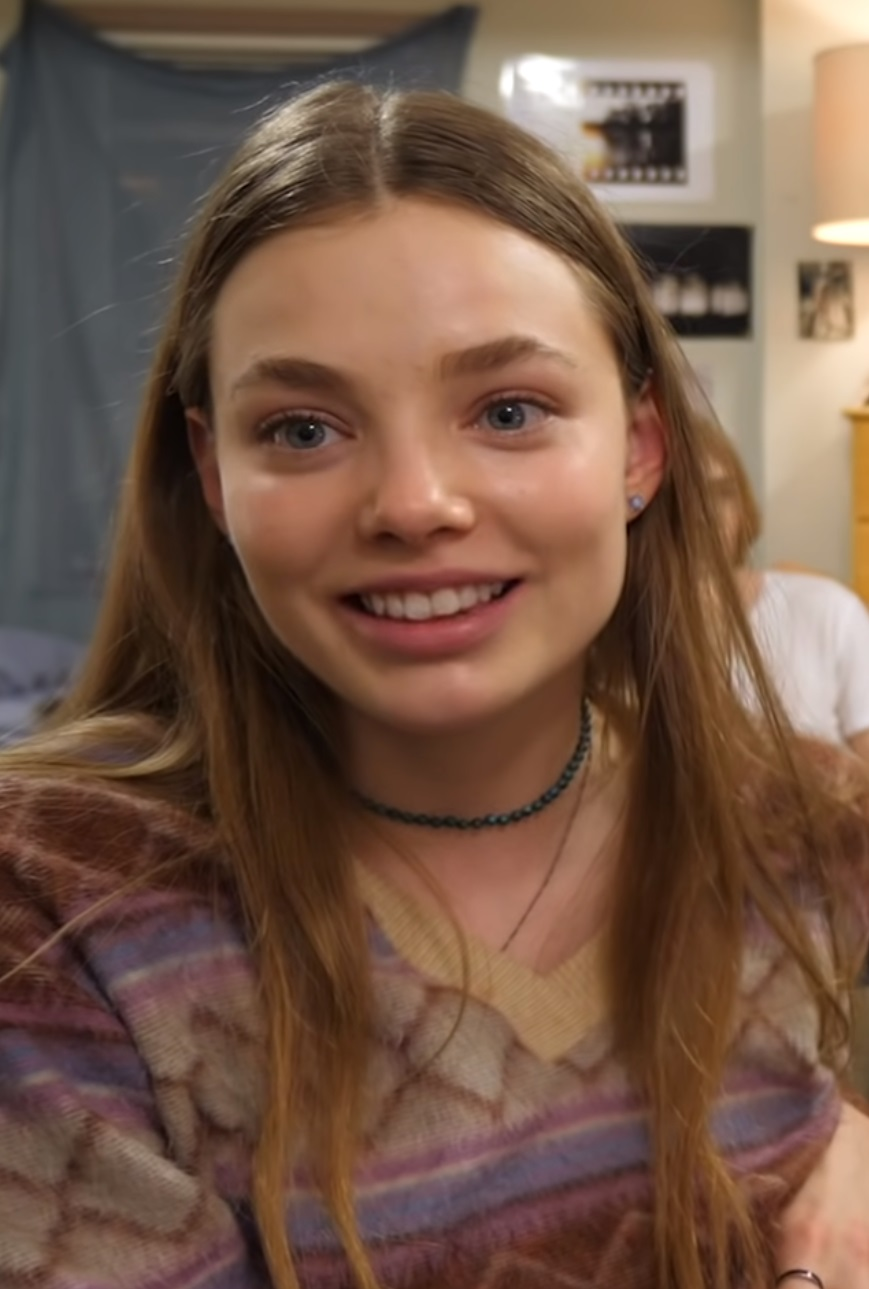
Froseth in 2019

On May 9, 2018, it was announced that Hulu would be adapting the John Green novel Looking for Alaska into an 8-episode miniseries. On October 30, 2018, Green announced that Froseth would be playing Alaska Young, one of the main characters. She stars in the 2021 Amazon Prime Video film Birds of Paradise directed by Sarah Adina Smith.

In June 2022, Froseth was cast to star in Apple TV+'s The Buccaneers. That same year Froseth played the protagonist, Coby Rae Dellum, on the first episode of the second season of the FX on Hulu series American Horror Stories which aired on July 21, 2022. Also in 2022 she starred in the Lena Dunham sex comedy Sharp Stick and Daniel Goldhaber's action-thriller How to Blow Up a Pipeline. She also portrayed a young Betty Ford in the limited series The First Lady (2022).

== Personal life ==
Froseth has been dating her co-star Guy Remmers, whom she met on The Buccaneers set, since 2022.

== Filmography ==
Key
†	Denotes films that have not yet been released

=== Film ===
Year	Title	Role	Notes	Ref.
2017	Rebel in the Rye	Shirley Blaney		
2018	Sierra Burgess Is a Loser	Veronica		
2018	Apostle	Ffion		
2019	Prey	Madeleine		
2019	Low Tide	Mary		
2019	The Assistant	Sienna		
2021	Birds of Paradise	Marine Elise Durand		
2022	Sharp Stick	Sarah Jo		
2022	How to Blow Up a Pipeline	Rowan		
2023	Snorkeling	Jameson		
2024	Desert Road	Clare		
2024	Oh, Canada	Alicia Fife		
2026	Her Private Hell	Hunter		
2026	The Face of Horror	Eleanor		
TBA	Pickleheads †	Mia Presley	Post-production	

=== Television ===
Year	Title	Role	Notes	Ref.
2013	New Face	Herself	Web series	
2016	Junior	Jess	Main role	
2017	Let the Right One In	Eli	Unsold television pilot	
2018	The Truth About the Harry Quebert Affair	Nola Kellergan	Miniseries	
2019	The Society	Kelly	Main role	
2019	Looking for Alaska	Alaska Young	Miniseries	
2020	When the Streetlights Go On	Chrissy Monroe	Miniseries	
2022	The First Lady	Betty Ford (young)	Limited series	
2022	American Horror Stories	Coby Rae Dellum	Episode: "Dollhouse"	
2023–present	The Buccaneers	Nan St. George	Main role	
TBA	The Age of Innocence †	May Welland	Limited series	

=== Theater ===
Year	Production	Role	Venue	Ref.
2025	All Nighter	Darcie	The Newman Mills Theater, MCC Theater	

=== Music videos ===
Year	Title	Role	Artist	Ref.
2016	"False Alarm"	The Girl	The Weeknd	
2016	"Killing Me to Love You"	Girl	Vancouver Sleep Clinic	

== Awards and nominations ==
Year	Award	Category	Work	Result	Ref.
2024	Sitges Film Festival	Best Actress	Desert Road	Won	
