= Braid (film) =

- Theatrical release poster
- Directed by: Mitzi Peirone
- Written by: Mitzi Peirone
- Produced by: Logan Steinhardt; Arielle Elwes
- Starring: Madeline Brewer; Imogen Waterhouse; Sarah Hay; Scott Cohen
- Cinematography: Todd Banhazl
- Edited by: David Gutnik
- Music by: Michael Gatt
- Production companies: Wandering Bard; Somnia Productions
- Distributed by: Blue Fox Entertainment
- Release dates: April 22, 2018 (Tribeca Film Festival); February 1, 2019 (United States)
- Running time: 82 minutes
- Country: United States
- Language: English
- Budget: $1.7 million
- Box office: $80,745

Braid, also known as Dying to Play and Nobody Leaves, is a 2018 American psychological horror-thriller film written and directed by Mitzi Peirone in her feature directorial debut and starring Madeline Brewer, Imogen Waterhouse, Sarah Hay, and Scott Cohen.

== Plot ==
Petula and Tilda are young artists in New York City who make a living as drug dealers. After losing their stash and money while narrowly escaping police, they are given two days to repay their supplier. The two reconnect with their wealthy but mentally unstable childhood friend Daphne, who lives alone in a remote rural mansion, in the hopes of finding a safe in her house that is full of money. The girls rekindle an intricate fantasy game they played as children—one in which Tilda assumes the role of a young girl, Daphne her mother, and Petula a visiting doctor. The game has three rules: everyone must play, no outsiders allowed, and nobody leaves.

Daphne makes Petula do increasingly bizarre things as the game progresses, such as shattering Tilda's kneecap with a hammer and simulating sexual intercourse with Daphne. During a bad drug trip, Tilda recalls an incident from the girls' childhood in which an argument between them led to Daphne being pushed out of their treehouse and landing on her head, resulting in her current fragile, erratic mental state which causes her to believe the game they are playing is real. Later that night, Daphne binds and gags Petula and Tilda, having fully lost herself to the delusion that she is actually their mother.

Daphne is visited by Detective Siegel, who knew all three girls when they were children, after he receives reports of screams coming from her home. Though Daphne's odd behavior makes him suspicious, he leaves after she reminds him that he does not have a search warrant. Daphne later gives Petula clues to the location and code of the safe, and promises to free the girls if she can find it. Petula succeeds and the girls escape, but are pursued by Daphne, who runs Petula over with her car before taking them back to her mansion.

Daphne cuffs Petula to a chair and locks Tilda in a cage, forcing the latter to watch as she gives Petula a Glasgow smile. The next morning, Daphne tells them that the "game" has concluded and that they are free to leave, but also that she believes she has become pregnant from her faux sexual encounter with Petula. Realizing that this gives them new power over her, Petula restarts the game by convincing Daphne that she needs to be taken in for an emergency caesarean section.

Just as the two girls are about to attack an unconscious Daphne with surgical tools, they are stopped by Siegel, but Daphne wakes up and repeatedly stabs him. Tilda gleefully joins her, while Petula initially watches on in horror, but eventually joins the other two in bludgeoning him to death. They bury his body in Daphne's yard before all three women return to living in the mansion and playing the game, their scars from the injuries inflicted by Daphne having miraculously disappeared.

As Petula grows increasingly wary of her surroundings, it is eventually revealed that the entire film has taken place within Daphne's mansion—every event that occurred up until this point was merely a part of the game, which Tilda is in on as well—and that Petula has tried to escape several times, only to be punished each time by having her arms burned. This "round" of the game concludes when all three women pretend to commit suicide, only to begin again. Daphne is shown as an old woman in a dilapidated house, suggesting that the girls have been playing for many years.

== Cast ==
- Madeline Brewer as Daphne Peters/Mother
  - Zoe Feigelson as young Daphne
- Imogen Waterhouse as Petula Thames/Doctor
  - Dhoni Middleton as young Petula
- Sarah Hay as Tilda Darlings/Daughter
  - Tai Lyn Sandhu as young Tilda
- Scott Cohen as Detective Siegel
- Rob Leo Roy as the train conductor
- Brad Calcaterra as a homeless man

== Production ==
Peirone wrote Braid while working as a model in New York City. She worked with Joseph Lubin of cryptocurrency company Cosensys to crowdfund Braid via Ethereum, raising $1.7 million.

Braid was filmed on 25 days over a five-week period. Post production took six months.

== Release ==
Braid premiered at the 2018 Tribeca Film Festival. It had a limited theatrical release in early 2019 while also available on video-on-demand.

== Reception ==
On the review aggregator website Rotten Tomatoes, 86% of 22 critics' reviews are positive. Metacritic, which uses a weighted average, assigned the film a score of 60 out of 100, based on 6 critics, indicating "mixed or average" reviews.

Katie Walsh of the Los Angeles Times lauded the film for its cinematography and visual style as well as for its willingness to explore darker aspects of female friendship, describing it as a "uniquely feminine horror film". Glenn Kenny of The New York Times considered the film "a bitter parable on failing to chase childhood dreams". Matt Zoller Seitz of RogerEbert.com gave it 3.5 out of 4 stars, remarking that he "came away feeling that I'd seen, if not a major film, then a film by major talents".
