= Sharp Stick =

2022 film by Lena Dunham

- Theatrical release poster
- Directed by: Lena Dunham
- Written by: Lena Dunham
- Produced by: Lena Dunham; Michael P. Cohen; Kevin Turen; Katia Washington
- Starring: Kristine Froseth; Jon Bernthal; Luka Sabbat; Scott Speedman; Lena Dunham; Ebon Moss-Bachrach; Taylour Paige; Jennifer Jason Leigh
- Cinematography: Ashley Connor
- Edited by: Catrin Hedström
- Music by: Luis Felber; Matt Allchin
- Production companies: FilmNation Entertainment; Good Thing Going
- Distributed by: Utopia
- Release dates: January 22, 2022 (Sundance); July 29, 2022 (United States)
- Running time: 96 minutes
- Country: United States
- Language: English
- Box office: $68,598

Sharp Stick is a 2022 American sex comedy film written, produced, and directed by Lena Dunham. It stars Kristine Froseth, Jon Bernthal, Luka Sabbat, Scott Speedman, Dunham, Ebon Moss-Bachrach, Taylour Paige, and Jennifer Jason Leigh. The film follows a naive, sexually inexperienced 26-year-old woman (Froseth) who begins an affair with her older, married employer (Bernthal) and subsequently starts to explore her sexuality.

The film premiered at the Sundance Film Festival on January 22, 2022, and was released theatrically in the United States on July 29, 2022, by Utopia. It received mixed reviews from critics.

== Plot ==
In Los Angeles, naive 26-year-old Sarah Jo works as a babysitter for Josh and his pregnant wife Heather, whose son Zach has Down syndrome. Sarah Jo lives with her single mother, Marilyn, and adopted sister, Treina. Marilyn has had many husbands and one-night stands, and has a somewhat pessimistic view on love (and men in general). During a discussion about love and male attraction, Marilyn advises her daughters to ask a man she admires, "Do you find me beautiful?"

The next day, while they are alone in the family's laundry room, Sarah Jo asks Josh if he finds her beautiful. He becomes flustered, and she lifts up her dress to reveal a scar above her vagina, explaining that she had an emergency radical hysterectomy at age 15 which caused her to experience menopause by age 17. Sarah Jo tells Josh that she is a virgin, and he responds that she would not want to lose her virginity to him. After some awkward rambling from Sarah Jo, Josh asks if he can kiss her. After they kiss, Josh performs cunnilingus on Sarah Jo and takes her virginity. He ejaculates quickly and becomes embarrassed. Sarah Jo reassures him, and he fingers her, which she enjoys.

The next day, Sarah Jo returns to work and sneaks up on Josh in the attic. He tells her that they cannot have sex again, but she arouses him by lifting up her dress, and they have sex again.

Josh takes Sarah Jo on a weekend getaway to the countryside, where they stay in a cabin while lying about their whereabouts: Josh claims to have a commitment with a friend, while Sarah Jo blames her absence on a family emergency. During the trip, Sarah Jo and Josh consume hallucinogenic mushrooms and smoke marijuana. They have sex constantly and watch pornography together. Josh gives Sarah Jo a necklace. Returning home, Sarah Jo continues to watch pornography. She becomes fascinated by a pornographic actor named Vance Leroy, who frequently compliments and encourages his onscreen co-stars.

When Sarah Jo returns to work, Heather's water breaks and she goes into labor. Sarah Jo calls Josh and leans down to comfort Heather, who notices Sarah Jo's necklace. When Josh arrives, Heather demands that she be taken to the hospital by an ambulance. Josh, realizing that the affair has been discovered, breaks down and insists that Sarah Jo means nothing to him. It is revealed that he has cheated many times, even once trying to flee the country with a fling. Josh angrily orders Sarah Jo to leave.

Heartbroken, Sarah Jo writes a letter to Vance, mentioning the fact that they both have scars and her belief that her limited sexual skills render her incapable of being loved. She creates an alphabetical checklist of sex acts she wants to try and wants to avoid, including "anal" (try), "blowjob" (try), and "necrophilia" (avoid/not interested). Excited to complete her checklist, she engages in a series of casual sexual encounters, writing to Vance about her sexual exploits. One fling, Arvin, works as an assistant in pornography and promises to deliver her letter to Vance.

As Josh and Heather are going out with their children one day, Sarah Jo surprises them in their driveway, telling Josh all the sex acts she has experimented with recently and ultimately running off. Later, Vance responds to her letter with a video that Arvin brings to her; Vance encourages her to stop trying to please everyone else and start focusing on her own pleasure. She takes a job looking after a girl who has cerebral palsy. One night, she invites Arvin back to hang out, and they have sex.

== Cast ==
- Kristine Froseth as Sarah Jo
- Jon Bernthal as Josh
- Luka Sabbat as Arvin, a pornography assistant
- Scott Speedman as Vance Leroy
- Lena Dunham as Heather
- Ebon Moss-Bachrach as Yuli
- Taylour Paige as Treina Jo, Sara's adoptive older sister
- Jennifer Jason Leigh as Marilyn Jo, Sarah's single mother
- Janicza Bravo as Mercedes
- Tommy Dorfman as Tali

== Production ==
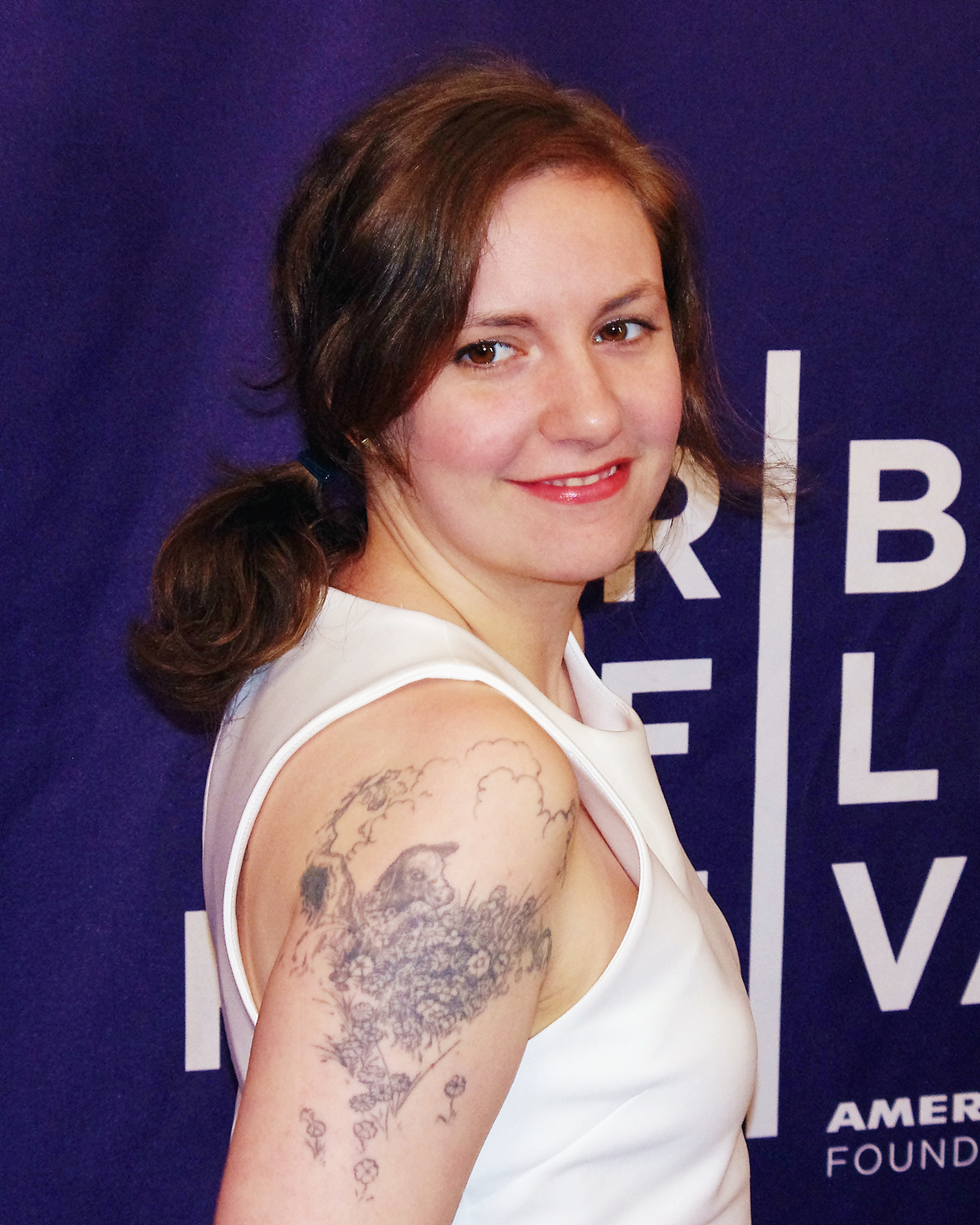
Sharp Stick is the second feature film to be directed by Lena Dunham (pictured).

In April 2020, Lena Dunham moved from London to Silver Lake, Los Angeles, in the midst of the COVID-19 pandemic. She passed the time watching a number of films from the 1960s and 1970s, including Belle de Jour, A Woman Under the Influence, Remember My Name, and An Unmarried Woman. The films, as well as the impact of a hysterectomy, motivated Dunham to write, direct, and star in Sharp Stick. She described the film's impact on her by saying, "It was about processing my life. And then, obviously, it becomes about the characters — and not about you at all." Dunham has also stated that she wanted to create a film that depicted a young woman's complicated sexual awakening without chastising or punishing her. In a director's statement to The Washington Post, she noted double standards in on-screen portrayals of men and women's coming-of-age: "Men get Alfie – the freewheeling Brit with a theme song and a remake. Women get Repulsion." Dunham has likened Sharp Stick to a "sexual fable", and many critics have made similar comparisons to fables or fairy tales.

After receiving the script, Jon Bernthal and Jennifer Jason Leigh were immediately on board to star. Taylour Paige, however, was initially hesitant with joining the cast: "If I'm being honest. I was like, 'Don't you think this character was written as a white person?" Dunham convinced Paige to star by telling her that she had written the part with her in mind.

With an all-female production crew, filming took place in secret in Atwater Village and Eagle Rock, Los Angeles, in early 2021. According to lead actress Kristine Froseth, "There was a good energy all around. We had an amazing intimacy coordinator. Everything was choreographed—no surprises." In March 2021, the film was presented to buyers at the 71st Berlin International Film Festival. In August 2021, Tommy Dorfman was confirmed to star. Dunham's husband Luis Felber composed the musical score.

=== Amy Gravino controversy ===
Ahead of the film's premiere at Sundance, Amy Gravino, an autistic self-advocate and sex educator, posted a Twitter thread alleging that she was approached to be a consultant on Sharp Stick, but was subsequently "ghosted" by Lena Dunham and her team before she could meet with Dunham in person. In a Variety article covering the situation, Gravino claimed that, during the film's development process, Kristine Froseth had blindly approached her business manager after coming across a TED Talk Gravino gave in 2016. According to Gravino, Froseth had come to the conclusion that, though the script never directly indicated as such, Sarah Jo, her character in the film, showed several characteristics that suggested she was autistic. Gravino, who was grateful to accept a paying job as a consultant, reviewed the script and concurred with Froseth's analysis. Gravino also claimed in the Variety piece that Lena Dunham had done research on her work and was excited to meet with her. However, according to the film's producers, Dunham rejected Froseth's suggestion to hire Gravino as a consultant, and clarified to Froseth that she had never intended to depict Sarah Jo as autistic.

In the same article, an unnamed spokesperson for the film responded to the claims with a formal statement, which read in part, "Sarah Jo was never written nor imagined as a neurodivergent woman. Nothing about Sarah Jo was coded to suggest or convey neurodivergence." However, Gravino countered this response by stating, "You can't just say the character isn't going to be neurodiverse; the coding is still there and it comes across that way in the writing and acting choices, even though it's not explicitly stated." She also criticized the "infantilization" of Sarah Jo in the film, though the film's producers claimed that her childlike characterization was developed to reflect the trauma she endured, rather than to indicate that she was autistic.

== Release ==
Sharp Stick premiered virtually at the Sundance Film Festival on January 22, 2022. In an interview, Dunham said, "There are many greater tragedies than me not getting to see my movie premiere but I was so excited for my cast to get to see it together. We did it on such a small scale, and everyone really brought everything to it. It was such a harkening back to how I started. But we're planning a Zoom party. I guess people Zoomed into my wedding—and they'll Zoom into my premiere." In February 2022, Utopia acquired US distribution rights to the film. The film opened in theaters in New York City and Los Angeles on July 29, 2022, followed by a nationwide release on August 5. It was then released on digital platforms on August 16, 2022.

== Reception ==
On the review aggregator website Rotten Tomatoes, 49% of 102 critics' reviews are positive, with an average rating of 5/10. The website's consensus reads: "A series of promising ideas lost in scattershot execution, Sharp Stick stands as a disappointing setback for writer-director Lena Dunham." Metacritic, which uses a weighted average, assigned the film a score of 53 out of 100, based on 29 critics, indicating "mixed or average" reviews.

In a Sundance review for Time magazine, Stephanie Zacharek praised Lena Dunham's willingness to depict a woman's messy, flawed sexual experiences, writing, "This is a film made with tenderness, more an exploration than a definitive statement, and a reminder that awkward sex isn't necessarily bad sex: if anything, it's the ultimate proof of our bewildering, imperfect humanness." Zacharek also praised the sincerity of the film in its depiction of finding love in "a world where the Internet is better at providing the illusion of interconnectedness than it is at actually connecting us". For RogerEbert.com, Tomris Laffly awarded Sharp Stick three out of four stars, writing that Dunham "unearths a refreshing amount of humor, honesty, and sincerity" in the film. Laffly also described Kristine Froseth's lead performance as "extraordinary".

In The New Yorker, Richard Brody complimented the detail and perceptiveness with which Dunham fashioned the film's sex scenes, but complained that "the parts of the film involving Sarah Jo's quest of sexual experience are rushed, breezed by, diminished—as is the interpersonal, emotional part that inevitably comes into play". For The Washington Post, Ann Hornaday praised the film's "candor" and sense of humor, but criticized Sarah Jo's characterization, describing her as "a naif so innocent and so unworldly that she feels less like a fully realized human than a symbol".

Hornaday's sentiment was echoed by several negative reviews of Sharp Stick. In The Hollywood Reporter, Jourdain Searles questioned the reasoning behind Sarah Jo's "troubling" characterization:

What is the significance of Sarah Jo being this way? Yes, she's sexually repressed, but how can she be this naive considering the sexual openness of her mother and sister? How did she manage to glean nothing from her 26 years on Earth? It doesn't help matters that Froseth — who was roughly the age of her character at the time of filming — looks much younger than she is, and the costume choices push her uncomfortably into fetish object territory.

Adrian Horton of The Guardian gave the film two out of five stars, stating that the film's more "interesting, immersive material" becomes "torpedoed by Dunham's decision, refracted by Froseth's odd performance, to write Sarah Jo as more sexual alien than curious person". In The New York Times, Amy Nicholson described scenes involving Sarah Jo's sexual experimentation as "too humorless for satire and too artificial to support the film's eventual, deluded attempt to shift into a somewhat sincere coming-of-age tale". Dana Stevens of Slate referred to such scenes "disturbing", writing, "The wide-eyed enthusiasm with which Sarah Jo approaches this project is meant, I think, to be whimsically endearing; instead, I worried for her safety every time a stranger appeared at the door." Stevens also criticized the film's approach to contrasting Sarah Jo with her adopted sister, the "twerking, boy-crazy" Treina, played by Taylour Paige, calling their dynamic "a pure story contrivance—and one that, given the fact Sarah Jo is white and Treina black, carries with it racial implications that the script barrels obliviously past".

Additionally, for InsideHook, Charles Bramesco scrutinized the "traditionalism" of Dunham's decision to write a sexually adventurous character who ultimately ends up "back into the arms of the one genuine date she actually made a connection with".
