= Guy Remmers =

English actor

- Born: 2 June 1995 (age 31); Bristol, England
- Occupation: Actor
- Years active: 2012–present

Guy Remmers (born 2 June 1995) is an English actor. He began his career in theatre. He is known for his role in the Apple TV+ period drama The Buccaneers (2023–2024).

== Early life ==
Remmers was born in Bristol to a New Zealand-born father and a Welsh mother. He had a creative upbringing, surrounded by the city's garage and house music scene; his older brothers were DJs, as were several of his friends. Remmers attended Fairfield High School, where he took part in school productions and became inspired by his drama teacher. At age 16, he was excluded from school with only a drama GCSE to his name after difficulties he attributed to struggling with dyslexia. He joined Bristol Old Vic's Young Company.

== Career ==
At the age of 17, Remmers made his professional stage debut as Kol in The Grandfathers at the Bristol Old Vic in 2012, which transferred to the National Theatre in London. He subsequently found an acting agent. He was scouted to model while at Bristol's The Love Inn and turned his focus towards that for the next few years, landing gigs in Milan, Paris, and London. In 2017, Remmers was named one of London's up-and-coming models by Da Man. He appeared in the 2020 short film Lessons opposite Ashley Byam.

Remmers made his television debut when he was cast as Theo, Duke of Tintagel in the 2023 Apple TV+ period drama The Buccaneers, based on Edith Wharton's novel of the same title. To prepare for the role, Remmers took up painting and worked with movement coach Toby Sedgwick.

Remmers is signed with IMG Models. In 2024, he joined Jimmy Choo's spring men's campaign. In 2025, Remmers walked for Burberry's 2025 men's winter collection.

== Personal life ==
Remmers is dating his co-star Kristine Froseth, whom he met whilst filming The Buccaneers, from 2022. As of 2023, Remmers is based in Hackney Wick. His hobbies include table tennis and swimming.

== Filmography ==
=== Stage ===
| Year | Title | Role | Notes | Ref. |
|---|---|---|---|---|
| 2012 | The Grandfathers | Kol | Debut | |

=== Television ===
| Year | Title | Role | Notes | Ref. |
|---|---|---|---|---|
| 2023 - Present | The Buccaneers | Theodore "Theo" Ushant, 6th Duke of Tintagel | Main role; 16 episodes | |
