= Saint Clare (film) =

- Theatrical release poster
- Directed by: Mitzi Peirone
- Written by: Mitzi Peirone; Guinevere Turner
- Based on: Clare At 16 by Don Roff
- Produced by: David Chackler; Arielle Elwes; Cassin Elwes; Thor Bradwell; Joel Michaely; Don Roff
- Starring: Bella Thorne; Rebecca De Mornay; Ryan Phillippe; Frank Whaley
- Cinematography: Luka Bazeli
- Edited by: Patrick Sanchez Smith
- Music by: Zola Jesus
- Distributed by: Quiver Distribution
- Release dates: July 12, 2024 (Taormina Film Festival); July 18, 2025 (United States)
- Running time: 93 minutes
- Country: United States
- Language: English

Saint Clare is a 2024 American thriller film written by Mitzi Peirone and Guinevere Turner, directed by Peirone and starring Bella Thorne, Rebecca De Mornay, Ryan Phillippe, and Frank Whaley. It is based on the novel Clare at 16 by Don Roff.

== Premise ==
Clare Bleecker appears to be a normal student, an animal lover and devout vegan living with her grandmother, but underneath her reserved appearance lives a sociopath with dissociative identity disorder.

== Cast ==
- Bella Thorne as Clare Bleecker
- Ryan Phillippe as Timmons
- Rebecca De Mornay as Gigi Newberry
- Frank Whaley as Mailman Bob
- Bart Johnson as Joe and Randall
- Dylan Flashner as Wade
- Jan Luis Castellanos as Truman

== Production ==
In January 2019, Deadline reported that Madelaine Petsch would play the titular character and also serve as an executive producer on the film. However, in May 2022, Bella Thorne was announced to replace Petsch in the lead role after she signed on to star in The Strangers Trilogy films, causing her to drop out of the project.

According to Peirone, the film was shot in 15 days for scheduling reasons. The film was fully storyboarded and the production team averaged 65 setups a day.

In August 2022, it was announced that the film was in post-production and had been re-titled to Saint Clare.

== Release ==
On June 4, 2025, Quiver Distribution acquired the film distribution rights, and released the film in select theaters and on demand on July 18, 2025.

== Reception ==
On the review aggregator website Rotten Tomatoes, 32% of 31 critics' reviews are positive. On Metacritic, the film has a weighted average score of 39 out of 100 based on 6 critics, which the site labels as "generally unfavorable" reviews.
