= Mitzi Peirone =

Italian director

- Born: 1991-2 (age 32–33); Turin, Italy
- Education: American Academy of Dramatic Arts
- Occupation: Director

Mitzi Peirone (born 1991–2) is an Italian filmmaker. She is known for directing the films Braid (2018) and Saint Clare (2024).

== Early life ==
Peirone was born and raised in Turin, Italy.

She moved to the United States at 19 to attend the American Academy of Dramatic Arts, where she studied screenwriting. According to Peirone, at this time, she "barely spoke English."

== Career ==
At 22, Peirone began working as an actress and model in New York City. She began raising money for a film she was meant to star in, but after rejecting a romantic advance from the director, found herself "cut out" of the deal. Her modeling agency also lost her visa, leaving her unable to leave the United States.

This situation served as inspiration for what would become her feature directorial debut, Braid, which she began writing during this time.

Not having the connections to secure studio financing, Peirone ultimately struck a deal with Consensys CEO Joseph Lubin to crowdfund the film using cryptocurrency, ultimately raising $1.7 million.

Braid was shot over five weeks in 2017 and was in post production for six months, ultimately premiering in April 2018 at the Tribeca Film Festival. It received mixed-to-positive reviews, with The New York Times calling Peirone's direction "virtuosic," Slashfilm calling it a "stimulating debut," and RogerEbert.com calling it a "film by major talents.

In 2020, Arielle Elwes, who produced Braid, approached Peirone, stuck in Italy due to the COVID-19 pandemic, with the book Clare at Sixteen. A draft of the script was written by Guinevere Turner in 2021, and Peirone rewrote it with lead actress Bella Thorne in mind. This script eventually became Peirone's next film, Saint Clare. Due to scheduling conflicts, the film was shot in just 15 days.

Saint Clare premiered at the 2024 Taormina Film Festival in Peirone's native Italy and was acquired by Quiver Distribution, premiering on demand on July 18, 2025. The film received mixed reviews, with publications like Variety praising Peirone's "assertive directorial vision," while decrying her "over-busy style," though others found Peirone's direction murky and confusing.

== Filmography ==
Year	Title	Notes
2018	Braid	Feature directorial debut.
2024	Saint Clare	
