= Rosamund Sutherland =

British mathematician (1947–2019)

Rosamund Sutherland (née Hatfield, 1947–2019) was a British mathematics educator. She was a professor emeritus at the University of Bristol, and the former head of the school of education at Bristol.

== Education and career ==
Sutherland was born in Birmingham; her mother taught geography and her father was a physicist. The family moved to south Wales when she was young, and after attending Haberdashers' Monmouth School for Girls she became a student at the University of Bristol, where she met and married her husband, mechanical and biomedical engineer Ian Sutherland.

She worked briefly as a computer programmer, and then as a researcher at the University of Bristol while her husband completed his doctorate. After she and her family moved to Hertfordshire, she taught for The Open University and the Borehamwood College of Further Education. Through her position at The Open University she came to work with Celia Hoyles, who encouraged her to become an academic researcher in a project combining mathematics education with computer programming in the Logo programming language. She worked at the University of London from 1983 until 1995, when she was given a Chair in Education at the University of Bristol.

At Bristol, in 1997, she chaired a national committee that helped bring algebra to a more prominent position in secondary-school mathematics education. She was the head of the school from 2003 to 2006, and again in 2014. She also played a key role in improving educational opportunities for underprivileged youth in south Bristol.

She died on 26 January 2019.

== Books ==
Sutherland was the author or coauthor of several books or booklets on mathematics education, including:

- Logo Mathematics in the Classroom (Routledge / Chapman & Hall, 1989)
- Exploring Mathematics with Spreadsheets (with Lulu Healy, Blackwell, 1992)
- Key Aspects of Teaching Algebra in Schools (with John Mason, QCA, 2002)
- A Comparative Study of Algebra Curricula (QCA, 2002)
- Screenplay: Children and Computing in the Home (with Keri Facer, John Furlong, and Ruth Furlong, RoutledgeFalmer, 2003)
- Teaching for Learning Mathematics (Open University Press / McGraw Hill, 2007)
- Improving Classroom Learning With ICT (with Susan Robertson and Peter John, Routledge, 2009)
- Education and Social Justice in a Digital Age (Bristol University Press, 2014)

She also edited books including:

- Theory of Didactical Situations in Mathematics (Didactique des Mathématiques, 1970–1990) (by Guy Brousseau, edited and translated by Balacheff, Cooper, Sutherland, and Warfield, Kluwer, 1997)
- Learning and Teaching Where Worldviews Meet (edited with Guy Claxton and Andrew Pollard, Trentham, 2004)
