= Alisha Boe =

Norwegian actress (born 1997)

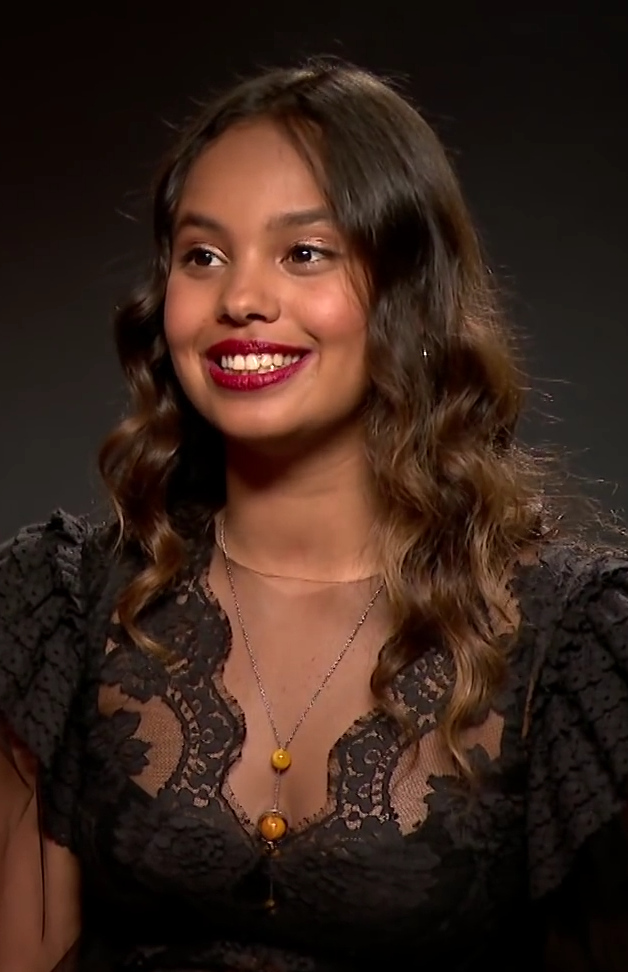
- Boe in 2018
- Born: Alisha Ilhaan Bø; 6 March 1997 (age 29); Oslo, Norway
- Occupation: Actress
- Years active: 2008–present

Alisha Ilhaan Bø (born 6 March 1997), known professionally as Alisha Boe, is a Norwegian actress. She is known for playing Jessica Davis in the Netflix drama series 13 Reasons Why, and Conchita Closson in the Apple TV period drama series The Buccaneers.

== Early life ==
Boe was born in Oslo, Norway, on 6 March 1997, the daughter of a Norwegian mother from Trondheim and a Somali father. Her parents later divorced and her mother, Vibeke, remarried an American man; Boe moved to Los Angeles with her mother and stepfather at the age of seven. She attended El Camino Real High School, where she got involved with the drama program.

== Career ==
Boe made her acting debut in 2008, when she landed a role of a young Lisa Swan in the horror film Amusement. A year later, she appeared in the film He's On My Mind, and in the 2012 horror film Paranormal Activity 4. In 2014, she guest-starred in Modern Family and two episodes of Extant.

In November 2014, she joined the cast of NBC's soap opera Days of Our Lives in the recurring role of Daphne. From 2017 to 2020, she portrayed the role of Jessica Davis in the Netflix original drama series 13 Reasons Why.

In January 2021, Boe joined the cast of Jesse Eisenberg's feature film directorial debut When You Finish Saving the World.

In June 2022, Boe joined the cast of Katherine Jakeways’ Apple TV+ series The Buccaneers, starring as one of the leads of the show, Conchita Closson.

== Filmography ==
=== Film ===
| Year | Title | Role |
|---|---|---|
| 2008 | Amusement | Young Lisa Swan |
| 2009 | He's On My Mind | Laci |
| 2012 | Paranormal Activity 4 | Tara |
| 2017 | 68 Kill | Violet |
| 2019 | Gates of Darkness | Alexa O'Connor |
| 2019 | Poms | Chloe |
| 2019 | Yes, God, Yes | Nina |
| 2022 | When You Finish Saving the World | Lila |
| 2022 | Do Revenge | Tara Scott |

=== Television ===
| Year | Title | Role | Notes |
|---|---|---|---|
| 2012 | Parenthood | Pretty girl | Episode: "Everything Is Not Okay" |
| 2013 | Trophy Wife | Chelsea Trassen | Episode: "Pilot" |
| 2014 | Modern Family | Tracy McCoy | Episode: "And One to Grow On" |
| 2014 | Extant | Brynn Hendy | 2 episodes |
| 2014–2015 | Days of Our Lives | Daphne | 15 episodes |
| 2015–2016 | Ray Donovan | Janet | Recurring role (seasons 3–4) |
| 2015 | NCIS | Farrah Meyers | Episode: "Viral" |
| 2015 | Casual | Becca | Recurring role (season 1) |
| 2015–2016 | CSI: Cyber | Grace Clarke | 3 episodes |
| 2016 | Teen Wolf | Gwen | 3 episodes |
| 2017–2020 | 13 Reasons Why | Jessica Davis | Main role |
| 2018 | Robot Chicken | Raina / Stacy London / little girl (voices) | Episode: "No Wait, He Has a Cane" |
| 2023–present | The Buccaneers | Conchita Closson | Main role |

=== Music videos ===
| Year | Title | Role | Artist |
|---|---|---|---|
| 2018 | "Lost in Japan" | Girl | Shawn Mendes, Zedd |
| 2021 | "Why Don't You Touch Me: Part 1" | Woman | Leon Bridges |
