= Ski Storsenter =

Shopping mall in Ski, Akershus, Norway

Coordinates: 59°42′59″N 10°50′10″E

Ski Storsenter is a shopping mall located at Ski in Akershus county, Norway. In 2002 it had a turnover of 1,186 billion Norwegian kroner. It opened in 1995, and has today 145 stores on three floors. The builder and operator is the Olav Thon Group (Norwegian: Olav Thon Gruppen) which is owned by the Olav Thon Foundation (Olav Thon Stiftelsen).
