= Aubri Ibrag =

Russian-Australian actress (born 2001)

Aubri Ibrag (born 21 August 2001) is a Dagestanian-Australian actress. On television, she is best known for her roles in the 10 Shake series Dive Club (2021) and the Apple TV+ series The Buccaneers (2023).

== Early life ==
Ibrag lived in Moscow, her family from Dagestan, until she moved to Melbourne, Australia at the age of 10. Growing up, she was interested in running and had aspirations to compete in the Olympics. She became interested in acting through learning Shakespeare in her English and Drama classes when she was 16.

== Career ==
Ibrag uploaded her first YouTube video, a makeup tutorial, in September 2015. Known for her beauty content, her YouTube channel gained over 500 thousand subscribers. She also signed with Chadwick Models. Ibrag deleted her YouTube videos in September 2021. In 2022, the Herald Sun named Ibrag one of Victoria's top social media influencers.

Having decided to pursue acting in 2019, Ibrag made her television debut with a main role as Anna in the teen drama Dive Club, which aired on 10 Shake in Australia and had an international release on Netflix in 2021. She was then cast as Lizzy Elmsworth in the 2023 Apple TV+ adaptation of The Buccaneers.

She is set to appear in I Let You In, a virtual reality 6-episode series based on the Talk to Me universe, which is set to debut on Meta Platforms in 2027.

== Filmography ==
=== Television ===
Year	Title	Role	Notes	Ref.
2021	Dive Club	Anna	Main role; 12 episodes	
2023-	The Buccaneers	Lizzy Elmsworth	Main role; 11 episodes	

=== Virtual reality series ===
Year	Title	Role	Notes	Ref.
2027	I Let You In	TBA	Post-production	
