= 35th Young Artist Awards =

2014 US media awards ceremony

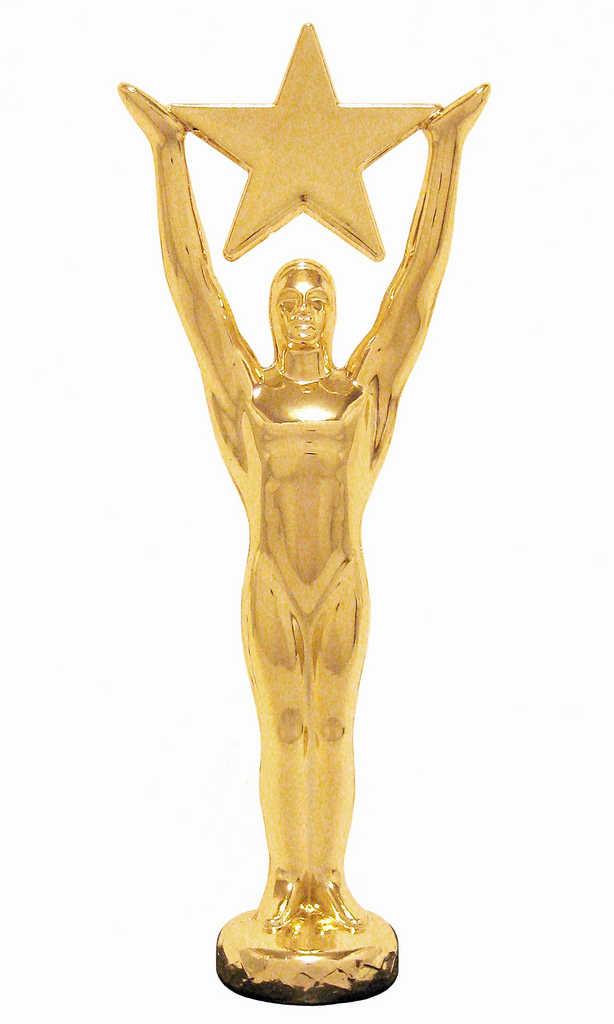
- Awarded for: Achievement during the year 2013 in film and television
- Date: May 4, 2014
- Site: Sportsmen's Lodge; Studio City, California
- Hosted by: Zach Callison

The 35th Young Artist Awards ceremony, presented by the Young Artist Association, honored excellence of young performers between the ages of 5 and 21 in the fields of film, television, theatre and the internet for the 2013 calendar year. Nominations were announced on March 30, 2014. Winners were announced on May 4, 2014, at the annual ceremony and banquet luncheon held in the Empire Ballroom of the Sportsmen's Lodge in Studio City, California. Live entertainment for the event included 19-year-old country music artist Kaitlyn Baker.

Competitive categories for the 35th annual ceremony recognized young film, television, theatrical and internet performers in leading, supporting, guest-starring, recurring and voice-over roles, as well as ensemble casts. Receiving the most nominations for the year is the Hub Network program Spooksville, leading with a total of nine nominations. Voting was undertaken by former Youth in Film Award/Young Artist Award winners, from 1979 to 2011.

Established in 1978 by long-standing Hollywood Foreign Press Association member, Maureen Dragone, the Young Artist Association was the first organization to establish an awards ceremony specifically set to recognize and award the contributions of performers under the age of 21 in the fields of film, television, theater and music.

== Categories ==
★ Winners were announced on May 4, 2014.

== Best Performance in a Feature Film ==
=== Best Performance in a Feature Film - Leading Young Actor ===
★ Miles Elliot - Camp - Roebuck Media

- Skylan Brooks - The Inevitable Defeat of Mister & Pete - Lionsgate
- Chandler Canterbury - Standing Up - Aldamisa Entertainment
- Liam James - The Way Way Back - Sycamore Pictures
- Maxim Knight - Medeas - Keyhole Productions

=== Best Performance in a Feature Film - Leading Young Actress ===
★ Sophie Nélisse - The Book Thief - 20th Century Fox
★ Loreta Peralta - Instructions Not Included - Pantelion Films

- Annalise Basso - Standing Up - Aldamisa Entertainment
- Megan Charpentier - Mama - Universal Pictures
- Abigail Hargrove - World War Z - Paramount Pictures

=== Best Performance in a Feature Film - Supporting Young Actor ===
★ Callan McAuliffe - The Great Gatsby - Warner Brothers

- River Alexander - The Way Way Back - Sycamore Pictures
- Cole Coker - Suddenly - Vivendi Entertainment
- Justin Tinucci - Standing Up - Aldamisa Entertainment
- Jake Vaughn - Medeas - Keyhole Productions

=== Best Performance in a Feature Film - Supporting Young Actress ===
★ Fátima Ptacek - Tio Papi - JMC Independent

- Giselle Eisenberg - The Wolf of Wall Street - Paramount Pictures
- Gianna Gomez - Camp - Roebuck Media
- Mimi Kirkland - Safe Haven - Relativity Media
- Laura Krystine - Instructions Not Included - Pantelion Films
- Morgan McGarry - Mama - Universal Pictures
- Katelyn Mager - Percy Jackson: Sea of Monsters - 20th Century Fox
- Isabelle Nélisse - Mama - Universal Pictures
- Gracie Prewitt - Her - Warner Brothers

== Best Performance in a Short Film ==
=== Best Performance in a Short Film - Young Actor 16-21 ===
★ David Topp - The Box - Topp Scot Productions

- Connor Beardmore - Insecurbia - UBC/Kori/Depauw
- Austin MacDonald - Portrait of Ryan - Badon Hill Productions
- Caleb Thomas - Mrs. Sweeney - Cagle/Kinmont Productions
- Austin James Wolff - Sugar - J. Johnson Productions

=== Best Performance in a Short Film - Young Actor 13-15 ===
★ Peter Bundic - Lord of The Guys - SFU

- Christopher Bones - The Curse of The Un-Kissable Kid - MarrMark Productions
- Jake Davidson - Mrs. Sweeney - Cagle/Kinmont Productions
- Dawson Dunbar - Favorite Things - Agriotherium Films
- Myles Erlick - Sing Along - Oxman Productions
- Max Humphreys - Spin the Barrel - Independent
- Noah Johnson - The Ladder - SWYFT Productions
- William Leon - The Curse of The Un-Kissable Kid - MarrMark Productions
- Mark Ramsay - Way Charn! The Legend of Scrin Pipjaw - Ryerson Films
- Chad Roberts - Plain White Tee - Independent

=== Best Performance in a Short Film - Young Actress 13-21 ===
★ Chanel Marriott - - USC-Cinematic Arts

- Megan Brown - Our TownPenny Arcade - Arrowhead Productions
- Adrienne Hicks - The Mary Contest - Independent
- Jennifer Jolliff - On Becoming a Man - Brand New Day Productions
- Laci Kay - The Lesson - Ooh La La Productions
- Shannon Kummer - Mrs. Sweeney - Cagle/Kinmont Productions
- Ruka Felicity Nagashima - Box of Hearts - Independent
- Kalia Prescott - Sugar - J. Johnson Productions
- Liv Southard - The Curse of the Un-Kissable Kid - MarrMark Productions
- Sofie Uretsky - Naughty or Nice - York University

=== Best Performance in a Short Film - Young Actor 11-12 ===
★ Joshua Costea - Lord of the Guys - SFU

- Brady Bryson - The Specifics - Immaginaire Films
- Brice Evan Fisher - Mothership - Independent
- Reese Gonzales - White Shoe - Fotocomics Productions
- Joseph Haag - The Curse of The Un-Kissable Kid - MarrMark Productions

=== Best Performance in a Short Film - Young Actress 11-12 ===
★ Adanna Avon - The Mary Contest - Independent

- Angelique Marion Berry - Anna's Wish - Mitchell Verigin Productions/G5 Films
- Ava Cantrell - Above the 101 - Punching Bees Productions
- Kylie Cast - Last Round - Percolating Pictures
- Kaitlin Cheung - 13 Santas - T. Hansen Productions
- Alyssa Brianne Miller - Mrs. Sweeney - Cagle-Kinmont Productions

=== Best Performance in a Short Film - Young Actor 10 and Under ===
★ Jonah Wineberg - Circles - Circle Productions

- Alexander Davis - Senior Drivers - Hayes Harris Productions
- Richard Davis - To Look Away - Ryerson Short Feature
- Zander Faden - Dirty Laundry - AFI
- Zachary Haven - Mrs. Sweeney - Cagle/Kinmont Productions
- Jakob Wedel - 1982 - Atom Films

=== Best Performance in a Short Film - Young Actress 10 and Under ===
★ Peyton Kennedy - To Look Away - Ryerson Films

- Allison Augustin - Clean Teeth Wednesdays - Boomerang Films
- Giovanna Cappetta Cesare - Charity Case - Jnine Media
- Maia Costea - Heny and Gloria - Burnaby
- Emily Delahunty - Bike Tales - Chaconia Pictures
- Erika Forest - Bike Tales - Chaconia Pictures
- Madeline Lupi - American Autumn - Les Films Sur Mer

== Best Performance in a TV Movie, Miniseries, Special or Pilot ==
=== Best Performance in a TV Movie, Miniseries, Special or Pilot - Young Actor ===
★ Kyle Harrison Breitkopf - Catch a Christmas Star - Hallmark Channel

- Griffin Cleveland - Santa Switch - Hallmark Channel
- Christian Distefano - Finding Christmas - Hallmark Channel
- Sean Michael Kyer - Hats Off to Christmas - Hallmark Channel

=== Best Performance in a TV Movie, Miniseries, Special or Pilot - Young Actress ===
★ Savannah McReynolds - The Wrong Woman - Lifetime

- Ella Ballentine - Clara's Deadly Secret - Lifetime
- Bianca D'Ambrosio - Marked - SyFy
- Julia Lalonde - Catch a Christmas Star - Hallmark Channel
- Madison McAleer - House of Versace - Lifetime
- Annie Thurman - Santa Switch - Hallmark Channel

== Best Performance in a TV Series ==
=== Best Performance in a TV Series - Leading Young Actor ===
★ Chandler Riggs - The Walking Dead - AMC

- Keean Johnson - Spooksville - The Hub Network
- Nathan McLeod - Life with Boys - Nickelodeon

=== Best Performance in a TV Series - Leading Young Actress ===
★ Layla Crawford - The First Family - Entertainment Studios

- Katie Douglas - Spooksville - The Hub Network
- Chloe Lang - LazyTown - Sprout
- Olivia Scriven - Degrassi: The Next Generation - CTV

=== Best Performance in a TV Series - Supporting Young Actor ===
★ Max Burkholder - Parenthood - NBC

- Tyree Brown - Parenthood - NBC
- Maxim Knight - Falling Skies - TNT
- Xolo Mariduena - Parenthood - NBC
- McCarrie McCausland - Army Wives - Lifetime
- Nick Purcha - Spooksville - The Hub Network
- Albert Tsai - Trophy Wife - ABC

=== Best Performance in a TV Series - Supporting Young Actress ===
★ Isabella Cramp - The Neighbors - ABC

- Morgan Taylor Campbell - Spooksville - The Hub Network
- Alisha Newton - Heartland - CBC
- Savannah Paige Rae - Parenthood - NBC

=== Best Performance in a TV Series - Guest Starring Young Actor 17-21 ===
★ Evan Crooks - Grey's Anatomy - ABC
★ Dominik Michon-Dagenais - 30 Vies - Radio-Canada (TV)

- Tajh Bellow - The First Family - Entertainment One
- Austin Fryberger - Sam & Cat - Nickelodeon

=== Best Performance in a TV Series - Guest Starring Young Actress 17-21 ===
★ Siobhan Williams - Motive - ABC

- Laine MacNeil - R. L. Stine's The Haunting Hour - The Hub Network
- Tiera Skovbye - Spooksville - The Hub Network

=== Best Performance in a TV Series - Guest Starring Young Actor 14-16 ===
★ Matt Cornett - Southland - Turner Network
★ Matthew J. Evans Lab Rats - Disney XD

- C.J. Berdahl - Shameless - Showtime
- Joe DiGiovanni - Deadtime Stories - Nickelodeon
- Zayne Emory - A.N.T. Farm - Disney Channel
- Christian Hutcherson - See Dad Run - Nickelodeon
- Joey Luthman - A.N.T. Farm - Disney Channel
- Owen Teague - NCIS: Los Angeles - CBS
- Justin Tinucci - Trophy Wife - ABC

=== Best Performance in a TV Series - Guest Starring Young Actress 14-16 ===
★ Danika Yarosh - 1600 Penn - NBC

- Lizze Broadway - Bones - FOX
- Mandalynn Carlson - Scandal - ABC
- Madison Leisle - Touch - FOX

=== Best Performance in a TV Series - Guest Starring Young Actor 11-13 ===
★ Joshua Carlon - Sam & Cat - Nickelodeon

- Jake Elliott - Kickin' It - Disney XD
- Sam Humphreys - Seed - Rogers Media
- Sean Michael Kyer - Spooksville - The Hub Network
- Toby Nichols - American Horror Story - FX
- Darien Provost - Package Deal - City TV

=== Best Performance in a TV Series - Guest Starring Young Actress 11-13 ===
★ Ava Cantrell - The Haunted Hathaways - Nickelodeon
★ Lexi DiBenedetto - Grey's Anatomy - ABC

- Tara-Nicole Azarian - Supreme Justice with Judge Karen - Entertainment Studios
- Brielle Barbusca - Modern Family - ABC
- Cameron Protzman - Mad Men - AMC
- Rowan Rycroft - R. L. Stine's The Haunting Hour - The Hub Network
- Paris Smith - Modern Family - ABC

=== Best Performance in a TV Series - Guest Starring Young Actor 10 and Under ===
★ Christian Distefano - Murdoch Mysteries - CBC

- Raphael Alejandro - Almost Human - FOX
- Felix Avitia - Bones - FOX
- Thomas Barbusca - The New Normal - NBC
- Tate Berney - Sons of Anarchy - FX
- Kyle Harrison Breitkopf - Satisfaction - CTV

=== Best Performance in a TV Series - Guest Starring Young Actress 10 and Under ===
★ Jena Skodje - R. L. Stine's The Haunting Hour - The Hub Network

- Chiara D'Ambrosio - Legit - FX
- Arcadia Kendal - Murdoch Mysteries - CBC
- Kyla-Drew Simmons - How I Met Your Mother - CBS

=== Best Performance in a TV Series - Recurring Young Actor 17-21 ===
★ Mikey Reid - Victorious - Nickelodeon

- Samuel Patrick Chu - Spooksville - The Hub Network
- Brock Ciarelli - The Middle - ABC
- Evan Crooks - The Carrie Diaries - CW
- Harrison Houde - Spooksville - The Hub Network
- Austin MacDonald - Life with Boys - Nickelodeon

=== Best Performance in a TV Series - Recurring Young Actress 17-21 ===
★ Kelly Heyer - Raising Hope - FOX

- Laine MacNeil - The Killing - AMC
- Katlin Mastandrea - The Middle - ABC

=== Best Performance in a TV Series - Recurring Young Actor ===
★ William Monette - 30 Vies - Radio-Canada (TV)

- LJ Benet - Dog with a Blog - Disney Channel
- Nathan O'Toole - Vikings - History Channel
- Brandon Soo Hoo - Supah Ninjas - Nickelodeon
- Ethan Ross Wills - Granite Flats - BYU TV
- Robbie Tucker - See Dad Run - Nickelodeon

=== Best Performance in a TV Series - Recurring Young Actress ===
★ Kayla Maisonet - Dog with a Blog - Disney Channel

- Jaylen Barron - Good Luck Charlie - Disney Channel
- Haley Pullos - Instant Mom - Nick Jr.
- Danika Yarosh - See Dad Run - Nickelodeon

=== Best Performance in a TV Series - Recurring Young Actor 10 and Under ===
★ Rio Mangini - Kickin' It - Disney XD

- Cole Sand - Masters of Sex - Showtime
- Josie Totah - Jessie - Disney Channel

=== Best Performance in a Daytime TV Series - Young Actor ===
★ Jimmy Deshler - General Hospital - ABC

- Daniel Polo - The Young and the Restless - CBS

=== Best Performance in a Daytime TV Series - Young Actress ===
★ Haley Pullos - General Hospital - ABC

- Johnnie Ladd - The Young and the Restless - CBS
- McKenna Roberts - The Young and the Restless - CBS
- Brooklyn Rae Silzer - General Hospital - ABC

=== Outstanding Young Ensemble in a TV Series ===
★ Parenthood - NBC

Savannah Paige Rae, Tyree Brown, Max Burkholder, Xolo Maridueña

- Spooksville - The Hub Network

Katie Douglas, Keean Johnson, Nick Purcha, Morgan Taylor Campbell

== Best Performance in a Voice-Over Role ==
=== Best Performance in a Voice-Over Role - Young Actor ===
★ Jaden Betts - Doc McStuffins - Disney Channel

- Zach Callison - Steven Universe - Cartoon Network
- Devan Cohen - PAW Patrol - Nickelodeon
- Christian Distefano - Peg + Cat - PBS
- Jacob Ewaniuk - The Cat in the Hat Knows a Lot About That! - PBS

=== Best Performance in a Voice-Over Role - Young Actress ===
★ Alexa Torrington - The Cat in the Hat Knows a Lot About That! - PBS

- Sophia Ewaniuk - Ella the Elephant - Disney Channel
- Bailey Gambertoglio - Bubble Guppies - Nickelodeon
- Kallan Holley - PAW Patrol - Nickelodeon
- Haley B. Powell - Imaginext Adventures - Fisher Price

== Best Performance in a DVD Film ==
=== Best Performance in a DVD Film - Young Actor ===
★ Zach Callison - All American Christmas Carol - August Heart Entertainment
★ Darien Provost - Super Buddies - Disney

- Austin Anderson - Wiener Dog Nationals - Inception Studios
- Julian Feder - Wiener Dog Nationals - Inception Studios
- Brandon Tyler Russell - Wiener Dog Nationals - Inception Studios

=== Best Performance in a DVD Film - Young Actress ===
★ Kenzie Pallone - Adventures of Bailey: A Night in Cowtown - Hungry Bear Productions

- Caitlin Carmichael - Wiener Dog Nationals - Inception Studios
- Ruka Felicity Nagashima - The Mark: Redemption - Eagle Films

== Best Web Performance ==
=== Best Web Performance - Young Actor ===
★ Joey Luthman - Chosen - Crackle.com

- Kyle Agnew - Cowboys and Indians - Epiphany Pictures
- Richard Davis - Kid's Town - Kid's Town Productions, Inc.
- Jacob Ewaniuk - Kid's Town - Kid's Town Productions, Inc.
- Brice Evan Fisher - CollegeHumor Originals - Botown Sound Productions
- David Knoll - Kid's Town - Kid's Town Productions, Inc.

=== Best Web Performance - Young Actress ===
★ Caitlin Carmichael - Chosen - Crackle.com

- Hannah Swain - Spirits - Woggle Box Entertainment
- Brandi Alyssa Young - The Dark One - Insidious Set Productions

== Best Performance in Live Theater ==
=== Best Performance in Live Theater - Young Actor ===
★ Quinn Van De Keere - The Christmas Coat - Forte Theatre, Vancouver

- Caleb McLaughlin - The Lion King - Minskoff Theatre, New York
- Matthew Nardozzi - Irving Berlin's America - Wayne YMCA, New Jersey
- Grant Palmer - The Steward of Christendom - Mark Taper Forum, California

=== Best Performance in Live Theater - Young Actress ===
★ Jolie Vanier - Detention - Palmer Cultural Center, Switzerland

- Ella Ballentine - Les Misérables - Princess of Wales Theatre, Toronto
- Madison Brydges - Numbers - Winchester Theatre, Toronto
- Saara Chaudry - Les Misérables - Princess of Wales Theatre, Toronto
- Alexis Rosinsky - To Dream Again - The Spot Theatre, California

== Special awards ==
=== Outstanding Live Performance ===
★ Nate Nordine – Youngest performer in Cirque de la Symphonie

=== Maureen Dragone Scholarship Award ===
★ Inner-City Arts – Enriching the lives of children through art

=== Jackie Coogan Award ===
Contribution to Youth
★ Tina Jønk Christensen – Excellence in journalism celebrating young artists

=== Social Relations of Knowledge Institute Award ===
★ How It's Made – Science Channel
