= Josh Peters (producer) =

American film producer

- Peters at the 2026 Sundance Film Festival
- Occupation: Producer
- Years active: 2015–present

Josh Peters is an American film producer. He has produced The Lighthouse (2019), Uncle Frank (2020), Soft & Quiet (2022), Mutt (2023), Dìdi (2024) and Josephine (2026).

== Early life ==
Peters attended University of California, Los Angeles receiving a Bachelor of Arts degree in English.

== Career ==
Peters previously served as the director of acquisitions at Focus Features.

Peters has served as an executive producer on The Lighthouse directed by Robert Eggers, and Uncle Frank directed by Alan Ball, for which he received a Primetime Emmy Award for Outstanding Television Movie.

In 2022, Peters co-founded the production company Spark Features alongside Robina Riccitiello. Under the banner, he has served as a producer on films including Mutt and Dìdi alongside over 25 productions in their first two years.

In 2025, Peters earned a Peabody for Black Box Diaries and Best First Feature Spirit Award by Film Independent for his role producing Dìdi prior to having Black Box Diaries and Porcelain War nominated for Academy Awards.

=== Film ===
Year	Film	Credit
2019	The Lighthouse	Executive producer
2020	Uncle Frank	Executive producer
2022	A Love Song	Co-producer
2022	Sell/Buy/Date	Consulting producer
2022	Soft & Quiet	Producer
2022	Know Your Place	Executive producer
2022	God's Time	Executive producer
2023	A Still Small Voice	Co-executive producer
2023	Mutt	Executive producer
2023	The Graduates	Producer
2023	The Queen of My Dreams	Executive producer
2023	The Last Showgirl	Executive producer
2024	Dìdi	Producer
2024	Black Box Diaries	Executive producer
2024	Porcelain War	Executive producer
2024	Tendaberry	Executive producer
2024	The Black Sea	Executive producer
2024	Grand Theft Hamlet	Co-executive producer
2024	Dreams in Nightmares	Producer
2025	Ricky	Producer
2025	Rebuilding	Executive producer
2025	Mad Bills to Pay	Executive producer
2025	Idiotka	Executive Producer
2025	The President's Cake	Executive producer
2025	Bird in Hand	Executive Producer
2026	Josephine	Producer
2026	Hot Water	Producer
2026	If I Go Will They Miss Me	Producer
