= Mountain Music Museum =

Coordinates: 36.5479951°N 82.55989649999998°W

- Established: 1998
- Location: 316 Broad Street; Kingsport, Tennessee 37660
- Type: Museum
- Director: Rick Dollar

The Mountain Music Museum (a.k.a. the ACMA Mountain Music Museum) in Kingsport, Tennessee, was a museum dedicated to the history of music that originated primarily in East Tennessee, North Carolina, Southeast Kentucky, Virginia and West Virginia during the 19th century and evolved into what is now generally recognized as bluegrass music and country music. The museum is owned and operated by the nonprofit Appalachian Cultural Music Association (ACMA). Exhibits include vintage musical instruments, recordings, photographs and other memorabilia. Among well-known 20th century performers who have exhibits in the museum are the Carter Family, the Stoneman Family, Jimmie Rodgers, Flatt & Scruggs, Mac Wiseman, The Stanley Brothers, Tennessee Ernie Ford, Mel Street, Archie Campbell and others. Originally based in Bristol, Tennessee, the museum is now located at 316 Broad Street in Kingsport.

== History ==
In 1998, bluegrass musician Tim White, who hosts the television program "Song of the Mountains," and business owner James Bryant cofounded the Appalachian Cultural Music Association (ACMA), a nonprofit organization, to preserve and promote bluegrass, old-time gospel, classic country and Appalachian-style music. The ACMA opened an office and museum at the Bristol Mall, after mall manager Harry Esenwine donated space. The ACMA began a series of live musical performances at the mall, titled "The Pickin' Porch Show."

In 2012, business owner Allen Hurley offered the ACMA a larger space in a building he owned at 626 State Street in Bristol. The organization relocated the Mountain Music Museum to that location, but continued to promote "The Pickin' Porch Show" at the Bristol Mall. The show relocated to a stage inside the museum in 2013.

In October 2017, the ACMA announced plans to move the Mountain Music Museum and "The Pickin' Porch Show" to a new location at 316 Broad Street in Kingsport.

In December 2017, the ACMA announced that Rick Dollar had been hired as executive director of the Mountain Music Museum.

On January 27, 2018, a grand reopening celebration was held at the Mountain Music Museum's new location, with live musical performances by Ralph Stanley II & the Clinch Mountain Boys, Tim White & Troublesome Hollow, and Kaitlyn Baker. A new exhibit dedicated to the late bluegrass artist, Dr. Ralph Stanley, was also unveiled.

In April, 2018, the museum announced that it had acquired a rare fiddle, believed to have been owned by the late country music legend Roy Acuff, for a one-year exhibit beginning May 1. The fiddle had previously attracted national attention, when it was mistakenly donated to a Goodwill store in Kansas City, Missouri. Goodwill returned the fiddle to its owner, Lamar Peek, who later agreed to loan it to the Mountain Music Museum.

The museum closed in 2019 due to unsustainable maintenance costs.

== See also ==
- List of music museums
