= Hot Water (2026 film) =

2026 drama film by Ramzi Bashour

- Directed by: Ramzi Bashour
- Written by: Ramzi Bashour
- Produced by: Jesse Hope; Max Walker-Silverman; Josh Peters
- Starring: Lubna Azabal; Daniel Zolghadri; Dale Dickey
- Cinematography: Alfonso Herrera Salcedo
- Edited by: Mollie Goldstein
- Music by: Ramzi Bashour; James Elkington
- Production companies: 10mK; Spark Features; The Sakana Foundation; Cinereach
- Distributed by: Rich Spirit
- Release date: January 23, 2026 (Sundance Film Festival)
- Running time: 97 minutes
- Country: United States
- Languages: English; Arabic; French

Hot Water is a 2026 American comedy-drama film written, directed, and scored by Ramzi Bashour in his feature directorial debut. The film stars Lubna Azabal, Daniel Zolghadri, and Dale Dickey.

The film was developed through the Sundance Institute Screenwriters and Directors Labs. It premiered in the U.S. Dramatic Competition at the 2026 Sundance Film Festival on January 23, 2026.

== Premise ==
After being expelled from his high school in Indiana, an American teenager (Daniel Zolghadri) and his Lebanese mother (Lubna Azabal) embark on a road trip west. Their journey becomes an exploration of diaspora, displacement, and the definitions of home.

== Cast ==
- Lubna Azabal as Layal
- Daniel Zolghadri as Daniel
- Dale Dickey
- Gabe Fazio as Layal's ex-husband

== Production ==
The film marks the feature debut of Syrian American filmmaker Ramzi Bashour. The project was supported by the Sundance Institute, with Bashour participating as a fellow in 2022, 2023, and 2024 to develop the script.

It is produced by Jesse Hope, Josh Peters, and filmmaker Max Walker-Silverman (known for A Love Song). In December 2025, it was announced that Films Boutique had acquired international sales rights for the film, while Cinetic Media represents North American rights.

== Release ==
Hot Water premiered at the Sundance Film Festival on January 23, 2026. In March 2026, Rich Spirit acquired distribution rights to the film.
