= Daniel Zolghadri =

American actor (born 2000)

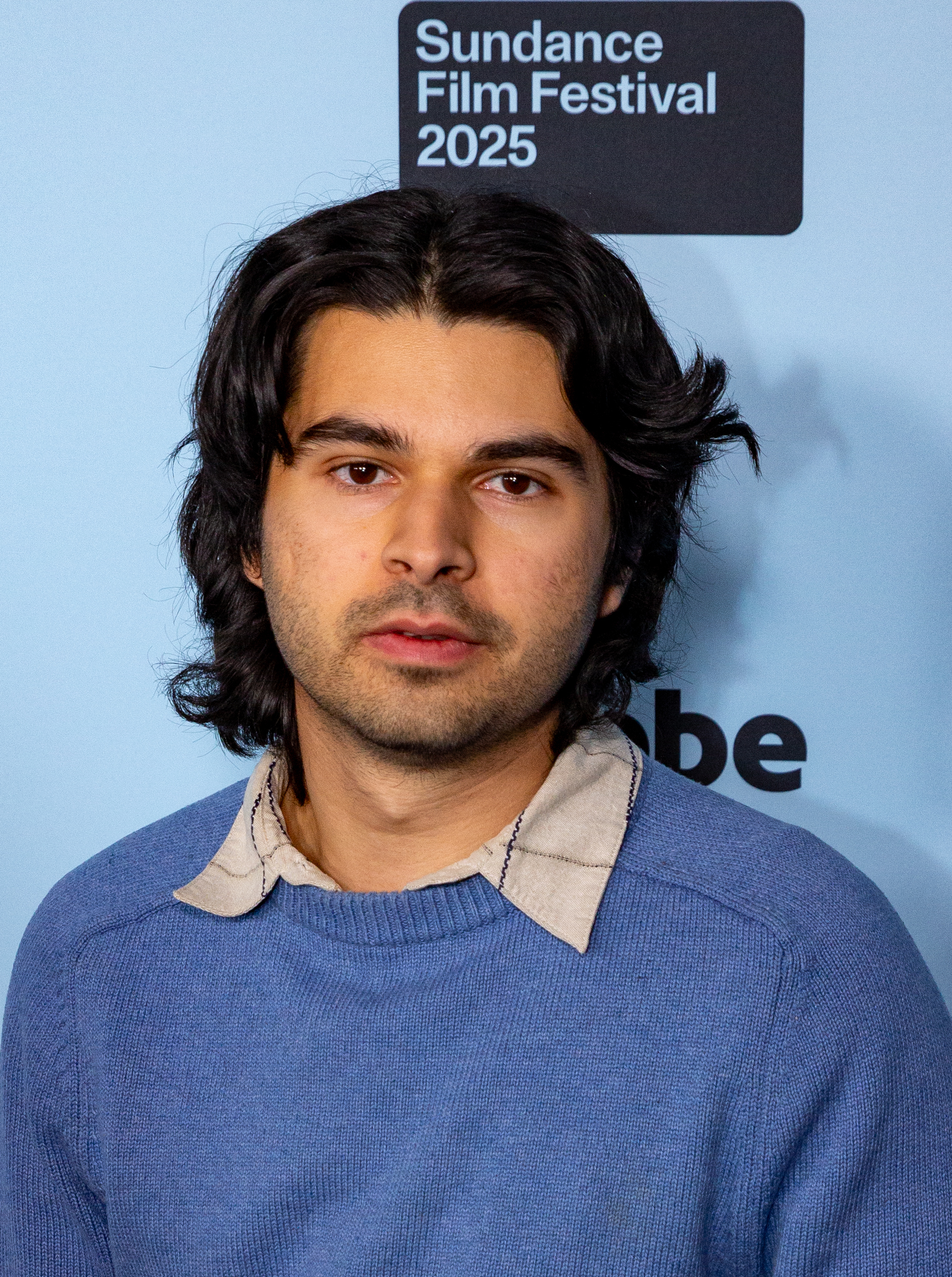
- Zolghadri at the 2025 Sundance Film Festival
- Born: February 9, 2000 (age 26)
- Occupation: Actor
- Years active: 2013–present

Daniel Zolghadri (born February 9, 2000) is an American actor known for his roles in Eighth Grade, Low Tide, Funny Pages, and Hot Water. He attended the Orange County School of the Arts.

== Career ==
At age 13, Zolghadri made his debut in a television series in 2013, performing a guest role in Once Upon a Time in Wonderland as Mirza. Zolghadri played the role of Max Killas in the 2015 television film Evil Men directed by Gary Fleder.

In 2018, Zolghadri appeared in the coming-of-age comedy film Eighth Grade directed by Bo Burnham. On the same year, Zolghadri was part of the cast of the romantic comedy film Alex Strangelove opposite Daniel Doheny, Antonio Marziale and Madeline Weinstein, where he played the role of Dell, which was premiered at the San Francisco International Film Festival on April 14, 2018, and released on June 8, 2018, on Netflix.

Zolghadri co-starred Keean Johnson, Alex Neustaedter, Kristine Froseth and Jaeden Martell in the 2019 drama film Low Tide directed by Kevin McMullin, where he played the role of Smitty.

Zolghadri was cast in the sci-fi drama series Tales from the Loop opposite Rebecca Hall, Paul Schneider, Duncan Joiner and Jonathan Pryce. He played the role of Jakob.

Zolghadri played the lead role of Robert in the coming-of-age black comedy film Funny Pages directed by Owen Kline, which was premiered at the 2022 Cannes Film Festival on May 24, 2022, and was released on August 26, 2022, where it received positive reviews from critics. For his performance he was nominated for an Independent Spirit Award for Best Breakthrough Performance.

In 2026, Zolghadri co-starred with Lubna Azabal and Dale Dickey in the comedy-drama road film Hot Water, written and directed by Ramzi Bashour, which premiered at the 2026 Sundance Film Festival.

== Filmography ==
=== Film ===
Year	Title	Role	Notes
2016	The Persian Connection	Young Behrouz	
2018	Eighth Grade	Riley	
2018	Ready Player One	High School Kid	
2018	Alex Strangelove	Dell	
2018	Fahrenheit 451	Clifford	
2019	Low Tide	Smitty	
2022	Funny Pages	Robert	
2024	Y2K	CJ	
2025	If I Had Legs I'd Kick You	Stephen	
2025	Lurker	Noah	
2026	Hot Water	Daniel	
2026	Magazine	Leonard	
TBA	My Darling California †	Kent	Filming

=== Television ===
Year	Title	Role	Notes
2013	Once Upon a Time in Wonderland	Mirza	Episode: "Bad Blood"
2014	Intelligence	Young Boy	Episode: "Red X"
2014	Scorpion	Young Walter O'Brien	3 episodes
2015	Weird Loners	Frank	Episode: "The Weirdfather"
2015	NCIS	Luke Harris	3 episodes
2015	Evil Men	Max Killas	Television film
2016	Speechless	Carter	Episode: "Pilot"
2017	No Activity	Mason	2 episodes
2020	Tales from the Loop	Jakob	7 episodes
2024	American Horror Stories	Declan	Episode: "Leprechaun"

== Career ==
At age 13, Zolghadri made his debut in a television series in 2013, performing a guest role in Once Upon a Time in Wonderland as Mirza. Zolghadri played the role of Max Killas in the 2015 television film Evil Men directed by Gary Fleder.

In 2018, Zolghadri appeared in the coming-of-age comedy film Eighth Grade directed by Bo Burnham. On the same year, Zolghadri was part of the cast of the romantic comedy film Alex Strangelove opposite Daniel Doheny, Antonio Marziale and Madeline Weinstein, where he played the role of Dell, which was premiered at the San Francisco International Film Festival on April 14, 2018, and released on June 8, 2018, on Netflix.

Zolghadri co-starred Keean Johnson, Alex Neustaedter, Kristine Froseth and Jaeden Martell in the 2019 drama film Low Tide directed by Kevin McMullin, where he played the role of Smitty.

Zolghadri was cast in the sci-fi drama series Tales from the Loop opposite Rebecca Hall, Paul Schneider, Duncan Joiner and Jonathan Pryce. He played the role of Jakob.

Zolghadri played the lead role of Robert in the coming-of-age black comedy film Funny Pages directed by Owen Kline, which was premiered at the 2022 Cannes Film Festival on May 24, 2022, and was released on August 26, 2022, where it received positive reviews from critics. For his performance he was nominated for an Independent Spirit Award for Best Breakthrough Performance.

== Filmography ==
=== Film ===
Year	Title	Role	Notes
2016	The Persian Connection	Young Behrouz	
2018	Eighth Grade	Riley	
2018	Ready Player One	High School Kid	
2018	Alex Strangelove	Dell	
2018	Fahrenheit 451	Clifford	
2019	Low Tide	Smitty	
2022	Funny Pages	Robert	
2024	Y2K	CJ	
2025	If I Had Legs I'd Kick You	Stephen	
2025	Lurker	Noah	
2026	Hot Water	Daniel	
TBA	My Darling California †	Kent	Filming

=== Television ===
Year	Title	Role	Notes
2013	Once Upon a Time in Wonderland	Mirza	Episode: "Bad Blood"
2014	Intelligence	Young Boy	Episode: "Red X"
2014	Scorpion	Young Walter O'Brien	3 episodes
2015	Weird Loners	Frank	Episode: "The Weirdfather"
2015	NCIS	Luke Harris	3 episodes
2015	Evil Men	Max Killas	Television film
2016	Speechless	Carter	Episode: "Pilot"
2017	No Activity	Mason	2 episodes
2020	Tales from the Loop	Jakob	7 episodes
2024	American Horror Stories	Declan	Episode: "Leprechaun"
