= Hedgehog (film) =

2017 American drama film

- Film poster
- Directed by: Lindsey Copeland
- Written by: Lindsey Copeland
- Produced by: Sally Northrop
- Starring: Madeline Brewer; Danny Deferrari; Robbie Tann; Jessica Renee Russell; Richard Toth; Ann Dowd
- Cinematography: PH O'Brien
- Edited by: Michael Gill
- Music by: Anthony Rossomando
- Production company: Fivelands Films
- Distributed by: Syndicado
- Release dates: March 6, 2017 (Cinequest Film Festival); December 4, 2017 (New York City)
- Running time: 114 minutes
- Country: United States

Hedgehog is a 2017 American drama film written and directed by Lindsey Copeland. The film stars Madeline Brewer, Danny Deferrari, Robbie Tann, Jessica Renee Russell, Richard Toth, and Ann Dowd. The film premiered at the 2017 Cinequest Film Festival.

== Plot summary ==
Ali is a young comic who longs to follow in the footsteps of her once well-known father. Unfortunately for Ali, her fear of suffering the same fate as her father prevents her from ever trying her hand at comedy. In the hopes of conquering her fears, Ali begins taking writing classes but soon finds that the additional costs force her to take a second job assisting a friend's neighbor, Joan, who is preparing to move out of her home.

== Cast ==
- Madeline Brewer as Ali
- Danny Deferrari as Sean
- Robbie Tann as Kyle
- Jessica Renee Russell as Amy
- Richard Toth as Darren
- Ann Dowd as Joan

== Production ==
Hedgehog was filmed on location in Boston, Massachusetts, in October 2015. Filming locations also included Portsmouth, New Hampshire, and Everett, Massachusetts. Filming took place over 21 days.
