= Max Walker-Silverman =

American director (born 1993)

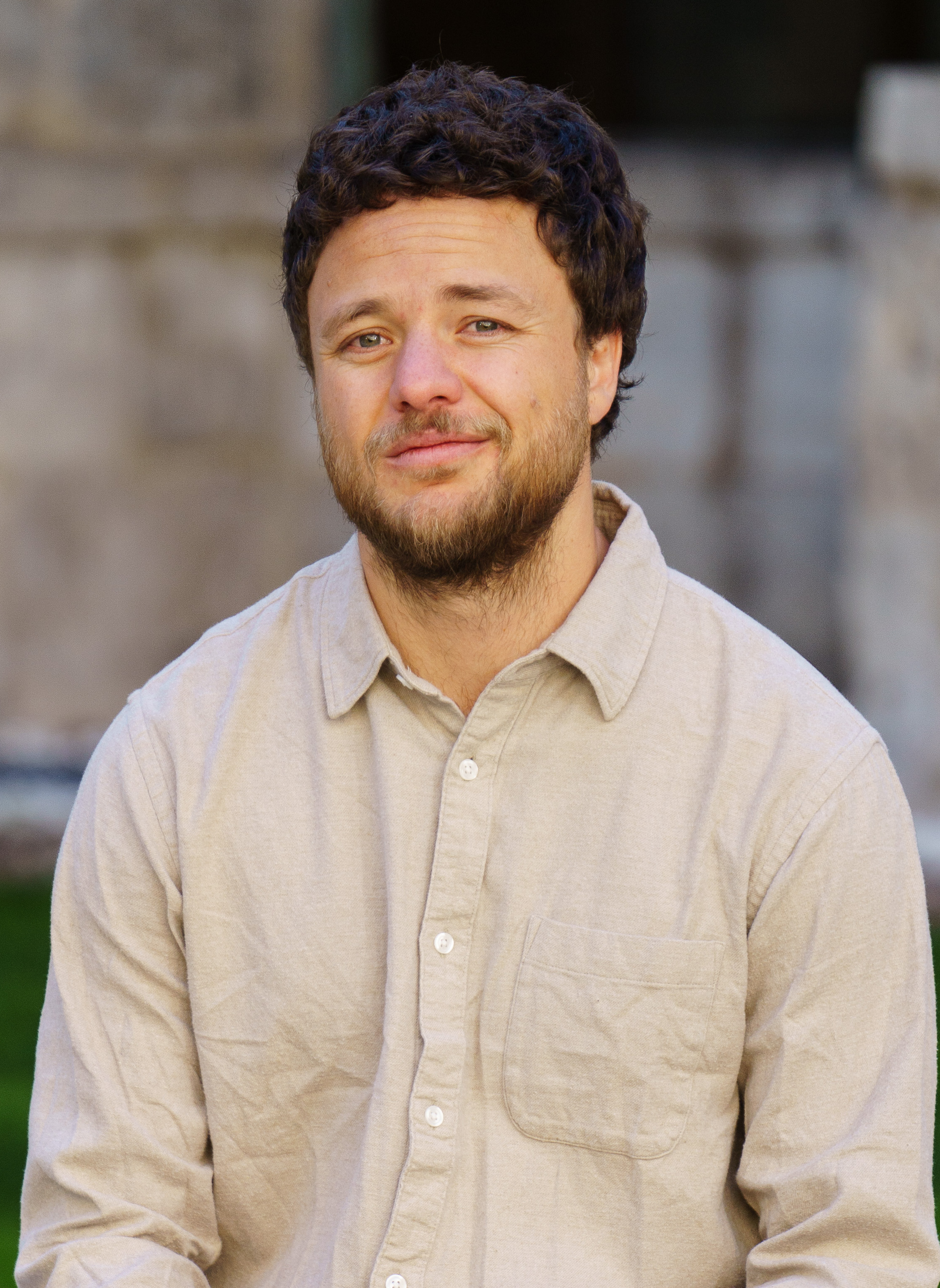
- Max Walker-Silverman at Valladolid International Film Festival 2025
- Born: 30 April 1993 (age 33)
- Education: Stanford University; Tisch School of the Arts
- Occupations: Director, screenwriter, producer
- Years active: 2017-present

Max Walker-Silverman (born 1993) is an American filmmaker. He wrote, directed and produced A Love Song (2022) and Rebuilding (2025).

== Early life ==
Walker-Silverman grew up in Telluride, Colorado. He attended Stanford University and the New York University Tisch School of the Arts.

== Career ==
Walker-Silverman directed the short films Get Away, which had its world premiere at the Raindance Film Festival. Left/Righty which had its world premiere at the Edinburgh International Film Festival and was awarded a National Board of Review Student Grant. and Chuj Boys of Summer which screened at the Hamptons International Film Festival and South by Southwest.

In 2022, Walker-Silverman made his feature-length debut with A Love Song starring Dale Dickey and Wes Studi, which had its world premiere at the 2022 Sundance Film Festival, and subsequently screened at the 72nd Berlin International Film Festival and Tribeca Festival. It was released on July 29, 2022, by Bleecker Street.

Walker-Silverman's second feature Rebuilding starring Josh O'Connor had its world premiere at the 2025 Sundance Film Festival.

== Filmography ==
=== Feature film ===
Year	Title	Director	Producer	Writer
2022	A Love Song	Yes	Yes	Yes
2025	Rebuilding	Yes	No	Yes
2026	Hot Water	No	Yes	No

=== Short film ===
Year	Title	Director	Writer	Producer
2017	Get Away	Yes	Yes	No
2019	Lefty/Righty	Yes	Yes	No
2020	Chuj Boys of Summer	Yes	Yes	No
