= Josephine (2026 film) =

Drama film by Beth de Araújo

- Theatrical release poster
- Directed by: Beth de Araújo
- Written by: Beth de Araújo
- Produced by: David Kaplan; Josh Peters; Beth de Araújo; Marina Stabile; Gemma Chan; Channing Tatum; Mark H. Rapaport; Robina Riccitiello; Crystine Zhang; Jordan Rapaport
- Starring: Channing Tatum; Gemma Chan; Mason Reeves; Philip Ettinger; Syra McCarthy
- Cinematography: Greta Zozula
- Edited by: Anisha Acharya; Nico Leunen; Kyle Reiter
- Music by: Miles Ross
- Production companies: Kinematics; Spark Features; Kaplan Morrison; Vibrato
- Distributed by: Sumerian Pictures
- Release dates: January 23, 2026 (Sundance); November 20, 2026 (United States)
- Running time: 121 minutes
- Country: United States
- Language: English
- Box office: $35,000

Josephine is a 2026 American thriller-drama film, written, directed, and produced by Beth de Araújo. It stars Channing Tatum, Gemma Chan, Mason Reeves, Philip Ettinger, and Syra McCarthy.

The film premiered at the U.S. Dramatic Competition section of the 2026 Sundance Film Festival on January 23, where it won the Grand Jury Prize Dramatic and the Audience Award Dramatic. It had its international premiere at the main competition of the 76th Berlin International Film Festival on February 20, where it was nominated for the Golden Bear. It was released on November 20, 2026, by Sumerian Pictures.

== Premise ==
After eight-year-old Josephine witnesses a man raping a woman in Golden Gate Park, she begins to experience fear and paranoia.

== Cast ==
- Gemma Chan as Claire
- Channing Tatum as Damien
- Mason Reeves as Josephine, Claire and Damien's daughter who witnesses the assault
- Philip Ettinger as Greg, a rapist
- Syra McCarthy as Sandra, a victim of sexual assault
- Eleanore Pienta as Kerry
- Michael Angelo Covino as Francisco Castellanos, a lawyer
- Dana Millican as Miss Hoffman, a lawyer

== Production ==
Beth de Araújo and her screenplay Josephine were selected for the 2018 Sundance Institute screenwriting and directing labs. The film was also the recipient of the 2021 Dolby Institute Fellowships from SFFILM during its development and later received the CAPE and TAAF Rising Filmmakers Finishing Fund in 2025.

Gemma Chan was cast in 2019. The project stalled due to the COVID-19 pandemic. In July 2024, Channing Tatum, Philip Ettinger, Syra McCarthy, and Mason Reeves joined the cast of the film. Reeves was discovered by de Araújo at the Clement Street Farmers Market.

Principal photography began April 2024 in San Francisco. The production participated in the San Francisco "Scene in San Francisco Incentive Program" administered by the San Francisco Film Commission.

== Release ==
Josephine premiered in the U.S. Dramatic Competition section of the Sundance Film Festival on January 23, 2026. It also screened at the 76th Berlin International Film Festival in the Competition section on February 20, 2026. In February 2026, Sumerian Pictures acquired U.S. distribution rights to the film in a seven-figure deal. The film was released in the United States and United Kingdom on November 20, 2026.

== Reception ==
=== Critical response ===
On the review aggregator website Rotten Tomatoes, 97% of 123 critics' reviews are positive, with an average rating of 8.6/10. The website's consensus reads: "Navigating disturbing material with a remarkably deft touch, Beth De Araújo's Josephine is a masterful drama that explores the ripple effects of trauma with empathy and outstanding performances." Metacritic, which uses a weighted average, assigned the film a score of 87 out of 100, based on 27 critics, indicating "universal acclaim".

=== Accolades ===
| Award | Date of ceremony | Category | Nominee(s) | Result | Ref. |
|---|---|---|---|---|---|
| Berlin International Film Festival | February 22, 2026 | Golden Bear | Josephine | Nominated | |
| Celebration of Cinema and Television | October 2, 2026 | Breakthrough Director Award | Beth de Araújo | Won | |
| Gotham Independent Film Awards | November 30, 2026 | Best Feature | Beth de Araújo, Josh Beirne-Golden, Gemma Chan, David Kaplan, Josh Peters, Jordan Rapaport, Mark H. Rapaport, Robina Riccitiello, Marina Stabile, Channing Tatum, Crystine Zhang | Pending | |
| Gotham Independent Film Awards | November 30, 2026 | Outstanding Supporting Performance | Channing Tatum | Pending | |
| Gotham Independent Film Awards | November 30, 2026 | Breakthrough Performer | Mason Reeves | Pending | |
| Montclair Film Festival | October 18, 2026 | Breakthrough Director Award | Beth de Araújo | Won | |
| Palm Springs International Film Festival | January 4, 2026 | Directors to Watch | Beth de Araújo | Won | |
| SCAD Savannah Film Festival | October 27, 2026 | Lumiere Award | Gemma Chan | Won | |
| Sundance Film Festival | February 1, 2026 | U.S. Dramatic Competition Grand Jury Prize | Josephine | Won | |
| Sundance Film Festival | February 1, 2026 | U.S. Dramatic Competition Audience Award | Josephine | Won | |
