= Emperor (2020 film) =

2020 American historical drama film

- Film poster
- Directed by: Mark Amin
- Screenplay by: Pat Charles; Mark Amin
- Story by: Mark Amin
- Produced by: Reginald Hudlin; Cami Winikoff; Mark Amin
- Starring: Dayo Okeniyi; Ben Robson; James Cromwell; Kat Graham; Keean Johnson; James Le Gros; Harry Lennix; Naturi Naughton; Mykelti Williamson; Bruce Dern
- Cinematography: Jeremy Rouse
- Edited by: Asaf Eisenberg
- Music by: Javier Navarrete
- Production companies: Sobini Films; Hudlin Entertainment
- Distributed by: Briarcliff Entertainment
- Release date: August 18, 2020
- Running time: 99 minutes
- Country: United States
- Language: English

Emperor is a 2020 American historical drama film directed by Mark Amin (in his directorial debut) and written by Amin and Pat Charles. The film stars Dayo Okeniyi, James Cromwell, Kat Graham, and Bruce Dern. It is based on the true story of Shields Green, an African American slave nicknamed "Emperor", who escaped to freedom and participated in abolitionist John Brown's raid on Harpers Ferry.

== Plot ==
In 1859, after the plantation on which Shields "Emperor" Green works in Charleston, South Carolina, is gambled away by his master, a cruel new overseer tortures Shields and whips his son Tommy. In retaliation, Shields kills the overseer and flees. Shields' wife Sarah is killed during his escape.

Shields evades capture on his way north and learns that a bounty has been placed on his head. His master and neighboring plantation owners hire bounty hunter Luke McCabe to catch him. Shields is found by Truesdale, who gives him refuge in his house despite his wife Delores' objection; however, the next day, Truesdale turns on him and forces Shields to lock himself in a cage, revealing his intention to wait for the bounty hunters to capture Shields for the reward money. Delores kills Truesdale and frees Shields, who takes the responsibility for the latter's murder.

Shields meets up with a young bank robber, Rufus Kelly. McCabe and his men pursue them and almost catch them, and Rufus dies from the injuries in the process. Shields takes his gun and looted money and meets up with Levi Coffin (a real Quaker abolitionist) at his cabin. There, he gives him the money to buy his son's freedom. After McCabe appears, Shields heads to Maryland where meets John Brown and Frederick Douglass, who is preparing the raid at Harpers Ferry. Shields agrees to join them to fight for the end of slavery.

Shields, Brown and his men take over Harpers Ferry. United States Army Colonel Robert E. Lee and his forces retake it and most of Brown's men suffer casualties. As Shields rides away on a horse, McCabe shoots and wounds him. Shields takes refuge at a church, but McCabe and his men track him down. During a gun battle. Shields climbs to the spire, pursued by McCab, he leaps into a river to make his escape. Coffin buys Tommy's freedom and takes him to Shields.

In 1890, his son writes a book about him and takes it to a publisher.

== Cast ==
- Dayo Okeniyi as Shields Green
- Naturi Naughton as Sarah Green
- Trayce Malachi as Tommy Green
- Keean Johnson as Rufus Kelly
- Ben Robson as Luke McCabe
- Bruce Dern as Levi Coffin
- James Cromwell as John Brown
- Harry Lennix as Frederick Douglass
- James Le Gros as Robert E. Lee
- Paul Scheer as Duvane Henderson
- M. C. Gainey as Randolph Stevens
- Nicholas Logan as Gunther Bowman
- Kat Graham as Delores
- Mykelti Williamson as Truesdale
- Brad Carter as Grady
- Samuel Lee Fudge as Henry
- Mark Ashworth as Reverend
- Nubel Feliz Yan as Esclavo

== Production ==
Emperor is the directorial debut of producer Mark Amin. Filming began on June 18, 2018, in Savannah, Georgia, and lasted for 28 days. Locations used included Fort James Jackson (as Harpers Ferry) and the Wormsloe Historic Site.

== Release ==
In January 2020, Briarcliff Entertainment acquired the film's U.S. distribution rights, and planned to release it in theaters on March 27, 2020. This release was canceled due to the COVID-19 pandemic, and the film was instead released on DVD, digital and video on demand on August 18, 2020, by Universal Pictures Home Entertainment.

== Reception ==
Emperor received mixed reviews. As of October 2021, 67% of the 15 reviews compiled by Rotten Tomatoes are positive, with an average rating of 5.5/10. Metacritic, which uses a weighted average, assigned the film a score of 39 out of 100, based on 4 critics, indicating "generally unfavorable" reviews.

Glenn Kenny of The New York Times gave a mixed review, praising the lead Okeniyi's acting while finding the plot to be "unimaginative" and the dialogue "tired".

Martin Thomas of Double Toasted put the film as his #1 worst film of 2020, describing it as poorly written and historically inaccurate.

On RogerEbert.com, Simon Abrams gave it one star, calling it toothless, insulting, inert, tacky, lousy, and mediocre. "It re-presents a dark period in American history without being inspired or insightful enough to be worth your curiosity or emotional investment."

== Historical accuracy ==
Shields Green had broken speech and was hard to understand; he may have had a speech defect. Douglass described him as "a man of few words". Shields Green actually met both Douglass and John Brown at the former's home in Rochester, New York, where John was visiting and working on his project. What Green was doing as a slave in South Carolina is unknown, but that he managed a plantation is very unlikely. In Rochester, living in Douglass's house, he worked as a barber and launderer. Green did not escape from the raid on Harper's Ferry. He was captured, tried, and convicted along with Brown for treason against Virginia, murder, and inciting a slave insurrection, and hanged two weeks after Brown. There is no evidence that Green saw his son again after he left South Carolina, nor that his son wrote a book about him. While the fact that he had a son is documented, that he had "sons" is not. The names of his wife and son are unknown.

== See also ==
- List of films featuring slavery
