= The Ultimate Playlist of Noise =

2021 American romantic comedy-drama film

- Official release poster
- Directed by: Bennett Lasseter
- Written by: Mitchell Winkie
- Produced by: Ryan Bennett; Jeremy Garelick; Michael Glassman; Mickey Liddell; Will Phelps; Marc Porterfield; Michael Schade; Pete Shilaimon; Nicole Stojkovich
- Starring: Keean Johnson; Madeline Brewer; Rya Kihlstedt; Ian Gomez; Bonnie Hunt; Emily Skeggs; Ariela Barer; Oliver Cooper
- Cinematography: Vincent Patin
- Edited by: Robin Gonsalves
- Music by: Erick Schroder
- Production companies: LD Entertainment; American High
- Distributed by: Hulu
- Release date: January 15, 2021
- Running time: 99 minutes
- Country: United States
- Language: English

The Ultimate Playlist of Noise is a 2021 American romantic comedy-drama film directed by Bennett Lasseter and written by Mitchell Winkie. The film stars Keean Johnson and Madeline Brewer.

The Ultimate Playlist of Noise was released in the United States on January 15, 2021, by Hulu. It received mixed reviews from critics, who praised the performances of Johnson and Brewer, as well as their chemistry together, but criticized the film's predictability and overreliance on clichés.

== Plot ==
Marcus Lund is a high school senior who is obsessed with music and sound. When he was a child, his older brother Alex saved him from their burning home, perishing in the process.

Marcus listens to all of the music Alex left behind. At a music gig, he falls for the singer, Wendy, who opens the show, but she leaves before he can introduce himself. At the gig, he has a seizure.

After testing, Marcus is told he has a brain tumor requiring surgery that will render him deaf. Depressed at the idea that he soon won't be able to hear his beloved music, he compiles a playlist of 50 sounds he wants to record.

After giving a presentation of his plan to embark on a cross-country road trip to record the playlist, his mother rejects his plan. Despite his mother's wishes, Marcus takes off in the car. As he drives away, Wendy suddenly jumps in front of the car, and he knocks her down. Undaunted, she gets up and jumps into the car, urging him to hurry.

Wendy's angry ex-boyfriend follows close behind on his motorcycle and tries to wrest her guitar from her. He manages to break two of the car windows and attempts to crawl through the passenger window before Marcus drives through a red light, and Wendy pushes him out.

At a diner, Marcus and Wendy introduce themselves. He tells her he saw her opener at the gig and that he is certain that one day she'll be very successful. He shows her his 50-item playlist, and she shows him her limited edition 1959 Starling Gold Fender Stratocaster.

On their way to NYC, they record many of the items on the list, including a thunder storm, a multitude of wind chimes, fireworks, and a perfect strike in bowling.

Arriving in NYC, they go to Wendy's aunt's place. Wendy heads off to her audition, while Marcus heads to the recording studio. There, he discovers that the fire that had killed Alex had actually been started by him; he had committed suicide.

Marcus confirms with his mother what he had learned about the fire. Later, returning to Wendy's aunt's, he discovers that Wendy is on her way Penn Station. There, he discovers that she had lied, there was no audition; she was planning to sell her guitar.

Marcus leaves, and persuades someone to buy him liquor. He empties his anti-seizure medication bottles randomly on the street. As he falls, his recording equipment ends up getting smashed by a passing car. While he's on the way to the hospital, Wendy finds the pills and the smashed tape recorder.

When Marcus' mother catches up with him at the hospital, she tells him that Alex had been bipolar. She drives him back home. Back in New York, Wendy struggles to get the tape recorder fixed, finally getting it done at Alex's friend's studio.

Back home, Marcus awaits the operation, a box with the repaired tape recorder and his brother's demo arrive from Wendy. She sends a recording wishing him a speedy recovery. The day of the operation comes and Marcus cherishes every last sound. Sending out his 'Ultimate Playlist of Noise' to all his contacts, he says he's now learning to appreciate the world with his other senses.

== Cast ==
- Keean Johnson as Marcus Lund
- Madeline Brewer as Wendy
- Rya Kihlstedt as Alyssa Lund
- Ian Gomez as Dominic Lund
- Bonnie Hunt as Dr. Lubinsky
- Ariela Barer as Sarah
- Emily Skeggs as Laura
- Oliver Cooper as Dennis
- Jake Weary as Benjie
- Carol Mansell as Aunt Delilah
- Carrie Louise Putrello as Ms. Richardson
- Gordon Winarick as Alex Lund

== Production ==
On November 1, 2019, it was announced that Keean Johnson and Madeline Brewer were cast as the leads of the film, with Bennett Lasseter directing from a screenplay by Mitchell Winkie, with LD Entertainment and American High producing, and Hulu distributing. Later that month, on November 22, it was reported that Emily Skeggs, Oliver Cooper, Ariela Barer, Jake Weary, and Gordon Winarick would also be joining the cast.

=== Filming ===
Principal photography occurred in late 2019 and wrapped in mid-December. The film was shot in downtown Syracuse, New York, which served as a stand in for New York City.

== Release ==
The Ultimate Playlist of Noise was digitally released by Hulu on January 15, 2021.

=== Critical response ===
On review aggregator Rotten Tomatoes, the film holds a 43% rating based on 14 reviews.

In a negative review, Adam Graham of The Detroit News wrote that the film is, “is a teen romance with no new material to offer.” Allen Adams of The Maine Edge opined that the film, “is well-intentioned and competently-made, but it simply can’t hit all the notes to which it aspires.”

Critics also noted the film's similarities to Sound of Metal, a film released less than two months before The Ultimate Playlist of Noise in which a drummer played by Riz Ahmed struggles to adapt to the sudden loss of his hearing.
