= Mason Reeves =

- Born: 2015 or 2016 (age 10–11); San Francisco, California, U.S.
- Occupation: Actress

Mason Reeves (born 2015 or 2016) is an American child actress. She made her film debut as Josephine in the eponymous 2026 film Josephine.

== Early and personal life ==
Reeves was born in San Francisco to a mother of Chinese descent and a father who is half Costa Rican. Reeves is trilingual and has three siblings.

== Career ==
Reeves made her film debut in the 2026 film Josephine featuring Channing Tatum and Gemma Chan portraying her mother and father respectively. Reviews of her have been positive and she has been nominated for Breakthrough Performer for the Gotham Independent Film Awards.

Following her breakout performance, she signed with TFC Management.

== Filmography ==
Film

Year	Title	Role	Notes	Source
2026	Josephine	Josephine	Feature film	IMDB
