= Greta Zozula =

American cinematographer

- Born: USA
- Occupation: Cinematographer
- Years active: 2009–present

Greta Zozula is an American cinematographer, based in New York City. She is best known for her work on Materna, Light from Light, The Half of It, and Never Goin' Back.

== Career ==
Zozula graduated from the School of Visual Arts joined the International Cinematographers Guild in 2013.

== Filmography ==
Year	Title	Notes
2010	Rojo	Short film
2014	The Immaculate Reception	Short film
2015	Dry Days	Short film
2016–2017	Nightcap	TV series
2017	Fry Day	Short film
2017	The Real Thing	Short film
2017	#LoveYourz	Documentary
2018	Never Goin' Back	
2018	Interior	Short film
2018	They Fight	Documentary
2018	The Art of Saying Goodbye	Short film
2019	Light from Light	
2019	Blue	Short film
2020	The Half of It	
2020	Becky	
2020	Materna	
2020	What Breaks the Ice	
2022	Summering	
2022	Soft & Quiet	
2022	Call Jane	
2026	Josephine	

== Awards and nominations ==
Year	Result	Award	Category	Work	Ref.
2014	Won	Emerging Cinematographer Awards	EC Award	The Immaculate Reception	
2020	Won	Tribeca Film Festival	Best Cinematography	Materna	
