= Where Are You (film) =

- Directed by: Valentina De Amicis; Riccardo Spinotti
- Screenplay by: Valentina De Amicis; Riccardo Spinotti; Matt Handy
- Produced by: Marcella Spinotti; Dante Spinotti; Kyle Stroud; Rocco Bovo; Heather Kritzer; Markus Bishop-Hill
- Starring: Camille Rowe; Irakli Kvirikadze; Anthony Hopkins; Madeline Brewer; Angela Sarafyan; Mickey Sumner; Ray Nicholson
- Cinematography: Dante Spinotti
- Edited by: Kyle Stroud; Rocco Bovo
- Music by: Leonardo Milani
- Production company: Carte Blanche
- Distributed by: Gravitas Ventures
- Release dates: November 22, 2019 (Taillinn); October 21, 2022
- Country: United States
- Language: English

Where Are You is a 2019 American thriller film co-directed by Valentina De Amicis and Riccardo Spinotti from a screenplay by Amicis, Spinotti, and Matt Handy. The film stars Anthony Hopkins, Camille Rowe, Madeline Brewer, Angela Sarafyan, Mickey Sumner and Ray Nicholson.

== Cast ==
- Camille Rowe as Matilda
- Irakli Kvirikadze as Nicolas Yarna
- Melora Walters as Edith the Gatekeeper
- Rita Taggart as Jeanne Yarna
- Mickey Sumner as Caroline the Agent
- Ray Nicholson as Cedric
- Brad Greenquist as Detective
- Madeline Brewer as Hannah / Kate
- Anthony Hopkins as Thomas Yorke
- Angela Sarafyan as Cassandra

== Release ==
The film premiered at the Tallinn Black Nights Film Festival in 2019 under the title Now Is Everything. The film subsequently screened at the Locarno Festival in August 2021. It was released by Gravitas Ventures on October 21, 2022.

Film poster using former title

== Reception ==
Alex Saveliev of Film Threat rated the film a 6 out of 10.

Matthew Joseph Jenner of the International Cinephile Society gave the film a positive review and wrote, "A meandering experimental drama set within the art world, the film exists at the intersection between art and existential philosophy, drawing inspiration from both areas and assimilating it flawlessly into the fabric of this enigmatic character study."
