= Low Tide =

- Theatrical release poster
- Directed by: Kevin McMullin
- Written by: Kevin McMullin
- Produced by: Rian Cahill; Brian Kavanaugh-Jones; Brandon McHugh; Richard Peete; Kevin Rowe
- Starring: Keean Johnson; Alex Neustaedter; Daniel Zolghadri; Kristine Froseth; Shea Whigham; Jaeden Martell
- Cinematography: Andrew Ellmaker
- Edited by: Ed Yonaitis
- Music by: Brooke Blair; Will Blair
- Production companies: Automatik; Boy & Star; Headgear Films; Metrol Technology; Neighborhood Watch
- Distributed by: A24; DirecTV Cinema
- Release dates: April 28, 2019 (Tribeca); October 4, 2019 (United States)
- Running time: 86 minutes
- Country: United States
- Language: English

Low Tide is a 2019 American drama film, written and directed by Kevin McMullin. It stars Keean Johnson, Alex Neustaedter, Daniel Zolghadri, Kristine Froseth, Shea Whigham, and Jaeden Martell.

It had its world premiere at the Tribeca Film Festival on April 28, 2019, and was theatrically released in the United States on October 4, 2019, by A24 and released internationally by DirecTV Cinema.

== Plot ==
In this atmospheric thriller set on the Jersey Shore, three teenage boys spend the summer roaming the town and boardwalk getting into small bouts of trouble, but after the discovery of a coin treasure the friends are sent on an escalating course of suspicion and violence.

== Cast ==
- Keean Johnson as Alan
- Jaeden Martell as Peter
- Alex Neustaedter as Red
- Daniel Zolghadri as Smitty
- Kristine Froseth as Mary
- Shea Whigham as Sergeant Kent
- James Paxton as Nate
- Danny Bolero as Javier

== Release ==
It had its world premiere at the Tribeca Film Festival on April 28, 2019. A24 and DirecTV Cinema distributed the film. It was released in the United States through DirecTV Cinema on September 5, 2019, before being released in a limited release on October 4, 2019.

== Reception ==
Low Tide holds a 72% approval rating on review aggregator website Rotten Tomatoes, based on 32 reviews, with an average of 5.8/10. On Metacritic, the film holds a rating of 64 out of 100, based on 13 critics, indicating "generally favorable" reviews.
