= Lurker (film) =

2025 film by Alex Russell

- Theatrical release poster
- Directed by: Alex Russell
- Written by: Alex Russell
- Produced by: Alex Orlovsky; Duncan Montgomery; Jack Selby; Galen Core; Olmo Schnabel; Francesco Melzi D'Eril; Marc Marrie; Charlie McDowell; Archie Madekwe
- Starring: Théodore Pellerin; Archie Madekwe; Zack Fox; Havana Rose Liu; Wale Onayemi; Daniel Zolghadri; Sunny Suljic
- Cinematography: Pat Scola
- Edited by: David Kashevaroff
- Music by: Kenneth Blume
- Production companies: High Frequency Entertainment; MeMo Films; Twin Pictures
- Distributed by: Mubi (United States and Canada); Universal Pictures and Focus Features (International)
- Release dates: January 26, 2025 (Sundance); August 22, 2025 (United States)
- Running time: 101 minutes
- Country: United States
- Language: English
- Box office: $688,460

Lurker is a 2025 American psychological thriller film written and directed by Alex Russell. The film stars Théodore Pellerin, Archie Madekwe, Zack Fox, Havana Rose Liu, Wale Onayemi, Daniel Zolghadri and Sunny Suljic. It follows a young man who secretly infiltrates his way into the friend group of the rising pop musician he is obsessed with and becomes overly attached to.

Lurker premiered at the 2025 Sundance Film Festival on January 26, 2025, and was released in the United States by Mubi on August 22, 2025.

Lurker received critical acclaim. It was featured on Variety's list of the top ten best films of 2025, with lead critic Owen Gleiberman saying, "Lurker has been made with the craft of early vintage Polanski crossed with an up-to-the-minute awareness of what pop culture has come to mean when the famous and their fans are now chasing each other’s tails."

== Plot ==
Retail worker Matthew Morning is employed at a popular Los Angeles clothing store frequented by rising pop musician Oliver, whom Matthew impresses one afternoon by playing an under-appreciated song he loves on the store’s speakers. Oliver gives Matthew a backstage pass to an upcoming concert and quickly befriends him thereafter, inviting him to join his entourage as his documentarian. Matthew is initially met with skepticism and resistance by Oliver’s friends but is eventually accepted as he begins contributing numerous visual elements to Oliver’s upcoming album cycle, ultimately quitting his job at the store.

Matthew himself soon becomes a well-known social media figure for his association with Oliver and is approached by his former co-worker Jamie, who is also a fan of Oliver’s and wants to meet him. Matthew reluctantly agrees and Jamie quickly becomes an additional member of the entourage as the group’s stylist, drawing the ire of Matthew. Oliver takes his entourage, including Matthew and Jamie, to London to accompany him at a concert. During the trip, an increasingly jealous Matthew makes several attempts to sabotage Jamie, culminating in him injuring Jamie by knocking him off of a ladder during a photoshoot. He is promptly shunned by Oliver and his friends afterwards.

After Matthew’s attempts to make amends with Oliver prove futile, he meet two underage fans of Oliver, whom he equips with backstage passes and discreetly records a sexual encounter between them and Oliver, who is under the impression that they are adults. Matthew subsequently blackmails Oliver with the footage and forces Oliver to allow him back into the entourage until he finishes a documentary about Oliver.

Matthew accompanies Oliver and his friends on tour, despite their visible discomfort, during which Oliver makes several failed attempts to retrieve the hard drive on which Matthew is keeping the footage of the encounter. Oliver also becomes disturbed by Matthew's increasingly invasive behaviour towards him. During a private recording session, Oliver attempts to convince Matthew that he truly sees him as a friend and deleting the footage is necessary to eliminate any tension between them. Matthew sees through this, refusing to be shut out again, and argues that the pressure is pushing him to be a better artist, which he knows Oliver deeply wants, and that Matthew is his first true friend because he isn’t simply a yes man.

Eventually, Oliver’s friends stop their tour bus in a desolate area and begin beating Matthew, allowing Oliver to access the hard drive. However, as he’s searching through it, he is able to see edited footage of the documentary Matthew has been filming during the tour, and appears to reconsider. Sometime later, Matthew’s documentary premieres at a film festival to an enthusiastic crowd, who applaud both him and Oliver together onstage. After Oliver answers questions, a young photographer in the audience tells Matthew he admires him and wants to be just like him, asking, "What do I have to do?" The film ends before he can answer.

== Cast ==
- Théodore Pellerin as Matthew Morning
- Archie Madekwe as Oliver
- Zack Fox as Swett
- Havana Rose Liu as Shai
- Wale Onayemi as Bowen
- Daniel Zolghadri as Noah
- Sunny Suljic as Jamie

== Production ==
In December 2020, the script was featured on the Black List. In March 2024, it was announced that Pellerin, Madekwe and several other actors were cast in the film. The film's score was developed by Kenny Beats.

== Release ==
The film premiered at the 2025 Sundance Film Festival on January 26, 2025, and was screened in February in Europe at the 75th Berlin International Film Festival in the section Berlinale Special Gala, where it will also be in competition for the Teddy Award.

In February 2025, Mubi acquired distribution rights to the film. Later that month, Focus Features acquired international distribution rights.

It was theatrically released in the United States on August 22, 2025.

== Reception ==
On the review aggregator website Rotten Tomatoes, 95% of 112 critics' reviews are positive, with an average rating of 8.0/10. The website's consensus reads: "Devilishly examining the intersection of fame and obsession to thrilling effect, Alex Russell's directorial debut delivers on all fronts." Metacritic, which uses a weighted average, assigned the film a score of 78 out of 100, based on 23 critics, indicating "generally favorable" reviews.

At the 41st Independent Spirit Awards, the film received nominations for Best Lead Performance (Théodore Pellerin), Best Supporting Performance (Archie Madekwe), Best First Screenplay (Alex Russell), and Best First Feature, winning the latter two.
