= Beth de Araújo =

American director

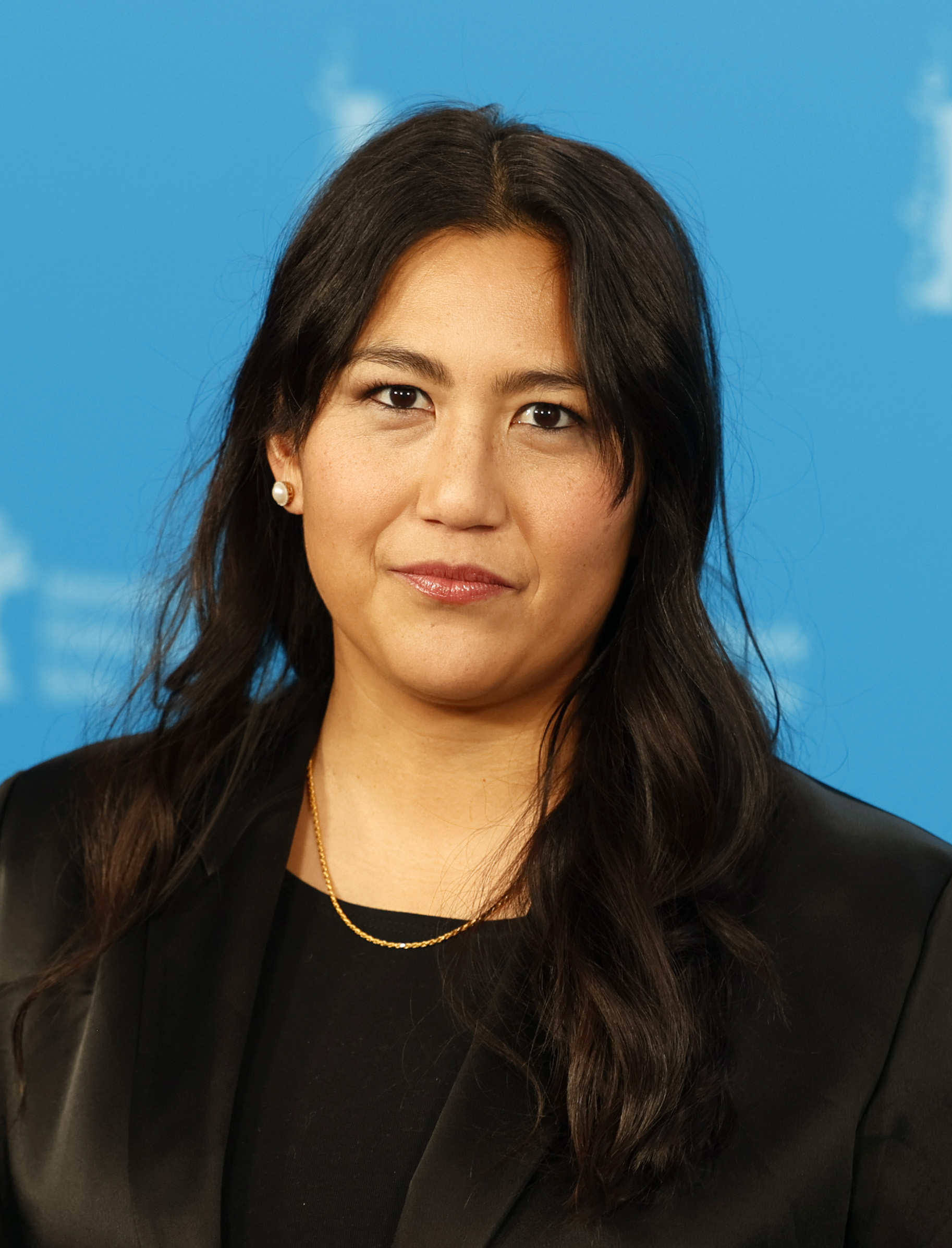
- Araújo in 2026
- Born: San Francisco, California, U.S.
- Citizenship: United States; Brazil
- Education: University of California, Berkeley (BFA); AFI Conservatory (MFA)
- Occupations: Director; screenwriter
- Years active: 2014–present
- Notable work: Soft & Quiet; Josephine

Beth de Araújo is a Brazilian-American filmmaker. She is best known for directing the films Soft & Quiet (2022) and Josephine (2026).

== Early life ==
Araújo was born to a Chinese-American mother and a Brazilian father, and she is a dual citizen of the United States and Brazil. She grew up in San Francisco, California. Araújo holds a Bachelor of Arts in Sociology degree from University of California, Berkeley and a Master of Fine Arts from the AFI Conservatory.

== Career ==
In 2019, through the AFI Directing Workshop for Women, Araújo directed the short film I Want to Marry a Creative Jewish Girl based upon a Gawker article she wrote.

In 2022, Araújo wrote and directed Soft & Quiet, which had its world premiere at South by Southwest and was acquired by Blumhouse Productions and Momentum Pictures and was released on November 4, 2022.

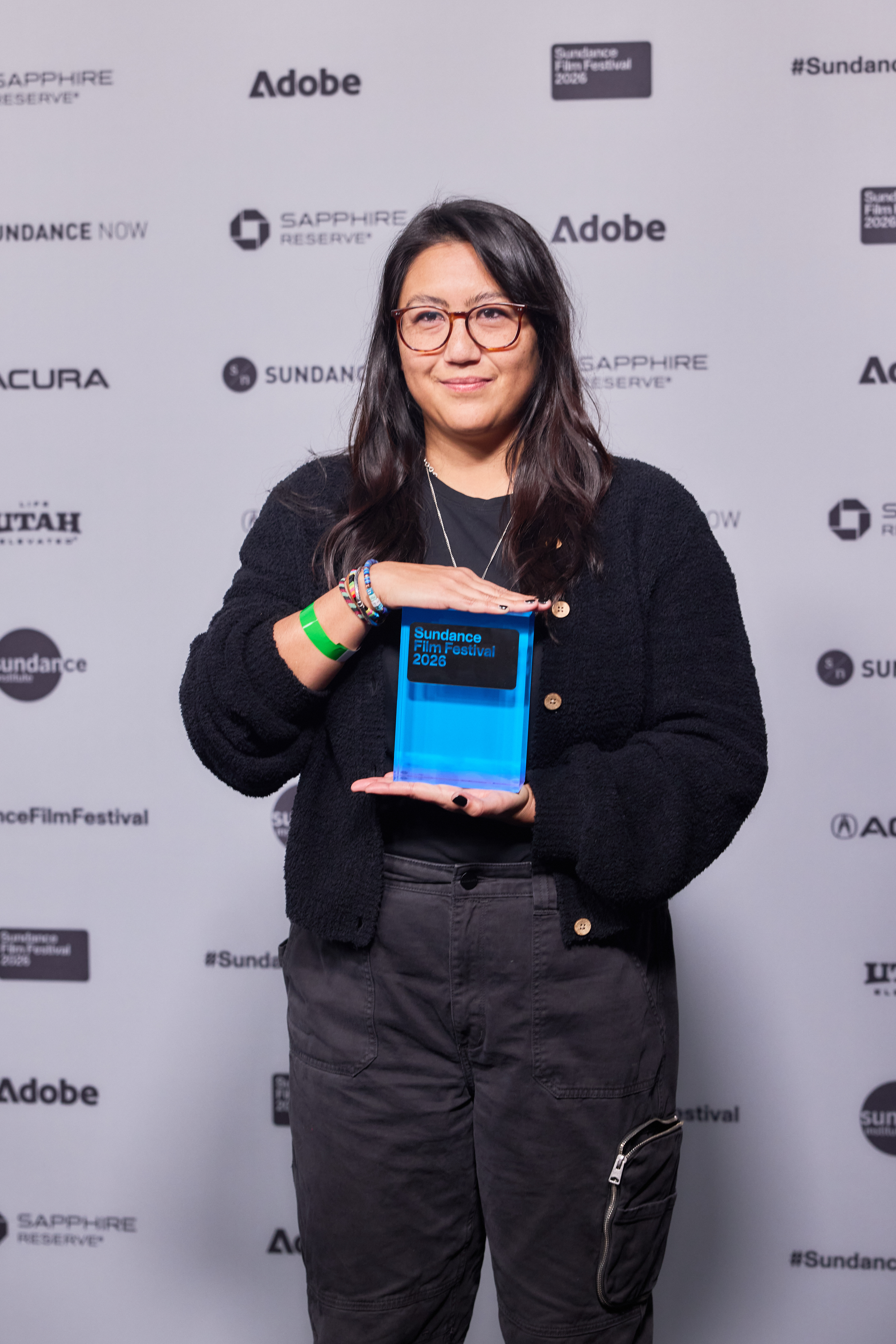
Araújo at the 2026 Sundance Film Festival

In 2026, Araújo's Josephine, which stars Gemma Chan and Channing Tatum had its world premiere in the U.S. Dramatic Competition section of the 2026 Sundance Film Festival on January 23, 2026. The film was awarded the Grand Jury Prize in the U.S. Dramatic competition and the Audience Award for U.S. Dramatic feature at the event. The film was previously selected for the 2018 Sundance Institute Screenwriting and Directing labs, SFFILM's 2012 Dolby Institute Fellowship, and the 2025 Rising Filmmakers Finishing Fund from CAPE and The Asian American Foundation. The project was initially set to be her directorial debut, but stalled during the COVID-19 pandemic. In February 2026, Sumerian Pictures acquired U.S. distribution rights to the film in a seven-figure deal. She was also awarded Crystal Award at the Women in Film Honors for the same film.

== Filmography ==
Short film

Year	Title	Director	Writer
2014	Brown Bag	Yes	Yes
2015	Initiation	Yes	Yes
2018	Chevy Chase	Yes	Yes
2019	I Want to Marry a Creative Jewish Girl	Yes	Yes

Television

Year	Title	Note
2017	My Crazy Sex	2 episodes

Feature film

Year	Title	Director	Writer	Producer
2022	Soft & Quiet	Yes	Yes	Yes
2026	Josephine	Yes	Yes	Yes
