= Madeline Brewer =

American actress and singer (born 1992)

- Brewer in 2026
- Born: Madeline Kathryn Brewer; May 1, 1992 (age 34); Pitman, New Jersey, U.S.
- Education: American Musical and Dramatic Academy
- Occupations: Actress, singer
- Years active: 2009–present
- Spouse: Jack Thompson-Roylance (m. 2025)

Madeline Kathryn Brewer (born May 1, 1992) is an American actress and singer. She is known for her recurring roles in the Netflix series Orange Is the New Black (2013) and Hemlock Grove (2014–2015), and for her starring roles as Janine Lindo in the Hulu series The Handmaid's Tale (2017–2025) and Brontë in the Netflix series You (2025).

For her work on The Handmaid's Tale, she was nominated for the Primetime Emmy Award for Outstanding Supporting Actress in a Drama Series. On stage, Brewer made her Broadway debut in 2026 in Becky Shaw, and has starred in several musicals including Little Shop of Horrors and Cabaret. Brewer's film credits include Braid, Cam (both 2018), and The Ultimate Playlist of Noise (2021).

== Early life ==
Madeline Brewer was born on May 1, 1992, and grew up in Pitman, New Jersey, the daughter of Laurie and Mark Brewer. At the age of eight, she starred in A Christmas Carol. While in high school, in 2009, she starred in the musical The Wiz as Dorothy Gale. She was crowned Miss Pitman in 2010, following her senior year at Pitman High School. Brewer is a graduate of the American Musical and Dramatic Academy in New York City.

== Career ==
Brewer made her television debut in 2013 with the recurring role of Tricia Miller in the Netflix series Orange Is the New Black. This was followed by a recurring role as Miranda Cates in Hemlock Grove, also on Netflix. In 2016, she appeared in "Men Against Fire", an episode of the anthology series Black Mirror.

In 2017, Brewer made her feature film debut in Hedgehog, appeared in Flesh and Blood, and began starring in the Hulu series The Handmaid's Tale as Janine Lindo. In 2021, for The Handmaid's Tale's fourth season, Brewer received a Primetime Emmy Award nomination for Outstanding Supporting Actress in a Drama Series at the 73rd Primetime Emmy Awards.

Brewer had leading roles in the 2018 psychological horror films Braid and Cam. This was followed in 2019 by supporting film roles in Captive State and Hustlers. She also appeared in the independent film Where Are You. In 2021, she starred opposite Keean Johnson in the Hulu romantic comedy The Ultimate Playlist of Noise. Later that year she appeared in Separation, and then in the 2022 film Space Oddity.

From October 2022 to January 2023, Brewer made her West End stage debut as Sally Bowles in the London production of Cabaret at the Playhouse Theatre. In August 2025, she made her New York stage debut in the Off-Broadway cast of Little Shop of Horrors at the Westside Theatre as Audrey.

In 2026, Brewer made her Broadway debut as the titular role in Becky Shaw at the Helen Hayes Theater.

== Personal life ==
In 2022, Brewer opened up about having an abortion at the age of 20, around the time she booked her first acting job in Orange Is the New Black, citing mental health struggles and focus on career as her motivation.

Brewer married British cinematographer Jack Thompson-Roylance on July 12, 2025.

== Filmography ==
=== Film ===
Year	Title	Role	Notes
2017	Hedgehog	Ali	Also executive producer
2017	Flesh and Blood	Maddy	
2018	Still	Lily	
2018	Braid	Daphne Peters/Mother	
2018	Cam	Alice Ackerman/Lola	
2019	Captive State	Rula	
2019	Hustlers	Dawn	
2019	Where Are You	Hannah/Kate	
2021	The Ultimate Playlist of Noise	Wendy	
2021	Separation	Samantha Nally	
2022	Space Oddity	Liz	
2022	Pruning	Sami Geller	Short film
2025	I Live Here Now	Lillian	
2025	Anniversary	Anna Taylor	
2027	Possession †		Filming

=== Television ===
Year	Title	Role	Notes
2013	Orange Is the New Black	Tricia Miller	Recurring role (season 1), 7 episodes
2014	Stalker	Claudia Burke	Episode: "Crazy for You"
2014–2015	Hemlock Grove	Miranda Cates	Recurring role (seasons 2–3), 10 episodes
2015–2016	Grimm	Billie Trump	Episodes: "Wesen Nacht", "Eve of Destruction"
2016	Black Mirror	Hunter Raiman	Episode: "Men Against Fire"
2016	The Deleted	Agatha	Web series; main role
2017–2025	The Handmaid's Tale	Janine Lindo / Ofwarren / Ofdaniel / Ofhoward / Ofjoseph	Main role Nomination – Primetime Emmy Award for Outstanding Supporting Actress in a Drama Series (2021)
2020	Acting for a Cause	Claudius	Episode: "Hamlet"
2022	Shining Girls	Klara Meiser	3 episodes
2025	You	Bronte / Louise Flannery	Main role (season 5)

=== Stage ===
Year	Title	Role	Venue	Ref.
2012	Liberty: A Monumental New Musical	Liberty	Regional, The Warner Theatre	
2022–2023	Cabaret	Sally Bowles	West End, Playhouse Theatre	
2025	Little Shop of Horrors	Audrey	Off-Broadway, Westside Theatre	
2026	The Disappear	Julie Wells	Off-Broadway, Minetta Lane Theatre	
2026	Becky Shaw	Becky Shaw	Broadway, Hayes Theater	
2026	Wild Rose	Rose-Lynn Harlan	Off-Broadway, New York Theatre Workshop	

== Awards and nominations ==
Year	Award	Category	Work	Result	Ref.
2018	Screen Actors Guild Award	Outstanding Performance by an Ensemble in a Drama Series	The Handmaid's Tale	Nominated	
2019	Screen Actors Guild Award	Outstanding Performance by an Ensemble in a Drama Series	The Handmaid's Tale	Nominated	
2020	Screen Actors Guild Award	Outstanding Performance by an Ensemble in a Drama Series	The Handmaid's Tale	Nominated	
2021	Primetime Emmy Award	Outstanding Supporting Actress in a Drama Series	The Handmaid's Tale	Nominated	
2022	Screen Actors Guild Award	Outstanding Performance by an Ensemble in a Drama Series	The Handmaid's Tale	Nominated	
2025	Gotham Award	Spotlight Tribute	The Handmaid's Tale	Won	
