= Space Oddity (film) =

2022 film by Kyra Sedgwick

- Theatrical release poster
- Directed by: Kyra Sedgwick
- Written by: Rebecca Banner
- Produced by: Richard Arlook; Jack Greenbaum; Mark Maxey; Mickey Schiff; Kyra Sedgwick; Meredith Bagby; Valerie Stadler
- Starring: Kyle Allen; Alexandra Shipp; Madeline Brewer; Carrie Preston; Simon Helberg; Kevin Bacon
- Cinematography: Alar Kivilo
- Edited by: Stefanie Visser
- Music by: Travis Bacon; Scott Hedrick
- Production company: Big Swing Productions
- Distributed by: Samuel Goldwyn Films
- Release dates: June 12, 2022 (Tribeca); March 31, 2023 (United States)
- Running time: 92 minutes
- Country: United States
- Language: English

Space Oddity is a 2022 American romantic comedy science fiction film directed by Kyra Sedgwick and written by Rebecca Banner. It stars Kyle Allen, Alexandra Shipp, Madeline Brewer, Carrie Preston, Simon Helberg and Kevin Bacon.

== Premise ==
A man tries to secure insurance in order to go on a one-way trip to Mars but falls in love with his insurance agent instead.

== Cast ==
- Kyle Allen as Alex McAllister
- Alexandra Shipp as Daisy Taylor
- Madeline Brewer as Liz
- Carrie Preston as Jane McAllister
- Christopher Jackson as Mike
- Kevin Bacon as Jeff McAllister
- Arden Myrin as Lisa
- Alfre Woodard as Dr. Sue Olsen

== Production ==
It was announced in June 2021 that Kyra Sedgwick would direct the film, written by Rebecca Banner, with Kyle Allen, Alexandra Shipp and Madeline Brewer set to star. In July, Kevin Bacon, Simon Helberg and Carrie Preston were added to the cast.

Filming began in June 2021, with production taking place throughout Rhode Island.

== Release ==
The film had its premiere at the 2022 Tribeca Film Festival on June 12, 2022. It was released by Samuel Goldwyn Films on March 31, 2023.

== Reception ==
On the review aggregator website Rotten Tomatoes, 56% of 27 critics' reviews are positive, with an average rating of 6.2/10. Manuel Betancourt of Variety wrote, "If the film never quite finds a way to marry its high concept premise, its twee romance, and its family melodrama into one cohesive narrative, it is not for lack of trying." Robert Abele of TheWrap wrote, "That’s a compelling set-up for a knotty family story, but not as evidenced by the surface cutes that keep real feeling at bay in this curiously uninvolving directorial effort from Kyra Sedgwick." In a positive review, Brian Orndorf of Blu-ray.com wrote, "[The film] isn’t an overly cinematic viewing experience, but it has deep feeling for its characters and an unusual approach to the trials of grief, going in compelling directions as the whole thing works hard to avoid becoming a melodrama."
