= My Darling California =

- Directed by: Elijah Bynum
- Written by: Elijah Bynum
- Produced by: David Hinojosa; Alex Coco; Sébastien Raybaud
- Starring: Chris Evans; Jessica Chastain; Mikey Madison; Chris Pine; Daniel Zolghadri; Don Cheadle
- Cinematography: Chayse Irvin
- Edited by: Leslie Jones
- Production companies: Anton; 2AM
- Countries: United Kingdom; United States
- Language: English

My Darling California is an upcoming crime thriller film written and directed by Elijah Bynum.

== Premise ==
Depicts the effects a singular crime has on several unconnected people.

== Cast ==
- Chris Evans as Jack Normandie
- Jessica Chastain as Sharon Normandie
- Mikey Madison as Jodie Taylor
- Chris Pine as Roland Pettigrew
- Don Cheadle as Cotton
- Daniel Zolghadri as Kent

== Production ==
It was announced in November 2025 that Elijah Bynum had set up his next film, with Jessica Chastain, Chris Pine, Josh Brolin, Mikey Madison, Don Cheadle and Charles Melton were set to star. In April 2026, Chris Evans joined the cast to replace Brolin, who had exited due to scheduling conflicts. In September, Daniel Zolghadri replaced Melton due to scheduling conflicts.

Principal photography began in California in September 2026.
