= Spooksville (TV series) =

- Genre: Horror
- Created by: Christopher Pike
- Developed by: Dan Angel and Billy Brown
- Directed by: Ken Friss; James Head; Michael Robison
- Music by: James Jandrisch
- Countries of origin: Canada; United States
- Original language: English
- No. of seasons: 1
- No. of episodes: 22

Production
- Executive producers: Harvey Kahn; Allen Lewis; Christopher Pike; Jillian Share; Gary Shaw; Jane Startz
- Producer: Harvey Kahn
- Production location: Victoria, British Columbia
- Cinematography: Michael Balfry
- Editors: Nicole Ratcliffe; Gordon Rempel
- Running time: 22 minutes
- Production companies: Front Street Pictures; Jane Startz Productions; Springville Productions

Original release
- Network: Hub Network
- Release: October 26, 2013 – May 17, 2014

Spooksville is an action/adventure fantasy children's horror live action television series that aired on the Hub Network from October 26, 2013 to May 17, 2014. The show is based on the book series of the same name. The show was produced by Jane Startz, who also produced Tuck Everlasting and Ella Enchanted. The show was adapted for TV by James Krieg.

== Synopsis ==
The new kid in town discovers that he holds the key to a battle between good and evil that has been taking place for centuries in a bizarre small town that plays host to a wide array of supernatural and unexplained occurrences.

== Cast ==
=== Main cast ===
- Keean Johnson as Adam Freeman, a teenager who moves to Springville along with his father. He discovers many secrets along with his friends, including one about his supposedly deceased mother, revealing that she formerly lived in Spooksville and is one of the few people who knows its strange and dark secrets. He eventually finds out that his mother is alive from Ann Templeton, through a magic spell.
- Katie Douglas as Sally Wilcox, a fearless and sarcastic girl, who also is trying to discover the many secrets of Spooksville, mostly the many reasons for the bizarre events that take place there.
- Nick Purcha as Watch Waverly
- Morgan Taylor Campbell as Ann Templeton, a teenage girl who lives alone in a manor called Shadowmire, along with her servant Moorpark. She is revealed to come from with a long line of witches, starting from the town witch Madeline Templeton, who, back in the era of the Salem Witch trials, was punished and cursed the entire town of Spooksville.

=== Recurring cast ===
- Samuel Patrick Chu as Brandon
- Steve Bacic as George Freeman
- Kimberley Sustad as Madeline Templeton, the witch responsible for cursing the entire town of Springville before her supposed execution.
- Peter Bryant as Moorpark
- Frank C. Turner as The Mayor
- Jacqueline Samuda as Mrs. Waverly
- Reece Alexander as Officer Dugan
- Harrison Houde as Stanley 'Scaredy' Katzman
- Glynis Davies as Principal Blackwater
- Patricia Harras as Dodie Wilcox
- Erica Carroll as Laurel Hall

== Episodes ==
No.	Title	Original release date
1	"The Secret Path (Part 1)"	October 26, 2013
A boy named Adam and his father move to Springsville (nicknamed "Spooksville" because of the bizarre goings-on said to happen) after Adam's mother disappears, and, after encountering a spider-lizard creature in his room, teams up with two kids, a girl named Sally, and a nerdy boy named Watch, who go back in time to 1771 to find clues about the town's origins and the possible disappearance of Adam's mom. Mystery: The Raven's Eye
2	"The Secret Path (Part 2)"	October 26, 2013
The gang goes back in time and finds a woman who could solve a mystery from the present. Mystery: The Secret Path, Madeline Templeton
3	"The Howling Ghost"	October 30, 2013
While solving a boy's mysterious disappearance, the gang encounters the ghost of a lighthouse keeper. Mystery: The lighthouse ghost
4	"The Haunted Cave"	November 2, 2013
Sally, Watch, and Adam go inside a mysterious cave that may be the key in finding out what happened to Adam's mother. Mystery: The monster cave
5	"The Evil House"	November 9, 2013
While trick-or-treating, Adam, Watch and Sally see a boy being pulled into the house. Later, as they step into the house they come to know that the boy was a magician from the past and the house was actually a portal to a world where it is always Halloween and everyone becomes their costumes. Mystery: The evil house
6	"The Thing in the Closet"	November 16, 2013
A monster who feeds on other people's nightmares appears in Sally's room. Mystery: The nightmare creatures
7	"The Fire Inside"	November 23, 2013
Thanks to Ann's magic powers, Sally experiences an illness called "The Fire Inside", in which she blows smoke out of her mouth and will die from the raging heat broiling in her body, so the boys must find a rare antidote known as "Crystal Moonflower". Mystery: The Fire Inside
8	"The Wishing Stone"	November 30, 2013
While on a hike, the trio find a mysterious object that can grant all their wishes, but when a robotic alien comes for his payment (which is slave labor on his home planet), Sally, Watch, and Adam must try to save themselves. Mystery: The Wishing Stone
9	"The Wicked Cat"	December 7, 2013
Sally finds a stray cat, who turns out to be a girl who was cursed, and she becomes human while Sally becomes a cat. Adam and Watch must call upon Ann again to help Sally. Mystery: Daniella, aka, the wicked cat
10	"The No-Ones"	December 14, 2013
Watch is not feeling very merry about the upcoming Christmas holiday but that all changes when he meets a girl who may be interested in him — for a plot to bring about an alien invasion. Mystery: The No Ones
11	"The Dark Corner"	December 21, 2013
Ann's attempt at helping Adam find his lost mother sends her and the trio into a parallel universe in which Springsville has been ravaged by an apocalypse. Mystery: The Dark Corner, zombies
12	"Shell Shock"	March 8, 2014
Sally's day with her family at the yacht club turns into yet another bizarre mystery when a giant mutant crab pirate begins attacking people. Mystery: Mutant crab pirate
13	"Flowers of Evil"	March 15, 2014
Everyone in Lizzie Borden High is brainwashed by a strange plant a science teacher found in the woods as part of his Internet documentary series and Sally and Ann (who hate each other) are the only ones who can stop it. Mystery: Hivemind plant
14	"Phone Fear"	March 22, 2014
During a survivalist trip at a logging camp, a strange fog begins picking off students one by one as they use their phones, and only Watch, Sally, and Adam can stop it. Mystery: The phone fog
15	"Critical Care"	March 29, 2014
When Adam takes his mother to the hospital after she sleepwalks in his room and collapses, Watch ends up there as well with a nasty case of tonsillitis, but things get weird when Watch's tonsils run off and the trio thinks the hospital's strange nursing assistant may be using removed organs for a sinister plot. Mystery: Living tonsils
16	"Blood Drive"	April 5, 2014
"Scaredy" gets bitten by a vampire and makes Watch, Sally, and eventually, the whole school into vampire slaves. Adam must team up with Principal Blackwater to find the master vampire and defeat it. Mystery: Vampires
17	"Fathers and Sons"	April 12, 2014
Adam, Watch, plus Adam's father, George, and Officer Dugan, go on a camping trip, where a hairy creature who may or may not be the legendary Bigfoot is raiding their campsite. Mystery: Bigfoot
18	"Gnome Alone"	April 19, 2014
Sally breaks her mother's lawn gnome and hides it, which causes the other gnomes in her yard to avenge its death. Mystery: Living gnomes
19	"Oh Monster My Monster"	April 26, 2014
Adam takes his driver's license test with a neurotic instructor who knows a little too much about dying behind the wheel. Meanwhile, Watch discovers the diary of Dr. Victor Frankenstein and Frankenstein's monster and revives the monster so he can use him to fight back against bullies. Mystery: Frankenstein, ghost driver's ed instructor
20	"The Maze"	May 3, 2014
Watch and Adam get stuck in a strange maze, and Sally discovers it has connections with the mayor and his fading memories. Mystery: Mayor Tippett's memories
21	"Run"	May 10, 2014
Laurel's memories are sparked. Adam and Ann run from homunculi, while Watch and Sally break into Shadowmire to discover how to defeat the monsters and accidentally discover a shocking truth about the Templeton family that Ann has kept hidden from them ever since Laurel was found. Mystery: Female Templetons, Laurel Hall's magical powers, homunculi
22	"Stone"	May 17, 2014
After finding out Laurel was actually Madeline Templeton bewitched by Ann, Adam awakens to a Spooksville that he does not recognize and Watch and Sally are not his friends. Mystery: The Raven's Eye, Adam's real mother

== Awards and nominations ==
Year	Award	Category	Recipient(s)	Result
2014	Young Artist Award	Best Performance in a TV Series - Leading Young Actor	Keean Johnson	Nominated
2014	Young Artist Award	Best Performance in a TV Series - Leading Young Actress	Katie Douglas	Nominated
2014	Young Artist Award	Best Performance in a TV Series - Supporting Young Actor	Nick Purcha	Nominated
2014	Young Artist Award	Best Performance in a TV Series - Supporting Young Actress	Morgan Taylor Campbell	Nominated
2014	Young Artist Award	Best Performance in a TV Series - Guest Starring Young Actor 11-13	Sean Michael Kyer	Nominated
2014	Young Artist Award	Best Performance in a TV Series - Guest Starring Young Actress 17-21	Tiera Skovbye	Nominated
2014	Young Artist Award	Best Performance in a TV Series - Recurring Young Actor 17-21	Samuel Patrick Chu	Nominated
2014	Young Artist Award	Best Performance in a TV Series - Recurring Young Actor 17-21	Harrison Houde	Nominated
2014	Young Artist Award	Outstanding Young Ensemble in a TV Series	Katie Douglas, Keean Johnson, Nick Purcha, Morgan Taylor Campbell	Nominated
