= Soft & Quiet =

2022 film by Beth de Araújo

- Theatrical release poster
- Directed by: Beth de Araújo
- Written by: Beth de Araújo
- Produced by: Josh Peters; Saba Zerehi; Joshua Beirne-Golden; Beth de Araújo
- Starring: Stefanie Estes; Olivia Luccardi
- Cinematography: Greta Zozula
- Edited by: Lindsay Armstrong
- Music by: Miles Ross
- Production companies: Blumhouse Productions; Second Grade Teacher Productions
- Distributed by: Momentum Pictures
- Release date: November 4, 2022 (United States)
- Running time: 92 minutes
- Country: United States
- Language: English

Soft & Quiet is a 2022 American psychological thriller film written, directed, and co-produced by Beth de Araújo in her directorial debut. It stars Stefanie Estes and Olivia Luccardi. Jason Blum serves as an executive producer under his Blumhouse Productions banner. The film uses long takes to have it appear as one continuous take.

The film premiered in the 2022 South by Southwest Film Festival in the Narrative Feature Competition. It was released on November 4, 2022, by Momentum Pictures.

== Plot ==
Kindergarten teacher Emily organizes the first-time meeting of the "Daughters for Aryan Unity", an organization of white supremacist women, which includes ex-convict Leslie, small grocer owner Kim, and disgruntled retail worker Marjorie. The members present have various grievances against immigrants, Jews, feminists, inclusion policies such as diversity quotas, and organizations such as Black Lives Matter. The meeting, held in a church, is cut short when the pastor, uncomfortable with the topic of the group, threatens Emily into leaving. To save face, Emily decides to invite the others to her home; Leslie, Kim, and Marjorie accept.

The four travel to Kim's store for food and drink. While Emily is selecting wine, Asian-American sisters Anne and Lily arrive. Unaware that the shop was closed, they attempt to purchase wine but are refused service by Kim. Lily confronts Kim for refusing service, causing Emily to intervene. Anne attempts to defuse the situation, only to be intimidated by Emily into purchasing the most expensive item available. As the two sisters leave, Marjorie initiates a verbal confrontation with Anne which degenerates into violence. Kim arms herself with a pistol and forces the sisters out at gunpoint; while leaving Lily taunts Emily about her brother, who is currently in a correctional facility serving time for raping Anne.

Emily's husband Craig arrives and attempts to defuse the situation, but Leslie, who is incensed, suggests going to Anne's home to vandalize the property and steal her passport. Craig initially refuses but is browbeaten by Emily into going along. Emily mentions small details about the house, such as Anne's living there alone and that she inherited it from her deceased mother. Craig tells Emily he is disturbed that she is keeping track of Anne like this.

The four women and Craig arrive at Anne's home and perform acts of petty vandalism before Kim finds Anne's passport. Before they can leave, Anne and Lily suddenly arrive home and discover the intruders. Confused and unsure of what to do, the home invaders bind and gag the sisters at gunpoint and discuss their options. Unable to condone the situation, Craig leaves.

Leslie suggests cleaning up the property to remove physical evidence of their presence and intimidating the sisters to keep them quiet. While drinking, Leslie and Marjorie beat the sisters and force-feed Lily various food and drink. Lily begins choking; the women remove Anne's gag and she explains that Lily has a peanut allergy. Leslie finds an epi-pen too late and Lily dies from the allergic reaction. The home invaders begin infighting; Kim and Marjorie want to leave immediately while Emily insists they need to remove the evidence. Leslie suggests making it look like a rape to make it seem less likely a group of women committed the attack, and then rapes Anne with a carrot while the other three women clean up the crime scene. Leslie then suffocates Anne with a pillow.

The four intruders dump all of their trash, cleaning materials, and Lily and Anne's bodies into a bag and leave the property. Arriving at a nearby lake, they head out on a boat and dump the bag overboard. After they leave, Anne, still alive, frees herself.

== Cast ==
- Stefanie Estes as Emily
- Olivia Luccardi as Leslie
- Dana Millican as Kim
- Melissa Paulo as Anne
- Eleanore Pienta as Marjorie
- Cissy Ly as Lily
- Jon Beavers as Craig
- Jayden Leavitt as Brian
- Shannon Mahoney as Jessica
- Rebekah Wiggins as Alice
- Josh Peters as Pastor
- Nina E. Jordan as Nora
- Jovita Molina as Maria

== Production ==
The writing of the film was inspired by the Central Park birdwatching incident; de Araújo has said that "the manipulation made me so angry". The film was shot in one continuous take over the course of four separate days with action starting at 6:34 p.m. as they wanted the outdoor discussion by the white women of what would happen to the two sisters to be at last light. The bulk of the film on screen comes from the fourth day of shooting.

== Reception ==
On review aggregator website Rotten Tomatoes, the film holds an approval rating of 84% based on 64 reviews, with an average rating of 7.7/10. The website's consensus reads, "A painfully timely horror-fueled thriller, Soft & Quiet forces the viewer to confront the ugly underbelly of modern American race relations." On Metacritic, the film holds a rating of 82 out of 100, based on 14 critics.
