= Troublesome Hollow =

- Origin: Bristol, Tennessee
- Genres: Bluegrass, Americana
- Years active: 1976–present
- Labels: Fat Dog Records
- Members: Tim White; Garry "Bear" Ollis; Donnie Ollis
- Past members: Ron Greene; Rick Moore
- Website: TroublesomeHollow.com

Troublesome Hollow is an American bluegrass and Americana band known for incorporating comedy into their musical performances, including a person wearing a possum costume, who interacted with audience members during the band’s early years. The band was formed in 1976 by brothers Donnie Ollis and Garry “Bear” Ollis, with the late Ron Greene on vocals and Rick Moore on bass. Banjo player and singer Tim White joined in 1978.

Troublesome Hollow recorded four albums and performed together, primarily in their native Eastern Tennessee, Virginia, and North Carolina until 1998, when they split up after Donnie Ollis moved to South Carolina for a job. White formed another band, The VW Boys. He also began hosting the nationally syndicated public television concert series Song of the Mountains, which airs on many PBS stations, and The Tim White Bluegrass Show on radio.

Troublesome Hollow reunited in 2015 and resumed touring. In April 2018, the band announced plans to release their fifth album, Old School on May 12. The album will reportedly feature the band’s core members—Tim White, Donnie Ollis and Gary “Bear” Ollis—with guest appearances by Steve Thomas on fiddle and mandolin, Tim Laughlin on fiddle and Tim Harkleroad on dobro.

== Personnel ==
- Donnie Ollis – acoustic guitar, vocals
- Garry "Bear" Ollis – upright bass, vocals
- Tim White – banjo, acoustic guitar, vocals
