= Rebuilding (film) =

- Theatrical release poster
- Directed by: Max Walker-Silverman
- Screenplay by: Max Walker-Silverman
- Produced by: Jesse Hope; Dan Janvey; Paul Mezey
- Starring: Josh O'Connor; Lily LaTorre; Meghann Fahy; Kali Reis; Amy Madigan
- Cinematography: Alfonso Herrera Salcedo
- Edited by: Jane Rizzo; Ramsi Bashour
- Music by: Jake Xerxes Fussell; James Elkington
- Production companies: Cow Hip Films; Fit Via Vi; Present Company; Spark Features
- Distributed by: Bleecker Street
- Release dates: January 26, 2025 (Sundance); November 14, 2025 (United States)
- Running time: 96 minutes
- Country: United States
- Language: English
- Box office: $153,326

Rebuilding is a 2025 American independent neo-Western drama film written and directed by Max Walker-Silverman starring Josh O'Connor, Lily LaTorre, Meghann Fahy, Kali Reis and Amy Madigan.

It had its world premiere at the 2025 Sundance Film Festival on January 26, 2025, and was released on November 14, 2025, by Bleecker Street.

== Premise ==
After wildfires take his ranch, cowboy Dusty winds up in a FEMA camp finding community with others who lost homes, after reuniting with his daughter and ex-wife.

== Cast ==
- Josh O'Connor as Thomas "Dusty" Fraser Jr.
- Lily LaTorre as Callie Rose
- Meghann Fahy as Ruby
- Kali Reis as Mali
- Amy Madigan as Bess Hadley
- Jefferson Mays as Mr. Cassidy
- Jules Reid as FEMA Official
- Binky Griptite as Derrick
- Nancy Morlan as Gertie
- Sam Engbring as Robbie
- Zeilyanna Martinez as Lucy
- David Bright as Art
- Taresa Ott Beiriger as Peggy

== Production ==
The film is directed by Max Walker-Silverman and produced by Jesse Hope, Dan Janvey, and Paul Mezey. The cast is led by Josh O'Connor and Meghann Fahy and also includes Lily LaTorre, Kali Reis and Amy Madigan.

Principal photography took place in July 2023 on location in Colorado's San Luis Valley.

== Release ==
The film premiered at the 2025 Sundance Film Festival on January 26, 2025. In April 2025, Bleecker Street acquired distribution rights to the film.

The film was in competition at the 59th Karlovy Vary International Film Festival in Crystal Globe Competition in July 2025. It also made it to the 'Meeting Point' slate of the 70th Valladolid International Film Festival.

== Reception ==
On the review aggregator website Rotten Tomatoes, 92% of 66 critics' reviews are positive. The website's consensus reads: "A taciturn drama that winds up having a lot to say about community and resilience, Rebuilding reaches great heights with Josh O'Connor's terrific performance serving as its rock-solid foundation." Metacritic, which uses a weighted average, assigned the film a score of 77 out of 100, based on 17 critics, indicating "generally favorable" reviews.
