= A Love Song (film) =

2022 American film by Max Walker-Silverman

- Theatrical release poster
- Directed by: Max Walker-Silverman
- Written by: Max Walker-Silverman
- Produced by: Dan Janvey; Jesse Hope; Max Walker-Silverman
- Starring: Dale Dickey; Wes Studi
- Cinematography: Alfonso Herrera Salcedo
- Edited by: Max Walker-Silverman; Affonso Gonçalves
- Music by: Ramzi Bashour
- Production companies: Cow Hip Films; Present Company; Dead End Pictures; The Sakana Foundation; Fierce Optimism Films
- Distributed by: Bleecker Street; Stage 6 Films
- Release dates: January 20, 2022 (Sundance); July 29, 2022 (United States)
- Running time: 82 minutes
- Country: United States
- Language: English
- Box office: $289,952

A Love Song is a 2022 American drama film written, directed, produced, and co-edited by Max Walker-Silverman in his feature directorial debut. It stars Dale Dickey and Wes Studi as two childhood friends who spend a night together by a lake in the mountains.

The film premiered at the Sundance Film Festival on January 20, 2022, and was released in the United States on July 29, 2022, by Bleecker Street and Stage 6 Films. It received positive reviews from critics and was named one of the Top 10 Independent Films of 2022 by the National Board of Review. It received two nominations at the 38th Independent Spirit Awards.

== Plot ==
A lonely widowed woman, Faye, waits at a campsite by a lake in the Colorado Mountains for Lito, her childhood friend whom she hasn't seen in years, to visit her. As she does not know when he'll be arriving or what he currently looks like, she passes the time birdwatching, stargazing, and encountering guests on other campsites. These include a polite group of siblings waiting for Faye to move so that they can dig up the coffin of their father in order to rebury him at a different location, and an engaged lesbian couple who invite Faye to dinner, during which one of the women, Jan, nervously asks her if marriage is worth it.

When Lito eventually arrives, they spend the day sharing memories, playing music and reminiscing about their deceased spouses. Lito takes a photo of Faye, which embarrasses her, as she would rather Lito remember her as she was when she was young and attractive. At night, after bonding over their shared sense of grief and admittance that they miss their respective partners, the friends sleep together. In the morning, Lito goes to gather flowers for Faye, but becomes overwhelmed with emotion. When Faye goes outside to greet him, he awkwardly thanks her for the invitation, but confesses that he cannot start a romantic relationship with her. Faye is hurt, but understands, and helps him leave.

Faye hikes alone across the landscape and appreciates the view of the stars at night, gradually coming to terms with her turbulent emotions and disappointments. In the morning, she visits Jan and advises her to get married and enjoy her life. Afterwards, she departs the campsite, driving away as the siblings from earlier begin to dig up their father's coffin.

== Cast ==
- Dale Dickey as Faye
- Wes Studi as Lito
- Michelle Wilson as Jan
- Benja Kay Thomas as Marie

== Production ==
A Love Song was written, directed, and produced by Max Walker-Silverman in his feature debut. Noting the minimal dialogue, the filmmaker said he "gave these characters the gift of silence with the knowledge that these roles would be played by two masters."

== Release ==
The film premiered at the Sundance Film Festival on January 20, 2022. It showed at the 72nd Berlin International Film Festival on February 12, 2022, and at the Tribeca Film Festival on June 13, 2022.

In January 2022, Cinetic Media acquired the film's sales rights in the United States and Canada. The following month, Bleecker Street and Stage 6 Films acquired worldwide distribution rights to the film, planning a summer release for the film. It was released in theaters in the United States on July 29, 2022.

== Reception ==
On the review aggregator website Rotten Tomatoes, 95% of 102 critics' reviews are positive, with an average rating of 7.7/10. The website's consensus reads: "Providing a brilliant (and too-rare) showcase for veteran actors Dale Dickey and Wes Studi, A Love Song tells a small, stirring tale with quiet grace." Metacritic, which uses a weighted average, assigned the film a score of 78 out of 100, based on 25 critics, indicating "generally favorable" reviews.
