= Kaitlyn Baker =

American country singer-songwriter

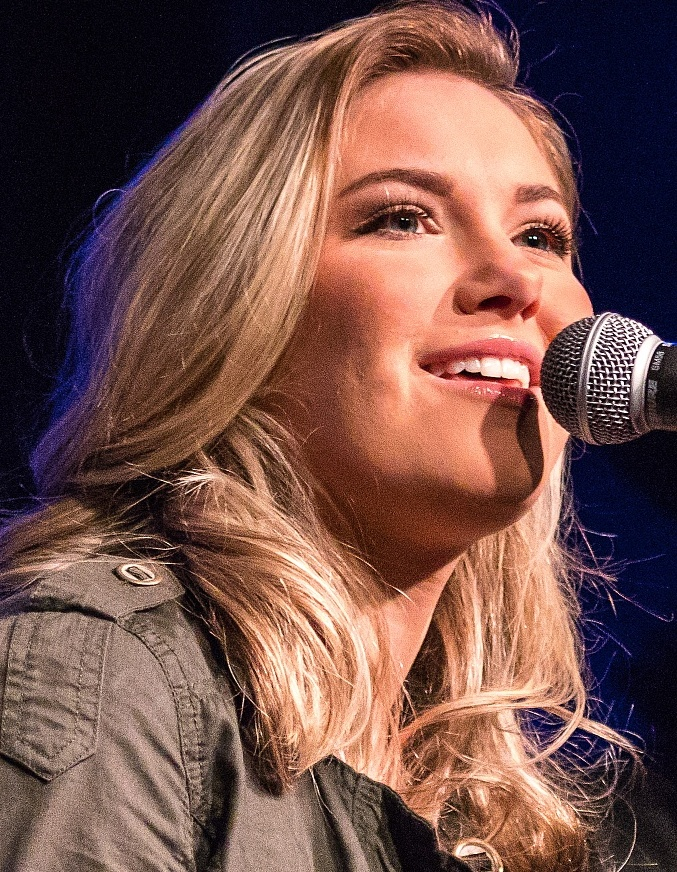
- Baker performing in November 2016.

Background information
- Born: Kaitlyn Adrianna Baker; November 23, 1994 (age 31); Pound, Virginia, U.S.
- Genres: Country
- Occupation: Singer, songwriter
- Instrument: Vocals, guitar, mandolin
- Years active: 2014–present
- Labels: Independent
- Website: kaitlynbaker.com

Kaitlyn Adrianna Baker (born November 23, 1994) is an American country singer and songwriter.

== Early life ==
Kaitlyn Adrianna Baker was born and raised in Pound, Virginia. Her father, grandfather and other family members worked in coal mines. Virginia Living magazine referred to her as a new "coal miner's daughter." Baker started singing in church and then professionally as a young girl at events in her area.

== Career ==
Baker's debut single, "Burn", reached number fifty four on the MusicRow Breakout Chart in 2015, and inspired the creation of Kaitlyn Baker's BURN Sauce, a hot sauce produced by Pepper Palace in Sevierville, Tennessee. Baker has said that the song, which is about a woman who gets revenge on her cheating husband, was loosely based on something that happened to her grandmother.

In March 2015, her ballad, "Coal Train", was included on the 2015 ACM Awards ZinePak, a 2-CD album released by the Academy of Country Music and distributed exclusively through Walmart. The album debuted at number four on the Billboard Country Albums chart.

In November 2015, Baker released a cover of the classic Christmas song "Rockin' Around the Christmas Tree" in association with The Mansion Entertainment, a Nashville-based record label.

In June 2016, she released "Heart of Appalachia," a song about her native Southwest Virginia. In a review, music critic Tom Netherland wrote, "Southwest Virginia glows in Baker's song." "Heart of Appalachia" was designated the official theme song of the Heart of Appalachia Tourism Authority, a nonprofit organization that promotes tourism in the region. An accompanying music video included cameo appearances by prominent bluegrass artists Ralph Stanley II and Larry Cordle. Cordle co-produced and sang background vocals on the record. Songwriter and musician Scott Arnold, who wrote the song with Baker, produced the music tracks.

In September 2016, Baker released her single "To Pieces" to country radio. An accompanying music video premiered on The Heartland Network, a national cable and satellite television channel.

A member of Baker's band, guitarist Thomas Estep, was killed in a drunk-driving incident on January 1, 2017, when another vehicle crossed over the center line and collided with his vehicle on a Virginia highway. As a result of the crash, Baker partnered with Mothers Against Drunk Driving to perform at the annual MADD Law Enforcement Recognition Banquet in Southwest Virginia. She also announced that she was working on a new EP titled "Blackbird," which she planned to dedicate in Estep's memory.

Baker released her EP "Blackbird" in April, 2018, with performances in Big Stone Gap, Virginia, and Gate City, Virginia. One song on the project, "Sassyfras Tea," was co-written by Baker and acclaimed country songwriters Tony Mullins and Larry Cordle. The pop culture website BuzzFeed listed her among eleven "Badass Alternatives to Bro Country."

Notable appearances by Baker include Country Jam Colorado, the Riverbend Festival in Chattanooga, Tennessee, the Young Artist Awards in Los Angeles, California, the Findlay Market – Cincinnati Reds Opening Day parade, and "Song of the Mountains", a nationally syndicated public television concert series. In concert, she has opened for popular artists including Craig Morgan, Jim Lauderdale, Travis Tritt, Billy Currington, Chase Bryant, Rhonda Vincent, and others.
