= Keean Johnson =

American actor (born 1997)

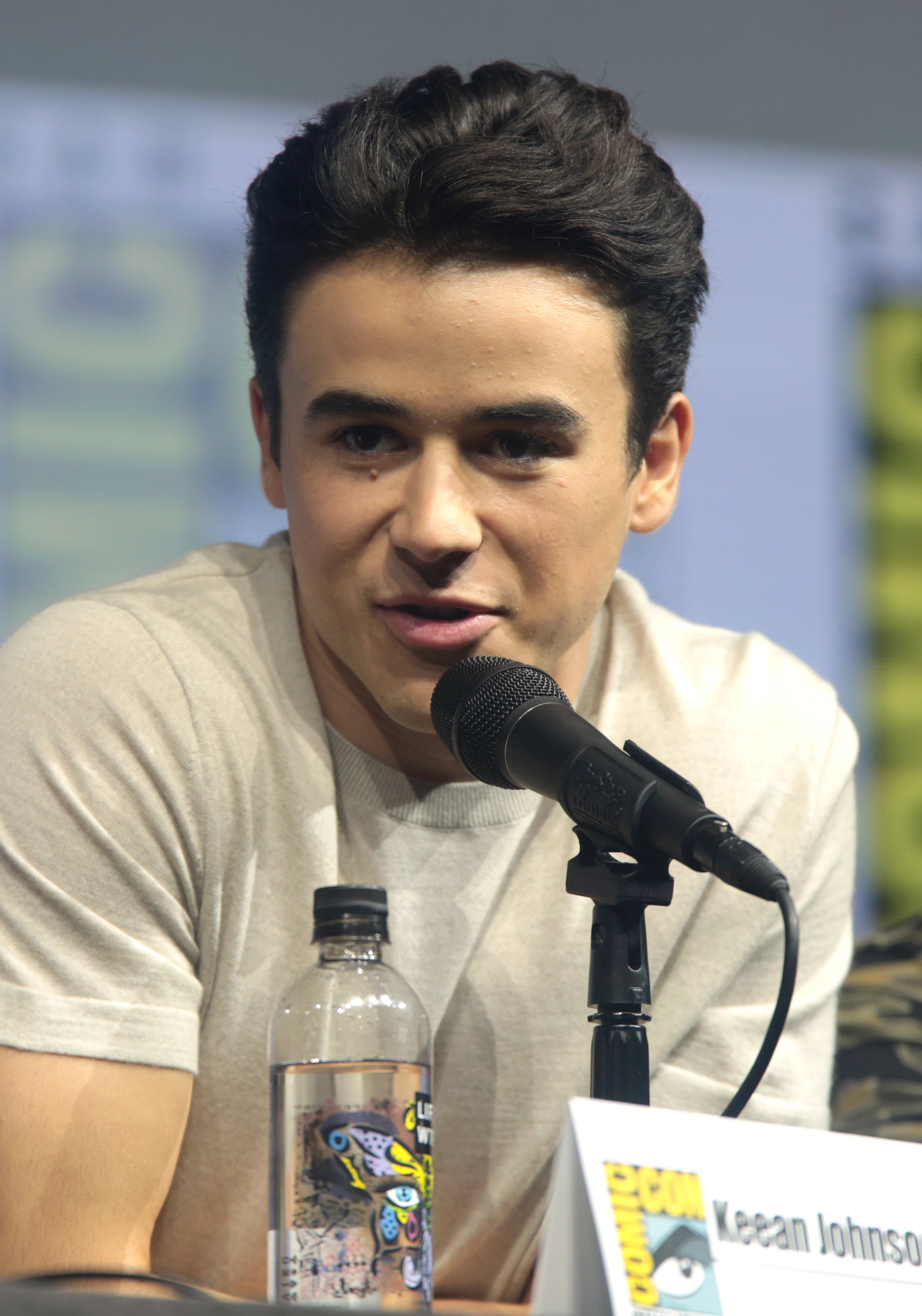
- Johnson at the 2018 San Diego Comic-Con
- Born: October 25, 1996 (age 30); Boulder, Colorado, U.S.
- Occupation: Actor
- Years active: 2013–present

Keean Johnson (born c. October 25, 1997) is an American actor who is known for his lead role as Adam Freeman in action horror adventure series Spooksville (2013–2014).

Johnson played one of the lead roles, Hugo, in the film Alita: Battle Angel (2019). He is also known for his lead role in the films Low Tide (2019) and The Ultimate Playlist of Noise (2021).

== Early life ==
Johnson was born and raised in Boulder, Colorado. His father is British and his mother is American-Chilean. He has a younger brother, Cade Johnson. His first professional acting debut came at the age of 11 at the Denver Center for Performing Arts in the play Plainsong. It was at this same time that the casting director Nora Brennan for the Broadway musical Billy Elliot cast him in the show which went on to win the Tony for Best Musical in 2008.

== Acting career ==
=== Television ===
Johnson began his professional acting career as an actor at the age of 16, when he appeared in episodic roles in the television shows: Switched at Birth, Notorious and Joe Pickett.

Johnson made his television debut in 2013, he was cast to play the lead role of Adam Freeman in the action horror adventure series Spooksville alongside Katie Douglas, Nick Purcha and Morgan Taylor Campbell, based on Christopher Pike's novel of the same name, which that aired on the Hub Network from late 2013 to 2014.

From 2014 to 2016, Johnson played the recurring role of Colt Wheeler in the musical drama show Nashville.

In 2015, Johnson appeared on the third season of the family drama series The Fosters, which he played the role of Tony. Johnson appeared on the second season in the teen drama web series Guidance, he played the main role of Kyo 'Ozo' Ozonaka, which was second season released in late 2016. Johnson appeared on the first season of the teen drama series Euphoria, which he played the recurring role of Daniel, based on the Israeli miniseries of the same name.

In 2023, Johnson was cast to play the main role of Vernon Howell in the crime drama miniseries Waco: The Aftermath, developed by John Erick Dowdle and Drew Dowdle, which was premiered in the first half of 2023, on Showtime.

=== Film ===
In 2016, Johnson made his feature film debut in the comedy-drama film Heritage Falls starring David Keith, he played the role of Markie Fitzpatrick, which was released in the second half of 2016. Johnson's break-out role came in 2019, when he played the role of Hugo in the cyberpunk action film Alita: Battle Angel starring Rosa Salazar, directed by Robert Rodriguez, based on Yukito Kishiro's manga series Gunnm, which was world premiere at the Odeon Leicester Square in London on January 31, 2019 and released in early 2019.

Johnson also co-starred Alexandra Daddario, Maddie Hasson, Amy Forsyth, Logan Miller and Austin Swift in the horror thriller film We Summon the Darkness, directed by Marc Meyers and written by Alan Trezza, which was premiered at Mammoth Film Festival in early 2019, and was released in digital and on-demand in the United States in the first half of 2020, by Saban Films.

Johnson starred alongside Jaeden Martell, Alex Neustaedter and Kristine Froseth in the 2019 drama film Low Tide, directed by Kevin McMullin, which he played the lead role, which was premiere at the Tribeca Film Festival in the first half of 2019 and was theatrically released in late 2019.

Johnson played the role of Chief Aviation Radioman James Murray in the war film Midway directed by Roland Emmerich, which was released in late 2019.

In 2020, Johnson played Rufus Kelly in the historical drama film Emperor stars Dayo Okeniyi, James Cromwell, Kat Graham, and Bruce Dern, directed by Mark Amin, which was released in mid-2020. On the same year, he appeared in the heist film Cut Throat City directed by RZA, which was released in mid-2020, by Well Go USA Entertainment.

Johnson starred in the romantic comedy-drama film by Bennett Lasseter titled The Ultimate Playlist of Noise with Madeline Brewer, which was released in early 2021.

== Filmography ==
=== Film ===
| Year | Title | Role | Notes |
|---|---|---|---|
| 2016 | Heritage Falls | Markie Fitzpatrick | |
| 2019 | Alita: Battle Angel | Hugo | |
| 2019 | Low Tide | Alan | |
| 2019 | We Summon the Darkness | Mark | |
| 2019 | Midway | James Murray | |
| 2020 | Emperor | Rufus Kelly | |
| 2020 | Cut Throat City | Junior | |
| 2021 | The Ultimate Playlist of Noise | Marcus | |

=== Television ===
| Year | Title | Role | Notes |
|---|---|---|---|
| 2013 | Spooksville Freak Files | Adam Freeman | Web series |
| 2013–2014 | Spooksville | Adam Freeman | Main role |
| 2014 | Switched at Birth | Angelo 'A.J.' Sorrento Jr. | Episode: "Yuletide Fortune Tellers" |
| 2014–2016 | Nashville | Colt Wheeler | Recurring role, 22 episodes |
| 2015 | The Fosters | Tony | Recurring role, 6 episodes |
| 2016 | Notorious | Finn | Episode: "Tell Me a Secret" |
| 2016 | Guidance | Ozo | Main role (season 2) |
| 2019 | Euphoria | Daniel | Recurring role, 6 episodes |
| 2023 | Joe Pickett | Luke Brueggeman | Main role (season 2) |
| 2023 | Waco: The Aftermath | Vernon Howell | 5 episodes |

== Awards and nominations ==
| Year | Award | Category | Work | Result |
|---|---|---|---|---|
| 2013 | Young Artist Award | Best Performance in a TV Series – Supporting Young Actor | Spooksville | Nominated |
| 2013 | Young Artist Award | Outstanding Young Ensemble in a TV Series | Spooksville | Nominated |
