= 20th Cinema Eye Honors =

- Date: January 11, 2027
- Location: New York City

Highlights
- Most nominations: Film: You Can See Everything / American Doctor (7); Broadcast: Bang My Box: The Robin Byrd Story / Earth, Wind & Fire (To Be Celestial vs That's the Weight of the World) / Katrina: Come Hell and High Water / Mr. Scorsese / High Horse: The Black Cowboy / Songs from the Hole / Tucci in Italy / The Yogurt Shop Murders (2)
- Website: cinemaeyehonors.com

The 20th Cinema Eye Honors, destined to recognize outstanding artistry and craft in nonfiction filmmaking of 2026, is scheduled to take place on January 11, 2027. The ceremony will be held in New York City, at a venue yet to be announced.

The broadcast categories as well as the Short Films shortlist, the Audience Choice Prize longlist and the recipients for The Unforgettables, were announced on October 22, 2026. Bang My Box: The Robin Byrd Story, Earth, Wind & Fire (To Be Celestial vs That's the Weight of the World), Katrina: Come Hell and High Water, Mr. Scorsese, High Horse: The Black Cowboy, Songs from the Hole, Tucci in Italy, and The Yogurt Shop Murders, all led the broadcast categories with two nominations each.

As per usual, the nominations for the film categories were announced later, on November 12, 2026. You Can See Everything and American Doctor led the film nominations with seven each, followed by Time and Water with six. You Can See Everything made Cinema Eye History as the first film to be nominated for Nonfiction Feature, Direction, Editing, Production, Cinematography, and Original Score. The award for Outstanding Achievement in Archival Artistry was introduced. Similarly, the five nominees from the Short Films shortlist will be revealed on December 14.

The Legacy Award will be given to the 1994 documentary film Hoop Dreams, directed by Steve James, which follows the lives of two African-American high schoolers who dream of becoming professional basketball players.

== Winners and nominees ==
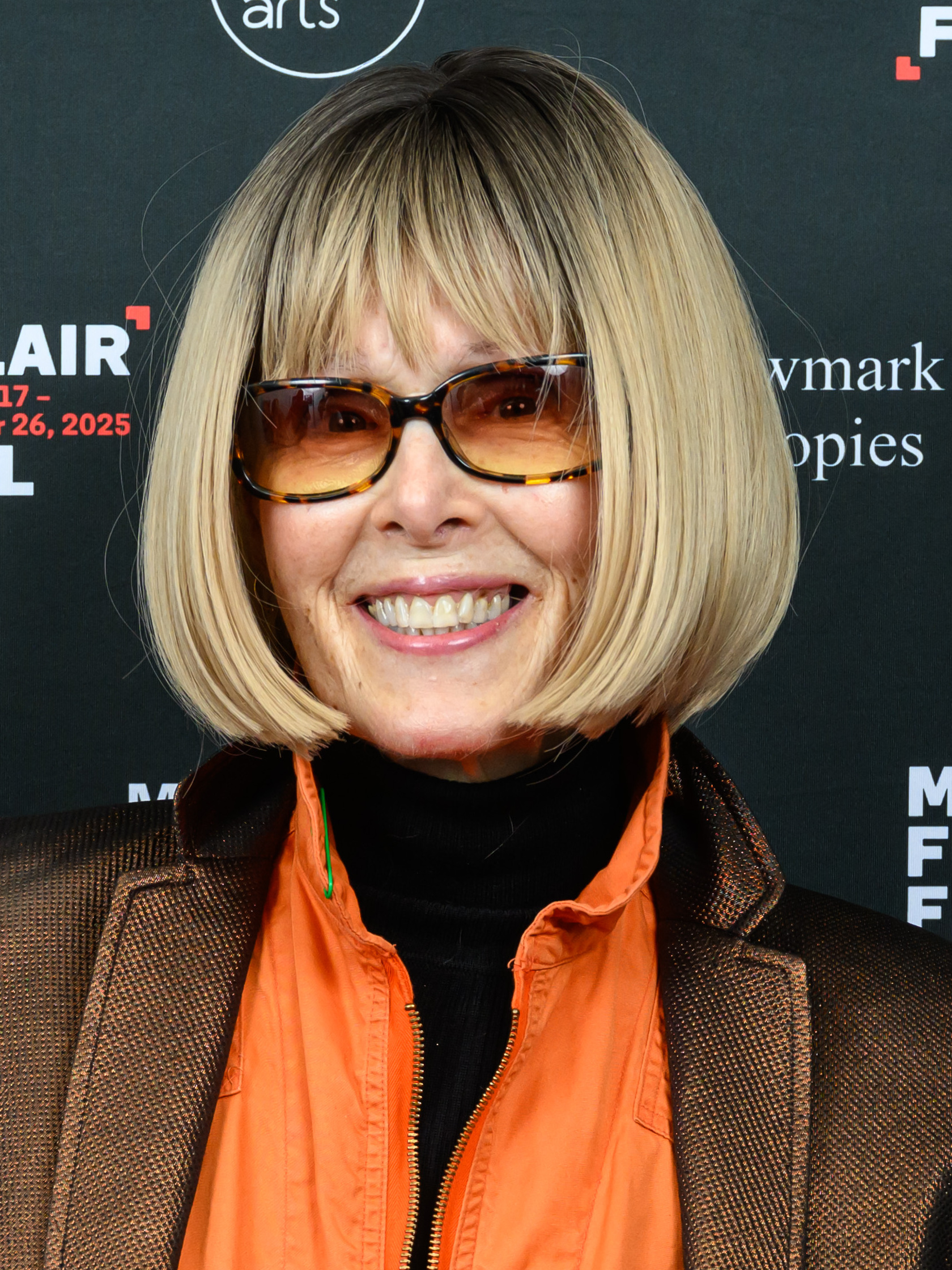
American journalist E. Jean Carroll was one of The Unforgettables honorees

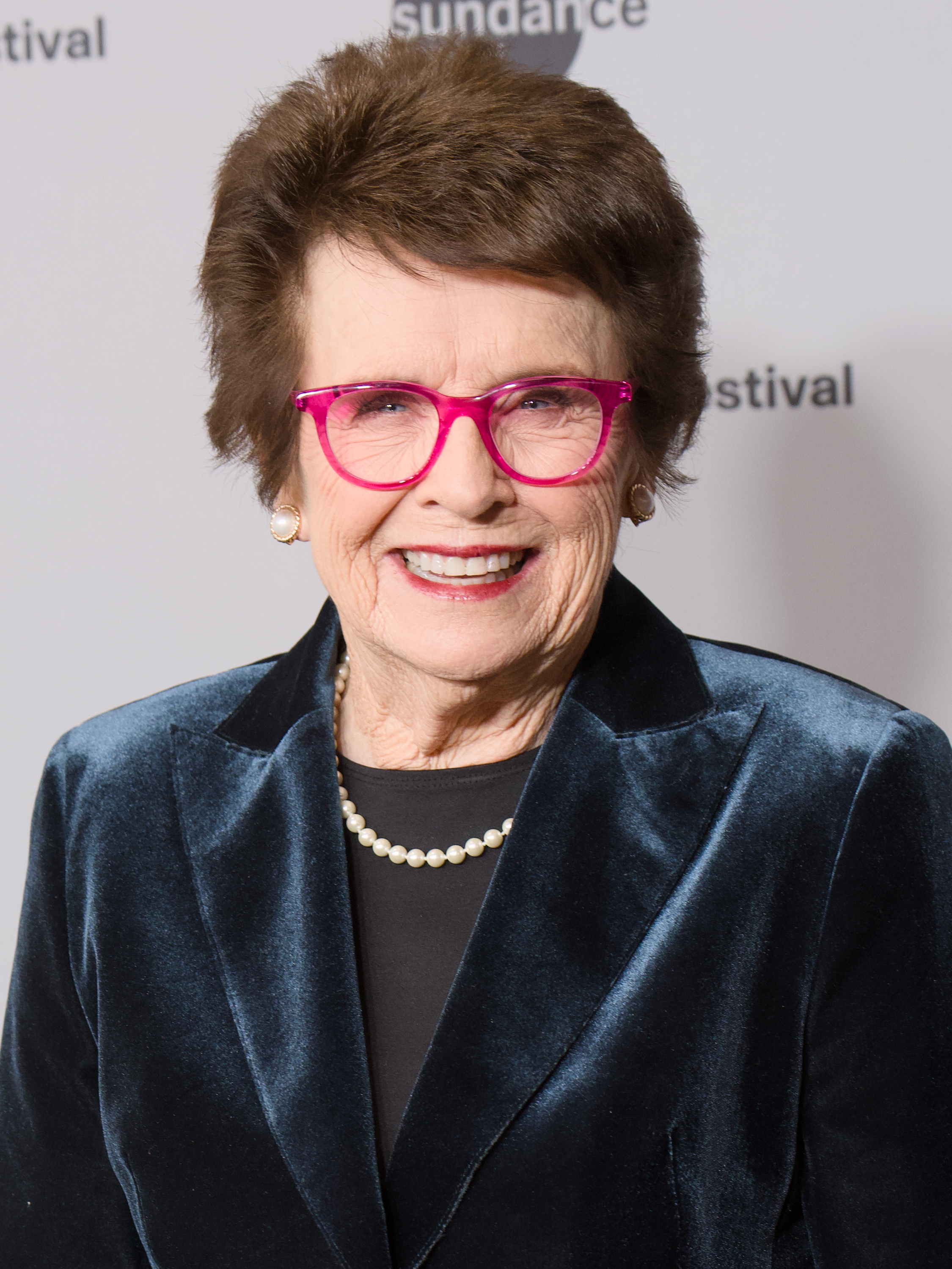
American tennis player Billie Jean King was one of The Unforgettables honorees

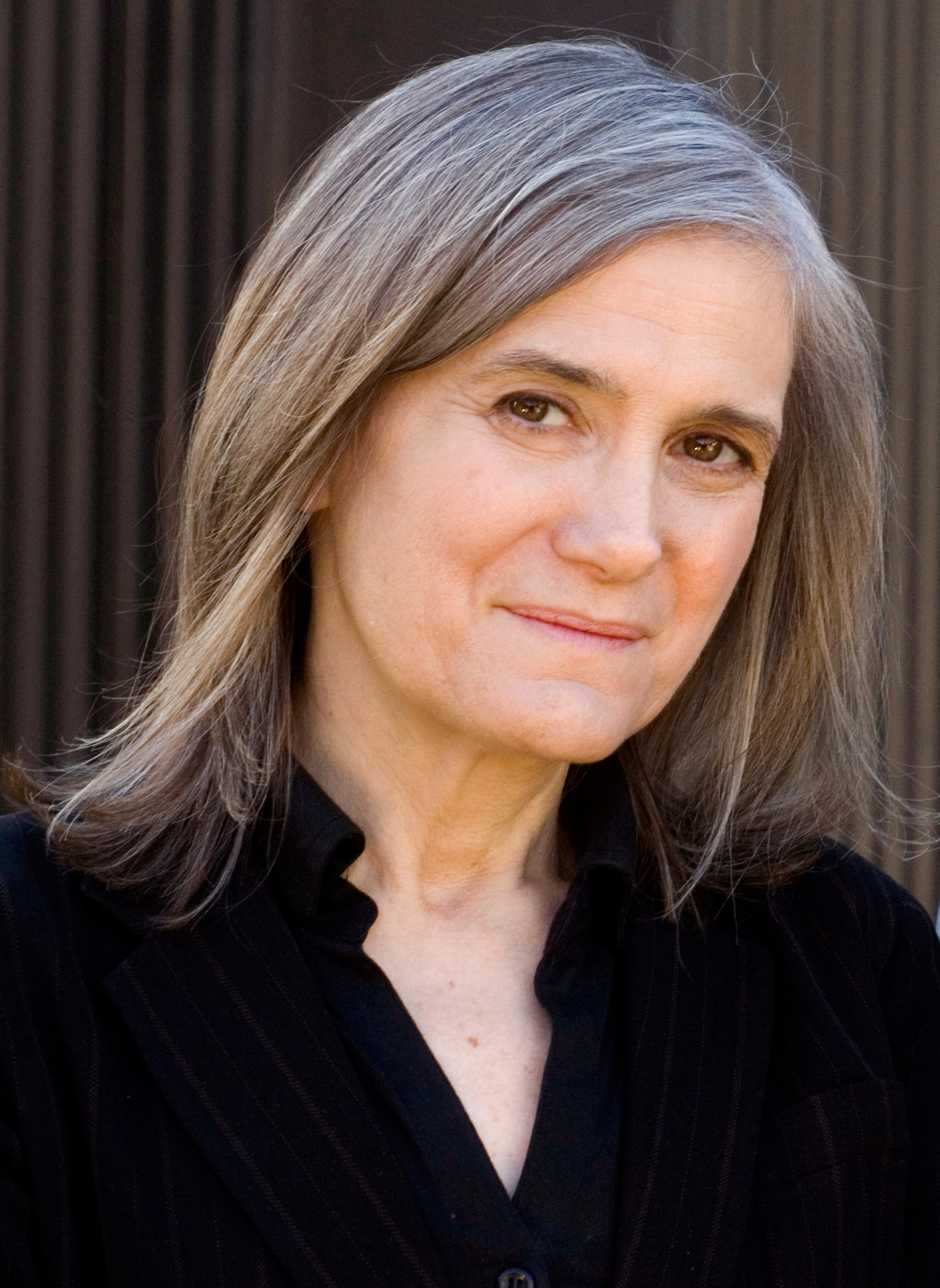
American journalist Amy Goodman was one of The Unforgettables honorees

The winners will be listed first and in bold.

=== Feature Films ===
Outstanding Achievement in Nonfiction Feature Filmmaking	Outstanding Achievement in Direction
American Doctor – Poh Si Teng, Kirstine Barfod, Reem Haddad, Chris Rentaria, Ibrahim Al Otla, Ramzy Haddad, Christopher White, Ema Ryan Yamazaki, Suad Bushnaq, Kristian Selin Eidnes Andersen, Patrick Svaneberg Vejen, Jacob Langkjær Davidsen, Dr. Thaer Ahmad, Dr. Mark Perlmutter, and Dr. Feroze Sidhwa; My Undesirable Friends: Part II – Exile – Julia Loktev, Michael Taylor, Anna Nemzer, Ksenia Mironova, Elena Kostyuchenko, and Valeria Ratnikova; NAZA – Yuval Abraham, Rachel Szor, Harry Davies, Robert Farr, and Anonymous; Once Upon a Time in Harlem – William Greaves, David Greaves, Liani Greaves, Anne de Mare, Lynn True, Tamar-kali, Clive Davidson, Roland Mitchell, Mike Frank, Matthew J. Hoffman, and Bella Racklin; Rehearsals for a Revolution – Pegah Ahangarani, Kaveh Farnam, Adria Mones, Arash Ashtiani, Neda Mohseni, and Dani Zacarias; To Hold a Mountain – Biljana Tutorov, Petar Glomazić, Quentin Laurent, Rok Bicek, Eva Kraljević, George Cragg, Draško Adžić, Julij Zornik, Samo Jurca, Mileva Gara Jovanović, and Nada Stanišić; You Can See Everything – Nathan Fielder, Lance Oppenheim, Tatiana Bears, Maggie Ambrose, Jack Davis, David Bolen, Adam Locke-Norton, Ari Balouzian, Richard Carlos, Paul Hsu, Elizabeth Holmes, Billy Evans, and Amanda Seyfried	Poh Si Teng – American Doctor; Michał Marczak – Closure; John Wilson – The History of Concrete; Yuval Abraham and Rachel Szor – NAZA; Pegah Ahangarani – Rehearsals for a Revolution; Sara Dosa – Time and Water; Nathan Fielder and Lance Oppenheim – You Can See Everything
Outstanding Achievement in Debut Feature Filmmaking	Outstanding Achievement in Production
American Doctor – Directed by Poh Si Teng; Barbara Forever – Directed By Brydie O'Connor; Bucks Harbor – Directed by Pete Muller; The History of Concrete – Directed by John Wilson; Nuisance Bear – Directed by Jack Weisman and Gabriela Osio Vanden	American Doctor – Poh Si Teng, Kirstine Barfod and Reem Haddad; Everest: The Other Side – Elizabeth Chai Vasarhelyi, Jimmy Chin, Shannon Dill, Anna Barnes, and Bob Eisenhardt; Musk – Jessie Deeter, Erin Edeiken, and Alex Gibney; My Undesirable Friends: Part II – Exile – Julia Loktev; NAZA – Nominees to be determined; You Can See Everything – Nathan Fielder, Lance Oppenheim, Tatiana Bears, Maggie Ambrose, and Jack Davis
Outstanding Achievement in Editing	Outstanding Achievement in Cinematography
The Bend in the River – Jeff Malmberg; Everybody to Kenmure Street – Colin Monie; Once Upon a Time in Harlem – Anne de Mare and Lynn True; Remake – Ross McElwee and Joe Bini; Time and Water – Erin Casper, Jocelyne Chaput and Mark Harrison; You Can See Everything – Adam Locke-Norton	Bucks Harbor – Nathan Golon, Pete Muller and Mark Unger; Closure – Michał Marczak; Everest: The Other Side – Clair Popkin, Jimmy Chin and Christopher Murphy; The Great Experiment – Stephen Maing and Eric Daniel Metzgar; To Hold a Mountain – Eva Kraljević; You Can See Everything – David Bolen
Outstanding Achievement in Original Music Score	Outstanding Achievement in Sound Design
American Doctor – Suad Bushnaq; Musk – Daniel Pemberton; Nuisance Bear – Cristobal Tapia de Veer; The Oldest Person in the World – William Ryan Fritch and T. Griffin; Time and Water – Dan Deacon; You Can See Everything – Ari Balouzian	Barbara Forever – Gisela Fulla Silvestre and Eli Cohn; Closure – Katarzyna Szczerba and Konrad Błaszczyk; NAZA – Robert Farr; Nuisance Bear – David Rose, Lou Solakofski and Reid Goobie; The Oldest Person in the World – Mark Mangini; Time and Water – Björn Viktorsson, Atli Arnarsson and Jón Atli Magnússon
Outstanding Achievement in Visual Design	Outstanding Achievement in Archival Artistry
14th – Will Hodgson; The AI Doc: Or How I Became an Apocaloptimist – Philip Eddolls, Michael Enzbrunner and Aisha Ghali; A Fox Under a Pink Moon – Mohammad Lotfali; Jean-Michel Basquiat – Anthony Konigbagbe, Yibi Hu and Daisy Evans; Musk – Nominees to be cetermined; Time and Water – Lucy Munger	Barbara Forever – Brydie O'Connor; Jean-Michel Basquiat – Wyatt Stone, Viridiana Lieberman and Rebecca Adorno Dávila; Nova '78 – Paula Vaccaro, Aaron Brookner and Tomas Baltazar; Once Upon a Time in Harlem – Anne de Mare, Lynn True, Matthew J. Hoffman, and Bella Racklin; Rehearsals for a Revolution – Arash Ashtiani; Soul Patrol – Helen Macgowan, Byron Leon, Niles Howard and Gabriela Tessitore
Spotlight Award	Heterodox Award
Jaripeo – Directed by Efraín Mojica and Rebecca Zweig; Joybubbles – Directed by Rachael J. Morrison; My NDA – Directed by Juliane Dressner and Miriam Shor; TheyDream – Directed by William D. Caballero; The Whole World is a Lie – Directed by Charlie Birns; Wood Street – Directed by Caron Creighton	Blue Heron – Directed by Sophy Romvari; A Child of My Own – Directed by Maite Alberdi; DAO – Directed by Alain Gomis; I Heard That They Are Not Going to See Each Other Anymore – Directed by Ka Ki Wong; Nirvanna the Band the Show the Movie – Directed by Matt Johnson; Whispers in May – Directed by Dongnan Chen
Audience Choice Prize	The Unforgettables
American Doctor – Directed by Poh Si Teng; Cookie Queens – Directed by Alysa Nahmias; The Cycle of Love – Directed by Orlando von Einsiedel; Everest: The Other Side – Directed by Jimmy Chin and Elizabeth Chai Vasarhelyi; NAZA – Directed by Yuval Abraham and Rachel Szor; The Oldest Person in the World – Directed by Sam Green; Steal This Story, Please! – Directed by Carl Deal and Tia Lessin; Time and Water – Directed by Sara Dosa; Wild Inside – Directed by Penny Lane; You Can See Everything – Directed by Nathan Fielder and Lance Oppenheim	**American Doctor – Dr. Thaer Ahmad, Dr. Mark Perlmutter, and Dr. Feroze Sidhwa**; **Ask E. Jean – E. Jean Carroll**; **A Fox Under a Pink Moon – Soraya Akhlaghi**; **Give Me the Ball! – Billie Jean King**; **One in a Million – Israa**; **Steal This Story, Please! – Amy Goodman**

=== Shorts ===
Outstanding Non-Fiction Shortlist

- The Boys and the Bees – Directed by Arielle Knight
- Buckskin – Directed by Mars Verrone
- A Derailment – Directed by Nathan Truesdell
- Free Joan Little – Directed by Yoruba Richen
- I Got My Brother – Directed by Victor Gabriel
- La Tierra del Valor (The Home of the Brave) – Directed by Cristina Costantini
- An Open Field – Directed by Teboho Edkins
- Sawyer Avenue, Sunday Afternoon – Directed by Bill Morrison
- They're Here – Directed by Laura Poitras and Rachel Lauren Mueller
- Water Cooler – Directed by Emma V.F.

=== Broadcast ===
Outstanding Broadcast Film	Outstanding Nonfiction Series
Bang My Box: The Robin Byrd Story – Directed by Jyllian Gunther and Stephanie Schwam (HBO Max); The Bitter Pill – Directed by Clay Tweel (POV); Critical Incident: Death at the Border – Directed by Richard Rowley (HBO Max); Earth, Wind & Fire (To Be Celestial vs That's the Weight of the World) – Directed by Ahmir "Questlove" Thompson (HBO Max); Seen & Heard: The History of Black Television – Directed by Giselle Bailey and Phil Bertelsen (HBO Max); Songs From the Hole – Directed by Contessa Gayles (Netflix)	High Horse: The Black Cowboy – Directed by Jason Perez (Peacock); Hurricane Katrina: Race Against Time – Directed by Traci A. Curry (National Geographic); Katrina: Come Hell and High Water – Directed by Geeta Gandbhir, Samantha Knowles and Spike Lee (Netflix); Mr. Scorsese – Directed by Rebecca Miller (Apple TV); Trust Me: The False Prophet – Directed by Rachel Dretzin (Netflix); The Yogurt Shop Murders – Directed by Margaret Brown (HBO Max)
Outstanding Anthology Series
Limitless: Live Better Now – Darren Aronofsky, Jane Root, Ari Handel, Tom Watt-Smith, Chris Hemsworth, and Benjamin Grayson, executive producers (Disney+); Neighbors – Ronald Bronstein, Eli Bush, John Paul Lopez-Ali, Josh Safdie, Harrison Fishman, and Dylan Redford, executive producers (HBO Max); Trainwreck – Sheun Adelasoye de Nicola, Alexander Marengo and Tim Wardle, executive producers (Netflix); Tucci in Italy – Stanley Tucci, Lottie Birmingham, Amanda Lyon, and Simon Raikes, executive producers (National Geographic); Untold – Ben Silverman, Howard Owens, Isabel San Vargas, Chapman Way, Maclain Way, and Ryan Duffy, executive producers (Netflix)
Outstanding Broadcast Editing	Outstanding Broadcast Cinematography
#Skyking – Emiliano Battista and Alexis Johnson (Hulu); Bang My Box: The Robin Byrd Story – Jeremy Stulberg (HBO Max); Breakdown: 1975 – Alan Lowe and Jody McVeigh-Schultz (Netflix); Earth, Wind & Fire (To Be Celestial vs That's the Weight of the World) – Andrew Morrow, Matt Cascella and Tim Ziegler (HBO Max); Katrina: Come Hell and High Water – Arielle Amsalem and Anna Auster (Netflix); Mr. Scorsese – David Barter (Apple TV)	Frantline: "Caught in the Crackdown" – Timothy Grucza, Jeremy Gould and Nick Kraus (PBS); High Horse: The Black Cowboy – Jerry Henry and Justin Janowitz (Peacock); The Man Will Burn – Benji Lanpher, Consuelo Althouse and Natalie Sim (HBO Max); Songs from the Hole – Michelle Kwong and Contessa Gayles (Netflix); Tucci in Italy – Matt Ball (National Geographic); The Yogurt Shop Murders – Justin Zweifach (HBO Max)

=== Legacy Award ===
- **Hoop Dreams – Directed by Steve James; Produced by James, Frederick Marx, and Peter Gilbert; Cinematography by Gilbert; Edited by James, Marx, and William Haugse; Score by Ben Sidran; Sound recording by Adam Singer**

=== Cinema Eye-Con Award for Career Achievement ===
- To be announced
