= 73rd Sydney Film Festival =

2026 film festival

- Opening film: Silenced by Selina Miles
- Closing film: Paper Tiger by James Gray
- Location: Sydney, New South Wales, Australia
- Founded: 1954
- Awards: Sydney Film Prize: Minotaur
- Festival date: 3–14 June 2026
- Website: sff.org.au

Sydney Film Festival
- 74th 72nd

The 73rd annual Sydney Film Festival took place from 3 to 14 June 2026. This edition of the Sydney Film Festival opened with the documentary film Silenced, and closed with the Australian premiere of James Gray's Cannes Competition crime thriller Paper Tiger. Exiled Russian director Andrey Zvyagintsev won the Sydney Film Prize for Minotaur.

== Jury ==
The jury members of the festival's Official Competition include:

- Kleber Mendonça Filho, Brazilian film director – Jury President
- Ildikó Enyedi, Hungarian film director and screenwriter
- Boo Junfeng, Singaporean filmmaker
- Ari Wegner, Australian cinematographer
- Sally Riley, Australian filmmaker

== Official Selection ==
=== In competition ===
| English title | Original title | Director(s) | Production country |
|---|---|---|---|
| Ben'Imana | | Marie Clémentine Dusabejambo | Rwanda, Gabon, France, Norway, Ivory Coast |
| Dao | | Alain Gomis | France, Senegal, Guinea-Bissau |
| The Dreamed Adventure | Das geträumte Abenteuer | Valeska Grisebach | Germany, France, Bulgaria, Austria |
| Fatherland | Vaterland | Paweł Pawlikowski | Poland, Germany, Italy, France |
| Fjord | | Cristian Mungiu | Romania, Norway, Denmark, Finland, France, Sweden |
| Gentle Monster | | Marie Kreutzer | Austria, Germany, France |
| The Invite | | Olivia Wilde | United States |
| Leviticus | | Adrian Chiarella | Australia |
| Minotaur | Минотавр | Andrey Zvyagintsev | France, Latvia, Germany |
| No Good Men | | Shahrbanoo Sadat | Germany, France, Norway, Denmark, Afghanistan |
| Parallel Tales | Histoires Parallèles | Asghar Farhadi | France, United States, Italy, Belgium |
| Shame and Money | | Visar Morina | Germany, Kosovo, Slovenia, Albania, North Macedonia, Belgium |
| Sheep in the Box | 箱の中の羊 | Hirokazu Kore-eda | Japan |

=== Documentary Australia ===
| English title | Original title | Director(s) | Production country |
|---|---|---|---|
| Mockbuster | | Anthony Frith | Australia |
| Phenomena | | Josef Gatti | Australia |
| The Piano Tuner | | Natalia Laska | Australia |
| Replica | | Chouwa Liang | Australia, France |
| Rodeo Dreams | | Rhian Skirving, W.A.M. Bleakley | Australia |
| Silenced (opening film) | | Selina Miles | Australia, United Kingdom |
| Sukundimi Walks Before Me | | Matasila Freshwater, Lachlan McLeod | Australia, New Zealand |
| Time and Tide | | Nicholson Ren, Vee Shi | Australia |
| Whistle | | Christopher Nelius | Australia, United States, Spain, Japan |
| Yumburra | | Grace McKenzie | Australia |

=== First Nations Award ===
| English title | Original title | Director(s) | Production country |
|---|---|---|---|
| Ancestor/great-grandparent/great-grandchild | Aanikoobijigan | Adam Khalil, Zack Khalil | United States, Denmark |
| Árru | | Elle Sofe Sara | Norway, Sweden, Finland |
| At the Place of Ghosts | Sk+te’kmujue’katik | Bretten Hannam | Canada |
| Ceremony | | Banchi Hanuse | Canada |
| Nika and Madison | | Eva Thomas | Canada |
| Powwow People | | Sky Hopinka | United States |
| Wrong Husband | Uiksaringitara | Zacharias Kunuk | Canada |

=== Special Presentations ===
| English title | Original title | Director(s) | Production country |
|---|---|---|---|
| Árru | | Elle Sofe Sara | Norway, Sweden, Finland |
| The Birthday Party | Histoires de la Nuit | Léa Mysius | France |
| Colony | 군체 | Yeon Sang-ho | South Korea |
| Dead Man's Wire | | Gus Van Sant | United States |
| Knife: The Attempted Murder of Salman Rushdie | | Alex Gibney | United States |
| The Man I Love | | Ira Sachs | United States, France |
| Pressure | | Anthony Maras | United Kingdom, France |
| Rays and Shadows | Les Rayons et Les Ombres | Xavier Giannoli | France |
| Rose | | Markus Schleinzer | Austria, Germany |
| The Samurai and the Prisoner | 黒牢城 | Kiyoshi Kurosawa | Japan |
| Silent Friend | Stiller Freund | Ildikó Enyedi | Germany, France, Hungary, China |
| Sundays | Los domingos | Alauda Ruiz de Azúa | Spain |
| Teenage Sex and Death at Camp Miasma | | Jane Schoenbrun | United States |
| The Valley | | Ian Darling | Australia |
| Yellow Letters | Gelbe Briefe | İlker Çatak | Germany, Turkey, France |

=== Special Screenings ===
| English title | Original title | Director(s) | Production country |
|---|---|---|---|
| All of a Sudden | 急に具合が悪くなる | Ryusuke Hamaguchi | France, Japan, Germany, Belgium |
| La bola negra | | Javier Calvo, Javier Ambrossi | Spain, France |
| Congo Boy | | Rafiki Fariala | Central African Republic, France, Democratic Republic of Congo, Italy |
| Coward | | Lukas Dhont | Belgium, France, Netherlands |
| Jim Queen | Jim Queen à la recherche de la Chloroqueer | Marco Nguyen, Nicolas Athané | France |
| The Match | El Partido | Juan Cabral, Santiago Franco | Argentina |
| Paper Tiger (closing film) | | James Gray | United States |
| Red Rocks | Les Roches Rouges | Bruno Dumont | France, Portugal, Italy, Spain, Qatar |
| Tangles | | Leah Nelson | Canada, United States |

=== Features ===
| English title | Original title | Director(s) | Production country |
|---|---|---|---|
| 100 Sunset | | Kunsang Kyirong | Canada |
| 9 Temples to Heaven | 9 วัด สู่สวรรค์ | Sompot Chidgasornpongse | Thailand, Singapore, France, Norway |
| The American Dream | Le Rêve Américain | Anthony Marciano | France |
| Animol | | Ashley Walters | United Kingdom |
| The Arab | | Malek Bensmaïl | Algeria, France |
| Behind the Palm Trees | Derrière les palmiers | Meryem Benm'Barek-Aloïsi | Morocco, France |
| Black Rabbit, White Rabbit | Харгӯши сиёҳ, харгӯши сафед | Shahram Mokri | Tajikistan, United Arab Emirates |
| The Blood Countess | Die Blutgräfin | Ulrike Ottinger | Austria, Luxembourg, Germany |
| Body Blow | | Dean Francis | Australia |
| Boss Cat | | Genevieve Clay-Smith | Australia |
| The Death of Robin Hood | | Michael Sarnoski | United States |
| Don't Tell Mother | Ammang Haelbeda | Anoop Lokkur | India, Autralia |
| El Sett | | Marwan Hamed | Egypt, Saudi Arabia |
| Erupcja | | Pete Ohs | United States, Poland |
| Everytime | | Sandra Wollner | Austria, Germany |
| Filipiñana | | Rafael Manuel | United Kingdom, Philippines, Singapore, France, Netherlands |
| First Light | | James J. Robinson | Philippines, Australia |
| Flies | Moscas | Fernando Eimbcke | Mexico |
| The Fox | | Dario Russo | Australia |
| French Girls | | Hyun Lee | Australia |
| Gail Daughtry and the Celebrity Sex Pass | | David Wain | United States |
| Good Boy | | Jan Komasa | Poland, United Kingdom |
| Heart of Light – Eleven Songs for Fiji | | Cynthia Beatt | Germany, France |
| Hen | Kota | György Pálfi | Hungary, Germany, Greece |
| I See Buildings Fall Like Lightning | | Clio Barnard | United Kingdom, France, United States |
| I Want Your Sex | | Gregg Araki | United States |
| Isabel | | Gabe Klinger | Brazil, France |
| Julian | | Cato Kusters | Belgium, Netherlands |
| Late Fame | | Kent Jones | United States |
| The Loneliest Man in Town | | Tizza Covi, Rainer Frimmel | Austria |
| Lost Land | Harà Watan | Akio Fujimoto | Japan, France, Malaysia, Germany |
| Mama | | Adi Bar Yossef | Israel, Poland |
| Master | মাস্টার | Rezwan Shahriar Sumit | Bangladesh |
| Memory of Princess Mumbi | | Damien Hauser | Kenya, Switzerland, Saudi Arabia |
| Mile End Kicks | | Chandler Levack | Canada |
| Morte Cucina | ครัวสาว | Pen-ek Ratanaruang | Thailand |
| Mouse | | Kelly O'Sullivan, Alex Thompson | United States |
| The Mutation | 사랑의 탄생 | Shin Su-won | South Korea |
| On the Road | En el camino | David Pablos | Mexico |
| Palestine 36 | | Annemarie Jacir | Palestine, United Kingdom, France, Denmark, Qatar, Saudi Arabia, Jordan |
| People and Meat | 사람과 고기 | Yang Jong-hyun | South Korea |
| Queen at Sea | | Lance Hammer | United Kingdom, United States |
| Ripples in the Mist | 霧海微瀾 | Clara Law | Australia |
| Rose of Nevada | | Mark Jenkin | United Kingdom |
| Rosebush Pruning | | Karim Aïnouz | United Kingdom, Italy, Germany, Spain |
| Saccharine | | Natalie Erika James | Australia |
| A Sad and Beautiful World | نجوم الأمل و الألم | Cyril Aris | Lebanon, United States, Germany, Saudi Arabia, Qatar |
| Soumsoum, the Night of the Stars | Soumsoum, la nuit des astres | Mahamat-Saleh Haroun | France, Chad |
| Strange River | Estrany riu | Jaume Claret Muxart | Spain, Germany |
| Strawberries | La más dulce | Laïla Marrakchi | France, Morocco, Spain, Belgium |
| We Are All Strangers | 我们不是陌生人 | Anthony Chen | Singapore |
| The Wizard of the Kremlin | Le Mage du Kremlin | Olivier Assayas | France |
| The World of Love | 세계의 주인 | Yoon Ga-eun | South Korea |
| Yesterday Island | | Sam Voutas | Australia |

=== International Documentaries ===
| English title | Original title | Director(s) | Production country |
|---|---|---|---|
| 32 Meters | | Morteza Atabaki | Türkiye, Iran, Qatar |
| The AI Doc: Or How I Became an Apocaloptimist | | Daniel Roher, Charlie Tyrell | United States |
| American Doctor | | Poh Si Teng | United States, Palestine, Malaysia, Qatar |
| Baby Jackfruit Baby Guava | | Nông Nhật Quang | Vietnam, South Korea |
| Birds of War | | Janay Boulos, Abd Alkader Habak | United Kingdom, Syria, Lebanon |
| A Child of my Own | Un Hijo Propio | Maite Alberdi | Mexico |
| Closure | | Michał Marczak | Poland |
| Crocodile | | Pietra Brettkelly, The Critics | New Zealand, Nigeria |
| The Cycle of Love | | Orlando von Einsiedel | United Kingdom, United States, Sweden, India |
| Daughters of the Forest | Hijas Del Bosque | Otilia Portillo Padua | Mexico |
| Everybody to Kenmure Street | | Felipe Bustos Sierra | Scotland |
| A Fox Under a Pink Moon | Roobah Va Mah Soorati | Mehrdad Oskouei, Soraya | Iran, France, United Kingdom, United States, Denmark |
| Give Me the Ball! | | Liz Garbus, Elizabeth Wolff | United States |
| Hanging by a Wire | | Mohammed Ali Naqvi | United States, United Kingdom, Pakistan |
| The History of Concrete | | John Wilson | United States |
| If Pigeons Turned to Gold | Kdyby se holubi proměnili ve zlato | Pepa Lubojacki | Czech Republic, Slovakia |
| Just Look Up | | Emma Wall, Betsy Hershey | United States, Denmark |
| Lomu | | Gavin Fitzgerald, Vea Mafile'o | New Zealand, United Kingdom |
| My Father and Qaddafi | | Jihan | United States, Libya |
| Nuisance Bear | | Gabriela Osio Vanden, Jack Weisman | United States, Canada |
| Once Upon a Time in Harlem | | William Greaves, David Greaves | United States |
| Our Land | Nuestra Tierra | Lucrecia Martel | Argentina, United States, Mexico, France, Netherlands, Denmark |
| Past Future Continuous | | Morteza Ahmadvand, Firouzeh Khosrovani | Iran, Norway, Italy |
| Remake | | Ross McElwee | United States |
| The Seoul Guardians | 서울의 밤 | Kim Jong-woo, Kim Shin-wan, Cho Chul-young | South Korea |
| Steal This Story, Please! | | Carl Deal, Tia Lessin | United States |
| Summer 2000: the X-cetra Story | | Ayden Mayeri | United States |
| The Tale of Silyan | Приказната за Силјан | Tamara Kotevska | North Macedonia |
| TheyDream | | William D. Caballero | United States |
| Time and Water | | Sara Dosa | Iceland, United States |
| To Hold a Mountain | | Biljana Tutorov, Petar Glomazić | Serbia, France, Montenegro, Slovenia, Croatia |
| Traces | Сліди | Alisa Kovalenko, Marysia Nikitiuk | Ukraine, Poland |
| Whispers in the Woods | Le Chant des Forêts | Vincent Munier | France |

=== Sounds on Screen ===
| English title | Original title | Director(s) | Production country |
|---|---|---|---|
| Amadou & Mariam: The Blind Couple from Mali | | Ryan Marley | Canada |
| The Best Summer | | Tamra Davis | United States |
| Broken English | | Iain Forsyth and Jane Pollard | United Kingdom |
| Jack Johnson: SURFILMUSIC | | Emmett Malloy | United States |
| Newport & the Great Folk Dream | | Robert Gordon | United States |
| Tenor: My Name Is Pati | | Rebecca Tansley | New Zealand |

=== Flux: Art+Film ===
| English title | Original title | Director(s) | Production country |
|---|---|---|---|
| Chronovisor | | Jack Auen, Kevin Walker | United States |
| Dry Leaf | ხმელი ფოთოლი | Alexandre Koberidze | Germany, Georgia |
| Joy Boy: A Tribute to Julius Eastman | | Mawena Yehouessi, Fallon Mayanja, Rob Jacobs, Victoire Karera Kampire, Paul Shemisi, Anne Reijniers | Belgium, France, Democratic Republic of Congo |
| Maddie's Secret | | John Early | United States |
| Tycoon | | Charlotte Zhang | Canada, United States |

=== Freak Me Out ===
| English title | Original title | Director(s) | Production country |
|---|---|---|---|
| Dawning | Demring | Patrik Syversen | Norway |
| Ghost in the Cell | | Joko Anwar | Indonesia, South Korea |
| Imposters | | Caleb Phillips | United States |
| Mum, I'm Alien Pregnant | | THUNDERLIPS | New Zealand |
| Never After Dark | | Dave Boyle | Japan |
| The Peril at Pincer Point | | Noah Stratton-Twine, Jake Kuhn | United Kingdom |

=== EUROPE! Voices of Women+ in Film ===
| English title | Original title | Director(s) | Production country |
|---|---|---|---|
| The Currents | Las corrientes | Milagros Mumenthaler | Switzerland, Argentina |
| Heysel 85 | | Teodora Ana Mihai | Belgium, Netherlands, Germany |
| Hold onto Me | Κράτα Με | Myrsini Aristidou | Cyprus, Denmark, Greece |
| The Kidnapping of Arabella | Il rapimento di Arabella | Carolina Cavalli | Italy |
| La Belle Année | | Angelica Ruffier | Sweden, Norway |
| Sorella di Clausura | | Ivana Mladenović | Romania, Serbia, Italy, Spain |

=== Screenability ===
| English title | Original title | Director(s) | Production country |
|---|---|---|---|
| Joybubbles | | Rachael J. Morrison | United States |
| Retreat | | Ted Evans | United Kingdom |
| You Look Fine | | J. Snow | United States |

=== Family ===
| English title | Original title | Director(s) | Production country |
|---|---|---|---|
| The Desert Child | L'Enfant du désert | Gilles de Maistre | France |
| The Last Whale Singer | | Reza Memari | Germany, Czech Republic, Canada |

=== Classics Restored ===
| English title | Original title | Director(s) | Production country |
|---|---|---|---|
| The Arch (1968) | 董夫人 | Tang Shu Shuen | Hong Kong |
| Eureka (2000) | | Shinji Aoyama | Japan |
| He Died with a Felafel in His Hand (2001) | | Richard Lowenstein | Australia |
| Queen Kelly (1932) | | Erich von Stroheim | United States |
| Vive l'amour (1994) | 爱情万岁 | Tsai Ming-liang | Taiwan |
| Yam Daabo (1986) | Le Choix | Idrissa Ouédraogo | Burkina Faso, France |

=== Sartorial: Fashion on Film ===
| English title | Original title | Director(s) | Production country |
|---|---|---|---|
| French Girls | | Hyun Lee | Australia |
| Jane B. par Agnès V. | | Agnès Varda | France |
| Marc by Sofia | | Sofia Coppola | United States |
| Notebook on Cities and Clothes | Aufzeichnungen zu Kleidern und Städten | Wim Wenders | France, West Germany |
| Prêt-à-Porter | | Robert Altman | United States |
| Useless | 无用 | Jia Zhangke | China |

=== The Tropical Trail ===
| English title | Original title | Director(s) | Production country |
|---|---|---|---|
| Black God, White Devil | Deus e o Diabo na Terra do Sol | Glauber Rocha | Brazil |
| Central Station | Central do Brasil | Walter Salles | Brazil, France |
| Cinema, Aspirins and Vultures | Cinema, Aspirinas e Urubus | Marcelo Gomes | Brazil |
| The Hour and Turn of Augusto Matraga | A Hora e Vez de Augusto Matraga | Roberto Santos | Brazil |
| Lúcio Flávio: The Passenger of Agony | Lúcio Flávio: O Passageiro Da Agonia | Héctor Babenco | Brazil |
| Man Marked for Death, Twenty Years Later | Cabra Marcado Para Morrer | Eduardo Coutinho | Brazil |
| Neon Bull | Boi neon | Gabriel Mascaro | Brazil |
| São Paulo, Incorporated | São Paulo, Sociedade Anônima | Luis Sérgio Person | Brazil |
| The Second Mother | Que Horas Ela Volta? | Anna Muylaert | Brazil |

=== Barbara Hammer: Radical Visibility ===
| English title | Original title | Director(s) | Production country |
|---|---|---|---|
| Barbara Forever | | Brydie O'Connor | United States |
| Barbara Hammer: A Visual Poet | | Barbara Hammer | United States |
| Barbara Hammer: Was a Superdyke | | Barbara Hammer | United States |
| History Lessons | | Barbara Hammer | United States |
| Nitrate Kisses | | Barbara Hammer | United States |

== Awards ==
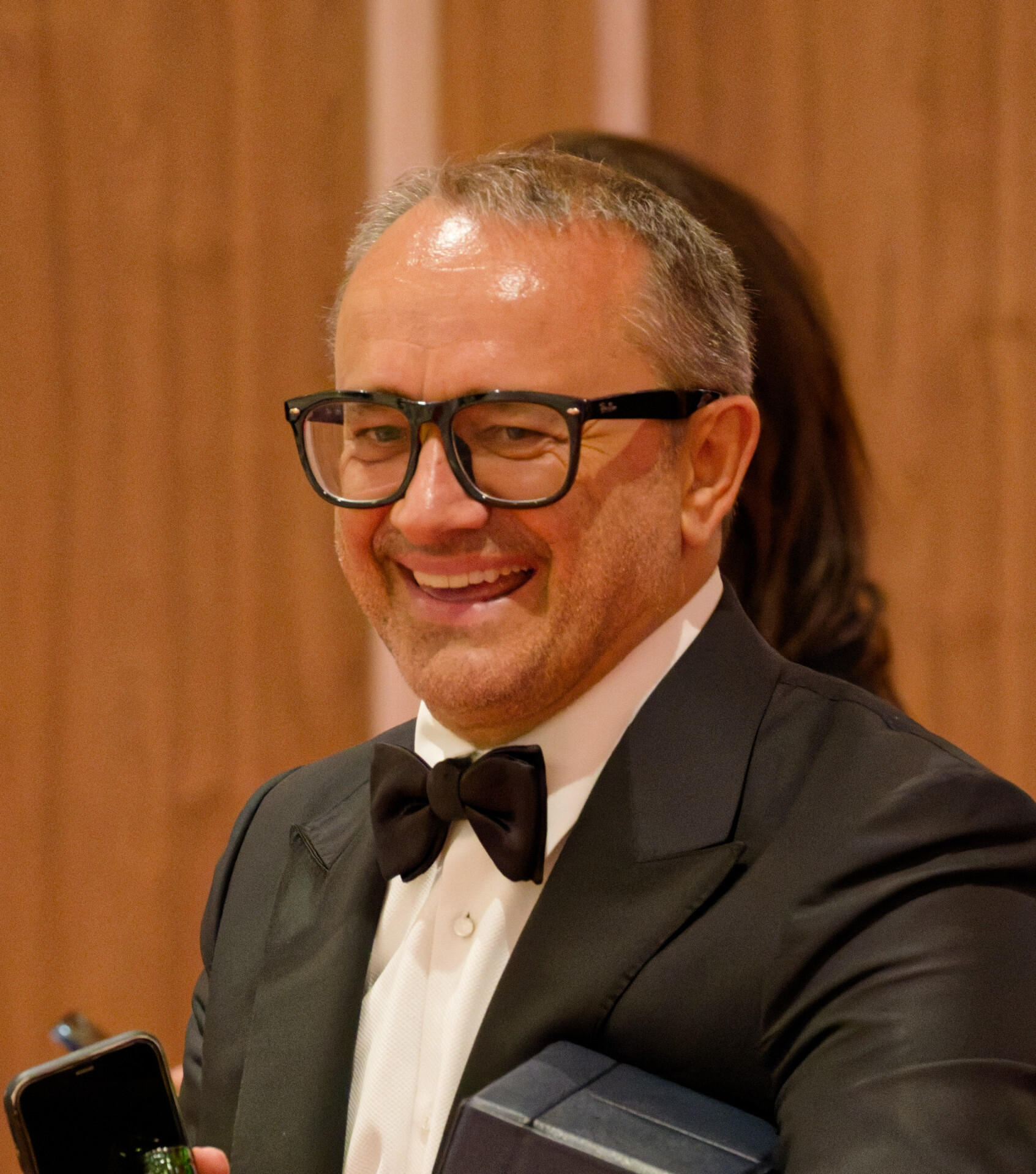
Andrey Zvyagintsev, Sydney Film Prize winner

- Sydney Film Prize: Minotaur by Andrey Zvyagintsev
- Sustainable Future Award: Sukundimi Walks Before Me by Matasila Freshwater and Lachlan McLeod
- First Nations Award: Ceremony by Banchi Hanuse
- Documentary Australia Award: Time and Tide by Vee Shi
- Sydney-UNESCO City of Film Award presented by Screen NSW: Fadia Abboud
- Dendy Awards for Australian Short Films:
  - Dendy Live Action Short Award: Maŋutji by Siena Mayutu Wurmarri Stubbs
  - Yoram Gross Animation Award: Our Choir Has Always Been Travelling by Judith Pungarta Inkamala, Marjorie ‘Nunga’ Williams and Nelson Armstrong
  - Rouben Mamoulian Award for Best Australian Director: Cristabel Sved for Date 3
  - AFTRS Craft Award for Best Practitioner: Angelina Kovacs and Sophie Ravant, production designers for Flesh Fruit
  - Event Cinemas Rising Talent Award for Screenwriting: Judith Pungarta Inkamala, Marjorie ‘Nunga’ Williams and Nelson Armstrong for Our Choir Has Always Been Travelling
- GIO Audience Awards:
  - Best Australian Feature: The Fox
  - Best Australian Feature, Runner up: First Light
  - Best Australian Documentary: Rodeo Dreams
  - Best Australian Documentary, Runner up: The Piano Tuner
  - Best International Feature: La bola negra
  - Best International Feature, Runner up: All of a Sudden
  - Best International Documentary: American Doctor
  - Best International Documentary, Runner up: The Cycle of Love
