= Ali Azimi =

Iranian musician

Ali Azimi علی عظیمی
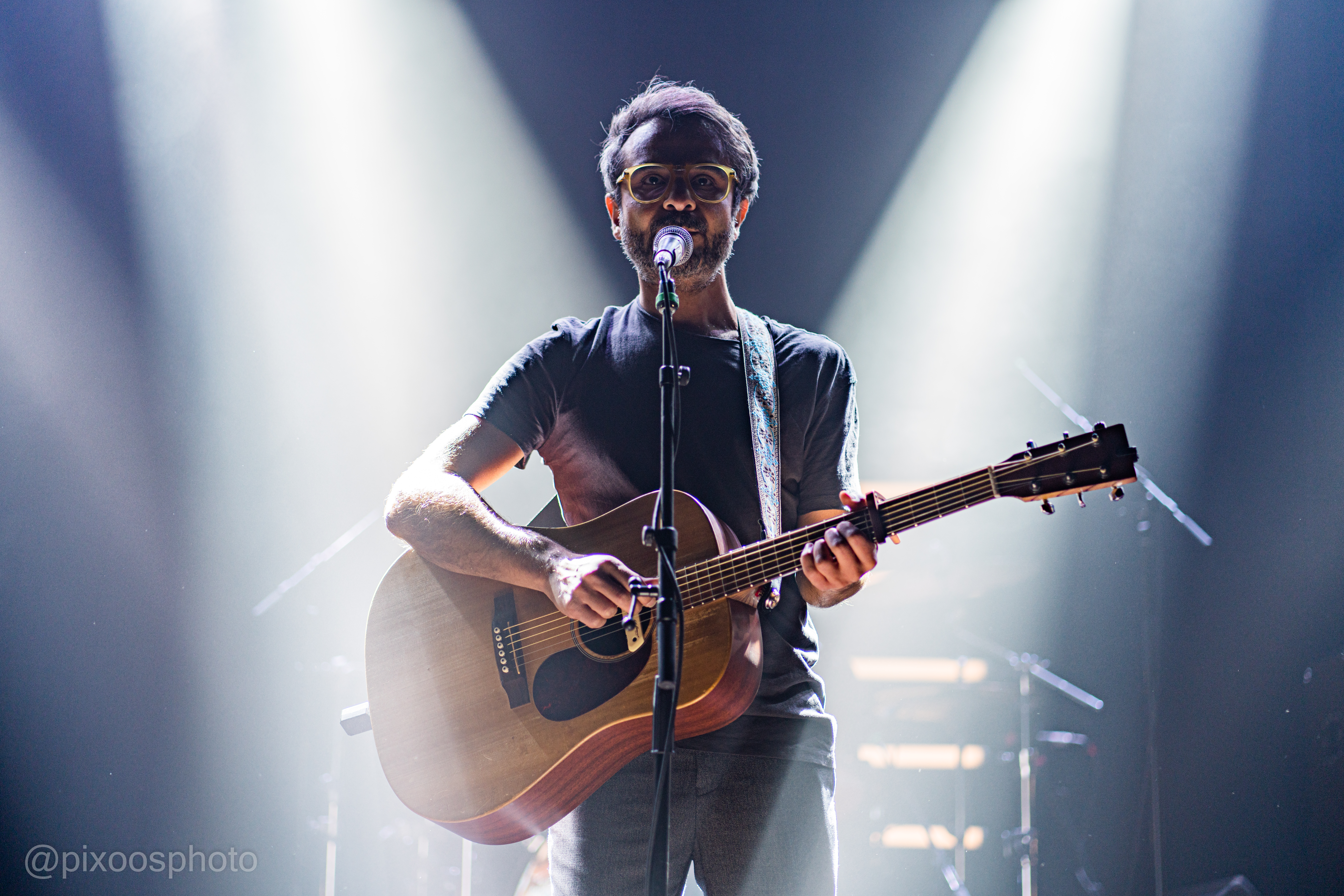
- Ali Azimi performing live in Toronto. Photo by Pouria Afkhami

Background information
- Born: 29 August 1977 (age 48); Tehran, Iran
- Genres: Rock, Blues, Country, Pop, Reggae, Fusion, Alternative
- Occupations: Singer, songwriter, guitarist
- Instruments: Vocals, guitar, electric guitar, piano, keyboard
- Label: Sakkou
- Formerly of: Dang Show
- Spouse: Pegah Ahangarani
- Website: https://aliazimimusic.com

Ali Azimi (Persian: علی عظیمی) is a London-based, Iranian singer-songwriter and guitarist. He is considered a pioneer for the Iranian alternative music scene, starring as the vocalist and songwriter for the band Radio Tehran until the early 2010s, alongside Pedram Afshin (lead guitar), Hesam Garshasbi (bass) and Payam Hashemi (drums).

After Radio Tehran disbanded, Ali embarked on a solo career, and released his debut album Mr. Mean in 2013. Ali released his third album in 2019.

== Biography ==
Born and raised in Tehran, Iran, Ali Azimi began his interest in music at a young age. Coming from a musical family, he taught himself how to play the Piano and studied classical guitar with Bagher Moazen. Azimi completed a Bachelor's Degree in Mechanical Engineering in Iran, at the University of Tehran followed by a Masters Degree in the same field in London, at Brunel.

In his early 30s, after years of work and study in the field of Mechanical Engineering, Ali Azimi set aside his work as an engineer in the UK and began to follow his passion for music. The song "33" from the album, Mr. Mean and the song Tatilat, from Radio Tehran album are both based on this experience.

In 2010 Ali founded Sakkou Productions. Sakkou has documented the alternative and underground Iranian music and musicians, including in a documentary series published on ManotoTV and Youtube. Many of Ali's own shows and music have since been produced under the label. It also has promoted, showcased and produced music and events by fellow musicians – who are unable to freely express their love for music in the Islamic Republic of Iran.

After quitting his engineering career Ali Azimi went to Iran and in the year 1388 (2009) and formed the Iranian rock band Radio Tehran. Leading this new band, Ali recorded the album 88. Touching on the issues of the young Iranians, the album gave a fresh sound and perspective within the Iranian alternative music scene.

Departing from his previous band, Ali Azimi's first solo album, Mr. Mean, was released in October 2013. This album includes major hit songs such as "Prelude", and "Aghaye Past".

The music video for the song "Mr. Mean" was the first prize winner at Farhang Foundation's short film festival.

After a successful tour of Europe, America, and Canada in 2014 for his album, Mr. Mean, Ali Azimi released his second solo album "Ezzat Ziad" in June 2016 with hit songs such as "Farda Soraghe Man Bia" Featuring "Mohsen Namjoo" and "Zendegi" based on a poem by "Houshang Ebtehaj". Ali Azimi and his band went on a grand tour in autumn 2016 and covered 15 cities across Europe and North America.

Ali Azimi continues to write and publish music, often in response to current events – for example, the song "Khooneyeh Bahar" (Spring's Home), published in 2021 and written in response to 2019–2020 Iranian protests. His uncredited performance of his composition Pishdaramad was used in The Salesman, an Oscar winning movie produced in 2016 by Asghar Farhadi.

== Of Love and Other Evils ==
Ali released his anticipated third album on 1 October 2019 titled Of Love and Other Evils. His songs like Heyhot and Panahandeh are gaining much popularity among the Persians despite the fact that this is a newly released album. Ali has announced that he will be going on a worldwide tour following his album release; beginning with Europe in the Fall of 2019.

The tour was a success, and, after a pause over 2020/2021 due to covid, Ali has regularly been touring Europe and North America ever since.

== Discography ==
=== with radio Tehran band ===
- 88

=== Solo albums ===
- 2013 Mr. Mean
- 2016 Ezzat ziad (Till Glory Finds Us)
- 2019 Az eshgh va shayatin-e digar (Of Love & Other Evils)
- 2022 Kahrobaye Arezou

== Critical response ==
Ali Azimi has been interviewed by BBC World, MBC Persia, ManotoTV, ABC Australia and Roozonline.
