= Maggie's Plan =

2015 film by Rebecca Miller

- Theatrical release poster
- Directed by: Rebecca Miller
- Screenplay by: Rebecca Miller
- Story by: Karen Rinaldi
- Produced by: Rachael Horovitz; Damon Cardasis; Rebecca Miller
- Starring: Greta Gerwig; Ethan Hawke; Bill Hader; Maya Rudolph; Travis Fimmel; Wallace Shawn; Ida Rohatyn; Julianne Moore
- Cinematography: Sam Levy
- Edited by: Sabine Hoffmann
- Music by: Michael Rohatyn
- Production companies: Round Films; Rachael Horovitz Productions; Freedom Media; Locomotive; Hyperion Media; Franklin Street Capital; Protagonist Pictures
- Distributed by: Sony Pictures Classics
- Release dates: September 12, 2015 (TIFF); May 20, 2016 (United States)
- Running time: 98 minutes
- Country: United States
- Languages: English; Danish
- Box office: $7.1 million

Maggie's Plan is a 2015 American romantic comedy-drama film written and directed by Rebecca Miller, based on an original story by Karen Rinaldi (later published as the 2017 novel The End of Men). The film stars Greta Gerwig, Ethan Hawke, Bill Hader, Maya Rudolph, Travis Fimmel, Wallace Shawn, Ida Rohatyn, and Julianne Moore.

The film had its world premiere at the Toronto International Film Festival on September 12, 2015. It was given a limited theatrical release in the United States on May 20, 2016, by Sony Pictures Classics.

== Plot ==
Maggie Hardin, the director of business development and outreach for the art and design students at The New School in New York City, decides she wants to have a child, and enlists a former college acquaintance, Guy Childers, a math major and pickle entrepreneur, to donate his sperm.

At the university, she meets John Harding, a "ficto-critical anthropologist", who is married to a tenured professor at Columbia University. Repeatedly bumping into each other on campus, John confides in Maggie that he is writing a novel. Maggie begins reading it, and they start meeting on a regular basis to discuss it.

Maggie attempts to inseminate herself with Guy's sperm, but the process is interrupted by an unexpected visit from John. He confesses that he is in love with her and wants to be the father of her child.

Three years later, Maggie and John are married, and they have a daughter, Lily. She constantly finds herself having to put her professional goals on the back burner to take care of her and her two stepchildren, and to support John's writing. Taking Lily for a walk, Maggie runs into Guy, who initially thinks Lily is his daughter, but she tells him she is John's child.

At a book signing, Maggie approaches Georgette, John's ex-wife, and tells her that she knows Georgette is still in love with John, and realizes she wants to help them get back together. Although initially resistant, Georgette decides to go along with the plan.

Georgette gets Maggie's help to get John to attend a conference in Canada, which she will also be attending. At the conference, the former couple make up and sleep together. Returning home, John confesses everything to Maggie, who tells him he belongs with Georgette.

John accidentally learns that Maggie had planned to reunite him with Georgette through a drunk friend of Maggie's. He leaves Maggie and Lily, and disappears for a while. Maggie goes to speak to Georgette, in order to try to find out any news about John, and ends up taking Georgette and the children to her home.

There, Georgette spends the day reading John's novel. Meeting with him later, she tells him her opinion about the novel, as she returns it to him as a bag of ash. Realizing that she knows him better than he knows himself, John forgives Georgette for her part in the scheme, and they reconcile.

Sometime later, the blended family goes out ice-skating. Maggie is surprised when Lily begins to recite numbers, as neither she nor John are mathematically inclined. She sees Guy walking towards the ice rink, with the look of revelation on her face.

== Cast ==
- Greta Gerwig as Maggie Hardin
- Ethan Hawke as John Harding
- Bill Hader as Tony
- Maya Rudolph as Felicia
- Travis Fimmel as Guy Childers
- Ida Rohatyn as Lily Harding
- Wallace Shawn as Kliegler
- Julianne Moore as Georgette Nørgaard
- Mina Sundwall as Justine Harding
- Jackson Frazer as Paul Harding
- Monte Greene as Max

== Production ==
On January 9, 2014, it was announced that Rebecca Miller and Greta Gerwig would respectively direct and star in the romantic comedy Maggie's Plan, scripted by Miller and based on a story by Karen Rinaldi. Rachael Horovitz signed on to produce through Specialty Films along with Miller and Damon Cardasis through their Round Films. Julianne Moore was added to the cast of the film on January 15, 2014. Clive Owen had joined on May 1, 2014, although he did not appear in the finished film, while on February 2, 2015, Travis Fimmel joined the film's cast. On February 3, 2015, Variety reported that Ethan Hawke, Bill Hader, and Maya Rudolph had joined the film.

Filming began on February 23, 2015, in New York City.

== Release ==
The film had its world premiere in the Special Presentations section of the Toronto International Film Festival on September 12, 2015. Shortly thereafter, Sony Pictures Classics acquired distribution rights to the film. The film had its U.S. premiere at the New York Film Festival on October 4, 2015. It also went on to screen at the Sundance Film Festival on January 22, 2016, and the 66th Berlin International Film Festival on February 15, 2016. Following a special screening at the Landmark Sunshine Cinema in New York City on May 5, 2016, the film was released in select theaters in the United States on May 20, 2016.

== Critical response ==
Maggie's Plan received positive reviews from film critics. On the review aggregator website Rotten Tomatoes, the film holds an approval rating of 86% based on 183 reviews, with an average rating of 7.1/10. The website's critics consensus reads, "With a typically absorbing performance from Greta Gerwig leading the way, Maggie's Plan gives rom-com sensibilities a smart, subversive twist." Metacritic, which uses a weighted average, assigned the film a score of 76 out of 100, based on 35 critics, indicating "generally favorable reviews".

Variety's Dennis Harvey described it as "nicely crafted on all levels", with "Greta Gerwig, Ethan Hawke, and Julianne Moore making a pleasing triangle in Rebecca Miller's offbeat romantic comedy". Richard Lawson from Vanity Fair praised the film as "a smart, goofy delight", highlighting Julianne Moore's "comedy chops" and praising the rest of the cast as being in "near-perfect harmony, creating a lively, inviting hum". Other critics also pointed out Moore's performance as "scene-stealing", including Nigel M. Smith from The Guardian: "Maggie's Plan serves as a strong reminder for what a comedic force Moore can be when served by the right material." He also singled out Gerwig for "effortlessly leading most of the picture".
