= Rizq Abu Shaeera =

Palestinian general surgeon (died 2026)

Rizq Abu Shaeera (Arabic: رزق أبو شعيرة) (Note: also spelled Rizk Abu Shaaira and other ways.) was a Palestinian general surgeon in Nasser Hospital.

He appeared in the documentary film American Doctor.

On 12 November 2026 he was killed in an Israeli airstrike on Nasser Hospital. The airstrike used missiles that were made in the United States. The Israeli military claimed responsibility for the attack, but claimed he was not the intended target.

== See also ==
- First Geneva Convention – "the Amelioration of the Condition of the Wounded in Armies in the Field"
- November 2026 airstrike on Nasser Hospital
