= Time and Tide (2026 film) =

2026 feature film by Vee Shi

- Directed by: Vee Shi
- Written by: Vee Shi
- Produced by: Nicholson Ren; Vee Shi
- Cinematography: Nicholson Ren
- Edited by: Vee Shi
- Music by: Luna Pan
- Production companies: Niu Studios; Big and Little Films
- Release date: 2026
- Country: Australia
- Languages: Fuqing dialect Mandarin

Time and Tide (Chinese: 光阴) is a 2026 Australian film blending documentary and narrative filmmaking, marking the feature debut of director Vee Shi. Centred on his family's home in China, it follows the aftermath of his father's stroke and its effect on the household. The film had its world premiere at the 2026 Visions du Réel festival, competing in the Burning Lights section, and later received the Documentary Australia Award at the Sydney Film Festival.

== Production ==
Niu Studios produced the film in partnership with Big and Little Films, with Nicholson Ren and Shi credited as producers alongside executive producer Michael McMahon. Shi also served as the film's writer, director and editor; Ren handled cinematography, and composer Luna Pan supplied the score.

Shi travelled to Fujian with Ren in 2023 without a finished script and shot for roughly a month. He described the film's origins as a scripted, family-based drama that at one stage incorporated science-fiction elements before evolving into its current form.

According to comments Shi made to Business Doc Europe, the shift toward documentary technique came after his parents struggled to perform scripted scenes; the crew instead captured more unscripted, everyday moments alongside some remaining scripted material.

== Release ==
Following its Burning Lights premiere at Visions du Réel, the film travelled to Australia for a screening at the 73rd Sydney Film Festival. Inwave Films, a Paris-based sales agency, took on international sales rights for the title in July 2026.

Busan International Film Festival selected it for the festival's Wide Angle – Documentary Showcase strand, with a first screening set for 7 October 2026.

== Film festivals ==
Year	Festival	Programme / recognition
2026	Visions du Réel	Burning Lights Competition; world premiere.
2026	Sydney Film Festival	Documentary Australia Award winner.
2026	Melbourne International Film Festival	Australia and Doc Visions programmes.
2026	Busan International Film Festival	Wide Angle – Documentary Showcase.
2026	Tokyo International Film Festival	World Focus: Australia Spotlight; Japanese premiere.

== Reception ==
Critic Nadine Whitney, reviewing for The Curb, described the film as "a miracle of close documentary filmmaking."

Critic Stephen A. Russell, reviewing for ScreenHub, gave the film 4 out of 5 stars and singled out its unflinching candour and gorgeous cinematography, highlighting its deeply felt emotional resonance and relatable depiction of dealing with ailing parents.

Moviebreak, a German-language film outlet, likewise highlighted the film's emotional candour and its focus on the relationships between family members.

== Accolades ==
At the 2026 Sydney Film Festival, the film received the Documentary Australia Award, which carries an A$20,000 cash prize.
