= The Private Lives of Pippa Lee =

2009 film by Rebecca Miller

- Theatrical release poster
- Directed by: Rebecca Miller
- Screenplay by: Rebecca Miller
- Based on: The Private Lives of Pippa Lee by Rebecca Miller
- Produced by: Lemore Syvan
- Starring: Robin Wright Penn; Alan Arkin; Maria Bello; Monica Bellucci; Blake Lively; Julianne Moore; Keanu Reeves; Winona Ryder; Tim Guinee; Robin Weigert; Ryan McDonald; Zoe Kazan; Mike Binder; Shirley Knight
- Cinematography: Declan Quinn
- Edited by: Sabine Hoffmann
- Music by: Michael Rohatyn
- Production company: Plan B Entertainment
- Distributed by: Screen Media Films
- Release dates: February 9, 2009 (Berlin Festival); November 27, 2009 (United States)
- Running time: 98 minutes
- Country: United States
- Language: English
- Box office: $2.8 million

The Private Lives of Pippa Lee is a 2009 American romantic comedy-drama film written and directed by Rebecca Miller. The screenplay is based on her novel of the same name. It features an ensemble cast including Robin Wright, Alan Arkin, Maria Bello, Monica Bellucci, Blake Lively, Julianne Moore, Keanu Reeves, and Winona Ryder.

The film premiered on February 9, 2009, at the 59th Berlin International Film Festival and was shown at the Sydney Film Festival and the Edinburgh Film Festival before opening in the United Kingdom on July 10. Following a showing at the Toronto International Film Festival, it received a limited release in the United States on November 27, 2009.

== Plot ==
The film chronicles the life of Pippa Lee, with flashbacks of her tumultuous past. Pippa was the youngest child and only girl in her large Christian family. Her mother Suky was a neurotic mother with an obsessive fixation on her daughter's looks.

By her teen years, Pippa discovers that her mother takes amphetamines to self-medicate vast mood swings. She has a confrontation with her mother about her drug use, so Pippa moves in with her aunt Trish and her girlfriend Kat, who are in a lesbian menage. Trish discovers that Pippa is participating in erotic photo sessions with Kat and her friends; she is banished and goes on to live a bohemian life of drugs, working as an exotic dancer.

On a weekend jaunt with like-minded friends, Pippa meets charismatic publisher Herbert "Herb" Lee, who is 30 years older than her. A romance develops between them although he is married. Before his wife will grant him a divorce, she invites Pippa and Herb to lunch. At the table, she points the gun at Pippa before ending her own life.

Pippa and Herb marry, have two children, and once they are gone later move into a retirement home in Connecticut. Through her marriage, Pippa has become the "perfect wife" — loving, supportive, everything to everyone and no-one to herself. The couple grows apart; Herb has an affair with one of Pippa's friends and middle-aged Pippa connects with 35-year-old Chris.

After Herbert Lee dies from a cardiac arrest, Pippa breaks with her life of subservience and leaves the details of Lee's memorial, etc., to their children. The film ends with Pippa driving off with Chris.

== Cast ==
- Robin Wright as Pippa Lee
  - Blake Lively as Young Pippa
- Alan Arkin as Herbert "Herb" Lee
- Keanu Reeves as Chris Nadeau
- Maria Bello as Suky Sarkissian
- Zoe Kazan as Grace Lee
- Winona Ryder as Sandra Dulles
- Mike Binder as Sam Shapiro
- Monica Bellucci as Gigi Lee
- Ryan McDonald as Ben Lee
- Tim Guinee as Des Sarkissian
- Julianne Moore as Kat
- Shirley Knight as Dot
- Robin Weigert as Trish

== Production ==
The film was shot on location in Danbury, New Milford, Stamford, Newtown, Southbury and Derby, Connecticut.

== Critical response ==
On Rotten Tomatoes, the film has an approval rating of 69% based on 75 reviews. The site's critical consensus reads: "Reverential and offbeat, the road trip film Private lives of Pippa Lee takes emotional detours and is elevated by great performances, particularly that of Robin Wright-Penn." On Metacritic, the film has a score of 49% based on 16 reviews, indicating "mixed or average reviews".

David Gritten of The Telegraph observed: "Buttressed by a formidable cast . . . Miller navigates her story between sharp satire, dark comedy and wrenching drama. Pippa feels like a character from films of an earlier vintage, including Diary of a Mad Housewife and The Graduate; however she is less of a rebel than "Housewife's" protagonist and more non-conformist than Mrs. Robinson. Hints and traces of a playful, late 1960s mood abound. Yet Miller's film is a triumph. Uniformly well acted, it boasts a psychologically knowing script, clearly written by a smart, assertive human being rather than a software programme."

Philip French of The Observer said, "The humour is forced, the shocking revelations too sudden and not altogether convincing, but it's enjoyable in an uninvolving way."

Peter Bradshaw of The Guardian rated the film two out of five stars, calling it a "hugely overegged pudding of a film," "indulgent," "complacent," and "a film that is very pleased with itself."

Trevor Johnston of Time Out London rated the film three out of five stars and commented: "No challenge to surmise where all this is heading, but there are pleasures to be had while it takes the scenic route. With the story structure working backwards and forwards at the same time, the lack of tension is no surprise, nor does Miller help herself by flitting through a variety of moods, from period satire, whimsical imagining and character comedy to more sinewy drama. On a scene-by-scene basis, though, it's classily effective, mainly because of Wright Penn's skill in nailing the precise tenor of every moment. She's a great actress, and a subtle one, too. Anyone who can wrestle scenes away from a lovably grouchy Alan Arkin must be on top of their game."

Hannah Forbes Black from Channel 4 rated the film 2½ out of five stars, calling it a "soft-focus, chocolate-box fairytale." She continued: "The whole thing is vaguely reminiscent of post-war domestic dramas aimed at a daytime audience of housewives – like a photo-negative of Brief Encounter ... Miller's self-adapted script is no more strained and compromised than the average book-to-film adaptation, but one wishes that she'd seized this amazing opportunity to take liberties with her own work ... Toured rapidly around Pippa's life, we can see the outline of the traumas and choices that have shaped her personality, but the film doesn't seem to know what it wants to say about any of it."

Darren Amner of Eye For Film rated it three out of five stars and called the script "very wry, funny and emotionally charged."

Peter Brunette of The Hollywood Reporter called it "the kind of film that most critics desperately want to like" and added:

Unfortunately, writer-director Rebecca Miller's script tries so hard to be nervous and edgy that it ultimately succeeds only in making its viewers nervous and edgy. It's as though Miller threw a really loud party for all her Hollywood friends, but forgot to invite the audience ... The acting is top-notch (if consistently over-the-top) and the direction is perky (not to say frenzied), but the script is just immensely too much of a good thing. Virtually every character in the film, and virtually everything they say, is so self-consciously quirky that viewers quickly start wincing when they should be laughing or crying ... The film's basic structure is to alternate between Pippa's present-day life as a suburban Mom and her wild youth, but the transitions are often awkward and the polar opposite moods of each part tend to work against rather than reinforce each other. The ultimate intent of the film seems to be to make some honest points about seeking one's own happiness rather than living for the sake of others, but it also wants to be outrageous and outrageously funny at the same time, and the clash of tones is fatal.

Alissa Simon of Variety noted: "Cardboard characters and severe problems of tone fatally flaw the awkward satirical relationship drama [that] feels as schizophrenic as its eponymous heroine ... While the film marks a change of pace from the intense seriousness of Miller's earlier work, she never finds the dark comic edge that would make Pippa more satisfying viewing. Indeed, she never sustains any tone at all. The dialogue teeters from flat comedy to wince-worthy whimsy, with detours through blithe and earnest. Visual style, too, is all over the place ... Period music does a better job of evoking the era than the laughable costumes, hair and makeup."
