= Consenting Adults (1992 film) =

1992 film by Alan J. Pakula

- Theatrical release poster
- Directed by: Alan J. Pakula
- Written by: Matthew Chapman
- Produced by: Alan J. Pakula; David Permut
- Starring: Kevin Kline; Mary Elizabeth Mastrantonio; Kevin Spacey; Rebecca Miller; E. G. Marshall; Forest Whitaker
- Cinematography: Stephen Goldblatt
- Edited by: Sam O'Steen
- Music by: Michael Small
- Production companies: Hollywood Pictures; Touchwood Pacific Partners I
- Distributed by: Buena Vista Pictures Distribution
- Release date: October 16, 1992
- Running time: 95 minutes
- Country: United States
- Language: English
- Budget: $18 million
- Box office: $21,591,800

Consenting Adults is a 1992 American thriller film directed by Alan J. Pakula, and stars Kevin Kline, Mary Elizabeth Mastrantonio, Kevin Spacey and Rebecca Miller. The original music score was composed by Michael Small. The film's tagline is: "Thou shalt not covet thy neighbor's wife."

== Plot ==
Composer Richard Parker and his wife Priscilla live an ordinary suburban life until they meet their new neighbors Eddy and Kay Otis. The two couples become friends. Kay's talent for blues singing gets Richard's attention, while Eddy is attracted to Priscilla. It becomes clear that Eddy is a scam artist when he fakes a neck injury after an auto accident for the insurance proceeds (the majority of which he offers to the Parkers as a gift). Eddy chastises Richard for not living dangerously, and suggests they swap mates for an evening.

The plot takes a nasty turn when Richard does sleep with Kay (supposedly without her realizing that he is not her husband) and Kay turns up dead the next morning, bludgeoned to death by a baseball bat. Later, it is revealed that Eddy spent the night elsewhere in order to establish an airtight alibi. Richard's semen is found in her body, and his fingerprints are on the bat (from when the two couples played a friendly game of softball earlier the previous day), so he's charged with the crime. Priscilla disowns and divorces Richard due to his infidelity. Eddy soon becomes Priscilla's lover and a substitute father to Richard's daughter, Lori.

A distraught Richard finally finds a ray of hope when he hears Kay singing in a radio talent show and realizes she's alive. With the help of private investigator David Duttonville, who was hired by the insurance company from which Eddy is attempting to collect a $1.5 million indemnity claim, Richard tracks her down and learns the truth of how he was betrayed. Kay is guilt-ridden over her part in it, but terrified by Eddy's threat to implicate her if she testifies. Eddy, anticipating what Richard intends to do next, murders Kay and slips away. Implicated in a second murder, Richard flees the scene as police sirens approach.

Priscilla discovers a plane ticket Eddy used on the night of the second murder. Realizing Eddy's guilt, she worries over what to do about it. Richard performs a commando-style raid on Eddy's house, but Eddy, anticipating this move as well, reveals to Priscilla his plan to murder her and shoot Richard as a homicidal intruder. Working together, Richard and Priscilla eventually kill Eddy using the original murder weapon, the baseball bat. Richard and Priscilla are later seen moving into a very secluded house with no neighbors visible for miles.

== Cast ==
- Kevin Kline as Richard Parker
- Mary Elizabeth Mastrantonio as Priscilla Parker
- Kevin Spacey as Eddy Otis
- Rebecca Miller as Kay Otis
- Forest Whitaker as David Duttonville
- E. G. Marshall as George Gutton
- Kimberly McCullough as Lori Parker
- Benjamin Hendrickson as Jimmy Schwartz
- Billie Neal as Annie Duttonville

== Reception ==
It holds a 29% rating on Rotten Tomatoes from 14 reviews. On Metacritic it has a score of 39% based on reviews from 23 critics, indicating "generally unfavorable" reviews. Gene Siskel and Roger Ebert sharply disagreed on the movie: Siskel found it depressing, mean-spirited and lacking in well-developed characters; Ebert said it was a good thriller with very interesting characters and that "the entire movie is a comedy." The Province film critic Michale Walsh panned the film, stating, "Adults? Pond Scum, Actually."

== See also ==
- Ajnabee (2001 film), an Indian remake by Abbas–Mustan
