= DOC NYC =

Annual documentary film festival in New York City

DOC NYC America's largest documentary film festival
- Location: Greenwich Village IFC Center, Sixth Avenue at West Third Street, New York City
- Founded: 2010
- Most recent: 2025
- Artistic director: Jaie Laplante
- Festival date: Opening: 12 November 2025; Closing: 30 November 2025
- Website: www.docnyc.net
- 2026 2025

DOC NYC is an annual documentary film festival in New York City. Co-founded by Thom Powers and Raphaela Neihausen, the festival is the country's largest documentary film festival with over 300 films and events and 250 special guests. By 2014, DOC NYC had been voted by MovieMaker magazine as one of the "top five coolest documentary film festivals in the world". The festival takes place over 9 days in November at the West Village's IFC Center, Village East by Angelika, and SVA Theater.

== Overview ==
The DOC NYC Short List for documentary features officially started in 2012 with 10 titles and grew to 15 titles in 2014. It has a history of being a predictor of other awards – from critics’ prizes and top ten lists to the Oscars. For the last eight years, DOC NYC screened the documentary that went on to win the Academy Award, and the festival has screened 32 of the last 35 Oscar-nominated documentary features. The DOC NYC Short List has also had a notably strong track record for spotlighting titles that are named to the subsequent Academy Award Documentary Short List. DOC NYC's winning short will qualify for consideration in the Documentary Short Subject category of the Annual Academy Awards without the standard theatrical run, provided the film otherwise complies with the Academy rules.

In 2015, presidential nominee candidate Hillary Clinton appeared at the festival's closing night presentation of Makers: Once and For All (2015), a film about the Fourth World Conference on Women, which includes an interview with Clinton.

== Screening venues ==
- IFC Center
- Village East by Angelika
- SVA Theatre

== Festival editions ==
2026

The 17th edition of the festival will be held from November 11 to 29, 2026 in Manhattan, New York.

The DOC NYC Shortlist, a frequent predictor of winners for the Academy Awards, features screenings and Q&As for films like You Can See Everything, Musk, and American Doctor.
