= Michal Leszczylowski =

Polish-Swedish film editor

Michał Leszczyłowski
- Born: July 30, 1950 (age 76)
- Occupation: Film editor

Michał Leszczyłowski (born July 30, 1950) is a Polish-born naturalised Swedish film editor who has worked mostly in the Swedish film industry. He has won several awards, including a Guldbagge Award for Creative Achievement in 1989 and a Jussi Award for Best Editing for his work on Fire-Eater in 1999.

== Selected filmography ==
- Árru (2026) editor
- Mammoth (2008) editor
- Dalecarlians (2004) editor
- Lilya 4-ever (2002) editor
- Show Me Love (1998) editor
- Private Confessions (1996) editor
- Speak Up! It's So Dark (1993) editor
- Regi Andrej Tarkovskij (Directed by Andrei Tarkovsky) (1988) director
- The Sacrifice (1986) editor
