= Alexis Alexanian =

American independent film producer

- Occupation: Film producer
- Organization(s): Elixir Films (co-founder); New York Women in Film & Television (President, 2012); Locomotive (President of Production, 2014)
- Known for: Mississippi Burning (1988), Tape (2001), Personal Velocity: Three Portraits (2002)
- Relatives: David Alexanian (brother)

Alexis Alexanian is an American independent film producer. Her production credits include Mississippi Burning (1988), Tape (2001), and Personal Velocity: Three Portraits (2002). In 2012, she was elected president of the board of directors for New York Women in Film & Television. In 2014, she was named President of Production at Locomotive. She is the sister of David Alexanian, with whom she founded Elixir Films.
