= Rehearsals for a Revolution =

2026 documentary film by Pegah Ahangarani

- U.S. theatrical release poster
- Persian: خاطرات ایران
- Directed by: Pegah Ahangarani
- Written by: Pegah Ahangarani
- Produced by: Kaveh Farnam; Adrià Monés
- Starring: Pegah Ahangarani
- Edited by: Arash Ashtiani
- Music by: Anna Andreu
- Production company: Media Nest
- Distributed by: Elastica Films (Spain)
- Release date: 16 May 2026 (Cannes)
- Running time: 101 minutes
- Countries: Czech Republic; Spain
- Language: Persian

Rehearsals for a Revolution (Persian: خاطرات ایران) is a 2026 documentary film directed by Pegah Ahangarani. A co-production of the Czech Republic and Spain, it follows the recent Iranian history, from its Revolution to the 2026 war, through Ahangarani's personal memories.

The film had its world premiere at the Special Screening section of the 2026 Cannes Film Festival on 16 May, where it won the L'Œil d'or. It was also selected as the British entry for Best International Feature Film at the 99th Academy Awards.

== Premise ==
Through five portraits of family members and mentors, and five different forms of resistance, actress and filmmaker Pegah Ahangarani traces the intimate story of her life and, at the same time, of her country. Drawing on personal archives, home movies, recordings of street protests, newspaper reports, and oral testimonies, she reconstructs more than four decades of Iran's history.

From the early days of the Revolution to the war that began in 2026, Ahangarani reassembles a memory that is both personal and collective to shape the portrait of a country marked by political repression and the persistent hope.

== Release ==
The film had its world premiere at the Special Screening Section of the 2026 Cannes Film Festival on 16 May, where it won the L'Œil d'or. It had its North American premiere at the 53rd Telluride Film Festival. It was also programmed in the 'Time of History' selection of the 71st Valladolid International Film Festival.

A few days after its Cannes premiere, Sony Pictures Classics acquired distribution rights to the documentary in North and Latin America, New Zealand, Turkey, Portugal and Asia excluding Japan, as well as worldwide airlines. Jour2Fête will handle French distribution, while The Party Film Sales is handling worldwide sales. Elastica Films secured Spanish distribution.

== Reception ==
=== Critical response ===
Alissa Simon, writing for Variety, praised the documentary as a "compelling personal perspective on Iran and its discontents." Similarly Jonathan Romney, for Screendaily, mentions that this film reveals both personal and politically insightful and sums the work up as an "intensely intelligent work." Cédric Succivalli

=== Accolades ===
Award	Date of ceremony	Category	Recipient(s)	Result	Ref.
Cannes Film Festival	23 May 2026	L'Œil d'or	Rehearsals for a Revolution	Won	
Golden Globes Documentary Prize Event	4 September 2026	Special Jury Award	Rehearsals for a Revolution	Won	
Cinema Eye Honors	11 January 2027	Outstanding Achievement in Nonfiction Feature Filmmaking	Pegah Ahangarani, Kaveh Farnam, Adria Mones, Arash Ashtiani, Neda Mohseni, and Dani Zacaria	Pending	
Cinema Eye Honors	11 January 2027	Outstanding Achievement in Direction	Pegah Ahangarani	Pending	
Cinema Eye Honors	11 January 2027	Outstanding Achievement in Archival Artistry	Arash Ashtiani	Pending	
European Film Awards	16 January 2027	Best European Film	Rehearsals for a Revolution	Pending	
European Film Awards	16 January 2027	Best Documentary	Rehearsals for a Revolution	Pending	

== See also ==
- List of submissions to the 99th Academy Awards for Best International Feature Film
- List of British submissions for the Academy Award for Best International Feature Film
