= A Fox Under a Pink Moon =

Iranian documentary

- روباه و ماه صورتی
- Directed by: Mehrdad Oskouei; Soraya Akhalaghi
- Screenplay by: Mehrdad Oskouei; Amir Adibparvar; Siavash Jamali
- Produced by: Mehrdad Oskouei; Siavash Jamali
- Cinematography: Soraya Akhalaghi
- Edited by: Amir Adibparvar
- Music by: Afshin Azizi
- Production companies: Oskouei Films; Cat & Docs; InMaat Foundation; Bertha Foundation; Catapult Film Fund; Bird Street Productions; International Media Support
- Distributed by: Kino Lorber
- Release dates: November 16, 2025 (IDFA); December 2, 2026 (United States)
- Running time: 76 minutes
- Countries: Iran; France; United Kingdom; United States; Denmark
- Languages: Persian; Dari

A Fox Under a Pink Moon is a 2025 internationally co-produced documentary film directed by Mehrdad Oskouei and Soraya Akhalaghi.

It had its world premiere at the International Documentary Film Festival Amsterdam on November 16, 2025, where it won Best International Documentary. It is scheduled to be released in the United States on December 2, 2026, by Kino Lorber.

== Synopsis ==
Soraya, a 16-year-old Afghan artist, spent five years trying to flee Iran to reach Austria. During this time, she filmed herself, documenting her escape attempts, her abusive marriage, and her drawings and sculptures that express her struggle. Some of her drawings appear in the film, including a fox that accompanies her on her journey and a pink moon that constantly watches over her.

== Awards and nominations ==
Award	Date of ceremony	Category	Result	Ref.
IDFA	2025	Best International Documentary	Won	
HUMAN International Documentary Film Festival	2026	HUMAN Rights Human Wrongs Award	Won	
Tempo Documentary Festival	2026	Stefan Jarl International Documentary Award	Won	
FIFDH	2026	Grand Prix de Genève	Won	
FIFDH	2026	Prix du Jury des Jeunes	Won	
One World International Film Festival	2026	International Competition Award for the Best Director	Won	
Sofia International Film Festival	2026	Special Mention	Won	
Docville	2026	Jury Award for Best International Documentary	Won	
Docville	2026	Nationale Loterij Audience Award	Won	
Ishigaki Islander's Film Festival		Impact Award	Won	
Pordenone Docs Fest		Jury Grand Prix	Won	
Millenium International Documentary Film Festival	2026	Bronze Objective (Best Film on Human Rights)	Won	
Millenium International Documentary Film Festival	2026	Cinéfemme Award	Won	
Full Frame Documentary Film Festival	2026	Full Frame Grand Jury Award	Won	
Full Frame Documentary Film Festival	2026	Duke University’s Center for Documentary Studies (CDS) Filmmaker Award	Won	
ZagrebDox	2026	Big Stamp Award for Best Film	Won	
Festival du Cinéma Documentaire en Aubrac		Best Documentary Award	Won	
Festival International Jean Rouch	2026	Jury INALCO Special Mention	Won	
Festival International Jean Rouch	2026	Migrations Prize Award	Won	
DocsBarcelona	2026	Youth Jury – Reteena Award	Won	
Millennium Docs Against Gravity Film Festival	2026	Main Competition Grand Prix Special Mention	Won	
Millennium Docs Against Gravity Film Festival	2026	Main Competition FIPRESCI Award	Won	
Millennium Docs Against Gravity Film Festival	2026	Amnesty International Poland Award	Won	
Millennium Docs Against Gravity Film Festival	2026	Gdynia Emigration Museum Compass Award	Won	
