= The Fox (2025 film) =

Australian comedy film

- Theatrical release poster
- Directed by: Dario Russo
- Written by: Dario Russo
- Produced by: Kristina Ceyton; Samantha Jennings; Carly Maple
- Starring: Jai Courtney; Emily Browning; Damon Herriman; Claudia Doumit; Zlatko Burić; Sam Neill; Miranda Otto; Olivia Colman
- Cinematography: Matthew Chuang
- Edited by: Dario Russo
- Music by: Dario Russo
- Production company: Causeway Films
- Distributed by: Madman Entertainment; JORR Integrated Film and Television Solutions
- Release dates: 19 October 2025 (AFF); 26 November 2026 (Australia)
- Running time: 90 minutes
- Country: Australia
- Language: English

The Fox is a 2025 Australian black comedy fantasy film written and directed by Dario Russo, in his directorial debut. It stars Jai Courtney, Emily Browning, Damon Herriman, Claudia Doumit, Zlatko Burić, and Miranda Otto, along with the voices of Sam Neill (his last film role to be released in his lifetime) and Olivia Colman.

The film premiered at the Adelaide Film Festival on 19 October 2025, and is scheduled to be released in Australia on 26 November 2026. The film received overwhelmingly positive reviews from critics.

== Synopsis ==
Described as a "darkly comic folktale", the film tells the story of a hunter who encounters a talking fox with a proposal to solve his problems, after his fiancée, Kori, has cheated on him.

== Cast ==
- Jai Courtney as Nick, the hunter
- Emily Browning as Kori, Nick's fiancée
- Olivia Colman as the Fox (voice)
- Damon Herriman as Derek
- Claudia Doumit as Diana
- Zlatko Burić as Kori's father
- Sam Neill as the Magpie (voice)
- Miranda Otto as Liz
- Frankie J. Holden
- Heather Mitchell
- Kim Gyngell

== Production ==
The Fox is the feature film directorial debut from Adelaide filmmaker Dario Russo, creator of the early YouTube comedy classic Italian Spiderman in 2005, and co-creator of spy parody TV series Danger 5 in 2012. Russo also wrote the script and the music, and edited the film. Cinematography was by Matthew Chuang.

The film is produced by Kristina Ceyton and Samantha Jennings of Causeway Films (which also produced Talk To Me, The Babadook, You Won't Be Alone, and Buoyancy). Carly Maple is also a producer.

Funding and investments were provided by the South Australian Film Corporation, Screen Australia, Orogen Entertainment, A-Up Duck Productions, Kojo Studios, Flickstar, and the Adelaide Film Festival Investment Fund.

== Release ==
The film premiered at the Adelaide Film Festival on 19 October 2025. It also screened at the 2026 Sydney Film Festival, where it won the Audience Award for "Best Australian Feature".

The film will be distributed in Australia on 26 November 2026 by Madman Entertainment. It is set to be released in the United States on 4 December 2026 by Aura Entertainment.

It will be screened in Panorama section of the 59th Sitges Film Festival in October 2026.

== Critical reception ==
According to Metacritic, the film received "mixed or average" reviews based on a weighted average score of 60 out of 100 from five critic scores. On Rotten Tomatoes, 91% of eleven critic reviews are positive and the average rating is 7 out of 10.
