= Personal Velocity: Three Portraits =

2002 film by Rebecca Miller

- Theatrical release poster
- Directed by: Rebecca Miller
- Written by: Rebecca Miller
- Produced by: Alexis Alexanian; Caroline Kaplan; Jonathan Sehring; John Sloss
- Starring: Kyra Sedgwick; Parker Posey; Fairuza Balk
- Cinematography: Ellen Kuras
- Edited by: Sabine Hoffmann
- Music by: Michael Rohatyn
- Distributed by: United Artists (through MGM Distribution Co.)
- Release dates: January 12, 2002 (Sundance); November 22, 2002 (United States)
- Running time: 86 minutes
- Country: United States
- Language: English
- Budget: $125,000
- Box office: $811,299

Personal Velocity: Three Portraits is a 2002 American drama film written and directed by Rebecca Miller. It stars Kyra Sedgwick, Parker Posey, and Fairuza Balk as three women who escape from their afflicted lives as each struggles to flee from the men who confine their personal freedom.

Personal Velocity: Three Portraits premiered at the Sundance Film Festival on January 12, 2002, where it won the Grand Jury Prize and the Excellence in Cinematography Award. It was theatrically released in the United States on November 22, 2002 to positive reviews from critics. At the 18th Independent Spirit Awards, Miller won the John Cassavetes Award, while Posey was nominated for Best Female Lead, and Kuras was nominated for Best Cinematography.

== Plot ==
Personal Velocity is a tale of three women who have reached a turning point in their lives. Delia is a spirited, working-class woman from a small town in New York state who leaves her abusive husband and sets out on a journey to reclaim the power she has lost. Greta is a sharp, spunky editor who is rotten with ambition. To spite the hated unfaithful ways of her father, she has settled into a complacent relationship and is struggling (not too hard) with issues of fidelity to her kind but unexciting husband. Finally Paula, who ran away from home and got pregnant, is now in a relationship she doesn't want. She's a troubled young woman who takes off on a journey with a hitchhiker after a strange, fateful encounter on a New York street.

== Cast ==
- Kyra Sedgwick as Delia Shunt
- Parker Posey as Greta Herskowitz
- Fairuza Balk as Paula
- John Ventimiglia as Narrator
- Ron Leibman as Avram Herskovitz
- Wallace Shawn as Mr. Gelb
- Susan Blommaert as Mrs. Toron
- David Warshofsky as Kurt Wurtzle
- Leo Fitzpatrick as Mylert
- Tim Guinee as Lee
- Nicole Murphy as May Wurtzle

== Release ==
=== Critical reception ===
On review aggregator website Rotten Tomatoes, the film has an approval rating of 69% based on 103 reviews, and an average rating of 6.5/10. The website's critical consensus states that the film is an "uneven, but a keenly observed and well-acted film about three women's lives." On Metacritic, the film has a weighted average score of 70 out of 100, based on 28 critics, indicating "generally favorable reviews".

== Awards and nominations ==
Award	Category	Recipient(s)	Result
18th Independent Spirit Awards	John Cassavetes Award	Rebecca Miller	Won
18th Independent Spirit Awards	Best Female Lead	Parker Posey	Nominated
18th Independent Spirit Awards	Best Cinematography	Ellen Kuras	Nominated
International Istanbul Film Festival	Golden Tulip	Rebecca Miller	Nominated
International Istanbul Film Festival	Special Prize of the Jury	Rebecca Miller	Nominated
International Istanbul Film Festival	People's Choice Award	Rebecca Miller	Nominated

Awards
Preceded by The Believer	Sundance Grand Jury Prize: U.S. Dramatic; 2002	Succeeded by American Splendor
