= Arthur Miller: Writer =

- Directed by: Rebecca Miller
- Produced by: Damon Cardasis; Cindy Tolan
- Edited by: David Bartner
- Music by: Michael Rohatyn
- Release date: December 8, 2017
- Running time: 98 minutes
- Country: United States
- Language: English

Arthur Miller: Writer is a 2017 documentary film by Rebecca Miller about her father, the American playwright of the same name. The film premiered at the 2017 Telluride Film Festival. After airing on HBO, it was nominated for an Emmy for Outstanding Arts & Culture Documentary at the 40th News and Documentary Emmy Awards.

== Reception ==
On review aggregator website Rotten Tomatoes, the film holds an approval rating of 91% based on 11 reviews, with an average rating of 8.4/10.
