= Poh Si Teng =

Malaysian-American journalist and filmmaker

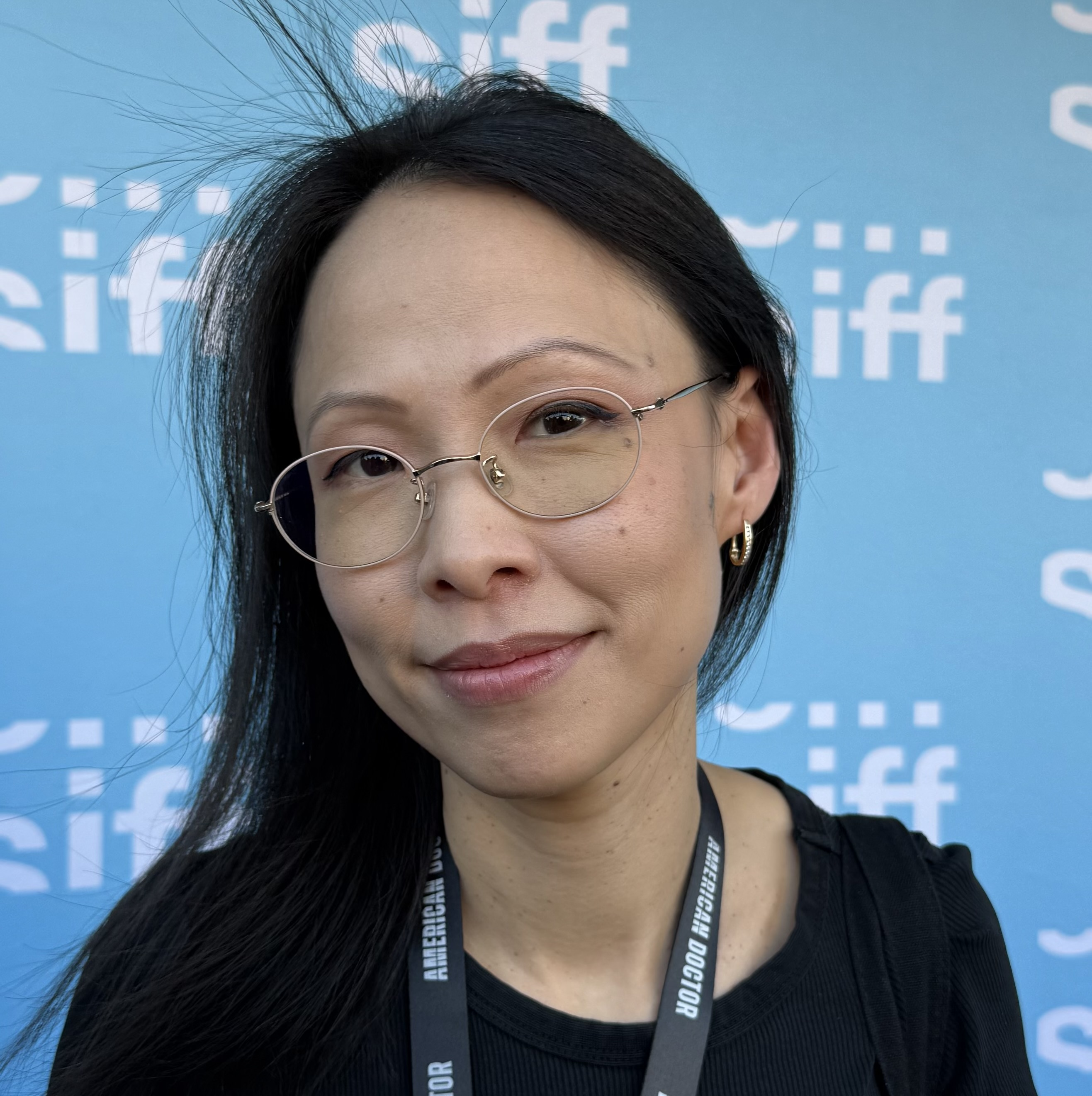
- Teng at SIFF 2026
- Born: Malaysia
- Education: San Francisco State University (BA)
- Occupations: Journalist, documentary filmmaker
- Known for: St. Louis Superman, American Doctor
- Awards: Critics' Choice Award (2020)

Poh Si Teng is a Malaysian-American journalist and documentary filmmaker. She is known for producing the Academy Award-nominated documentary short St. Louis Superman (2019) and directing the feature documentary American Doctor (2026). She has held leadership roles at the International Documentary Association, Al Jazeera English, and The New York Times.

== Early life and education ==
Teng was born and raised in Malaysia. She attended public school in Perai and Butterworth before receiving a scholarship to Taylor's College in Kuala Lumpur.

She later moved to the United States as an international student to study journalism at San Francisco State University, graduating in 2007. During her time at SFSU, she wrote for the student-run newspaper, the Golden Gate Xpress.

== Career ==
Teng began her career as an independent filmmaker and journalist based in India for several years. She subsequently joined The New York Times as a staff journalist. During her tenure, she received an Emmy Award nomination for Outstanding Interview and was recognized with a Society of Professional Journalists' Deadline Award and an NPPA award.

=== Commissioning and leadership roles ===
Teng served as a documentary commissioner for Al Jazeera English, overseeing the Americas for the flagship documentary strand Witness. While at Al Jazeera, she produced the documentary short St. Louis Superman, which follows the life of activist and battle rapper Bruce Franks Jr. The film was nominated for the Academy Award for Best Documentary Short Film at the 92nd Academy Awards and won a Critics' Choice Award in 2020.

Following her time at Al Jazeera, she became the Director of Funds and the Enterprise Program at the International Documentary Association (IDA). In that role, she established grants for filmmakers with disabilities with support from the Ford Foundation. She later transitioned to ABC News Studios (Disney) as an Executive Editorial Producer.

=== Filmmaking ===
In 2024, Teng departed her role at ABC News Studios to direct her feature debut, American Doctor. The documentary, which premiered at the 2026 Sundance Film Festival, follows a group of American doctors providing medical aid in Gaza between 2024 and 2025. To fund the initial production, Teng used $150,000 of her personal savings. The film was the winner of the Audience Award at the 2026 Hot Docs Canadian International Documentary Festival.

She served as an executive producer for the documentary Patrice: The Movie, which won a 2025 Emmy Award for Exceptional Merit in Documentary Filmmaking.

== Awards ==
- DOC NYC's "40 Under 40 Filmmakers to Watch"
- Society of Professional Journalists' Deadline Award
- NPPA Award
