= November 2026 airstrike on Nasser Hospital =

2026 Israeli airstrike

Airstrike on Nasser Hospital
- Part of attacks hospitals during the Gaza war
- Location: 31°20′50″N 34°17′35″E; Nasser Hospital, Khan Younis, Gaza Strip, Palestine
- Date: 11–12 November 2026; 00:30 (UTC+02:00)
- Target: Nasser Hospital
- Attack type: Airstrike
- Weapon: 2 missiles (made in the U.S.)
- Deaths: 6 or 7
- Injuries: 52
- Assailant: Israel Defense Forces
- Motive: Attempted targeted killing

After midnight on the night of 11–12 November 2026, an Israeli airstrike hit Nasser Hospital in Khan Younis in the Gaza Strip, Palestine. The attack killed six people, including Dr. Rizk Abu Shaaira and a 13-year-old child, and injured an additional 52 people.

== Background ==
The hospital has been attacked many times since the start of the genocidal war on Gaza. The strike was the seventh attack on the hospital and the second on the surgical ward. A previous attack on the hospital, in 2024, killed 12-year-old Donia Abu Mohsen.

== Timing and munitions ==
At 12:30 am on Thursday 12 November 2026, an Israeli airstrike hit the hospital. The attack occurred despite a ceasefire being in place. The airstrike used two missiles, one of which failed to explode. The Intercept reported that the missiles were manufactured in the United States.

The bombing targeted the surgery department. The attack caused extensive damage to the hospital. The operating rooms were extensively damaged, the surgery department became unusable, and the intensive care department was unable to be accessed. There would have been even more extensive damage if both missiles had detonated as planned.

== Israeli claim of responsibility ==
The Israel Defense Forces (IDF) and Shin Bet released a joint statement claiming responsibility for the attack on the hospital, and additionally confessing that it was a targeted attack intended to kill a specific individual. The target was Muhammad Abu Ismail, whom they described as "the commander of Hamas' Khan Younis Brigade". The Israeli military also claimed the hospital was being used as a "Hamas command centre".

At the time, Israelis were continuing to block the entry of medical supplies into the Gaza Strip. SBS News spoke to an Australian doctor who recently returned from a deployment at Nasser Hospital, she said that her own health has suffered due to limited food supplies.

== Casualties ==
The airstrike killed six or more people. Early reports said that 20 or more people had been injured. Updated reports on Friday 13 November said that 52 people had been injured. Also on the 13 November, Al Jazeera Arabic reported that the number of deaths had risen to seven, saying that a seventh person had subsequently died of their injuries.

One of the people killed was general surgery specialist Dr Rizq Abu Shaeera (Arabic: رزق أبو شعيرة). Dr Abu Shaeera had been offered an opportunity to evacuate, but declined the offer because he was unwilling to abandon his patients. He also appeared in the film American Doctor.

Another general surgery specialist, Dr Mohammed Qdeih, was wounded in the attack.

The airstrike also killed a 13-year-old child.

== See also ==
- August 2025 Nasser Hospital strikes
- Timeline of the Gaza Strip healthcare collapse
- Timeline of the Gaza war (3 October 2025 – present)
- First Geneva Convention – "the Amelioration of the Condition of the Wounded in Armies in the Field"
