= The Oldest Person in the World =

2026 documentary film

- Directed by: Sam Green
- Produced by: Alison Byrne Fields; Josh Penn
- Cinematography: Yoni Brook
- Edited by: Sam Green; Aaron Wickenden
- Music by: William Ryan Fritch; T. Griffin
- Release date: January 23, 2026 (Sundance)
- Running time: 87 minutes
- Country: United States
- Language: English
- Box office: $8,044

The Oldest Person in the World is a 2026 American documentary film directed by Sam Green, which explores over a decade the record holders of the title of oldest person alive.

== Reception ==
On the review aggregator website Rotten Tomatoes, 86% of 36 critics' reviews are positive, with an average rating of 8/10. Metacritic, which uses a weighted average, assigned the film a score of 75 out of 100, based on 10 critics, indicating "generally favorable" reviews.

Peter Debruge of Variety wrote, "In its more philosophical moments, The Oldest Person in the World is the best kind of cinematic experience: an entertaining and enlightening 'meaning of life' movie."
