= Pegah Ahangarani =

Iranian actress and film director (born 1984)

- پگاه آهنگرانی
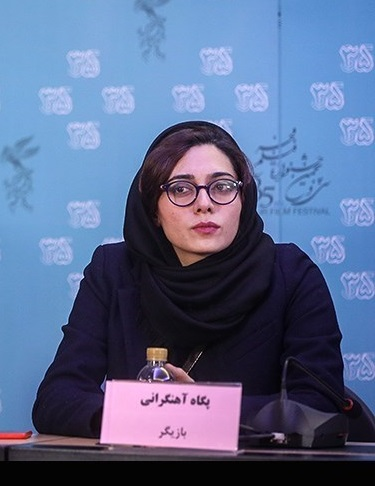
- Ahangarani at the 35th Fajr Film Festival (2017)
- Born: Pegah Ahangarani Farahani; 24 July 1984 (age 42); Arak, Iran
- Occupations: Actress; film director
- Years active: 1990–present
- Parents: Jamshid Ahangarani (father); Manijeh Hekmat (mother)

Pegah Ahangarani (Persian: پگاه آهنگرانی; born 24 July 1984) is a prominent Iranian filmmaker and actress with a career spanning over three decades. Following her breakthrough performance in The Girl in the Sneakers (1999) and a filmography of over 40 feature films, Ahangarani expanded her practice into documentary filmmaking alongside her acting. Her directorial work includes the essay documentaries I Am Trying to Remember (2021) and My Father (2023), as well as Child Soldier (2024) and Taraneh (2025). Her films have received critical acclaim and garnered prestigious awards at international festivals including IDFA and Busan.

Ahangarani left her studies in music after attending an art conservatory and focused on acting. She has also gained experience in directing, producing, and documentary filmmaking.

She first appeared on screen in 1990 at the age of six in the film The Singing Cat. She rose to fame at 15 with her performance in the film The Girl with Sneakers, directed by Rasoul Sadrameli.

== Arrests ==
Ahangarani was arrested on 27 July 2009 in the wake of the turmoil after the 2009 presidential election, allegedly for her work in support of opposition candidate Mir-Hossein Mousavi. She was later released but arrested again on 10 July 2011 prior to her planned trip to Germany to report on the 2011 FIFA Women's World Cup for the Persian service of the German broadcaster Deutsche Welle. She was released from Evin Prison two weeks later on the equivalent of $84,000 bail after expressions of "outrage among foreign governments and human rights organizations".

== Personal Life and Family ==
After emigrating from Iran, Pegah Ahangarani settled in the UK, where she later married Ali Azimi, an Iranian singer and composer.

== Filmography ==
As Director

- Rehearsals for a Revolution (2026)
- As I Lay Dying (2025)
- Taraneh (2025, BBC World Service, feature documentary) (an intimate portrait of acclaimed actress Taraneh Alidoosti, exploring her support for the "Woman, Life, Freedom" movement, her subsequent imprisonment and illness.
- Child Soldiers (2024, BBC World Service, feature documentary) Commissioned documentary examining the lives of child soldiers in the Iran Iraq war.
- My Father (2023, essay film 18 min)
- Premiered at IDFA – International Documentary Film Festival Amsterdam.
- Special Mention Award.
- I Am Trying to Remember (2021, essay film, 14 min)
- Premiered at IDFA, Hot Docs, IDA Documentary Awards, and numerous other festivals.
- Winner of several awards.
- Published by The New Yorker (documentary platform).

== Awards and nominations ==
- Gold frame, Short focus London film festival (2024) - My Father
- Best Documentary, Riga International Short Film Festival (2024) - My Father
- Jury Award, Florence short film Festival (2024) - My Father
- Special Mention, IDFA (2023) – My Father
- Special Jury Award, Porto Femme International Film Festival (2023) – I Am Trying to Remember
- Best Documentary, Persian Film Festival Australia (2023) – I Am Trying to Remember
- Special Mention, Dokufest (2022) – I Am Trying to Remember
- Special Jury Award, Makedox Film Festival (2022) – I Am Trying to Remember
- Jury Award, Bussan Short Film Festival
- IDFA, Hot Docs, and IDA Official Selection (2021) – I Am Trying to Remember
- Published by The New Yorker Documentary (2021)
- Best Actress Awards at multiple international film festivals

== See also ==
- List of Iranian actresses
