= Time and Water =

2026 documentary by Sara Dosa

- Theatrical release poster
- Directed by: Sara Dosa
- Produced by: Jameka Autry; Shane Boris; Sara Dosa; Elijah Stevens
- Cinematography: Pablo Alvarez-Mesa
- Edited by: Erin Casper; Jocelyne Chaput; Mark Harrison
- Music by: Dan Deacon
- Production companies: Sandbox Films; Signpost Pictures
- Distributed by: National Geographic Documentary Films; 1-2 Special
- Release dates: January 27, 2026 (Sundance); May 29, 2026 (United States)
- Running time: 93 minutes
- Countries: Iceland; United States
- Languages: Icelandic; English
- Box office: $168,603

Time and Water is a 2026 documentary film which explores life and work of Icelandic writer Andri Snær Magnason. It is produced and directed by Sara Dosa. The film premiered at the 2026 Sundance Film Festival.

== Reception ==
On the review aggregator website Rotten Tomatoes, 91% of 46 critics' reviews are positive. The website's consensus reads: "Visually astounding and hands-off in its observation of a family and their environment, Time and Water is an intimate documentary with an epic scope." Metacritic, which uses a weighted average, assigned the film a score of 76 out of 100, based on 14 critics, indicating "generally favorable" reviews.

Zachary Lee of RogerEbert.com gave the film three and a half out of four stars and wrote, "Time and Water is very much a project trying to capture memory, time, and history, even as it melts before your eyes. I shudder to think that after the film's premiere at Sundance, what the condition of Iceland's glaciers may look like now." Murtada Elfadl of Variety wrote, "With Time and Water, Dosa turns the climate crisis into something heartbreakingly tangible. She and her collaborators create not just an urgent documentary, but a profoundly beautiful elegy for a world slipping away before our eyes." In a Critics' Pick review for IndieWire, Marya E. Gates noted the film's unique mixture of autobiography and nature doc, calling it "a poetic musing on intergenerational memory, a whimsical, yet staunchly political elegy for the glaciers, and a mournful look at the Earth in all her majesty and mystery."

=== Accolades ===
Award	Date	Category	Recipient(s)	Result	Ref.
Critics' Choice Documentary Awards	November 8, 2026	Best Science/Nature Documentary	Time and Water	Nominated	
Critics' Choice Documentary Awards	November 8, 2026	Best Score	Dan Deacon	Nominated	
Cinema Eye Honors	January 11, 2027	Audience Choice Prize	Time and Water	Pending	
Cinema Eye Honors	January 11, 2027	Outstanding Achievement in Direction	Sara Dosa	Pending	
Cinema Eye Honors	January 11, 2027	Outstanding Achievement in Editing	Erin Casper, Jocelyne Chaput and Mark Harrison	Pending	
Cinema Eye Honors	January 11, 2027	Outstanding Achievement in Original Music Score	Dan Deacon	Pending	
Cinema Eye Honors	January 11, 2027	Outstanding Achievement in Sound Design	Björn Viktorsson, Atli Arnarsson and Jón Atli Magnússon	Pending	
Cinema Eye Honors	January 11, 2027	Outstanding Achievement in Visual Design	Lucy Munger	Pending	
