= Mr. Scorsese =

2025 documentary series

- Promotional poster
- Genre: Documentary
- Directed by: Rebecca Miller
- Starring: Martin Scorsese
- Country of origin: United States
- Original language: English
- No. of episodes: 5

Production
- Executive producers: Damon Cardasis; Cindy Tolan; Rebecca Miller; Rick Yorn; Julie Yorn; Christopher Donnelly
- Producer: Ron Burkle
- Editor: David Bartner
- Production companies: Round Films; Moxie Pictures; LBI Entertainment; Expanded Media; Apple Studios

Original release
- Network: Apple TV
- Release: October 17, 2025

Mr. Scorsese is a five-part documentary series directed by Rebecca Miller about American filmmaker Martin Scorsese. It features interviews with Robert De Niro, Mick Jagger, Steven Spielberg, and other friends, family and creative collaborators.

The series had its world premiere at the 2025 New York Film Festival, followed by its global digital release on Apple TV on October 17, 2025. It received critical acclaim.

== Production ==
Mr. Scorsese was in production for several years prior to its official announcement on May 21, 2025. The series was originally intended to be a feature-length documentary, but expanded to five parts. Explaining the change, director Rebecca Miller stated that the change came about because Scorsese's "work and life are so vast and so compelling". Miller described the film series as "one of the defining experiences" of her career. The series covers Scorsese's life from his time as a student at New York University to present day. Miller was given "unrestricted access" to Scorsese's personal archives for the project.

== Episodes ==
No.	Title	Directed by	Original release date
1	"Stranger in a Strange Land"	Rebecca Miller	October 17, 2025
2	"All This Filming Isn't Healthy"	Rebecca Miller	October 17, 2025
3	"Saint/Sinner"	Rebecca Miller	October 17, 2025
4	"Total Cinema"	Rebecca Miller	October 17, 2025
5	"Method Director"	Rebecca Miller	October 17, 2025

== Reception ==
=== Critical response ===
On the review aggregator website Rotten Tomatoes, the series holds a 98% approval rating, based on 63 critic reviews, with an average rating of 8.6/10. The website's consensus reads: "By being just as interested in Martin Scorsese the man as it is in Martin Scorsese the director, Rebecca Miller's rollicking documentary provides as revelatory a portrait of the master filmmaker as admirers could've ever hoped for." Metacritic, which uses a weighted average, gave a score of 84 out of 100, based on 26 critics, indicating "universal acclaim".

=== Awards and nominations ===
Year	Award	Category	Recipient(s)	Result	Ref.
2025	Critics' Choice Documentary Awards	Best Biographical Documentary	Mr. Scorsese	Won	
2025	Critics' Choice Documentary Awards	Best Limited Documentary Series	Mr. Scorsese	Won	
2026	ACE Eddie Awards	Best Edited Documentary Series	David Bartner (for "All This Filming Isn't Healthy")	Nominated	
2026	Astra TV Awards	Best Docuseries or Nonfiction Series	Mr. Scorsese	Nominated	
2026	Critics' Choice Real TV Awards	Best Limited Series	Mr. Scorsese	Won	
2026	Directors Guild of America Awards	Outstanding Directorial Achievement in Documentary Series / News	Rebecca Miller (for "All This Filming Isn't Healthy")	Won	
2026	Dorian TV Awards	Best TV Documentary or Documentary Series	Mr. Scorsese	Won	
2026	Gotham TV Awards	Breakthrough Nonfiction Series	Damon Cardasis, Chris Donnelly, Rebecca Miller, Cindy Tolan, Julie Yorn, and Rick Yorn	Nominated	
2026	Guild of Music Supervisors Awards	Best Music Supervision for a Docuseries	Linda Cohen	Nominated	
2026	IndieWire Honors	Magnify Award	Rebecca Miller	Honored	
2026	Primetime Emmy Awards	Outstanding Documentary or Nonfiction Series	Damon Cardasis, Cindy Tolan, Rebecca Miller, Rick Yorn, Christopher Donnelly, Julie Yorn, Robert Fernandez, Patrick Walmsley, and Ron Burkle	Won	
2026	Primetime Emmy Awards	Outstanding Directing for a Documentary/Nonfiction Program	Rebecca Miller (for "All This Filming Isn't Healthy")	Nominated	
2026	Primetime Emmy Awards	Outstanding Picture Editing for a Nonfiction Program	David Bartner (for "Stranger in a Strange Land")	Nominated	
2026	Producers Guild of America Awards	Outstanding Producer of Non-Fiction Television	Damon Cardasis, Cindy Tolan, Rebecca Miller, Rick Yorn, Christopher Donnelly, Julie Yorn, Ron Burkle, Robert Fernandez, and Patrick Walmsley	Nominated	
2026	Satellite Awards	Best Miniseries & Limited Series or Motion Picture Made for Television	Mr. Scorsese	Nominated	
2026	TCA Awards	Outstanding Achievement in News and Information	Mr. Scorsese	Nominated	
