= Árru =

2026 film by Elle Sofe Sara

- Directed by: Elle Sofe Sara
- Written by: Johan Fasting; Elle Sofe Sara
- Produced by: Elisa Fernanda Pirir; Mimmi Spång; Jani Pösö; Espen Nomedal; Ragna N. Midtgard
- Starring: Sara Marielle Gaup Beaska; Ayla Nutti; Simon Issát Marainen
- Cinematography: Cecilie Semec
- Edited by: Michal Leszczylowski
- Music by: John Erik Kaada
- Production company: Stær AS
- Release date: 16 February 2026 (Berlinale)
- Running time: 110 minutes
- Countries: Norway; Sweden; Finland
- Language: Sámi

Árru is a 2026 drama film directed by Elle Sofe Sara in her directorial debut, from the screenplay she co-wrote with Johan Fasting. It stars Sara Marielle Gaup Beaska as Maia, a reindeer herder. It is the first feature film about the joik.

The film had its world premiere at the Panorama section of the 76th Berlin International Film Festival on 16 February 2026.

== Premise ==
Set in Sápmi, Maia, a reindeer herder, fights to protect her ancestral land from mining.

== Cast ==
- Sara Marielle Gaup Beaska as Maia
- Ayla Nutti as Áilin
- Simon Issát Marainen as Dánel
- Mikkel Gaup

== Production ==
It is a Norwegian-Swedish-Finnish international co-production. Development began in January 2021 when Norwegian production company Mer Film initially announced the project as its slate, with Elle Sofe Sara attached to direct and Elisa Fernanda Pirir to produce. In January 2023, Pirir left the company and founded her own production company, Stær Film, to which the project subsequently moved.

In February 2021, the project was selected to participate at the Nordic Film Market, held during the Gothenburg Film Festival. In September 2022, it was announced as one of the six projects backed by the New Dawn fund. It participated at the Work in Progress section of the 2024 Les Arcs Film Festival. In January 2025, it returned to the Nordic Film Market to be showcased at the Works in Progress section. It was also showcased at the New Nordic Films market, held during the Norwegian International Film Festival, in August 2025.

== Release ==
Árru had its world premiere at the Panorama section of the 76th Berlin International Film Festival on 16 February 2026. Ahead of its premiere, The Yellow Affair acquired the film's international sales.
