= Rebecca Miller =

American actress and film director (born 1962)

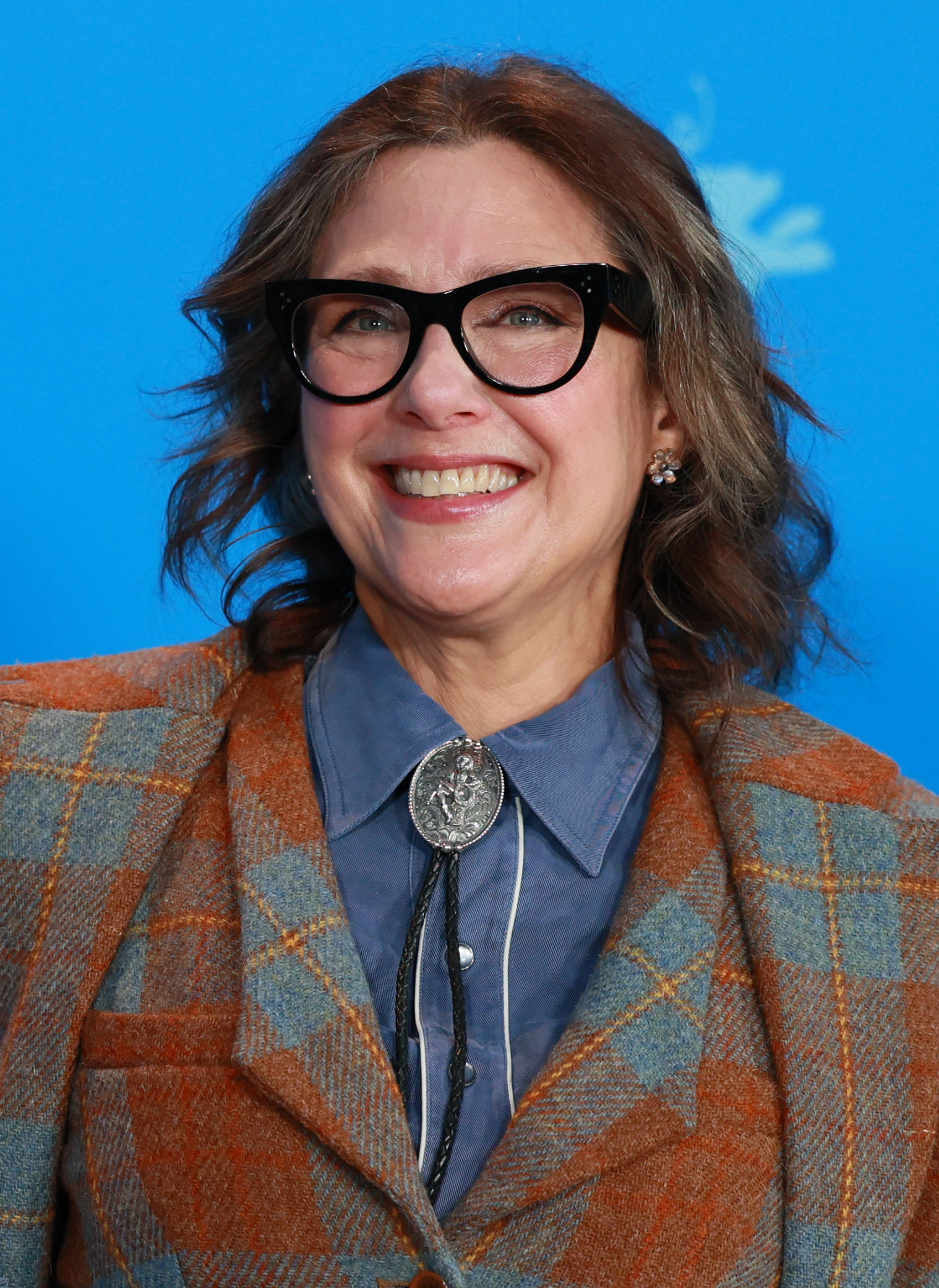
- Miller at the 2023 Berlinale
- Born: Rebecca Augusta Miller; September 15, 1962 (age 64); Roxbury, Connecticut, U.S.
- Education: Yale University
- Occupations: Screenwriter, director, novelist
- Spouse: Daniel Day-Lewis (m. 1996)
- Children: 2, including Ronan Day-Lewis
- Parent(s): Arthur Miller; Inge Morath
- Relatives: Joan Copeland (aunt); Cecil Day-Lewis (father-in-law); Jill Balcon (mother-in-law)
- Writing career
- Years active: 1988–present
- Website: rebecca-miller.com

Rebecca Augusta Miller, Lady Day-Lewis (born September 15, 1962) is an American filmmaker, novelist, director, and advocate of women in the film industry. She is known for her films Angela (1995), Personal Velocity: Three Portraits (2002), The Ballad of Jack and Rose (2005), The Private Lives of Pippa Lee (2009), Maggie's Plan (2015), Arthur Miller: Writer (2017), and She Came to Me (2023), all of which she wrote and directed, as well as her novels The Private Lives of Pippa Lee and Jacob's Folly. Miller received the Sundance Film Festival's Grand Jury Prize for Personal Velocity and the Gotham Independent Film Award for Breakthrough Director for Angela. She also won an Emmy Award for the documentary series Mr. Scorsese (2025), which she produced and directed.

Miller is the daughter of Arthur Miller, a Pulitzer Prize–winning playwright, and his third wife, Inge Morath, a Magnum photographer.

== Early life and education ==
Miller was born in Roxbury, Connecticut, to Arthur Miller, the dramatist, and Austrian-born Inge Morath, a photographer. Her younger brother, Daniel, was born in 1966. Her father was Jewish, whereas her mother was Protestant. For a time during childhood, Miller practiced Catholicism of her own accord. Her maternal grandparents were Catholic converts to Protestantism. She has said that she stopped thinking of herself as a Christian "somewhere at the end of college". Miller remembered her childhood in Roxbury as being surrounded by artists. Sculptor Alexander Calder was a neighbor; so were choreographer Martha Clarke and members of the experimental dance troupe Pilobolus. Immersed in drawing, Miller was tutored by another neighbor, sculptor Philip Grausman.

Miller attended Choate Rosemary Hall. In 1980, she entered Yale University to study painting and literature. Naomi Wolf, the feminist author, was her roommate. Miller created wooden panel triptychs she described as hybrids of pictographic forms inspired, for example, by Paul Klee and a 15th-century altarpiece. Upon graduation in 1985, Miller went abroad on a fellowship, to Munich, Germany.

In 1987, Miller took up residence in New York City, and she showed painting and sculpture at Leo Castelli Gallery, Victoria Munroe Gallery, and in Connecticut. Miller also studied film at The New School. Mentored by professor Arnold S. Eagle, a photographer and cinematographer, Miller began making non-verbal films, which she exhibited along with her artwork.

== Career ==
=== 1988–1994 ===
In 1988, Miller was cast in the role of Anya in Peter Brook's adaptation of Chekhov's The Cherry Orchard, her first stage role. She originated the part of Lili in The American Plan. Throughout, Miller gravitated toward her role as an independent filmmaker/director. Miller began her acting career with directors Alan Pakula, Paul Mazursky, and Mike Nichols. She played the female lead in NBC's television movie The Murder of Mary Phagan, and supporting roles in feature films, including Regarding Henry (1991), Consenting Adults (1992), and Wind (1992).

In 1991, Miller wrote and directed a short film Florence, starring actress Marcia Gay Harden, about a precociously empathetic woman who acquires the symptoms from others; eventually "catching" a neighbor's amnesia, she forgets her own identity. Florence caught the attention of Ensemble Theatre Cincinnati, and Miller was invited to direct a revival of Arthur Miller's After the Fall. She also directed Nicole Burdette's play The Bluebird Special Came Through Here.

=== 1995–2009 ===
Miller wrote and directed her first film, Angela, in 1995. It is the story of 10-year-old Angela's attempt to purge her soul of sin in order to cure her mentally ill mother. The film premiered at Philadelphia Festival of World Cinema, and screened at Sundance Film Festival. For Angela, Miller received the Independent Feature Project's Open Palm Award, and the Sundance Film Festival Filmmaker Trophy from her peers. The film's cinematographer Ellen Kuras was also honored at Sundance and the Brussels International Festival of Fantasy Film.

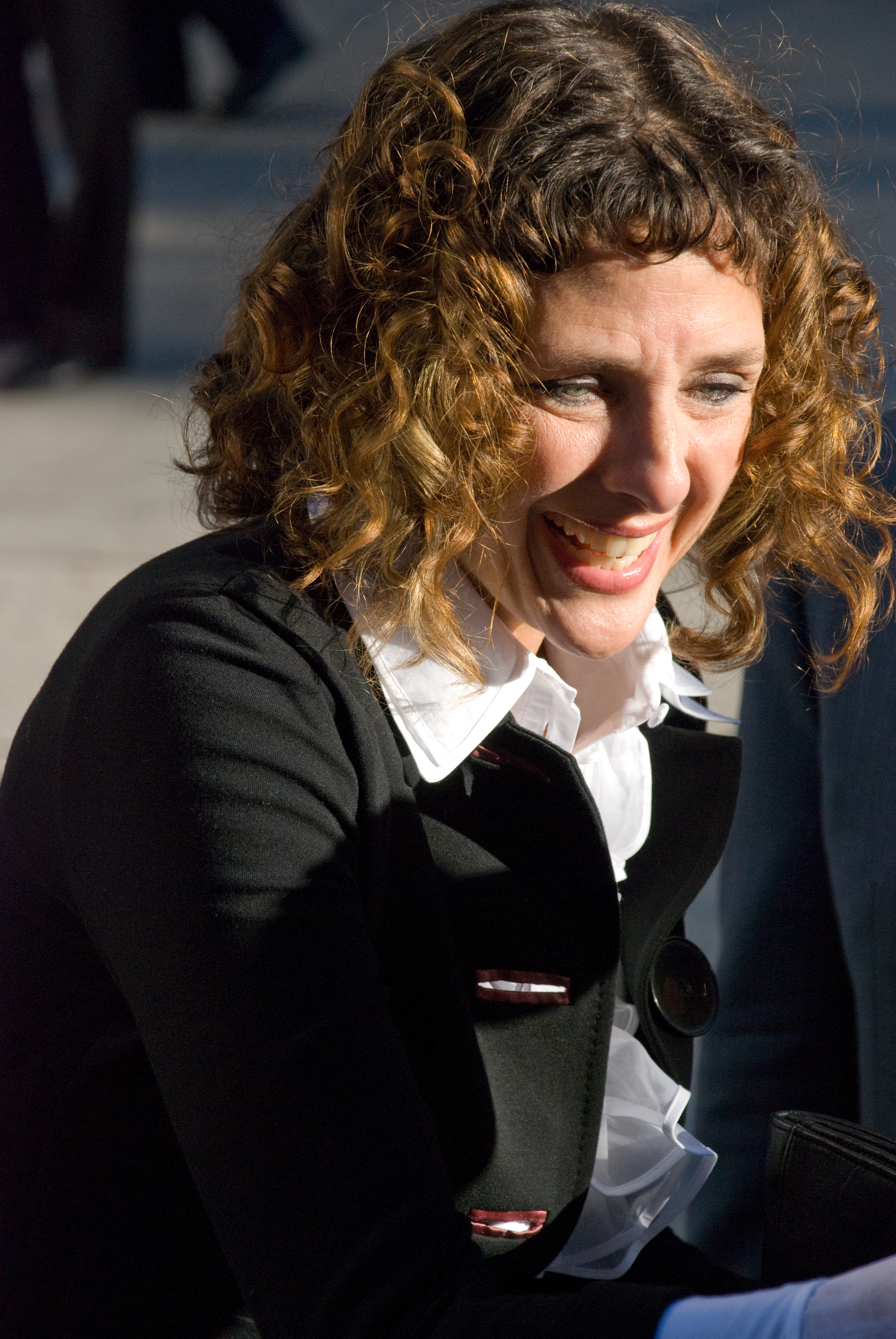
Miller at the premiere of The Private Lives of Pippa Lee at the 2009 Toronto International Film Festival

Miller's collection of prose portraits of women, Personal Velocity, was awarded The Washington Post Best Book of 2001. Personal Velocity was adapted by Miller for her 2002 award-winning feature film by the same name. She adapted three short stories into a screenplay of three different, although thematically unified short films, which Miller then directed. Each film explores personal transformation in response to life-changing circumstances. Miller credits the poet Honor Moore for help to "bridge the gap between being a writer of scripts and fiction." Personal Velocity: Three Portraits screened at Tribeca Film Festival, the High Falls Film Festival, and the film was successfully released through United Artists. The film earned critical praise from The New York Times as "the work of a talented and highly visual writer." For Personal Velocity, Miller received the Sundance Film Festival Grand Jury Prize and the Independent Spirit John Cassavetes Award in 2002, and the National Board of Review of Motion Pictures Special Recognition for Excellence in Filmmaking in 2003. Cinematographer Ellen Kuras received the Excellence in Cinematography Award at Sundance. Personal Velocity: Three Portraits is part of the permanent collection of the Museum of Modern Art in New York City.

In 2003, Miller wrote and illustrated A Woman Who. The book is a collection of images of women, in a variety of scenes, each drawn by Miller with her eyes closed. Also in 2003, she was featured in the IFC Films documentary In The Company of Women, directed by Lesli Klainberg and Gini Reticker. Miller wrote the screenplay for the 2005 film adaptation of David Auburn's Pulitzer Prize-winning play Proof. The film was directed by John Madden, and stars Gwyneth Paltrow and Anthony Hopkins. Also in 2005, Miller directed her film, The Ballad of Jack and Rose, which stars Daniel Day-Lewis, Camilla Belle and Catherine Keener. Shot on location in Nova Scotia and on Prince Edward Island, the film is a textured, sorrowful, coming of age story about a 16-year-old named Rose who has grown up in isolation with her father. The Ballad of Jack and Rose screened at the Woodstock Film Festival and IFC Center in New York. For The Ballad of Jack and Rose, Miller received Honorable Mention from MTV's 2010 The Best Female Directors Who Should Have Won An Oscar.

In 2009, Miller released her fourth film, The Private Lives of Pippa Lee, an adaptation of her 2002 novel by the same name. A nuanced exploration of a 50-year-old woman's adjustment reaction to moving into a retirement community with her 80-year-old husband, the story flows back and forth between the main character Pippa's memories of her freewheeling New York City youth in the 1970s and her present life. Miller directed a star-studded cast which includes Robin Wright, Alan Arkin, Keanu Reeves, Winona Ryder and Julianne Moore. The Private Lives of Pippa Lee premiered at Toronto International Film Festival, and screened at Ryerson University, the Berlin Film Festival, and the Hay Festival.

At the Kerry Film Festival in 2009, Miller was honored with the Maureen O'Hara Award, in recognition for her achievements in film.

=== 2013–present ===
In 2013, Miller published Jacob's Folly – a complex novel about an 18th-century French rake reincarnated as a housefly in modern-day New York with the ability to enter the other characters’ consciousness and influence them. Critic Maureen Corrigan praised the work, saying, "Miller's writing style is sensuous, and her individual stories expand, opulently, in scope and emotional impact."

Miller wrote a screenplay neo-screwball comedy called Maggie's Plan, based upon an original story by Karen Rinaldi. Miller directed the film, shot primarily in Greenwich Village, in 2015. Maggie's Plan premiered at Toronto International Film Festival Special Presentations, and screened internationally, at the New York Film Festival, Montclair Film Festival, Berlin Film Festival, Dublin International Film Festival, San Francisco International Film Festival, USA Film Festival/Angelika Film Center Dallas, Denver Film Critics Society Women+Film Festival, Miami International Film Festival, and Sundance Film Festival. Sony Pictures Classics distributed Maggie's Plan in theaters. The ensemble cast includes Greta Gerwig, Julianne Moore, Ethan Hawke, Bill Hader and Maya Rudolph. Critic for Vanity Fair, Richard Lawson praised Maggie's Plan as "A smart, goofy delight!" Maggie's Plan was released in movies theaters in 2016.

In 2023, she directed the romantic-comedy film She Came to Me. Her next project will be a biopic on Margaret Wise Brown entitled Moonsong: A Life in Seven Voices, and stars Julianne Moore and Elle Fanning.

== Personal life ==
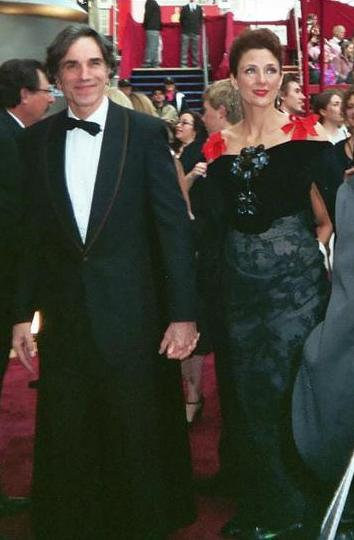
Rebecca Miller and husband Daniel Day-Lewis at the 80th Academy Awards on February 24, 2008

Miller first met her spouse, actor Daniel Day-Lewis, at a screening of the film adaptation of her father's play The Crucible. Miller and Day-Lewis married later that year, on November 13, 1996. They have two sons together, including director Ronan. Miller is stepmother to Day-Lewis's eldest son, from his previous relationship with Isabelle Adjani.

== Bibliography ==
- Personal Velocity. Grove Press, New York 2001, ISBN 9780802116994.
- A Woman Who. Bloomsbury, London 2003, ISBN 9780747565253.
- The Ballad of Jack and Rose. Faber and Faber, New York 2005, ISBN 9780571211753.
- The Private Lives of Pippa Lee. Farrar, Straus and Giroux, New York 2008, ISBN 9780374237424.
- Jacob's Folly. Farrar, Straus and Giroux, New York 2014, ISBN 9780374178543.
- Total. Farrar, Straus and Giroux, New York 2022, ISBN 9780374299118.

== Filmography ==
Film

Year	Title	Director	Writer	Producer
1995	Angela	Yes	Yes	No
2002	Personal Velocity: Three Portraits	Yes	Yes	No
2005	The Ballad of Jack and Rose	Yes	Yes	No
2005	Proof	No	Yes	No
2009	The Private Lives of Pippa Lee	Yes	Yes	No
2015	Maggie's Plan	Yes	Yes	Yes
2023	She Came to Me	Yes	Yes	Yes
2025	Pose	No	No	Yes

Documentary works

Year	Title	Director	Writer	Producer
2017	Arthur Miller: Writer	Yes	Yes	No
2025	Mr. Scorsese	Yes	No	Yes

Acting roles

Year	Title	Role	Notes
1988	The Murder of Mary Phagan	Lucille Frank	2 episodes
1989	Seven Minutes	Anneliese	
1991	Regarding Henry	Linda	
1992	Wind	Abigail Weld	
1992	Consenting Adults	Kay Otis	
1993	The Pickle	Carrie	
1993	The American Clock	Edie	TV movie
1994	Mrs. Parker and the Vicious Circle	Neysa McMein	
1994	Love Affair	Receptionist	
2017	The Meyerowitz Stories	Loretta Shapiro	

== Accolades ==
Year	Award	Category	Title	Result	Ref.
1995	Sundance Film Festival	Grand Jury Prize Dramatic	Angela	Nominated	
1995	Sundance Film Festival	Filmmakers Trophy	Angela	Won	
2002	Sundance Film Festival	Grand Jury Prize Dramatic	Personal Velocity: Three Portraits	Won	
2003	Film Independent Spirit Awards	John Cassavetes Award	Personal Velocity: Three Portraits	Won	
2005	Deauville Film Festival	Grand Special Prize	The Ballad of Jack and Rose	Nominated	
2016	Edinburgh International Film Festival	Audience Award	Maggie's Plan	Nominated	
2019	News and Documentary Emmy Awards	Outstanding Arts & Culture Documentary	Arthur Miller: Writer	Nominated	
2026	Primetime Emmy Awards	Outstanding Documentary or Nonfiction Series	Mr. Scorsese	Won	
2026	Primetime Emmy Awards	Outstanding Directing for a Documentary/Nonfiction Program	Mr. Scorsese	Nominated	
