= Songs from the Hole =

2025 documentary

- Directed by: Contessa Gayles
- Written by: James "JJ'88" Jacobs, Contessa Gayles
- Produced by: Jenny Raskin, Lauren Haber, Geralyn White Dreyfous, Regina K. Scully, Meadow Fund, Dream Hampton
- Cinematography: Michelle Kwong, Contessa Gayles
- Edited by: Contessa Gayles, Rafe Scobey-Thal, Princess A. Hairston
- Distributed by: Netflix
- Release dates: March 10, 2024 (SXSW); August 19, 2025 (location)
- Running time: 1hr 46 minutes

Songs from the Hole is a 2024 Netflix documentary.

== Plot ==
Songs From the Hole is a documentary that details the life in prison of James "JJ'88" Jacobs, a man convicted of murder as a teenager and how he became a musician while in prison.

== Reception ==
The Guardian stated that the film is "a deeply moving and unconventional documentary that weaves Jacobs’s musical visions first developed in solitary – bits of his handwritten “first drafts/treatments for the visual album” appear on screen – with more traditional narrative footage of his life and loved ones outside prison." Rolling Stone wrote, "the documentary is a strong case for the benefits of restorative justice."

== Release ==
Songs from the Hole premiered at the 2024 SXSW Film Festival where it won the Visions Audience Award at the 2024 SXSW Film Festival. It premiered on Netflix on August 13, 2025.

== Awards and recognition ==
Songs from the Hole Overall, it won 10 awards on the film festival circuit in 2024.
