= Earth, Wind & Fire (To Be Celestial vs That's the Weight of the World) =

2026 American documentary film

- Promotional release poster
- Directed by: Questlove
- Produced by: Questlove; Dave Sirulnick; Samantha Grogin; KB White; Arron Saxe
- Cinematography: Emily Topper
- Edited by: Andrew Morrow; Matt Cascella; Tim Ziegler
- Music by: Questlove; Raymond Angry
- Production companies: HBO Documentary Films; Two One Five Entertainment; Broken Halo Entertainment; RadicalMedia; Word Is Bond; Fifth Season; Sony Music Vision
- Distributed by: HBO
- Release dates: June 3, 2026 (Tribeca); June 7, 2026
- Running time: 119 minutes
- Country: United States
- Language: English

Earth, Wind & Fire (To Be Celestial vs That's the Weight of the World) is a 2026 American documentary film directed and produced by Questlove. It explores the life, career, and impact of the band Earth, Wind & Fire and its founder Maurice White.

It had its world premiere at the Tribeca Festival on June 3, 2026, and was released on June 7, 2026, by HBO Documentary Films.

== Premise ==
Explores the life, career, and impact of Earth, Wind & Fire.

== Production ==
In September 2024, it was announced Questlove would direct a documentary revolving around Earth, Wind & Fire, with Fifth Season set to finance. In October 2025, HBO Documentary Films boarded the film.

== Release ==
It had its world premiere at the Tribeca Festival on June 3, 2026. It will also screen at Sheffield DocFest on June 12, 2026, and DC/DOX Film Festival on June 13, 2026.

== Reception ==
On the review aggregator website Rotten Tomatoes, 100% of 19 critics' reviews are positive, with an average rating of 8.1/10. Metacritic, which uses a weighted average, assigned the film a score of 94 out of 100, based on six critics, indicating "universal acclaim".
