= International Media Support =

International Media Support (IMS) is an international NGO located in Copenhagen, Denmark, working to support local media in countries affected by armed conflict, human insecurity and political transition. It works in 41 countries to improve professional journalism and help media personnel to operate under difficult circumstances. The group works to promote freedom of expression and freedom of the press, in order to reduce conflict, strengthen democracy and bring about dialogue.

== History ==
IMS was established in 2001 in the wake of violence and killings in Rwanda and the former Yugoslavia. In the 1990s, IMS members believe these and other conflicts saw media being manipulated and used as a tool to fuel violent conflict. IMS was set up in response, with an aim to helping local media working in conflict-affected areas to remain operative and professional. The group works in partnership with local media and media support organisations, nationally and internationally, to identify and react rapidly and flexibly to the needs of local media. This can include help with media laws and media reforms, skills training, technical support and the protection of journalists. The group advocates media rights and monitors for violations, supporting community, exiled and alternative media, and works with media professionals within and across borders to promote knowledge exchange and cooperation.

The group aims to undertake its work through cooperation and collaboration, seeking to encourage maximum coordination with existing local and international initiatives.

Various examples of IMS's work have been reported by other news organisations. In 2021 The Guardian interviewed an Afghan female journalist who had been targeted by the Taliban in her home province and was now living in a safe house established by IMS in Kabul.
