= Katrina: Come Hell and High Water =

2025 American TV documentary series

- Genre: Documentary
- Directed by: Geeta Gandbhir; Samantha Knowles; Spike Lee
- Music by: Terence Blanchard
- Country of origin: United States
- Original language: English

Production
- Executive producers: Spike Lee; Geeta Gandbhir; Sam Pollard
- Producer: Alisa Payne
- Production companies: 40 Acres and a Mule Filmworks; Message Pictures

Original release
- Network: Netflix
- Release: August 27, 2025

Katrina: Come Hell and High Water is a 2025 documentary series directed by Geeta Gandbhir, Samantha Knowles and Spike Lee. It explores Hurricane Katrina and its impact twenty years later.

It premiered on August 27, 2025, on Netflix.

== Premise ==
Explores Hurricane Katrina from the perspective of those who survived the storm, how their life changed as a result, and the impact of the storm twenty years later.

== Episodes ==
No.	Title	Directed by	Original release date
1	"We Gonna Ride It Out Like We Always Do"	Geeta Gandbhir	August 27, 2025
2	"Shelter of Last Resort"	Samantha Knowles	August 27, 2025
3	"God Takes Care of Fools and Babies"	Spike Lee	August 27, 2025

== Production ==
In January 2025, it was announced Geeta Gandbhir, Samantha Knowles and Spike Lee had directed a documentary series revolving around Hurricane Katrina, with Netflix set to distribute.
