= American Doctor =

2026 documentary film by Poh Si Teng

- Theatrical release poster
- Directed by: Poh Si Teng
- Produced by: Poh Si Teng; Kirstine Barfod; Reem Haddad
- Cinematography: Ibrahim Al Otla; Chris Renteria
- Edited by: Christopher White; Ema Ryan Yamazaki
- Music by: Suad Bushnaq
- Production company: Tiny Boxer Films
- Distributed by: Watermelon Pictures
- Release dates: January 23, 2026 (Sundance); August 14, 2026 (United States)
- Running time: 93 minutes
- Countries: United States; State of Palestine; Malaysia; Qatar
- Languages: English; Arabic
- Box office: $1 million

American Doctor is a 2026 documentary film directed by Poh Si Teng. The film follows three American physicians of diverse backgrounds who travel to Gaza to provide medical aid during the conflict.

It premiered in the U.S. Documentary Competition at the 2026 Sundance Film Festival on January 23, 2026, and was released in the United States on August 14, 2026, by Watermelon Pictures.

== Premise ==
The film follows three American physicians of different backgrounds. Dr. Mark Perlmutter is a Jewish American orthopedic surgeon from North Carolina; Dr. Thaer Ahmad is a Palestinian American emergency physician from Chicago; and Dr. Feroze Sidhwa is a trauma surgeon from California of Pakistani Parsi heritage. The three doctors operated primarily out of Nasser Hospital in Khan Younis during two visits to Gaza, before and after the 2025 ceasefire.

In an opening scene, Perlmutter demands that Teng show an unblurred photograph of babies killed in a missile strike, arguing that blurring the images would obscure the reality of events. The film documents the doctors' work in operating rooms and hospital corridors, their media appearances upon returning to the United States, and the death threats some received as a result of their public advocacy. The film also documents the particular difficulty Ahmad faced gaining entry to Gaza due to his Palestinian heritage, despite holding the same American credentials as his colleagues.

== Production ==
Poh Si Teng is a Malaysia-born, New York-based journalist and filmmaker. She previously worked as a documentary commissioner for Al Jazeera English, a grants director at the International Documentary Association, and a journalist for the New York Times and ABC News. She produced St. Louis Superman and Patrice: The Movie.

Teng described her decision to make the film as personal desperation. "A year into the genocide, I didn't have any more words. I was very angry. And then came despair," she said at CPH:DOX in March 2026. She quit her job as a creative executive at ABC and spent approximately $150,000 of her personal savings to begin production, later raising nearly $200,000 in donations during fundraising trips to Malaysia. Production ran from December 2024 to December 2025. This film marks her feature directorial debut.

The film's two Gaza-based cinematographers, Ibrahim Al Otla and Christopher Renteria, filmed embedded with the doctors while themselves facing food shortages and the threat of bombardment. They uploaded footage daily via a balcony at Nasser Hospital that was later destroyed in an Israeli strike that killed 22 people including journalists and medical workers.

The production team includes producers Kirstine Barfod (known for The Cave) and Reem Haddad, with executive producers Simon Kilmurry and Hamza Ali. The film features music by composer Suad Bushnaq.

After midnight on the night of 11 November 2026, Dr Rizq Abu Shaeera (Arabic: رزق أبو شعيرة), a Palestinian doctor who appeared in the film, was killed by an Israeli airstrike on Nasser Hospital.

== Release ==
American Doctor had its world premiere in the U.S. Documentary Competition section at the 2026 Sundance Film Festival on January 23, 2026. It also screened at the 2026 South by Southwest Film & TV Festival, Thessaloniki International Documentary Festival, True/False Film Festival, CPH:DOX, and the Hot Docs Canadian International Documentary Festival, where it won the Audience Award. In April 2026, Watermelon Pictures acquired distribution rights to the film. It was released in the United States on August 14, 2026.

== Reception ==
On the review aggregator website Rotten Tomatoes, 100% of 51 critics' reviews are positive, with an average rating of 8.6/10. The website's consensus reads: "American Doctor bears visceral witness to the crisis in Gaza, transforming the grim realities of the operating room into an urgent portrait of humanitarian resolve." Metacritic, which uses a weighted average, assigned the film a score of 86 out of 100, based on 12 critics, indicating "universal acclaim".

Variety called the film's thesis "sharpest when depicting Perlmutter," praising Teng for revealing "the inherent inequality in whose stories get told, and who's allowed to be angry, indignant and morally correct." RogerEbert.com found it "a formidable debut, an unflinching view of a story we've heard about but might not fully understand," noting minor first-film issues including occasional intrusive music. Collider gave the film a 9/10, naming it as "one of the most important documentaries to come out of Sundance."

The Council on American-Islamic Relations called on streaming platforms worldwide to distribute the film, naming its subjects as "three heroic Americans" who show "the reality of Israel's genocide in Gaza."

=== Accolades ===
Award	Date of ceremony	Category	Recipient(s)	Result	Ref.
Sundance Film Festival	February 1, 2026	Grand Jury Prize – U.S. Documentary Competition	American Doctor	Nominated	
Critics' Choice Documentary Awards	November 8, 2026	Best First Documentary Feature	Poh Si Teng	Nominated	
Critics' Choice Documentary Awards	November 8, 2026	Best Political Documentary	American Doctor	Nominated	
Cinema Eye Honors	January 11, 2027	Outstanding Achievement in Nonfiction Feature Filmmaking	Poh Si Teng, Kirstine Barfod, Reem Haddad, Chris Rentaria, Ibrahim Al Otla, Ramzy Haddad, Christopher White, Ema Ryan Yamazaki, Suad Bushnaq, Kristian Selin Eidnes Andersen, Patrick Svaneberg Vejen, Jacob Langkjær Davidsen, Dr. Thaer Ahmad, Dr. Mark Perlmutter, and Dr. Feroze Sidhwa	Pending	
Cinema Eye Honors	January 11, 2027	Audience Choice Prize	American Doctor	Pending	
Cinema Eye Honors	January 11, 2027	Outstanding Achievement in Direction	Poh Si Teng	Pending	
Cinema Eye Honors	January 11, 2027	Outstanding Achievement in Debut Feature Filmmaking	Poh Si Teng	Pending	
Cinema Eye Honors	January 11, 2027	Outstanding Achievement in Production	Poh Si Teng, Kirstine Barfod and Reem Haddad	Pending	
Cinema Eye Honors	January 11, 2027	Outstanding Achievement in Original Music Score	Suad Bushnaq	Pending	
Cinema Eye Honors	January 11, 2027	The Unforgettables	Dr. Thaer Ahmad, Dr. Mark Perlmutter, and Dr. Feroze Sidhwa	Won	

== See also ==
- NAZA (film)
- 2025 Nasser Hospital strikes
- November 2026 airstrike on Nasser Hospital
