= Matasila Freshwater =

Matasila Freshwater is a New Zealand illustrator, writer and director. She was awarded a 2020 Springboard Award, and a 2021 Sun & Moon Jury Prize.

== Life ==
Matasila Freshwater is from the Solomon Islands. She studied anthropology, animation and illustration.

She lives in Wellington. In 2019, she directed the film on the Solomon Islands, Vai. Vai was screened at the 2019 Vancouver International Film Festival, imagineNATIVE Film and Media Arts Festival, and Berlin Film Festival.

== Filmography ==
- Shmeat, 2016, animated film
- Vai, 2019
- Hiama, 2021
- Teine Sā, 2021
- Sukindimi Walks Before Me, 2026
