= Patrice: The Movie =

2024 documentary film

Patrice: The Movie is a 2024 documentary film by director Ted Passon which details the relationship of Patrice Jetter and Garry Wickham, two American people with disabilities who would like to get engaged but cannot due to the likelihood that they would lose some or all of their Supplemental Security Income (SSI) and health insurance due to the "marriage penalty."

The film won the Exceptional Merit In Documentary Filmmaking at the 77th Primetime Creative Arts Emmy Awards.
