= Impact Partners =

American media production company

- Industry: Film industry
- Founder: Dan Cogan; Geralyn Dreyfous
- Key people: Dan Cogan; Geralyn Dreyfous; Jenny Raskin; Amy Augustino; Kelsey Koening
- Website: impactpartnersfilm.com

Impact Partners is an American film production and television production company founded in 2007, by Dan Cogan and Geralyn Dreyfous. The company primarily produces documentary films focusing on social issues.

They have produced such films as The Queen of Versailles (2012), How to Survive a Plague (2012), The Hunting Ground (2015), Icarus, which won the Academy Award for Best Documentary Feature, Of Fathers and Sons (2017), Won't You Be My Neighbor (2018), and On the Record (2020).

== History ==
In 2007, Dan Cogan and Geralyn Dreyfous founded the company, focusing on financing and producing documentary film and television projects, focusing on social issues.

The company has produced films which have gone on to receive critical acclaim and awards, including Freeheld (2007), which won Academy Award for Best Documentary (Short Subject), The Hunting Ground (2015), which was nominated for Primetime Emmy Award for Exceptional Merit in Documentary Filmmaking, Icarus (2017), which won the Academy Award for Best Documentary Feature, Of Fathers and Sons (2017), which was nominated for Best Documentary Feature, Divide and Conquer: The Story of Roger Ailes (2018), nominated for the Primetime Emmy Award for Exceptional Merit in Documentary Filmmaking, and The Apollo which won the Primetime Emmy for Exceptional Merit in Documentary Filmmaking.

Apart from films, the company has produced television shows including Immigration Nation for Netflix, Allen v. Farrow for HBO, and The Lincoln Project for Showtime.

In 2018, the company announced it would support the development of 4-8 non-fiction projects a year, ranging between $10k-100k. In January 2020, Jenny Raskin was named executive director of the company.

== Filmography ==
=== Films ===
Title	Year	Distributor
2007	Freeheld	Cinemax
2010	The End of America	IndiePix Films
2012	The Queen of Versailles	Magnolia Pictures
2012	How to Survive a Plague	Sundance Selects
2013	Web Junkie	Dogwoof
2013	Anita: Speaking Truth to Power	Samuel Goldwyn Films
2014	Meet the Patels	Alchemy
2014	Do I Sound Gay?	Sundance Selects
2015	The Hunting Ground	Radius-TWC
2016	Audrie & Daisy	Netflix
2016	Notes on Blindness	Artificial Eye
2016	City of Joy	Netflix
2017	Icarus	Netflix
2017	Step	Searchlight Pictures
2017	Bending the Arc	Abramorama
2017	Nobody Speak: Trials of the Free Press	Netflix
2017	Of Fathers and Sons	Kino Lorber
2017	Voyeur	Netflix
2018	Won't You Be My Neighbor?	Focus Features
2018	Bathtubs Over Broadway	Focus World
2018	Divide and Conquer: The Story of Roger Ailes	Magnolia Pictures
2019	Shooting the Mafia	Cohen Media Group
2019	The Apollo	HBO Documentary Films
2019	The Kingmaker	Greenwich Entertainment; Showtime Documentary Films
2020	Us Kids	Greenwich Entertainment
2020	On the Record	HBO Max
2020	Spaceship Earth	Neon
2020	Giving Voice	Netflix
2020	Athlete A	Netflix
2020	Television Event	N/A
2021	Ailey	Neon
2021	Dear Mr. Brody	Greenwich Entertainment; Discovery+
2021	Fathom	Apple TV
2021	Procession	Netflix
2021	Found	Netflix
2022	32 Sounds	Abramorama
2022	To the End	Roadside Attractions
2022	Aftershock	ABC News Studios; Onyx Collective; Hulu
2022	Mija	Disney+
2022	The Return of Tanya Tucker: Featuring Brandi Carlile	Sony Pictures Classics
2022	The Grab	Magnolia Pictures; Participant
2023	'It's Only Life After All	Oscilloscope Laboratories
2023	Another Body	Willa; Utopia
2023	Going Varsity in Mariachi	Netflix
2023	Confessions of a Good Samaritan	Sandbox Films
2023	Breaking the News	Independent Lens
2024	Union	Level Ground Productions
2024	Gaucho Gaucho	Jolt
2024	Eternal You	Film Movement
2024	Sugarcane	National Geographic Documentary Films
2024	Antidote	Frontline
2024	Apocalypse in the Tropics	Netflix
2024	Mistress Dispeller	Oscilloscope Laboratories
2024	Homegrown	Kinema
2024	The Shepherd and the Bear	Willa
2025	Marlee Matlin: Not Alone Anymore	Kino Lorber; American Masters
2025	Move Ya Body: The Birth of House	
2025	Baby Doe	Fourth Act Film; Persimmon
2025	We Are Pat	Tribeca Films
2025	Ask E. Jean	Abramorama
2025	Remake	Music Box Films
2026	Seized	HBO Documentary Films
2026	One in a Million	PBS Distribution
2026	The Illusion of an Everlasting Summer	Mubi
2026	Edward Said: Between Worlds	Kino Lorber
2026	Rapinoe	HBO Documentary Films

=== Television ===
Title	Year	Network
2020	Immigration Nation	Netflix
2021	Allen v. Farrow	HBO
2021	Nuclear Family	HBO
2022	The Lincoln Project	Showtime
