= Jeff Fager =

American television producer (born 1954)

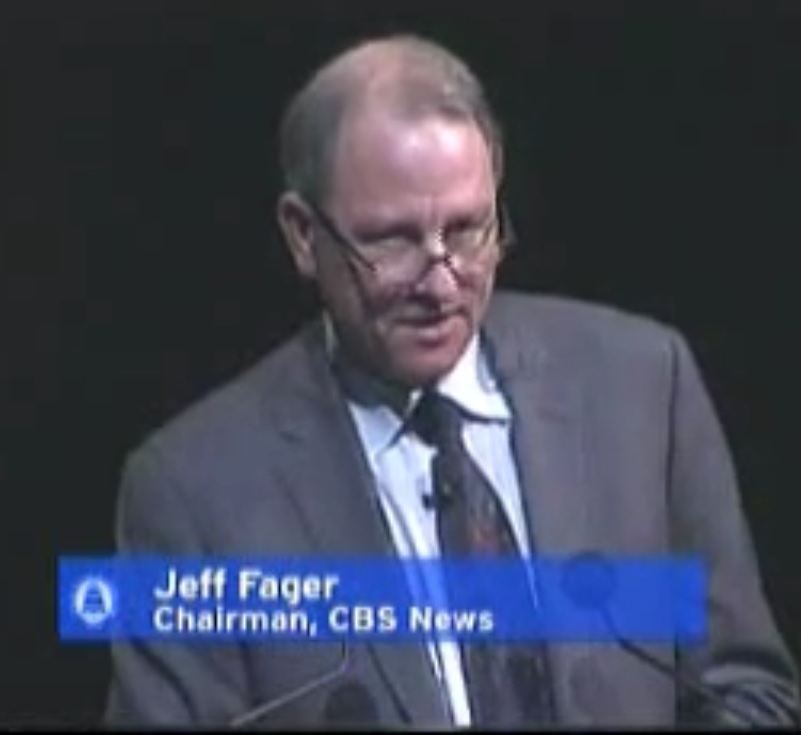
- Born: Jeffrey B. Fager; December 10, 1954 (age 71); Wellesley, Massachusetts, U.S.
- Education: Colgate University
- Occupation: Television producer
- Known for: CBS News, 60 Minutes
- Spouse: Melinda Wooster
- Children: 3
- Parents: Margaret Bulkley Fager; Charles Anthony Fager

Jeffrey B. Fager (born December 10, 1954) is an American television producer who is the former chairman of CBS News and former executive producer of 60 Minutes.

== Biography ==
Fager was born in Wellesley, Massachusetts, to an Episcopalian family, the son of Margaret (née Bulkley) and Charles Anthony Fager. He graduated from Colgate University in 1977.

== Career ==
He began his career in broadcast news as a production assistant in Boston, in 1977, then joined CBS News in San Francisco, California, in 1982, at affiliate KPIX-TV. From 1983–1988, Fager was a producer on CBS Evening News, while based in London and New York, then became a producer at 60 Minutes in 1989, and was then on the team that created primetime CBS News magazine 48 Hours. He became the senior broadcast producer for the CBS Evening News in 1994, then its executive producer, in 1996, departing the role in 1998 to become the first executive producer of 60 Minutes II. In June 2004, he assumed the position of executive producer of 60 Minutes.

In February 2011, it was announced that Fager would lead the news division of CBS as chairman of CBS News, a newly created position. In tandem with the newly appointed president, David Rhodes, Fager would head CBS News while continuing to executive produce 60 Minutes. After stepping in as chairman of CBS News, Fager said he would "restore CBS News to where it should be, where it needs to be", using the original reporting and storytelling of 60 Minutes as a benchmark for its other news programs. On January 1, 2015, Fager stepped down as chairman but continued in his executive producer role at 60 Minutes until his 2018 departure from CBS News more generally. David Rhodes continued to serve as President of the CBS News Division.

Fager's book, 50 Years of 60 Minutes: The Inside Story of Television's Most Influential Broadcast, was published by Simon & Schuster in 2017. The Washington Post then noted that, while it "does not take us backstairs" of the program, "the book will illuminate the broad contribution of 60 Minutes and underscore the power of smart, compelling storytelling", and that "Many of Fager's examples are worthy of historians' study."

In 2018, 19 existing and former CBS employees told The New Yorker that Fager allowed harassment within the news division. Six former employees also told the magazine that, while inebriated at company parties, he touched employees in ways that made them uncomfortable. Fager was ousted from CBS News on September 12, 2018. CBS News reported that Fager had sent a text message warning Jericka Duncan, one of the network's correspondents, when she sought his response to the report in The New Yorker: "Be careful, There are people who lost their jobs trying to harm me, and if you pass on these damaging claims without your own reporting to back them up, that will become a serious problem." Law firms Debevoise & Plimpton and Covington & Burling were engaged to investigate, reporting, in December 2018, that Fager had been sensitive and supportive of working women, and a "stark contrast" to show creator Don Hewitt.

Fager, who is noted for successfully enforcing 60 Minutes independence from CBS control, including letting staff make editorial decisions without corporate influence, was interviewed among several industry veterans, in July 2025, about the unprecedented Paramount settlement for subsidiary CBS made with Donald Trump, which had been preceded by the abrupt resignation of long-time 60 Minutes producer Bill Owens. Fager said of the deal, "it's a shame, and it’s a mistake", and expressed concern for the future oversight of his former program. That October, when interviewed by Lachlan Cartwright for Breaker Media, Fager further stated that it was another "mistake" for newly-installed CBS News editor-in-chief Bari Weiss to report directly to the new Paramount Skydance CEO David Ellison, a structure he described as "really unusual." In the wake of Scott Pelley's June 2026 firing by Weiss, Fager told the Associated Press that 60 Minutes was "hobbled without him" because Pelley's "is the most remarkable body of work in the history of the broadcast".

== Awards ==
- 2007: Gerald Loeb Award for Television Enterprise business journalism for "The Mother of All Heists"
- 2012: Paul White Award, Radio Television Digital News Association
- 2014: Gerald Loeb Award for Personal Finance business journalism for 60 Minutes: "40 Million Mistakes"

== Personal life ==
Fager is married to Melinda Wooster; they live in New Canaan, Connecticut, with their three children.

Business positions
| Preceded by Sean McManus | CBS News President; 2011-2015 | Succeeded by David Rhodes |
