= Karim Amer =

Egyptian-American film producer and director

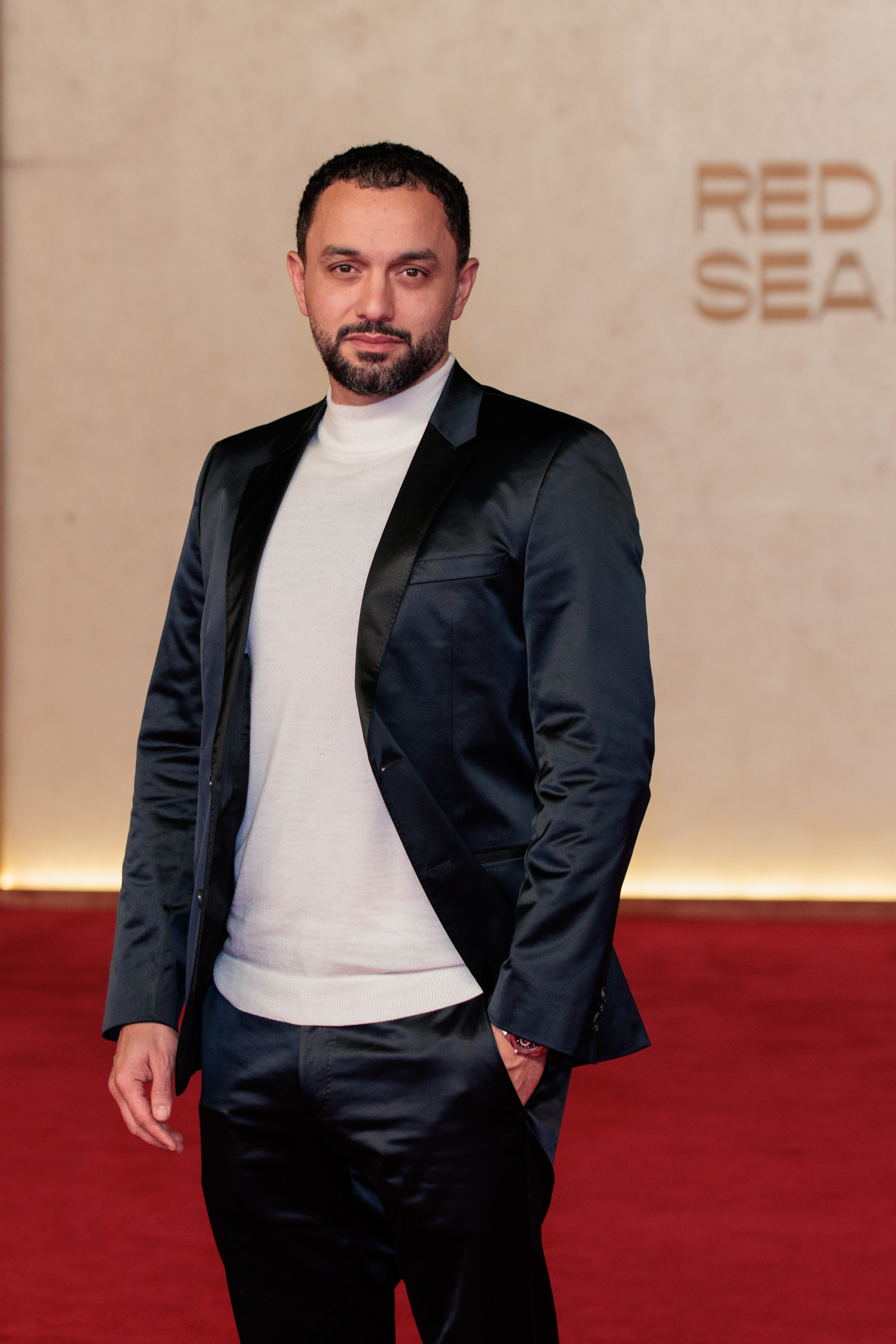
- Born: 10 November 1983 (age 42); Egypt
- Education: New York University
- Occupations: Director; producer
- Years active: 2011–present
- Spouse: Jehane Noujaim

Karim Amer (born November 10, 1983) is an Egyptian-American film producer and director. He worked on The Square (2013) and The Great Hack (2019); the former was the first Egyptian film to earn an Academy Award nomination and went on to win three Emmy Awards, while the latter got nominated for an Emmy and a BAFTA Award. In 2020, he produced and directed The Vow, an HBO documentary series about the self-improvement group, NXIVM. In 2022, he produced and directed Flight/Risk for Amazon Studios, revolving around whistleblowers at Boeing.

== Life and work ==
Amer and filmmaking partner Jehane Noujaim met whilst she was filming The Square, which he went on to co-produce with her. That film is about the Egyptian Crisis up until 2013, starting with the Egyptian revolution of 2011 at Tahrir Square. The film went on to win the Audience Award at the Sundance Film Festival and the Toronto Film Festival. It ultimately won three Emmy Awards and was the first Egyptian film to get nominated for an Academy Award.

Initially, Amer and Noujaim meant out to make a documentary revolving around the Sony Pictures hack, however the film evolved and shifted course as they started looking at how people's minds have been hacked and changed, which led to The Great Hack about the Facebook-Cambridge Analytica data scandal. The film premiered at Sundance Film Festival and went on to get nominated at the BAFTA and Emmy Awards, and won an award at the Cinema Eye Honors. Additionally, Amer developed Persuasion Machines, a project exploring virtual reality at the Sundance Film Festival

In 2017, Amer teamed up with Angelina Jolie to produce Academy Award-nominated film The Breadwinner. In 2019, Amer also produced the Golden Globe-winning series Ramy on Hulu. The series went on to gain critical acclaim and was described as "an insightful and hilarious glimpse into the life of a Muslim American family." In the same year, Amer was an executive producer on the 2019 HBO documentary film Revolution Rent, which follows Andy Señor Jr. to Cuba as he stages a production of Jonathan Larson’s Rent, which marked the first American company of a Broadway musical there in more than half a century.

Amer directed the first season of The Vow, a documentary series revolving around NXIVM and its leader Keith Raniere for HBO. The Washington Post, Entertainment Weekly, and The Los Angeles Times listed The Vow as one of the best series of 2020.

In 2021, Amer produced the narrative film You Resemble Me, which premiered at the Venice Film Festival. The film was written and directed by his sister, Dina Amer. It won the Audience Award at the Red Sea International Film Festival. It also won an unprecedented four awards at REC Tarragona, including the CineClub Jury Prize, the Young Jury Prize and the Audience Award.

In 2022, Amer directed alongside Fisher Stevens, The Lincoln Project focusing on the scandal-ridden organization of the same name for Showtime.

In 2023, Amer directed and produced Defiant revolving around the Russian invasion of Ukraine, focusing on Dmytro Kuleba and others fighting Disinformation in the Russian invasion of Ukraine, which had its world premiere at the 2023 Toronto International Film Festival in September 2023.

In 2024, Amer directed the short film The Fake Mayor focusing on the effect of deepfakes in democracies, primarily focusing on an attack on Sadiq Khan for Zeteo. In 2025, Amer served as a producer on All That's Left of You directed by Cherien Dabis, which had its world premiere at the 2025 Sundance Film Festival. In 2026, Amer served as an executive producer on The Man Will Burn directed by Noujaim and Vikram Gandhi for HBO.

Amer and Noujaim are developing a TV series "aimed at challenging perceptions of the Arab world as portrayed by such shows as Homeland and Tyrant". In addition to his 2022 Amazon Prime Video documentary Flight/Risk, Amer is set to produce a limited series also about Boeing’s controversial 737 Max planes. The untitled project, which is now in early development at Amazon Studios, hails from Oscar-winning screenwriter Chris Terrio and is expected to star Jeremy Strong, who will headline and executive produce as well.

== Filmography ==
=== Films ===
| Year | Title | Director | Producer |
|---|---|---|---|
| 2012 | Rafea: Solar Mama | No | Co-producer |
| 2013 | The Square | No | Yes |
| 2017 | The Breadwinner | No | Yes |
| 2019 | The Great Hack | Yes | Yes |
| 2019 | Revolution Rent | No | Executive |
| 2021 | You Resemble Me | No | Yes |
| 2022 | Flight/Risk | Yes | Yes |
| 2023 | Handle with Extreme Care | No | Yes |
| 2023 | Defiant | Yes | Yes |
| 2025 | All That's Left of You | No | Yes |

=== Television ===
| Year(s) | Title | Director | Producer |
|---|---|---|---|
| 2019 | Ramy | No | Co-executive producer |
| 2020-22 | The Vow | Yes | Executive |
| 2022 | The Lincoln Project | Yes | Executive |
| 2026 | The Man Will Burn | No | Executive |

== Awards and nominations ==
Awards
| Year | Award | Result |
|---|---|---|
| 2013 | Sundance Film Festival - Audience Award for The Square | Won |
| 2013 | Toronto Film Festival - Audience Award for The Square | Won |
| 2013 | International Documentary Association - Best Feature for The Square | Won |
| 2013 | International Documentary Association - Humanitas Award for The Square | Nominated |
| 2013 | Dubai International Film Festival - Best Documentary Film for The Square | Won |
| 2014 | Academy Awards - Best Documentary Feature for The Square | Nominated |
| 2014 | Film Independent Spirit Awards - Best Documentary for The Square | Nominated |
| 2014 | Cinema Eye Honors - Outstanding Achievement in Production for The Square | Nominated |
| 2014 | Primetime Emmy Awards - Outstanding Documentary or Nonfiction Special for The Square | Won |
| 2018 | Academy Awards - Best Animated Feature for The Breadwinner | Nominated |
| 2019 | International Documentary Association - Creative Recognition Award: Best Writing for The Great Hack | Won |
| 2020 | BAFTA Awards - Best Documentary for The Great Hack | Nominated |
| 2020 | Primetime Emmy Awards - Best Documentary or Nonfiction Special for The Great Hack | Nominated |
| 2022 | Kerala International Film Festival - Golden Crow Pheasant for You Resemble Me | Nominated |
