= Omar Mullick =

American film director

- Occupation(s): Film director, producer, screenwriter, cinematographer
- Years active: 2012–present

Omar Mullick is an American film director, screenwriter, cinematographer and producer. He has directed and served as cinematographer on These Birds Walk (2013), The Vow (2020), and Flight/Risk (2022).

== Career ==
In 2013, Mullick co-directed alongside Bassam Tariq, These Birds Walk a documentary revolving around a boy and ambulance driver in Karachi. It had its world premiere at the True/False Film Festival in March 2013, It was released in November 2013, by Oscilloscope.

In 2020, Mullick directed an episode and served as cinematographer on The Vow a documentary series revolving around NXIVM for HBO. In 2021, Mullick served as screenwriter and cinematographer on You Resemble Me directed by Dina Amer. That same year, Mullick produced the documentary short Three Songs for Benazir which was acquired by Netflix, and nominated for an Academy Award. In 2022, Mullick co-directed with Karim Amer and served as cinematographer on Flight/Risk, a documentary revolving around whistleblowers at Boeing for Amazon Studios.
