= Found (2021 film) =

2021 documentary film

- Official poster
- Directed by: Amanda Lipitz
- Produced by: Amanda Lipitz; Anita Gou; Jane Zheng; Jenny Raskin; Jamie Schutz
- Cinematography: Casey Regan
- Edited by: Penelope Falk
- Music by: Toby Chu
- Production companies: Amanda Lipitz Productions; Impact Partners; Kindred Spirit; Artemis Rising Foundation; Stick Figure Productions; Seesaw Productions
- Distributed by: Netflix
- Release dates: October 9, 2021 (Hamptons); October 20, 2021
- Running time: 98 minutes
- Countries: United States; China
- Languages: English; Cantonese

Found is a 2021 documentary film directed and produced by Amanda Lipitz. An international co-production of the United States and China, it follows three adopted teenage girls who discover they are blood-related cousins on 23andMe and travel to China seeking answers about their identity and family history.

Found had its world premiere at the Hamptons International Film Festival on October 9, 2021. It was released on October 20, 2021, by Netflix, and received critical acclaim for its emotional poignancy.

== Subjects ==
The film centers around three blood-related cousins born in China and adopted by American families:

- Chloe Lipitz, a 13-year-old girl adopted by a Jewish family living in Seattle and later Phoenix
- Sadie Mangelsdorf, a 14-year-old girl adopted by a Christian family with divorced parents in Nashville
- Lily Bolka, a 17-year-old girl adopted by a large Catholic family in Oklahoma City

== Synopsis ==
The film follows three adopted teenage girls who discover they are blood-related cousins through the DNA testing service 23andMe. After connecting with each other virtually, they meet up with each other and with genealogist Liu Hao from the company My China Roots to travel to China seeking answers about their identity and family history. They visit the sites where their parents left them, the orphanages where they stayed, and possible parents who gave up their children for adoption. Throughout, they and others wrestle with questions of identity and the implications of the one-child policy. None of the parents ultimately match with them, but in the closing moments of the film one of the possible parents matches with another girl.

== Production ==
The director, Amanda Lipitz, is Chloe's aunt. Found is her second major documentary, following 2017's Step. She traveled to China three times over the course of the production, the final journey with the girls. The documentary was filmed in the cinéma vérité style; Lipitz stated that respecting the girls' emotional well-being during production was a central concern. Shooting was completed just before the onset of the COVID-19 pandemic.

== Release ==
In August 2021, Netflix announced it had acquired distribution rights to the film. It had its world premiere at the Hamptons International Film Festival on October 9, 2021. It was released on October 20, 2021. The three girls reported that they were overwhelmed with correspondences from other adoptees around the world after the release.

== Critical reception ==
The film received critical acclaim and was widely praised for its emotional poignancy. On the review aggregator website Rotten Tomatoes, 100% of 15 critics' reviews are positive, with an average rating of 8.0/10. Metacritic, which uses a weighted average, assigned the film a score of 82 out of 100, based on 6 critics, indicating "universal acclaim".

Reviewing for The New York Times, Lisa Kennedy wrote that the film is "rife with poignant moments" and praised the "three beautifully complex" depictions of its subjects. John Anderson in The Wall Street Journal praised Lipitz's sensitivity to the painful aspects of the story but wrote that its narrow focus left him with some questions. Nina Metz in the Chicago Tribune called the film "deeply moving" and wrote that she was "drawn in by the conflicting feelings colliding at all once: Mutual grief and joy, but also confusion." In the Los Angeles Times, Katie Walsh wrote that "Lipitz demonstrates a deep empathy and interest in the inner lives of teenage girls", concluding that it makes a power argument for a unique kind of familial love among adoptees. Angie Han in The Hollywood Reporter wrote that the film "goes out of its way to consider the situation from all angles, and what might look from the outside like a simple story spills over with complicated emotions once it’s been cracked open." She also praised its "unfussy, unhurried approach to the story that prioritizes immediate lived experience over detached analysis or splashy reveals", its ability to "[feel] intimate but not exploitative", and its "comfort with ambivalence and ambiguity". In TheWrap, Ronda Racha Penrice wrote that "'Found' is told with such genuine love that it’s frequently hard to hold back tears."
