= Pinky promise (disambiguation) =

A pinky promise is a gesture involving the interlocking of the pinkies of two people to signify that a promise has been made.

Pinky promise may also refer to:

- Pinky Promise (company), an American film production company
- "Pinky Promise", the 2019 debut single by @onefive from 1518
