= Jehane Noujaim =

American film director (born 1974)

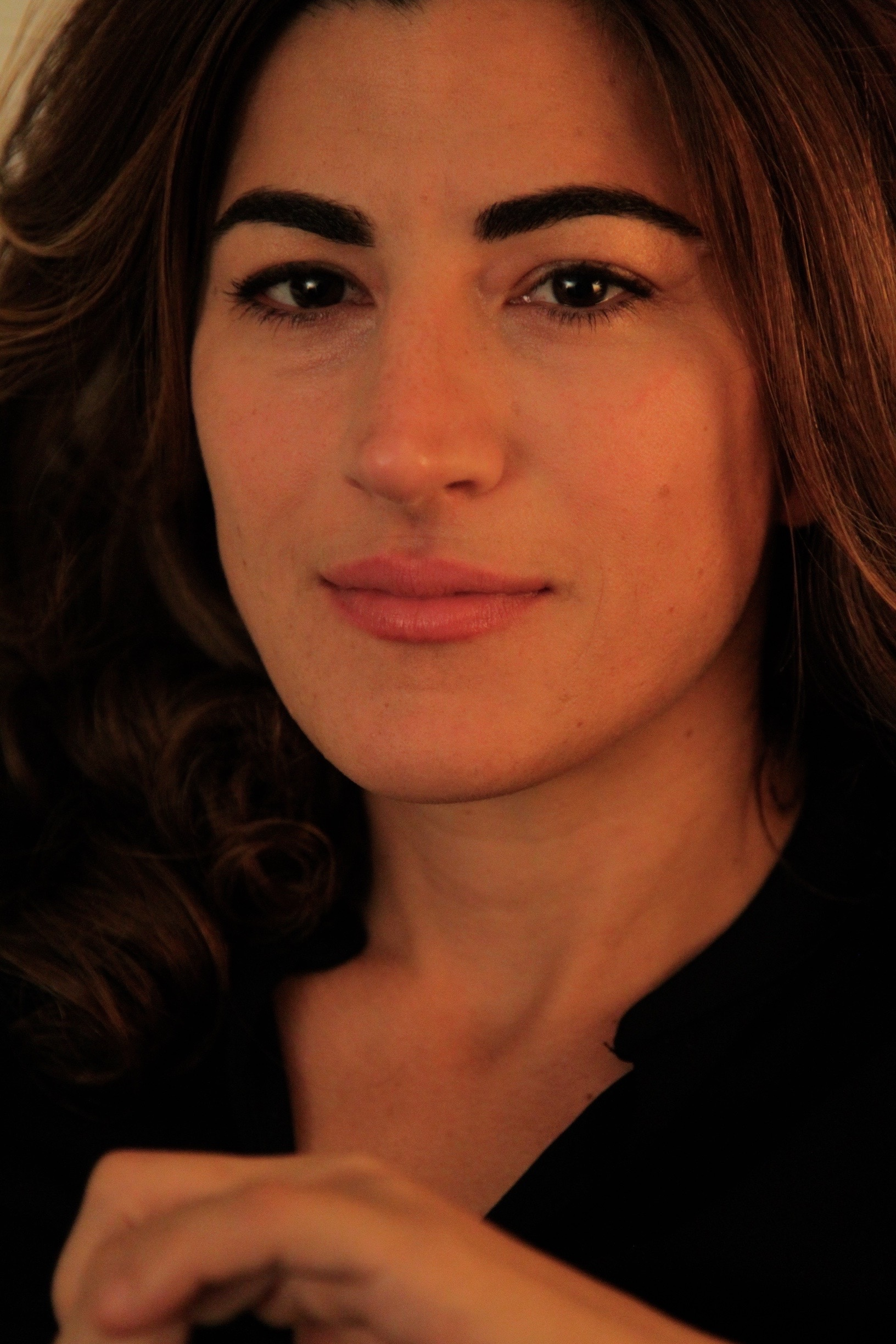
- Born: 17 May 1974 (age 52); Washington, D.C.
- Education: Harvard University
- Occupation: Documentary film director
- Years active: 1996–present
- Spouse: Karim Amer

Jehane Noujaim (Arabic: جيهان نجيم, IPA: [ʒeˈhæːn nʊˈʒeːm]) (born May 17, 1974) is an American documentary film director best known for her films Control Room, Startup.com, Pangea Day and The Square. She has co-directed The Great Hack and The Vow with Karim Amer.

== Background ==
Noujaim was born to an Egyptian-Syrian-Lebanese father and an American mother who was born in Connecticut. She was raised in Kuwait and Cairo and moved to Boston by the age of 10, in 1984. She attended Milton Academy.

In 1992, Noujaim matriculated to Harvard University, where she initially intended to study medicine. She later switched to visual arts and philosophy after taking an interest in photography and filmmaking, graduating magna cum laude in 1996.

== Career ==
=== 2000-2005 ===
While studying at Harvard University, Noujaim worked alongside her fellow peers towards developing Blue Hill Avenue, about the operations of gangs in Roxbury, Boston. Also during the duration of her degree, Noujaim notably worked under mentor Robb Moss.

In 2002, before her graduation, Noujaim was awarded the Gardiner fellowship under which she directed Mokattam, an Arabic film about a garbage-collecting village near Cairo in Egypt.

Noujaim joined the MTV news and documentary division as a segment producer for the documentary series UNfiltered.

In 2001, she left to produce and direct Startup.com under the guidance of documentary filmmaker D.A. Pennebaker in association with Pennebaker Hegedus Films. The feature-length documentary won the DGA and IDA Awards for best documentary. From collaboration with Pennebaker and Hegedus throughout her career, Noujaim's filmmaking techniques take insight from cinéma verité. Noujaim was awarded the Jacqueline Donnet Emerging Documentary Filmmaker Award in 2004.

She has since worked in both the Middle East and the United States as a cinematographer on various documentaries including Born Rich, Only the Strong Survive, and Down from the Mountain.

In 2004, she directed the feature-length film Control Room, a documentary about US Central Command and its relations with Al Jazeera and other news organizations that covered the 2003 invasion of Iraq. The film showed the unfolding of war through the descriptions and contributions of entities in media outlets. It also displayed information on the impact of skewed information during the Iraq war from different media source's operations and public motives. Noujaim achieves this through live footage from her time in Qatar of the war as well as interviews from news room correspondents.

Through this project, Noujaim wanted to portray images of war and question how viewers perceive them. The mentioned creative approach led her to focus her filmmaking on viewer's bias grounded in individual characteristics such as cultural background. In a review for Control Room Bill Stamets felt that throughout this creative path, Noujaim who filmed the majority of Control Room herself, never poses her own opinion on the topic in the film's story or give insight on her personal perception of war. The neutral stream for the film gives little guidance to viewers, prioritizing their interpretation, an artistic choice on behalf of Noujaim. Box office records were broken by Control Room while being screened at Film Forum in New York.

=== 2006-2011 ===
In 2006, Noujaim won a TED Prize for her work in Control Room. This made her the first and youngest woman to do so. She also received a nomination for the Writers Guild of America Award for Best Documentary Screenplay, shared with co-writer Julia Bacha. In 2007, she co-directed (with Sherief El Katsha) the film Shayfeen.com which was broadcast as part of the WhyDemocracy project. In 2012 she released Rafea: Solar Mama (which she directed with Mona Eldaeif). A documentary about a group of women leaving their villages to learn about solar engineering, only to return and solar power their own society.

=== 2012-2017 ===
In 2013, she released The Square, a film following the Egyptian revolution and the inspiration it has given to the world. While the film was being shot, Noujaim went missing, being found after an activist brought attention to her disappearance. Also during the duration of filming, Noujaim was arrested on three occasions. The arrests came as a result of accusations Noujaim was a spy, traitor, and for her general participation in protests while in Egypt. During the film's release period, the piece was withheld from viewers in Egypt due to censorship regulations. In an act to ensure Egyptian citizens saw the film, Noujaim released the film online in addition to the film being pirated in the country. Noujaim claimed this decision was made in strides towards freedom of speech as a filmmaker.

The Square was nominated for an Academy Award in best documentary in January 2014 and is highlighted as the first Egyptian film to earn such credentials. The Square also won critical acclaim in the 2013 Sundance Film Festival & the 2013 Toronto International Film Festival. She won the DGA Award for The Square in 2014.

Noujaim contributed to a book in 2016 which included a collection of statements by individuals on their experiences travelling to or visiting global squares. In the text, Noujaim disclosed her experiences and time spent in January 2011 at Tahrir Square. The given location in Cairo is commonly the site of chaos and protests which she expanded on.

=== 2017-present ===
In 2019, Noujaim and Amer directed The Great Hack, a documentary film which revolved around the Facebook–Cambridge Analytica data scandal. It had its world premiere at the Sundance Film Festival on January 26, 2019. It was released on July 24, 2019, by Netflix. Initially, Noujaim and Amer meant out to make a documentary revolving around the Sony Pictures hack, however the film evolved and shifted course as they started looking at how people's minds have been hacked and changed.

Noujaim and Amer directed The Vow a documentary series revolving around NXIVM and its leader Keith Raniere, which premiered in August 2020 on HBO. The second and final season premiered in October 2022, with Noujaim primarily directing without Amer. Noujaim previously took a NXIVM course after being recruited by Sara Bronfman.

In 2022, Noujaim served as an executive producer on Flight/Risk directed by Amer and Omar Mullick for Amazon Studios. In 2023, Noujaim served as an executive producer on Defiant directed by Amer, focusing on diplomacy and disinformation in the Russian invasion of Ukraine.

Noujaim directed and executive produced alongside Vikram Gandhi, The Man Will Burn, a documentary series revolving around Burning Man. It had its world premiere at the Tribeca Festival on June 9, 2026. and premiered July 9, 2026, on HBO.

== Pangea Day ==
After winning the TED Prize, Noujaim used her wish to organize Pangea Day, a live videoconference that took place in New York City, Rio de Janeiro, London, Dharamsala, Cairo, Jerusalem, and Kigali on May 10, 2008. The show was internationally broadcast over four hours through internet, television and mobile phones. It featured films, speakers, and music. The purpose of the event was to screen the work of filmmakers who created pieces around cultural reflection that posed conversation starters among the audience to unite people globally through film.

== Filmography ==
=== Film ===
Year	Title	Director	Producer	Notes
2000	Down from the Mountain	No	No	Cinematographer
2001	Startup.com	Yes	Executive	Also cinematographer, editor
2002	Only the Strong Survive	No	No	Cinematographer
2004	Control Room	Yes	Executive	Also cinematographer
2006	Encounter Point	No	Executive	
2009	Budrus	No	Executive	
2012	Rafea: Solar Mama	Yes	No	
2013	The Square	Yes	Yes	Also cinematographer
2017	The Breadwinner	No	Executive	
2019	The Great Hack	Yes	No	
2022	Flight/Risk	No	Executive	
2023	Defiant	No	Executive	

=== Television ===
Year	Title	Director	Producer	Notes
2019	Ramy	Yes	Co-Executive Producer	Episode: "Cairo Cowboy"
2020	The Vow	Yes	Executive	
2026	The Man Will Burn	Yes	Executive	

== Awards ==
Awards
Year	Award
2001	DGA Award for Best Documentary
2001	IDA Award for Best Documentary
2004	Jacqueline Donnet Emerging Documentary Filmmaker Award
2006	TED Prize
2014	DGA Award
2026	Pennebaker Award at Critics' Choice Documentary Awards
