= Elizabeth Woodward =

American film producer

- Education: Brown University
- Occupation: Film producer

Elizabeth Woodward is an American film producer and founder of Willa. She has produced On The Divide (2021), You Resemble Me (2021), and Another Body (2023).

== Life and career ==
Woodward graduated magna cum laude and Phi Beta Kappa from Brown University. She also received a master's from the University of Cambridge. During this time, Woodward was the managing director of the Ivy Film Festival. This led to an interest in film, which led Woodward to produce and direct short films, feature films, television shows and impact campaigns.

Woodward co-produced The Great Hack about the Facebook-Cambridge Analytica data scandal. and Persuasion Machines, a virtual reality experience which explored how household devices collect personal data on their users. Persuasion Machines was narrated by will.i.am. Both The Great Hack and Persuasion Machines premiered at the Sundance Film Festival.

Woodward founded Willa a film production company, to support bold stories by innovative filmmakers. Through WILLA, Woodward produced You Resemble Me, a film that explores radicalization in Europe, which premiered at the 78th Venice International Film Festival in the Venice Days section. She also produced On The Divide, a film that documents the lives of three latinx people in south Texas who find themselves in the gray area of the abortion debate, which at the Tribeca Film Festival. Woodward is also producing Another Body, a documentary that will explore the world of deepfake image based abuse which was selected for the Hot Docs 2021 Selected Projects and received the IDA Enterprise Documentary Fund Award.

Woodward speaks English, French and Italian.

== Filmography ==
=== Film ===
Year	Title	Role	Notes
2016	Prison Dogs	Impact Coordinator	
2017	Armed with Faith	Impact Coordinator	
2018	A Conversation with George Condo on Francis Bacon	Director	
2017	Bombshell: The Hedy Lamarr Story	Production Associate	
2018	Vote with your Tote	Producer	
2018	Afterward	Associate Producer	
2019	The Great Hack	Co-Producer	
2021	On The Divide	Producer	
2021	You Resemble Me	Producer	
2023	Another Body	Producer	
2024	No Sleep Till	Executive Producer	
2024	The Shepherd and the Bear	Producer	
2025	The Voice of Hind Rajab	Executive Producer	
2025	The Fence	Executive Producer	
2026	My NDA	Producer	
2026	The Boy With the Light-Blue Eyes	Producer	
TBA	Rubber Hut	Producer	

=== Television ===
Year	Title	Role	Notes
2016	Black is the New Black	Production Assistant	
2017	Why Trump Won	Production Assistant	
2020-2022	The Vow	Associate Producer/Field Producer	

== Awards, nominations and recognition ==
Woodward was included in the Forbes 30 Under 30 Media list in 2021 for her work, and in the Doc NYC 40 Under 40 list 2021. She was selected for Berlinale Talents and the Impact Partners Producers Fellowship

Her projects have been selected for various film festivals, shortlisted for Academy Awards, nominated for a Primetime Emmy Award, a BAFTA Award, an IDA award and won a Cinema Eye Award. Her films have been supported by Sundance Institute, Tribeca Institute, Chicken and Egg, Film Independent, Impact Partners, Field of Vision, Level Forward, Perspective Fund, and the New York Foundation for the Arts.
