= Charles Fager =

Charles Fager may refer to:

- Chuck Fager (born 1942), American activist, author, and member of the Quakers
- Charles Anthony Fager (1924–2014), American neurosurgeon and medical academic
