= Another Body =

2023 documentary film

- Theatrical release poster
- Directed by: Sophie Compton; Reuben Hamlyn
- Written by: Sophie Compton; Reuben Hamlyn; Isabel Freeman
- Produced by: Elizabeth Woodward; Sophie Compton; Reuben Hamlyn
- Cinematography: Nausheen Dadabhoy
- Edited by: Isabel Freeman; Rabab Haj Yahya
- Music by: Holland Andrews
- Production companies: Willa; Impact Partners; Murmation Productions; Remarkably Calm Productions
- Distributed by: Utopia; Willa (United States); Modern Films (United Kingdom)
- Release dates: March 11, 2023 (SXSW); October 20, 2023 (United States); November 24, 2023 (United Kingdom)
- Running time: 80 minutes
- Countries: United States; United Kingdom
- Language: English
- Box office: $24,384

Another Body is a 2023 documentary film, directed, written, and produced by Sophie Compton and Reuben Hamlyn. It follows a college student who seeks justice after finding deepfake pornography of herself online.

It had its world premiere at South by Southwest on March 11, 2023, where it won the Special Jury Award for Innovation in Storytelling. It was released in the United States on October 20, 2023, by Utopia and Willa, and was released in the United Kingdom on November 24, 2023, by Modern Films.

== Plot ==
A college student seeks justice after finding deepfake pornography of herself online.

== Production ==
As opposed to traditional documentaries where actors are used to recreate scenes, Another Body deepfaked the subjects in order to protect their identities, while preserving their emotions. Compton said, "It was really important to us that everything we anonymized was just like it happened and we only changed the details that were identifying. We wanted to reflect the exact truth and the spirit of the story."

== Release ==
The film had its world premiere at 2023 South by Southwest Film & TV Festival on March 11, 2023, where it won the Special Jury Award for Innovation in Storytelling. It also screened at Hot Docs International Film Festival on April 28, 2023. In August 2023, Utopia acquired U.S. distribution rights to the film, to co-distribute the film with Willa. In September 2023, Modern Films acquired U.K. distribution rights to the film. It was released in the United States on October 20, 2023. It was released in the United Kingdom on November 24, 2023.

== Reception ==
On the review aggregator website Rotten Tomatoes, 91% of 33 critics' reviews are positive, with an average rating of 7.7/10. The website's consensus reads: "Eye-opening and infuriating in equal measure, Another Body is a timely documentary that delves into a disturbing issue of growing concern." Metacritic, which uses a weighted average, assigned the film a score of 67 out of 100, based on 5 critics, indicating "generally favorable" reviews.

The Guardian's Peter Bradshaw gave the film 4/5 stars, writing, "Germaine Greer famously said that women have no idea how much men hate them. Her maxim has a new relevance in the light of this terrifying (and enraging) documentary about the explosion of deepfake porn targeting women". Benji Wilson of The Daily Telegraph also gave it 4/5 stars, calling its use of deepfake technology to conceal its subject's identity "a neat piece of table-turning that highlighted how willingly we can be duped by video footage, as well as the dangers of putting faces to names in public. Sensibly, however, the film didn't lay it on too thick: that would have been an unnecessary gimmick, a distraction from what was already a shocking tale." Owen Gleiberman of Variety called it "a groundbreaking, creepy, fascinating, and important documentary about a phenomenon that's only going to grow in significance: the deepfaking of pornography."

Lisa Kennedy of The New York Times was more critical, writing, "Another Body is most persuasive when experts weigh in on the reality-upending aspects of deepfake technology and image-based sex abuse. That the documentary does this by utilizing some of that technology to protect Taylor and Julia's identities raises its own ethical questions — ones that, even with the filmmakers' compassion and transparency, Another Body doesn't quite resolve."

== Accolades ==
Year	Award / Film Festival	Category	Recipient(s)	Result	Ref.
2023	South by Southwest	Special Jury Award for Innovation in Storytelling	Sophie Compton and Reuben Hamlyn	Won	
2023	British Independent Film Awards	Best Documentary	Sophie Compton, Reuben Hamlyn, Elizabeth Woodward, and Isabel Freeman	Nominated	
2023	British Independent Film Awards	Best Debut Director – Feature Documentary	Sophie Compton and Reuben Hamlyn	Nominated	
