= Motherhacker =

Scripted podcast by Gimlet Media

Motherhacker is a dark comedy scripted podcast produced by Gimlet Media and starring Carrie Coon.

== Background ==
Motherhacker is a dark comedy audio drama produced by Gimlet Media and starring Carrie Coon. The show was directed by Amanda Lipitz, written by Sandi Farkas, and featured Alan Cumming in addition to Coon. The story follows Bridget Landry, who falls for a phishing scam, tracks down the person who scammed her, and ends up working for them.

The show debuted on November 13, 2019, releasing all nine episodes of the first season. Each episode is between 10 and 15 minutes in length. Coon recorded her parts with strep throat in three days. The second season was released on June 7, 2021.

The show's soundtrack was done by Warpaint.

=== Cast ===
The cast includes the following actors:

- Alan Cumming
- Alex Goldman
- Carrie Coon
- Lucas Hedges
- Pedro Pascal
- Rupert Friend
- Tavi Gevinson
