= Ghosts of Sugar Land =

2019 documentary film

- Film poster
- Directed by: Bassam Tariq
- Written by: Thomas Niles; Bassam Tariq
- Starring: Jennifer Julian; Kc Okoro
- Production company: Field of Vision
- Distributed by: Netflix
- Release dates: January 26, 2019 (Sundance); September 15, 2019
- Running time: 21 minutes
- Country: United States
- Language: English

Ghosts of Sugar Land is a 2019 documentary film directed by Bassam Tariq, written by Thomas Niles and Bassam Tariq and starring Jennifer Julian and Kc Okoro.

== Summary ==
The premise revolves around a young American Muslim man, Mark, who converted to Islam and became radicalized, and the reasons for it.

== Release and reception ==
The film premiered at the 2019 Sundance Film Festival and was released on October 16, 2019, on Netflix. As of October 2021, 100% of the six critical reviews compiled on Rotten Tomatoes are positive, with an average rating of 8/10.

== Cast ==
- Jennifer Julian
- Kc Okoro
