= Pinky Promise (company) =

American film production company

- Industry: Film industry
- Founder: Jessamine Burgum
- Headquarters: Los Angeles, California, U.S.
- Area served: United States
- Key people: Jessamine Burgum; Kara Durrett
- Website: pinkypromisefilms.com

Pinky Promise is an American independent film and television production company, founded by Jessamine Burgum in 2021. The company has produced the films Honk for Jesus. Save Your Soul. (2022), The Starling Girl (2023), Bird (2024) and The Last Showgirl (2024).

== History ==
In January 2021, it was announced Jessamine Burgum had launched Pinky Promise focusing on producing and financing films by upcoming and established directors. Burgum independently raised $26.5 million to launch the company, by sending cold emails. Kara Durrett later joined the company.

== Filmography ==
=== 2020s ===
Release Date	Title	Notes
September 2, 2022	Honk for Jesus. Save Your Soul.	distributed by Focus Features
May 12, 2023	The Starling Girl	distributed by Bleecker Street
October 20, 2023	If You Were the Last	distributed by Peacock
November 1, 2024	The Graduates	distributed by The Future of Film Is Female
November 8, 2024	Bird	distributed by Mubi
December 13, 2024	The Last Showgirl	distributed by Roadside Attractions
March 28, 2025	Art for Everybody	distributed by Fourth Act Film
June 6, 2025	I Don't Understand You	distributed by Vertical
September 26, 2025	Eleanor the Great	distributed by Sony Pictures Classics and TriStar Pictures
March 13, 2026	The Shepherd and the Bear	distributed by Willa

=== Upcoming ===
Release Date	Title	Notes
February 12, 2027	Wishful Thinking	distributed by Sony Pictures Classics
TBA	Peaches	distributed by Independent Film Company
