= Flight/Risk =

- Official poster
- Directed by: Karim Amer; Omar Mullick
- Based on: Crashes of two Boeing 737 MAX planes
- Produced by: Karim Amer; Mike Lerner; Jia; Leen Karadsheh; Paul McGuire
- Cinematography: Omar Mullick
- Edited by: Federico Rosenzvit
- Music by: Reinhold Heil; Michael Tuller
- Production company: The Othrs
- Distributed by: Amazon Studios
- Release date: September 9, 2022
- Running time: 98 minutes
- Country: United States
- Language: English

Flight/Risk is a 2022 American documentary film that examines the crashes of two Boeing 737 MAX planes through the perspective of surviving family members, lawyers, and whistleblowers. It is directed by Karim Amer and Omar Mullick.

It was released on September 9, 2022, by Amazon Studios. It was nominated for a News & Documentary Emmy Award for Outstanding Investigative Documentary.

== Premise ==
The documentary examines the crashes of two Boeing 737 MAX planes that claimed the lives of 346 people on board. Told through the perspective of journalist Dominic Gates, surviving family member Zipporah Kuria, lawyers Justin Green and Eric Havian, and whistleblower Edward Pierson.

== Production ==
In 2019, Karim Amer and Jehane Noujaim met with Mary Inman at a conference, where she informed them a client of hers, Edward Pierson of Boeing was going to be coming forward surrounding the two crashes, testifying in front of Congress. 24 hours later, producer, Leen Karadsheh went to Washington, and began following Pierson. Initially, Pierson turned down their requests to document, but had several conversations with the filmmakers who stated they would stay out of his way and in the background, with the two sharing the same goal of bringing pressure to Boeing. During production, subjects were not asked to sign releases until after filming had concluded, with no limits on what they could later retract.

== Release ==
It was released on September 9, 2022, by Amazon Studios.

== Reception ==
On the review aggregator website Rotten Tomatoes, 86% of 7 critics' reviews are positive, with an average rating of 7.60/10.

Soren Anderson reviewing the film for The Seattle Times wrote: "Despite its flaws, 'Flight/Risk' is a comprehensive and stinging critique of a once-proud company that has lost its way and is struggling to make a comeback. And it's a tribute to the people who died and the families who mourn them." Christopher Llewellyn Reed of Film Festival Today gave the film 3 out of 4 stars writing: "The story, full of righteous outrage, is what makes it. I recommend the documentary to everyone, even though it will make you never want to fly again."

== Awards and nominations ==
Awards and nominations for Flight/Risk
Award	Date of ceremony	Category	Recipient(s)	Result	Ref.
News and Documentary Emmy Awards	44th News and Documentary Emmy Awards	Outstanding Investigative Documentary	Amazon Prime Video	Pending	
