= Vikram Gandhi =

American documentary filmmaker, media personality and producer

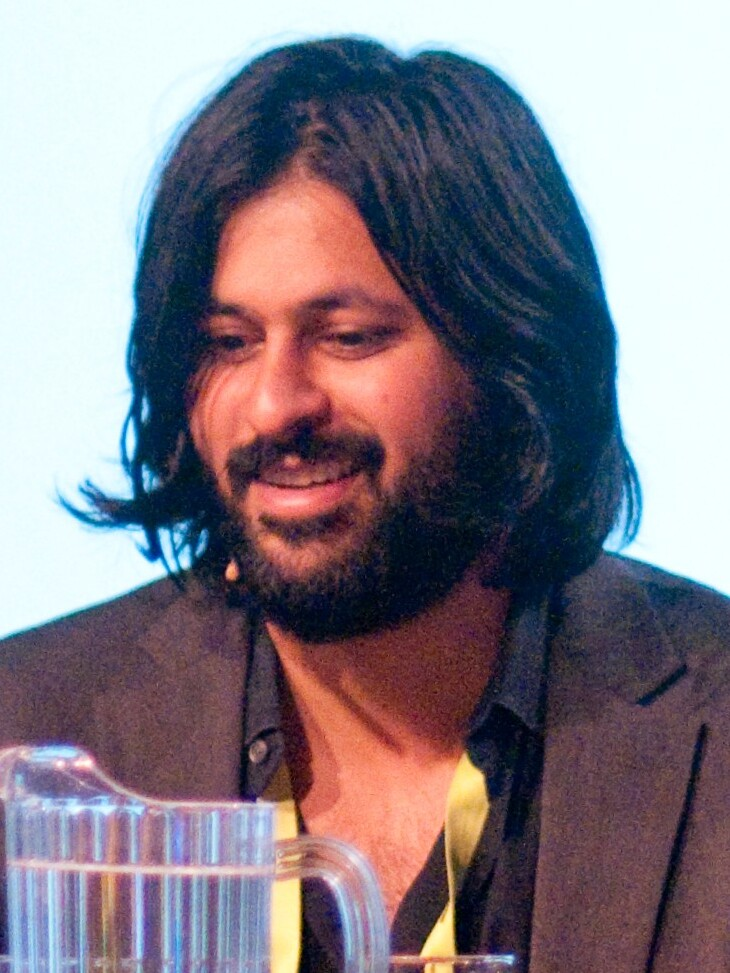
- Gandhi in 2012
- Born: New York City, U.S.
- Education: Columbia University (BA)
- Occupations: Filmmaker; journalist; actor; producer

Vikram Gandhi is an Indian American documentary filmmaker, producer, actor, and journalist. His works include Kumaré (2011), Barry (2016), Trigger Warning with Killer Mike (2019), 69: The Saga of Danny Hernandez (2020).

== Biography ==
Gandhi was born in New York and grew up in a Hindu household in New Jersey. His parents are Punjabi immigrants from Burma and his father works at the Columbia Presbyterian Hospital. He received his B.A. from Columbia University in 2000.

After college, Gandhi worked as a freelance video journalist and reported on political, economic and human rights issues in Asia for The Economist, Time, ABC and CNN. He also worked as a cinematographer and producer of documentary films and commercials, and his clients included American Express, Energizer, Yahoo and Katy Perry.

As a documentary filmmaker, Gandhi covered the emergence of the yoga industry in the US and, inspired by his own skepticism about religious movements, he started his own fake spiritual movement and called himself "Kumare," which is based on his middle name, Kumar. Impersonating a fake Indian guru, he gained a following in Arizona. He filmed his interactions with his devotees and made the 2011 documentary Kumare, which won the SXSW 2011 Audience Award for Best Documentary and was nominated for a 2011 DOC NYC Viewfinders Grand Jury Prize and a 2013 Cinema Eye Audience Choice Prize.

Vikram joined HBO's Vice as a producer and correspondent in 2012. In 2016, he directed and produced the Barack Obama biopic Barry, which he describes as a "superhero origin story". He also appeared in Batman v Superman: Dawn of Justice as himself. He later produced and directed the Netflix series Trigger Warning with Killer Mike and Grass Is Greener.

In 2020, Gandhi reprised his role as Kumare for the comedy series The Guru Inside You that aired on First Look Media's streaming service Topic. He also directed the Hulu documentary 69: The Saga of Danny Hernandez.

Gandhi directed and executive produced alongside Jehane Noujaim, The Man Will Burn, a four-part documentary series revolving around Burning Man. It had its world premiere at Tribeca Festival on June 9, 2026. and premiered on July 9, 2026, on HBO.

== Filmography ==
=== Film ===
Year	Title	Director	Producer	Writer	Actor	Notes
2011	Kumaré	Yes	Yes	Yes	Yes	Documentary; also appeared as himself / Kumare
2016	Batman v Superman: Dawn of Justice	No	No	No	Yes	Cameo as himself
2016	Barry	Yes	Yes	No	No	
2019	Grass Is Greener	Yes	Yes	No	No	Netflix documentary
2020	69: The Saga of Danny Hernandez	Yes	No	No	No	Hulu documentary

=== Television ===
Year	Title	Director	Producer	Role	Notes
2012–present	Vice	No	Yes	Yes	Plays Correspondent HBO series
2019	Trigger Warning with Killer Mike	Yes	Yes	No	Netflix series
2020	The Guru Inside You	No	No	Yes	Plays Kumare Topic comedy series; reprised role
2026	The Man Will Burn	Yes	Yes	No	4-part documentary series; co-directed with Jehane Noujaim
