= Trigger Warning with Killer Mike =

American Netflix docuseries

- Genre: Docuseries
- Developed by: Michael "Killer Mike" Render; Daniel Weidenfeld; Nick Weidenfeld; Vernon Chatman
- Written by: Daniel Weidenfeld; Nick Weidenfeld; Vernon Chatman; Michael Render
- Directed by: Vikram Gandhi
- Presented by: Michael "Killer Mike" Render
- Country of origin: United States
- Original language: English
- No. of seasons: 1
- No. of episodes: 6

Production
- Executive producers: Michael "Killer Mike" Render; Daniel Weidenfeld; Nick Weidenfeld; Vernon Chatman; Alex Orr
- Producer: Ty Walker
- Cinematography: Marco Cordero
- Editors: Daniel Brown; Andy Morrish; Adam Locke-Norton; Neil Mahoney
- Running time: 22–27 minutes
- Production companies: Elegant Elephant Productions; Working For Monsters; Friends Night; Fake Wood Wallpaper Films; Debaser

Original release
- Network: Netflix
- Release: January 18, 2019

Trigger Warning with Killer Mike is an American television docuseries on Netflix. The six-episode first season was released on January 18, 2019. The show, hosted by rapper Killer Mike, explores issues in America that affect the black community, including drugs, gangs, religion, and poverty.

== Episodes ==
No.	Title	Directed by	Written by	Original release date
1	"Living Black"	Vikram Gandhi	Daniel Weidenfeld, Nick Weidenfeld, Vernon Chatman, & Michael Render	January 18, 2019
Mike tries to solicit only black-owned businesses – including food, stores, and transportation – and explores ways for those businesses to receive more attention.
2	"F**k School"	Vikram Gandhi	Daniel Weidenfeld, Nick Weidenfeld, Vernon Chatman, & Michael Render	January 18, 2019
Mike looks at ways to revamp education curricula with practical job training.
3	"White Gang Privilege"	Vikram Gandhi	Daniel Weidenfeld, Nick Weidenfeld, Vernon Chatman, & Michael Render	January 18, 2019
Mike helps the Crips and Bloods gangs develop their own legitimate brands through new soda businesses.
4	"New Jesus"	Vikram Gandhi	Daniel Weidenfeld, Nick Weidenfeld, Vernon Chatman, & Michael Render	January 18, 2019
Mike creates a new religion based on the lessons and example of his friend Sleepy.
5	"Outside the Box"	Vikram Gandhi	Daniel Weidenfeld, Nick Weidenfeld, Vernon Chatman, & Michael Render	January 18, 2019
Mike explores music's potential for breaching political barriers.
6	"Kill Your Master"	Vikram Gandhi	Daniel Weidenfeld, Nick Weidenfeld, Vernon Chatman, & Michael Render	January 18, 2019
Mike buys a plot of land and founds the nation of New Africa.
