= Condom Hut =

Defunct condom store in Rhode Island, US

Coordinates: 41.782858°N 71.464042°W

Condom Hut was a short-lived condom store in Rhode Island that was opened in 1992, at the peak of the AIDS epidemic in the United States. The first drive-through condom store in the state, its owner Emanuella DelVecchio opened the Condom Hut after she was inspired to raise awareness of HIV/AIDS and safe sex. The store experienced persistent vandalism and protests, and closed a year later due to declining business. The events are the basis of the upcoming film Rubber Hut, which stars Grace Van Patten.

== History ==
=== Origin ===
Opened in 1992 in Cranston, Rhode Island, Condom Hut was the first drive-through condom store to operate in the state. It was owned by Emanuella DelVecchio, (Note: DelVecchio's surname is also spelled "Del Vecchio" in some news articles.) a 32-year-old entrepreneur and former Pan Am flight attendant. DelVecchio repurposed a former Fotomat photo development booth, which was painted hot pink and white, in a shopping center in the majority-Italian neighborhood of Knightsville. She owned a nail salon in the shopping center and came up with the idea after watching a television news program on HIV/AIDS and condom use for the virus, which featured an interview with the owner of a New York condom store. She said her goal was to make people more aware of the virus and safe sex.

=== Reactions and operation ===
The Providence Journal wrote in 2026 that the Condom Hut's opening was met with a "strong negative reaction from a predominantly Roman Catholic community [...] at the height of the AIDS crisis." Prior to its opening, some local residents and business owners were reported to call city hall to have her sales license revoked, although DelVecchio held a state sales permit and the city did not require licenses except for sales on Sundays. The city's council president and the director of the Office of Family Life of the Diocese of Providence opposed the opening of her store. It also faced persistent vandals and protestors. Prior to its opening in July 1992, one of its windows was broken and the roof and windows were vandalized with black paint. The opening unintentionally coincided with the beginning of the city's patron saint feast days due to a delayed delivery of condoms. A Catholic herself, DelVecchio stated in response to protests: "I believe in my religion, but I disagree with the church. I think it should be a little more real about issues such as abstinence."

A Rhode Island Monthly reporter later spent a night at the Condom Hut for a feature in the magazine's December 1992 issue. The store closed by July 1993, after business had sharply declined.

== Film ==
A film based on DelVecchio and the Condom Hut, titled Rubber Hut, began filming in Warwick, Rhode Island, in 2026. The film was written and directed by Hanna Gray Organschi and stars Grace Van Patten.
