= Revolution Rent =

- Official poster
- Directed by: Andy Señor Jr.; Victor Patrick Alvarez
- Written by: Andy Señor Jr.
- Produced by: Scott Fenn; Christine O'Malley
- Cinematography: Victor Patrick Alvarez
- Edited by: Devin Tanchum; Doug Blush; Christopher DeLatorre
- Music by: Carlos Alvarez
- Production companies: HBO Documentary Films; Nederlander Worldwide Entertainment
- Distributed by: HBO
- Release dates: November 8, 2019 (DOC NYC); June 15, 2021 (United States)
- Running time: 91 minutes
- Countries: United States; Cuba
- Languages: English; Spanish

Revolution Rent is a 2019 American documentary film, directed by Andy Señor Jr. and Victor Patrick Alvarez. It follows Señor Jr., as he prepares an adaptation of Rent in Cuba, exploring his homeland and heritage. Neil Patrick Harris and Karim Amer serve as executive producers. The film had its world premiere at DOC NYC on November 8, 2019. It was released on June 15, 2021, by HBO.

== Synopsis ==
Andy Señor Jr. returns to his homeland of Cuba, as he prepares an adaptation of Rent while exploring his heritage and homeland.

== Release ==
The film had its world premiere at DOC NYC on November 8, 2019. In April 2021, HBO Documentary Films acquired distribution rights to the film, and set it for a June 15, 2021, release.

== Reception ==
=== Critical response ===
Revolution Rent holds a 63% approval rating on review aggregator website Rotten Tomatoes, based on eight reviews, with an average of 6.3/10.
