= My NDA =

2026 American documentary film

- Directed by: Juliane Dressner; Miriam Shor
- Produced by: Juliane Dressner; Miriam Shor; Elizabeth Woodward; Hanna Gray Organschi
- Starring: Ifeoma Ozoma; Ashley Kostial; Lachlan Cartwright
- Cinematography: Juliane Dressner
- Edited by: Jen Fineran
- Music by: Judy Hyman; Jeff Claus
- Production companies: Willa; Unlikeable Woman; Reify Films; Lazy Muse Inc.
- Release date: March 12, 2026 (SXSW)
- Running time: 92 minutes
- Country: United States
- Language: English

My NDA is a 2026 American documentary film directed and produced by Juliane Dressner and Miriam Shor. It follows three people bound by non-disclosure agreements exposing how the contract is weaponized.

It had its world premiere at the 2026 South by Southwest Film & TV Festival on March 12, 2026.

== Premise ==
Follows former Pinterest employee Ifeoma Ozoma, former SAP employee Ashley Kostial, and former National Enquirer journalist Lachlan Cartwright, all three of whom are bound by non-disclosure agreements, exposing how the contract is weaponized. The film also follows Ozoma's work with legislators on the Silenced No More Act in the state of California, which prevents legal retaliation against employees who speak out about discrimination.

== Production ==
In July 2021, it was announced Miriam Shor and Juliane Dressner were in production on a documentary revolving around non-disclosure agreements. Elizabeth Woodward and Hanna Gray Organschi serve as producers. It was selected for the 2024 Film Independent Fast Track Film Finance Market.

== Release ==
It had its world premiere at the 2026 South by Southwest Film & TV Festival on March 12, 2026.
