= 69: The Saga of Danny Hernandez =

- Film poster
- Directed by: Vikram Gandhi
- Produced by: Jeremy Falson; Vikram Gandhi; Jude Harris
- Starring: 6ix9ine
- Cinematography: Ryan Francis White
- Edited by: Cameron Dennis
- Music by: Agung Bagus; Daniel Bensi
- Production companies: Gunpowder & Sky; Prophets
- Distributed by: Hulu
- Release date: November 16, 2020
- Running time: 102 minutes
- Country: United States
- Language: English

69: The Saga of Danny Hernandez is a 2020 American true crime documentary film about Daniel Hernandez, a rapper, songwriter, social media personality, and convicted felon who is known professionally as 6ix9ine, or Tekashi69. The film details Hernandez's rise as a musician, as well as his gang affiliation and multiple arrests. It was directed by Vikram Gandhi and released on Hulu on November 16, 2020.
