= I Don't Understand You (film) =

2024 horror comedy film

- Theatrical release poster
- Directed by: David Joseph Craig; Brian Crano
- Written by: David Joseph Craig; Brian Crano
- Produced by: Jessamine Burgum; Kara Durrett; Joel Edgerton; Nash Edgerton; Gabriela Leibowitz
- Starring: Nick Kroll; Andrew Rannells; Morgan Spector; Eleonora Romandini; Amanda Seyfried
- Cinematography: Lowell A. Meyer
- Edited by: Nancy Richardson
- Music by: Saunder Jurriaans; Danny Bensi
- Production companies: Pinky Promise; Panoramic Media Company
- Distributed by: Vertical
- Release dates: March 8, 2024 (SXSW); June 6, 2025 (United States)
- Running time: 96 minutes
- Countries: United States; Italy
- Languages: English; Italian
- Box office: $276,299

I Don't Understand You is a 2024 comedy horror film written and directed by David Joseph Craig and Brian Crano. It stars Nick Kroll, Andrew Rannells, Morgan Spector, Eleonora Romandini and Amanda Seyfried. The film is about a gay couple vacationing in Italy while hoping to become parents.

== Plot ==
Dom and Cole are a wealthy gay couple living in Los Angeles, trying to navigate adoption. They celebrate their 10th anniversary with a trip to Italy, and are happily surprised to receive a call from a prospective birth mother named Candace at the start of the trip.

Daniele, an old friend of Dom's father, arranges a dinner for their anniversary at a farm restaurant in rural Orvieto. After a difficult journey through the countryside they are warmly welcomed by Zia Luciana, the once-famous proprietor. She immediately serves them pizza and wine and tells them a story in Italian about her deceased son Giovanni.

On the way back from the toilet, Cole finds Luciana's husband who is being kept alive in an iron lung. It freaks him out and the couple decide to leave, but before they can the power goes out. In the ensuing chaos Cole accidentally knocks Luciana down the stairs. After failing to resuscitate her, they carry her upstairs and hide her under the table.

Massimo, Luciana's other son, arrives, eventually followed by his fiancée Francesca. Massimo is able to get the couple’s rental car out of the mud and tries to convince them to stay for a drink. He finds Dom’s phone and sees text messages from Candace, indicating that she is in labor. He excitedly tells the couple they are going to be “dad”, but they misunderstand, thinking he is saying “dead”, and stab him in self-defense.

Francesca flees when she sees Massimo’s dead body, and Cole chases her and tries to explain that the whole thing is a misunderstanding. Dom follows them in Massimo’s truck and accidentally hits and kills Francesca. They throw all three bodies into the fire of the pizza oven and clean up the house before leaving in a hurry, hitting a farmer with their rental car on the way out.

The farmer’s wife calls the police the next morning. While investigating, they find Cole’s pocket knife and vow to track down the murderers. Meanwhile, Dom and Cole fly directly to Pittsburgh to meet Candace and their son, whom they name Giovanni. A few years later, Dom, Cole, and Gio prepare for the possibility of adding another child to their family and decide it is in their best interest not to share the story of their journey to the hospital to meet their firstborn.

== Cast ==
- Nick Kroll as Dom
- Andrew Rannells as Cole
- Morgan Spector as Massimo
- Eleonora Romandini as Francesca
- Amanda Seyfried as Candace
- Nunzia Schiano as Zia Luciana
- Paolo Romano as Daniele
- Nicola Acunzo as Carabineiri Officer
- Giuseppe Attanasio as Rimaldo
- Jessamine Burgum as Young Mother
- Valerio Da Silva as Waiter
- Cecilia Dazzi as Ilaria
- Arcangelo Iannace as Farmer
- Fabio Salerno as Detective
- Leonardo Verni as Jacopo

== Production ==
=== Direction and screenplay ===
The film was directed by David Joseph Craig and Brian Crano, who also co-wrote the screenplay. Crano is known for his work on television series such as Simply Plimpton. Craig has previously worked primarily as an actor. He has appeared in films such as All These Small Moments and The Prodigal Son in smaller roles. Like their protagonists, Craig and Crano are married. Crano has already cast his husband in a leading role in his second feature film Permission.

=== Cast and filming ===
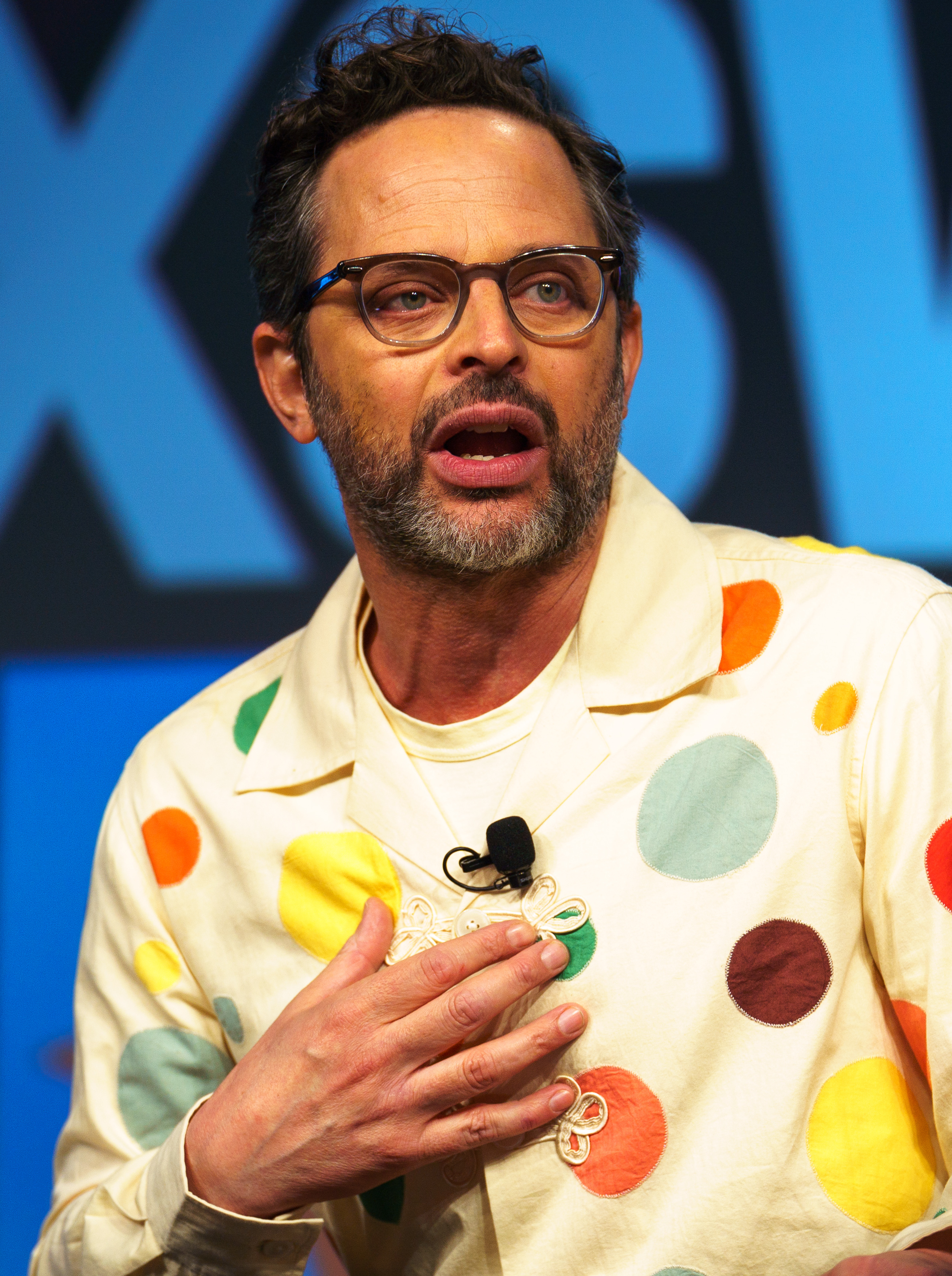
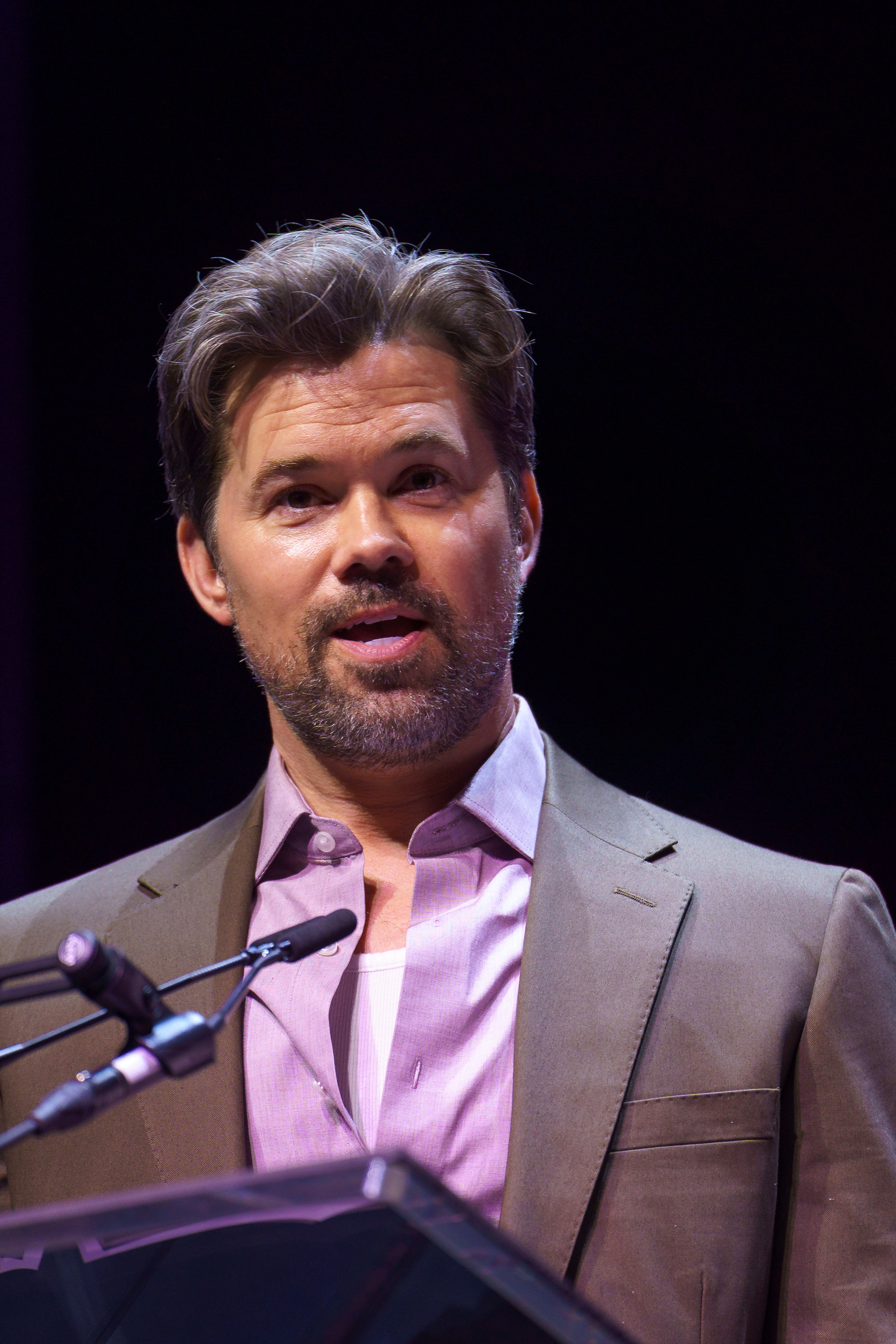
Nick Kroll (top) and Andrew Rannells (bottom) star as Cole and Dom

Nick Kroll and Andrew Rannells play Dom and Cole in the lead roles. Paolo Romano plays Daniele, an old friend of Dom's father, whom they visit in Italy. Arcangelo Iannace plays the farmer who helps them. Nunzia Schiano plays the role of restaurant owner Zia Luciana. Morgan Spector plays her son Massimo and Eleanora Romandini plays his fiancée Francesca. Amanda Seyfried plays Candace, the woman whose child Dom and Cole want to adopt, in a supporting role. Other roles were cast with Giuseppe Attanasio and Cecilia Dazzi.

Cinematographer Lowell A. Meyer has most recently worked on films such as The Chaos Cop by Jim Cummings, Greener Grass by Jocelyn DeBoer and Dawn Luebbe and, together with Jarin Blaschke, on the thriller Knock at the Cabin by M. Night Shyamalan.

=== Music ===
The film music was composed by Danny Bensi and Saunder Jurriaans, who have worked together on a number of films in the past, including The Gift, The Prodigal Son, The Discovery, Wolfpack, Edison and God's Creatures.

== Release ==
The film premiered at South by Southwest (SXSW) on March 8, 2024, Overlook Film Festival on April 4, 2024, and Frameline Film Festival on June 22, 2024. In August 2024, Vertical acquired distribution rights to the film in North America, the United Kingdom and Ireland, planning to theatrically release it in early 2025. The film was released in the United States on June 6, 2025.

== Reception ==
On the review aggregator website Rotten Tomatoes, 52% of 54 critics' reviews are positive. The website's consensus reads: "Amusing as a satire of Americans abroad but less convincing as a horror hybrid, I Don't Understand You gets some mileage from Andrew Rannells and Nick Kroll's chemistry but can't quite overcome its tonal language barrier." Metacritic, which uses a weighted average, assigned the film a score of 57 out of 100, based on 11 critics, indicating "mixed or average" reviews.

Alison Foreman of IndieWire gave the film a rating of A− and she wrote, "Outrageously snappy and unapologetically fun, I Don't Understand You is a must-see for anyone who likes queer romance, horror-comedy, and/or hot Italians."

Rocco T. Thompson of Daily Dead gave the film a movie score of 3.5/5 and wrote, "I Don't Understand You is lighter fare for horror fans, but has bloody surprises in store for those willing to take this very bad, very funny trip. See it with your nearest and dearest and plenty of Grappa. Salute!"

David Rooney of The Hollywood Reporter gave a positive feedback to the film and he said, "A gay adoption comedy that veers off into travel porn before taking a hard left into dark fish-out-of-water farce, I Don't Understand You is a lot fresher and more enjoyable than its generic title might suggest."

However, Brian Tallerico of RogerEbert.com had a negative reaction to the film and he said, "Making a movie in which Americans basically carve a path of destruction in another country requires a truly deft tonal hand, and this one just doesn't make sense."
