= Fairyland (film) =

2023 American drama film

- Theatrical release poster
- Directed by: Andrew Durham
- Screenplay by: Andrew Durham
- Based on: Fairyland: A Memoir of My Father by Alysia Abbott
- Produced by: Andrew Durham; Sofia Coppola; Megan Carlson; Laure Sudreau; Greg Lauritano; Siena Oberman
- Starring: Emilia Jones; Scoot McNairy; Cody Fern; Maria Bakalova; Nessa Dougherty; Adam Lambert; Geena Davis
- Cinematography: Greta Zozula
- Edited by: Peter Cabadahagan; Lawrence Klein
- Music by: Michael Penn
- Production company: American Zoetrope
- Distributed by: Lionsgate; Willa
- Release dates: January 20, 2023 (Sundance); October 10, 2025 (United States)
- Running time: 116 minutes
- Country: United States
- Languages: English; French

Fairyland is a 2023 American coming-of-age drama film written and directed by Andrew Durham (in his feature directorial debut) and produced by Sofia Coppola. It is based on Alysia Abbott's memoir Fairyland: A Memoir of My Father. The film stars Emilia Jones, Scoot McNairy, Cody Fern, Maria Bakalova, Nessa Dougherty, Adam Lambert, and Geena Davis.

Fairyland premiered on January 20, 2023, at the 2023 Sundance Film Festival, and was released on October 10, 2025, by Lionsgate and Willa.

== Premise ==
Shortly after the death of her mother in a car accident in 1973, Alysia Abbott and her gay father Steve move to San Francisco where he can live openly. Steve's bohemian lifestyle clashes with the expectations of being a parent from both the outside world and Alysia herself, who occasionally wishes for less of the independence her father gives her. Their bonds and duty to each other are tested in painful and sudden ways. Years later, she discovers a world of artists and writers, but also the AIDS crisis when people around her contract the virus to which her father also falls victim.

== Cast ==
- Emilia Jones as Alysia Abbott
  - Nessa Dougherty as a younger Alysia Abbott
- Scoot McNairy as Steve Abbott
- Geena Davis as Munca
- Cody Fern as Eddie Body
- Maria Bakalova as Paulette
- Adam Lambert as Charlie
- Bella Murphy as Yayne
- Ryan Thurston as Johnny

== Production ==
In 2013, American Zoetrope obtained the screen rights for Alysia Abbott's memoir Fairyland: A Memoir of My Father, to be adapted by Sofia Coppola with Andrew Durham and produced by her with her brother Roman Coppola. Durham later became the film's sole writer and director while Coppola remained involved as a producer.

In June 2022, production wrapped with Emilia Jones, Scoot McNairy, Geena Davis, Adam Lambert, Cody Fern, Bella Murphy and Nessa Dougherty starring. In August 2022, Maria Bakalova was also revealed to be appearing in the film.

== Release ==
It premiered on January 20, 2023, at the Sundance Film Festival. In August 2025, Lionsgate and Willa acquired distribution rights to the film, and released it on October 10, 2025.

== Reception ==
On review aggregator website Rotten Tomatoes, the film has an approval rating of 97% based on 33 reviews, with an average rating of 6.5/10. The critics consensus reads, "Drawing on one family's real-life experiences, the powerfully acted Fairyland pays poignant tribute to love and resilience in the face of adversity and tragedy." Metacritic, which uses a weighted average, assigned a score of 68 out of 100, based on 9 reviews indicating "generally favorable reviews".
