= Rubber Hut =

Upcoming American drama film

- Directed by: Hanna Gray Organschi
- Written by: Hanna Gray Organschi
- Produced by: Elizabeth Woodward; Tara Sheffer
- Starring: Grace Van Patten; Emmy Rossum; Michael Imperioli; Ariana Greenblatt; Rosemarie DeWitt; Chris Bauer; Fina Strazza; Fisher Stevens; Ricky Staffieri; Will Harrison
- Production companies: Willa; Stone Fruit Productions
- Country: United States
- Language: English

Rubber Hut is an upcoming American drama film written and directed by Hanna Gray Organschi in her directorial debut. It stars Grace Van Patten.

The film is based on the experiences of Emanuella DelVecchio, a former flight attendant who opened a drive-through condom store named the Condom Hut.

== Premise ==
In 1992, Rhode Island, Emanuella opens a drive-thru condom shop in her town. Overnight, she becomes a hero to teens and an unlikely threat to her tight-knit Italian Catholic community.

== Cast ==
- Grace Van Patten
- Emmy Rossum
- Michael Imperioli
- Ariana Greenblatt
- Rosemarie DeWitt
- Chris Bauer
- Fina Strazza
- Fisher Stevens
- Ricky Staffieri
- Will Harrison

== Production ==
In March 2026, it was announced that Grace Van Patten had joined the cast of the film, with Hanna Gray Organschi directing from a screenplay she wrote. Elizabeth Woodward serves as a producer under her Willa banner, with Anne Carey and Jason Michael Berman set to executive produce. The film was previously selected for the 2024 Film Independent Fast Track Film Finance Market, Sundance Institute Directing and Screenwriting Labs, and The Gotham Film & Media Institute's Gotham Project Market Week. In June 2026, Emmy Rossum, Rosemarie DeWitt, Ariana Greenblatt, Chris Bauer, Fina Strazza, Fisher Stevens, Michael Imperioli, Ricky Staffieri, and Will Harrison joined the cast of the film.

Principal photography began in June 2026 in Cranston, Rhode Island.
