= These Birds Walk =

- Directed by: Omar Mullick; Bassam Tariq
- Produced by: Omar Mullick; Bassam Tariq; Valentina Canavesio; Sonejuhi Sinha
- Cinematography: Omar Mullick
- Edited by: Sonejuhi Sinha
- Distributed by: Oscilloscope Laboratories
- Release date: March 1, 2013 (True/False Film Festival)
- Running time: 71 minutes
- Country: United States

These Birds Walk is a 2013 documentary film directed by Omar Mullick and Bassam Tariq that follows the life of a runaway boy in Pakistan as well as the humanitarian efforts of Abdul Sattar Edhi.

The film premiered at South by Southwest 2013 and was met with a positive response from critics. It opened in theaters in the US in November 2013 and was available on Blu-ray and DVD from 2014.

== Plot ==
In Karachi, Pakistan, a runaway boy's life hangs on one critical question: where is home? The streets, an orphanage, or with the family he fled in the first place? Simultaneously heart-rending and life-affirming, These Birds Walk documents the struggles of these wayward street children and the humanitarians looking out for them.

== Production ==
The starting point of the film is Edhi. He washes naked runaway children who look undernourished, and he says that his philanthropic reputation doesn't mean anything, telling the filmmakers, “If you want to find me, look to ordinary people.” For the rest of the film, Tariq and Mullick follow the children in the Edhi Home, in particular a child named Omar, and the ambulance driver, Asad, who was once a street kid himself.

Omar has run away from his family's home in Taliban country and ends up in Karachi. Aided by Asad, Omar goes to the Edhi Foundation's shelter for homeless children. Asad reveals that until the parents are found or come looking for the boy, Omar, like the other runaway children, will remain under Edhi's care. Asad's responsibilities as an ambulance driver include picking up children from police stations, taking them home, and transporting dead bodies. He admits that driving with dead bodies is easier than returning the children to their homes because sometimes the children must go back to abusive parents.

Omar and the other children are bored and sad in the shelter. They divide their time between praying and fighting, and they bond over conversations about God and what it means to be a man. Omar thinks of himself as strong and fierce, which earns him a fight with a much larger boy in a prolonged fight scene.

Eventually, Asad drives Omar back to his village through the night and returns him to his family. The reunion is underwhelming, and his mother admits that all her children have spent time at the Edhi Foundation.

The filmmakers don't dwell on the boy's personal history or the workings of the Edhi Foundation, rather, the film captures how Omar spends his days while in the home with other runaway children.

These Birds Walk steers away from statistics and social context of child runaways in Pakistan. However, Tariq and Mullick felt that statistics would oversimplify the role of the people in the film, and Tariq said, “They have trusted us with their lives. And we would sidestep it all for this idea of ‘relevance’ or ‘social context.’” The film is also an example of cinema vérité since the filmmakers present the story as they observed it. The film relies on the children’s pure emotion rather than on voiceover commentary or talking heads to tell the story.

== Critical response ==
These Birds Walk was met with largely positive reviews. On review aggregator website Rotten Tomatoes, the film has a 96 percent rating and an average rating of 8/10 based on 27 reviews.

Vadim Rizov of Filmmaker Magazine said, “It’s more rough than tender but never gratuitous or exploitative, hard to shake, and a fine entry in cinema’s history of tortured male youth.”

Adam Nayman of Point of View Magazine praised Tariq and Mullick for their use of handheld digital cameras, which “permit an even greater proximity and intimacy with the subjects. As a contemporary example of the practice of ‘direct cinema,’ These Birds Walk is extremely impressive.”

Tom Roston of PBS said at the True/False Film Festival, "This seemingly simple vérité depiction of boys in a Pakistani orphanage has a lyrical quality that shows the beauty and sadness of growing up poor in Pakistan."

== Accolades ==
Festival	Award	Category
Abu Dhabi Film Festival (2013)	Won Black Pearl Award	Best Documentary Feature Bassam Tariq Omar Mullick
Abu Dhabi Film Festival (2013)	Won Child Protection Award	Best Film Bassam Tariq Omar Mullick
Hot Docs Canadian International Documentary Festival (2013)	Won Filmmaker-to-Filmmaker Award	Bassam Tariq Omar Mullick Tied with The Machine Which Makes Everything Disappear (2012)
Nashville Film Festival (2013)	Won Special Jury Prize	Vigilance in Filmmaking Omar Mullick
SXSW Film Festival (2013)	Nominated Audience Award	Visions Omar Mullick Bassam Tariq
Zurich Film Festival (2013)	Nominated Golden Eye	Best International Documentary Film Omar Mullick Bassam Tariq
Zurich Film Festival (2013)	Won Special Mention	International Documentary Film Omar Mullick Bassam Tariq
