= Aman Ali (comedian) =

American comedian and journalist (born 1985)

- Born: Aman Ali; March 27, 1985 (age 41); Reynoldsburg, Ohio, U.S.
- Education: Lincoln High School; Kent State University
- Occupations: Comedian; storyteller; journalist; writer
- Spouse: Hannah Behi (m. 2021)

Comedy career
- Years active: 2006–present
- Medium: Stand-up, newspaper, television
- Genre: Observational comedy
- Subjects: Indian culture, Muslim American culture, Islamic humour
- Website: amanali.net

Aman Ali (born March 27, 1985) is an American comedian, storyteller, journalist, and writer of Indian descent.

== Early life ==
Ali was born on March 27, 1985, and grew up in Reynoldsburg, Ohio, United States within an immigrant Indian Muslim family. He attended Gahanna Lincoln High School. In 2006, he graduated from Kent State University with a degree in Journalism and Mass Communication.

His parents are from India. His father first came to the United States in the 1960s, his mother came to the United States in the 1970s. He has four brothers.

Ali's father went to college in India, majoring in civil engineering intending to design bridges and roads. He came to America to find better opportunities. He moved to Chicago to pursue a degree in civil engineering. He would take classes during the day and work night shifts at the factory. After being offered a manager position and an opportunity to own doughnut stores, with being newly married and a child on the way, his father left school.

== Journalism career ==
Ali started his career as a multimedia producer and reporter in Washington, D.C., for The Hill in the Capitol Hill neighborhood and then worked for Gannett news in New York before writing for Reuters.

He has travelled across the United States covering presidential races, Hurricane Katrina recovery efforts in New Orleans, and hula festivals in Hawaii.

Ali appeared on media outlets such as CNN, HBO, ABC News, and NPR.

Ali has written articles for newspapers and magazines in the greater New York City area. Ali has also made several appearances on CNN, NPR and many other news outlets.

Ali is a talented writer and his published work can be seen throughout this page.

Ali was a Digital Products Specialist for the National Basketball Association.

== Stand-up career ==
In 2007, Ali moved to New York City. He has traveled all over the world and regularly performs shows at comedy clubs, colleges, and theaters all around the United States. He has opened for Dave Chappelle and other acclaimed comedians working in the industry today.

In 2012, he performed in England, Denmark, Belgium and Germany.

== Storytelling ==
Ali is also a storyteller who talks about his upbringing as a 20-something Indian Muslim born and raised in America. His storytelling draws heavily from his upbringing and travels. His jokes cross age, cultural and religious barriers with the intention of bringing people together with his humor.

In 2009, Ali and his friend, Bassam Tariq, a photographer and filmmaker, co-created 30 Mosques in 30 Days, a blog chronicling them visiting a different mosque every day of the 30 days. recording his travels of two Ramadans during which he and his friend visited one mosque a day, telling stories about Muslims in America. In 2010, they changed it to mosques in 30 different states in 30 days. They have been covered by CNN, BBC, PBS and Al Jazeera. In 2011, they visited the other 20 states, including Alaska and Hawaii. and they have travelled over 25,000 miles. In 2012, they also released a series of short films on various facets of Muslim life and spread the message on social media.

== Awards ==
Ali has received several awards for his reporting including one from the Associated Press in 2010 for his breaking news coverage in New York.

== Personal life ==
Aman Ali is an Indian-American who currently lives in New York, New York, United States.

In November 2012, Ali and his mother performed Hajj (the largest Islamic pilgrimage to Mecca, Saudi Arabia).

== See also ==
- Islamic humour
- Indian American
- List of Indian Americans
