= The Boy with the Light-Blue Eyes =

2026 drama film

The Boy With the Light-Blue Eyes
- Greek: Το Αγόρι με τα Γαλάζια Μάτια
- Directed by: Thanasis Neofotistos
- Written by: Thanasis Neofotistos; Grigoris Skarakis
- Produced by: Ioanna Bolomyti; Elizabeth Woodward; Lauren Mann; Miranda Bailey; Yannis Economides; Vladimir Anastasov; Angela Nestorovska; Zvonimir Munivrana; Maja Popovic Milojevic; Irina Malcea-Candea
- Starring: Giorgos Karydis; Pablo Soto; Syrmo Keke; Sofia Filippidou
- Cinematography: Djordje Arambasic
- Edited by: Panagiotis Angelopoulos
- Music by: Igor Vasilev Novogradska
- Production companies: Argonauts Productions; Atalante Production; YE Films; Sektor Film; Studio Corvus; Sense Production; Luna Film; Willa; Cold Iron Pictures; Astrakan Films AB
- Release date: June 4, 2026 (SXSW London)
- Running time: 101 minutes
- Countries: Greece; United States; Cyprus; North Macedonia; Croatia; Serbia; Romania
- Language: Greek

The Boy With the Light-Blue Eyes (Greek: Το Αγόρι με τα Γαλάζια Μάτια) is a 2026 drama film directed by Thanasis Neofotistos in his directorial debut, from a screenplay by Neofotistos and Grigoris Skarakis. It stars Giorgos Karydis, Pablo Soto, Syrmo Keke and Sofia Filippidou.

It had its world premiere at South by Southwest London on June 4, 2026.

== Premise ==
Petros spends his whole life trying to understand why his grandmother and mother make him wear a face mask to hide his eyes. When an elderly man dies in their village after locking eyes with him, Petros finally understands that his eyes carry a curse.

== Cast ==
- Giorgos Karydis as Petros
- Pablo Soto as Aemon
- Syrmo Keke as Lemonia
- Sofia Filippidou as Margarita
- Andreas Zakas
- Konstantina Koutsonasiou
- Mariella Savvides
- Kiriaki Gaspari
- Kaiti Manolidaki
- Magda Lekka
- Yuli Pezopoulou
- Maria Oikonomou
- Nikos Spyropoulos
- Panagiota Dry

== Production ==
In January 2024, it was announced Thanasis Neofotistos would direct the film from a screenplay co-written with Grigoris Skarakis. Principal photography concluded by April 2024.

It previously participated in the CineLink Industry Days, Thessaloniki International Film Festival's Agora program, and Cannes'Focus COPRO.

== Release ==
It had its world premiere at South by Southwest London on June 4, 2026.
