= The Shepherd and the Bear =

2024 internationally co-produced documentary film

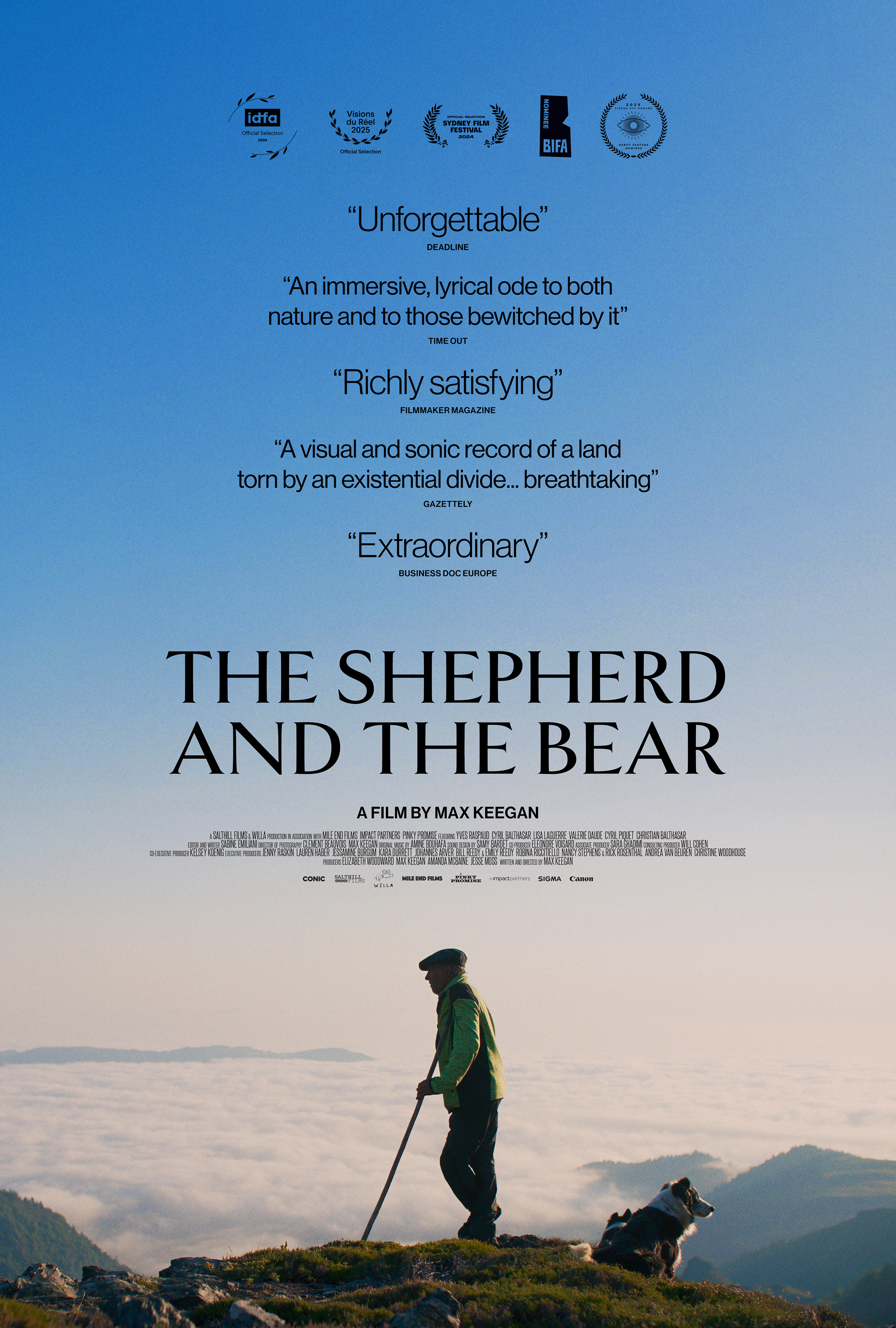
- Official poster
- Directed by: Max Keegan
- Produced by: Max Keegan; Jesse Moss; Amanda McBaine; Elizabeth Woodward
- Cinematography: Max Keegan; Clement Beauvois
- Edited by: Sabine Emiliani
- Music by: Amine Bouhafa
- Production companies: Willa; Salthill Films; Impact Partners; Pinky Promise; Mile End Films
- Distributed by: Willa (United States); Conic (United Kingdom); Jour2Fête (France)
- Release dates: September 15, 2024 (CIFF); February 6, 2026 (United Kingdom); March 13, 2026 (United States)
- Running time: 101 minutes
- Countries: United States; United Kingdom; France
- Language: English

The Shepherd and the Bear is a 2024 internationally co-produced documentary film, directed and produced by Max Keegan. It follows an aging shepherd in the Pyrenees, struggling to find a successor as bears prey on his flock.

It had its world premiere at the Camden International Film Festival on September 15, 2024. It was released in the United Kingdom on February 6, 2026, by Conic, and in the United States on March 13, 2026, by Willa.

== Premise ==
An aging shepherd in the Pyrenees, struggles to find a successor as bears prey on his flock.

== Production ==
Jesse Moss and Amanda McBaine served as producers.

The film received support from the SFFILM Documentary Film Fund.

== Release ==
It had its world premiere at the Camden International Film Festival on September 15, 2024. It also screened at International Documentary Film Festival Amsterdam on November 16, 2024, Shortly after, Jour2Fête acquired French distribution rights to the film. Big Sky Documentary Film Festival on February 21, 2025, Full Frame Documentary Film Festival on April 3, 2025, and Visions du Réel on April 9, 2025. Conic acquired the film for UK and Ireland and released on February 6, 2026 Willa acquired U.S. distribution rights to the film, and released it on March 13, 2026. It began streaming on The Criterion Channel on May 1, 2026.
