= Kumaré =

2011 American documentary film

Kūmāré
- Theatrical release poster
- Directed by: Vikram Gandhi
- Produced by: Bryan Carmel; Brendan Colthurst
- Starring: Vikram Gandhi; Purva Bedi; Kristen Calgaro
- Narrated by: Vikram Gandhi
- Cinematography: Kahlil Hudson; Daniel Leeb (India unit)
- Edited by: Adam Barton; Nathan Russell
- Music by: Alex Kliment; Hisham Bharoocha; Sanjay Khanna
- Production companies: Future Bliss Films; Disposable Television
- Distributed by: Kino Lorber
- Release dates: March 13, 2011 (SXSW); June 20, 2012 (United States)
- Running time: 84 minutes
- Country: United States
- Language: English
- Box office: $132,160

Kūmāré is a 2011 documentary film directed by and starring American filmmaker Vikram Gandhi, who posed for a time as an Indian guru in Phoenix, Arizona, to satirize the American New Age movement.

== Synopsis ==
Vikram Gandhi, the child of observant Hindu immigrants to America, became increasingly skeptical of religion as he grew into adulthood. After noticing the growing popularity of yoga in the United States, he decided to make a documentary about New Age gurus who were referencing the teachings of ancient Indian religions to build credibility for their practices. Finding both these gurus and those in India equally phony, Gandhi decided to impersonate a guru and building a following, intending to eventually reveal his true identity to demonstrate that spiritual leaders are unnecessary, which shifted the focus of the film.

Gandhi transformed himself into "Sri Kumaré", an enlightened guru from the fictional village of Aali'kash, India, by developing a spiritual philosophy centered on the concepts of illusion and self-empowerment. He altered his appearance by growing his hair and beard and adopted a fabricated Indian English accent. Accompanied by a friend and a yoga instructor, he traveled to Phoenix, Arizona, to investigate the local New Age community and established a group of followers. As Gandhi developed relationships with those who embraced his teachings, he became increasingly conflicted about his deception and apprehensive about revealing his true identity. Upon disclosing the truth, his core followers expressed varying degrees of disagreement with his methods, but most continued to support his message and maintained contact with him.

== Reception ==
Kumaré premiered at the 2011 South by Southwest Film Festival (SXSW), where it received the Audience Award for Best Documentary Feature.

The film received fair reviews upon its release. On the review aggregator website Rotten Tomatoes, 60% of 25 critics' reviews are positive. Roger Ebert of the Chicago Sun-Times, in a positive review, it reported that its message is: "It doesn't matter if a religion's teachings are true. What matters is if you think they are."

Many reviewers criticized Gandhi's deception as immoral, although this criticism was often tempered by an acknowledgment that the experiment eventually grew beyond his control. The film is also compared to Sacha Baron Cohen's comedic documentary/mockumentary Borat (2006), in which Cohen similarly posed as the title character in interactions with non-actors.

Kumaré also received academic attention from religious scholars such as Steven E. Lindquist, who reviewed Kumaré for The Journal of Asian Ethnology. While criticizing Gandhi's lack of self-reflection in the film, Lindquist also explains how Kumaré has become a teaching tool for his religious studies classes. This sentiment is also reflected in the work of other scholars who classify Kumaré as "fabulatory", indicating that although much of Gandhi's religion was fabricated, the effects of it are real and can be beneficial.
