= The Lincoln Project (TV series) =

- Genre: Documentary
- Directed by: Karim Amer; Fisher Stevens
- Composer: Osei Essed
- Country of origin: United States
- Original language: English
- No. of episodes: 5

Production
- Executive producers: Karim Amer; Fisher Stevens; Geralyn White Dreyfous; Lyn Davis Lear; Vijay Vaidyanathan; Jamie Wolf; Nina Fialkow; David Fialkow; Vinnie Malhotra
- Producers: Amy Redford; Allison Berg; Alexander Hyde; Mikaela Beardsley; Judy Korin
- Cinematography: Jeff Tomcho; Patrick Ginnetty; Sam Price-Waldman
- Editors: Christopher White; Jason Sager; Karim Lopez; Mona Davis; Zachary Obid; Christopher Dillon; Alex MacKenzie
- Running time: 56-58 minutes
- Production companies: The Othrs; Bloomfish Productions; Impact Partners; Showtime Documentary Films

Original release
- Network: Showtime
- Release: October 7 – November 4, 2022

The Lincoln Project is an American documentary television miniseries revolving around The Lincoln Project, directed by Karim Amer and Fisher Stevens. It consisted of five episodes and premiered on October 7, 2022 on Showtime.

== Plot ==
The series follows The Lincoln Project, a PAC by former and current Republicans, to prevent the re-election of Donald Trump, while working to accomplish their goal, they are shaken by internal upheaval, sexual harassment scandals, and negative press.

== Episodes ==
Overview of The Lincoln Project episodes
No.	Title	Directed by	Original release date	Viewers (millions)
1	"Gunslingers"	Karim Amer; Fisher Stevens	October 7, 2022	n/a
2	"It's COVID, Stupid"	Karim Amer; Fisher Stevens	October 14, 2022 (Note: "It's COVID, Stupid" was released on October 7, 2022 on Showtime's website and on-demand platforms.)	n/a
3	"Eve of Destruction"	Karim Amer; Fisher Stevens	October 21, 2022 (Note: Eve of Destruction was released on October 7, 2022 on Showtime's website and on-demand platforms.)	n/a
4	"Angels with Dirty Faces"	Karim Amer; Fisher Stevens	October 28, 2022 (Note: Angels with Dirty Faces was released on October 7, 2022 on Showtime's website and on-demand platforms.)	n/a
5	"Icarus"	Karim Amer; Fisher Stevens	November 4, 2022 (Note: Icarus was released on October 7, 2022 on Showtime's website and on-demand platforms.)	n/a

== Production ==
Due to the U.S. federal government response to the COVID-19 pandemic, Fisher Stevens wanted to make an advertisement to hold then-president Donald Trump accountable, when he then discovered The Lincoln Project were already doing it.

In October 2020, it was announced Karim Amer and Fisher Stevens would direct a documentary series revolving around The Lincoln Project, produced by Amy Redford. Initially set to be a film, the project turned into a series after turmoil and controversies occurred within the organization.
