= You Resemble Me =

- Theatrical release poster
- Directed by: Dina Amer
- Written by: Dina Amer; Omar Mullick
- Produced by: Elizabeth Woodward; Dina Amer; Karim Amer
- Starring: Lorenza Grimaudo; Ilonna Grimaudo; Mouna Soualem; Sabrina Ouazani; Dina Amer; Alexandre Gonin; Grégoire Colin; Zinedine Soualem
- Cinematography: Omar Mullick
- Edited by: Keiko Deguchi; Jake Roberts
- Music by: Danny Bensi; Saunder Jurriaans
- Production companies: The Othrs; Willa; Vice Studios; RYOT; D'Artaganan; Level Forward; Quiet; Hameda's Stories
- Distributed by: WILLA
- Release dates: September 8, 2021 (Venice); November 4, 2022 (United States)
- Running time: 90 minutes
- Countries: United States; France; Egypt
- Box office: $69,760

You Resemble Me is a 2021 internationally co-produced drama film, directed by Dina Amer in her directorial debut, from a screenplay by Amer and Omar Mullick. It stars Lorenza Grimaudo, Ilonna Grimaudo, Mouna Soualem, Sabrina Ouazani, Dina Amer, Alexandre Gonin, Grégoire Colin and Zinedine Soualem. Spike Lee, Spike Jonze, Riz Ahmed, Alma Har'el, and Claire Denis serve as executive producers on the film.

It had its world premiere at the 78th Venice International Film Festival in the Venice Days section on September 8, 2021. It was released in the United States on November 4, 2022.

== Plot ==
When two sisters are torn apart, the eldest struggles to find her identity.

== Cast ==
- Lorenza Grimaudo as Young Hasna
- Ilonna Grimaudo as Young Mariam
- Mouna Soualem as Adult Hasna
- Sabrina Ouazani as Adult Hasna #2
- Dina Amer as Adult Hasna #3
- Alexandre Gonin as Abdelhamid
- Grégoire Colin as Foster Father
- Zinedine Soualem as Army Officer
- Agnès de Tyssandier as Foster Mother
- Sana Sri as Amina

== Production ==
=== Development ===
Dina Amer worked as a reporter for Vice News and reported on the 2015 Saint-Denis raid, in which it was later found that the police report that Hasna Aït Boulahcen was a suicide bomber was false. Amer felt complicit in spreading the narrative, and wanted to look into her further. Boulachen's family was contacted by multiple journalists, but they chose to speak with Amer, who over the course of several years conducting 360 hours of interviews, with Boulahcen's family and friends, to write the screenplay and make it as accurate as possible. Amer wanted the film not to excuse Boulahcen's choice, but to explore radicalization and how she got there and prevent others from falling into the same traps. Amer walked away from a deal with Amazon Studios in order to maintain her vision, as the studio preferred for the film to be a documentary.

=== Casting ===
For the role of younger Hasna and her sister, Mariam, the process of "street casting" was used to find real-life sisters Lorenza and Illonna Grimaudo. For the role of Hasna, Amer cast three different actresses, including herself, Mouna Soualem and Sabrina Ouazani. In the news and media, Aït Boulahcen was misrepresented, so Amer wanted to show who she could've been and was by using deep fake technology to allow the audience to experience her switching to find connection and belonging.

== Release ==
It had its world premiere at the 78th Venice International Film Festival in the Venice Days section on September 8, 2021. Following the film's debut, the filmmakers did not receive a meaningful offer for distribution, with the only option of taking a deal where they would hand over the rights to the film for 10 years, have minor say in the release, and no prospect of financial return. Some distributors "loved" the film, but were scared to release it due to the subject matter. Instead, they decided to self-distribute the film.

It was released in the Middle East in September 2022, by Front Row Filmed Entertainment. It was released in the United States on November 4, 2022. It was released in the United Kingdom and Ireland on February 3, 2023, by Modern Films. In May 2024, La Vingt-Cinquième Heure acquired French distribution rights to the film, with Claire Denis boarding as an executive producer.

== Awards ==
The film has been well received in international film festivals. It won the Audience Award at the Red Sea Festival. It also won an unprecedented four awards at REC Tarragona, including the CineClub Jury Prize, the Young Jury Prize, and the Audience Award.

== Reception ==
On the review aggregator website Rotten Tomatoes, 94% of 47 critics' reviews are positive, with an average rating of 7.90/10. The website's consensus reads: "A haunting look at the roots of radicalization, You Resemble Me wrings harrowing drama out of its fact-based coming-of-age story." Metacritic, which uses a weighted average, assigned the film a score of 69 out of 100, based on 13 critics, indicating "generally favorable" reviews.
