= A Lien =

2023 American short film

- Festival poster
- Directed by: David Cutler-Kreutz; Sam Cutler-Kreutz
- Written by: Sam Cutler-Kreutz; David Cutler-Kreutz
- Produced by: Tara Sheffer; Rebecca Eskreis; Sam Cutler-Kreutz; David Cutler-Kreutz
- Starring: William Martinez; Victoria Ratermanis; Koralyn Rivera
- Cinematography: Andrea Gavazzi
- Edited by: Caitlin Carr
- Production company: Lefty Films
- Distributed by: Willa
- Release dates: January 23, 2023 (Flickerfest); August 12, 2024 (Online)
- Running time: 15 minutes
- Country: United States
- Language: English

A Lien is a 2023 American short drama film written and directed by David Cutler-Kreutz and Sam Cutler-Kreutz and executive produced by Adam McKay. The film had its world premiere at the Flickerfest on January 23, 2023, in the Best Of International Shorts 3 – 2023 program.

The film received positive reviews and was nominated for Best Live Action Short Film at the 97th Academy Awards.

== Summary ==
Oscar and Sophia Gomez are a married couple with a young daughter, Nina, en route to an immigration interview that they hope will grant Oscar a path to citizenship. Oscar is to be interviewed first regarding their marriage, and he takes Nina with him, leaving Sophia alone in the waiting room. When asked if he has ever returned to his country of origin, Oscar explains to the interviewer that he first came to New York in 1994 and feels no connection to his home country. Meanwhile, in the waiting room, Sophia notices other undocumented immigrants being detained and taken out of the office in handcuffs by ICE. When they begin calling Oscar's name over the loudspeakers, she panics, fearing that they intend to arrest him as well.

After Oscar's interview concludes, Sophia manages to reach him over video-call and explains the situation. Though Oscar is reluctant to leave, she urges him to flee, and he takes Nina with him. However, he is quickly caught by ICE and taken to a van to be deported, along with Nina. Sophia rushes to their aid and manages to intercept them in time with the family's passports, showing that Nina was born on American soil and is a citizen. ICE returns Nina to her, but continues with arresting Oscar. He and Sophia share a tearful goodbye before she takes Nina back home. Nina, oblivious to the crisis, asks her mother to braid her hair, a request she'd given at the beginning of the film. A defeated Sophia obliges.

A textual epilogue reveals that ICE agents continue to intercept undocumented immigrants in immigration offices as they seek citizenship paperwork.

== Cast ==
- William Martinez as Oscar Gomez
- Victoria Ratermanis as Sophia Gomez
- Koralyn Rivera as Nina Gomez
- Jennifer Bergum as USCIS Interviewer

== Release ==
The film had its world premiere at the 32nd Flickerfest on January 23, 2023, in the Best Of International Shorts 3 – 2023 program. The film was showcased in the 30th Austin Film Festival on October 29, 2023, in Shorts Program 5: Survival Instincts. This was followed by screenings at the Seattle International Film Festival in 2024. It was released onto YouTube and Vimeo on August 12, 2024, and was named a Vimeo Staff Pick, as well as being featured on Film Shortage and Short of the Week.

In February 2025, the filmmakers teamed up with the ACLU for a marketing partnership inspired by the themes of the film as part of their Academy Awards campaign.

== Reception ==
=== Critical response ===
Indie Shorts Mag gave the film a rating of 4.1 out of 5 and wrote "A Lien escalates its tension to breaking point and does so with skill. It sums up in fifteen minutes the exhaustion of living under the constant existential threat that is at the core of immigrant life in America. When the tension does break, the numbness is steep and all-pervading, so that going through the motions is all anyone can muster the strength for." Leonard Quart of The Berkshire Edge wrote "The film is shot with consummate skill, avoiding explicit messaging and allowing the action to speak for itself, with the intimate close-ups, long corridors, bare lighting, and editing of the characters’ chaotic movements capturing the intense stress that permeates the situation in which they find themselves ... A Lien is a film that leaves you angry and aware that, with Trump in office, U.S. immigration policy will only get more arbitrary, frightening, and inchoate."

The Cinema Group gave the film 4 and a half stars and wrote "As the Oscars approach, A Lien stands as one of the most vital and affecting nominees in the Live Action Short category. It is not merely a film to be watched — it is a film to be felt, to be sat with, to be grappled with. In a year where conversations around identity, displacement, and systemic power have ever felt more urgent, A Lien is both a warning and a plea: to recognize humanity behind every case number, and to understand the greatest cruelty of bureaucracy is not in its rules, but in its refusal to see the people it governs." Peter Bradshaw of The Guardian named the film his personal favorite of the 2025 Best Live Action Short Oscar nominees, calling it "a film which speaks to modern America." Film Shortage wrote that the film "stands out as a deeply impactful and visually stunning piece of cinema, making it an unmissable entry in this year's awards season."

=== Accolades ===
Award	Date of ceremony	Category	Recipient(s)	Result	Ref.
Austin Film Festival	November 2, 2023	Narrative Short, Film Competition	A Lien	Nominated	
Academy Awards	March 2, 2025	Best Live Action Short Film	David Cutler-Kreutz, Sam Cutler-Kreutz	Nominated	
