= Amanda Lipitz =

American film director

- Born: February 5, 1980 (age 46); Baltimore, Maryland
- Occupations: Director, Producer, former voice actress
- Years active: 2003–present
- Spouse: Greg Smith
- Website: https://www.amandalipitzproductions.com/

Amanda Lipitz is an American director and producer of films and Broadway shows, including the documentary STEP. She's also a former voice actress, best known for voicing Zoey in the English localization of the Japanese anime series Mew Mew Power.

== Life and career ==
Lipitz was born in Baltimore, Maryland, to Brenda Rever and Roger Lipitz. After graduating from the Park School of Baltimore, she studied at New York University's Tisch School of the Arts, where she earned a BFA in theatre in 2002. After graduating, she did voice acting for 4Kids Entertainment under the name "Amanda Brown," most notably as Zoey in Mew Mew Power, an English localization of the Japanese anime series Tokyo Mew Mew. Lipitz is the founder of Amanda Lipitz Productions, under which she has produced Broadway shows and directed and produced short films for non-profit organizations.

=== Broadway ===
After graduating from New York University, Lipitz began producing New York theatre. At age 24, she made her Broadway debut as a producer with Dirty Rotten Scoundrels in 2005. She produced Legally Blonde: The Musical, which opened on Broadway in 2007. She served as executive producer and creator of MTV's series Legally Blonde: The Musical – The Search for Elle Woods.

Lipitz' Broadway credits include the Tony Award-winning productions of A View from the Bridge in 2015 and The Humans in 2016.

=== Off-Broadway ===
In 2015, she served as lead producer for Brooklynite, a musical by Peter Lerman, inspired by the Brooklyn Superhero Supply Company.

=== Non-profit filmmaking ===
Lipitz has made more than 30 short-form documentaries for organizations which include Young Women's Leadership Network, Citymeals-on-Wheels, College Bound Initiative, The Tory Burch Foundation, Barnard College, Turnaround for Children, and The Gateway School. These documentaries serve as fundraising material, and document the works of each organization.

=== Film ===
Lipitz' directed the feature-length film STEP, which won an award at the Sundance Film Festival. The subjects of the film, the "Lethal Ladies of BLSYW", attend the Baltimore Leadership School for Young Women, a school Lipitz had been an active supporter of since its inception in 2009. The film was released theatrically by Fox Searchlight Pictures in 2017.

In 2017, Lipitz was featured on The Hollywood Reporter's Documentary Filmmaker Roundtable, alongside Evgeny Afineevsky, Greg Barker, Yance Ford, Matthew Heineman, Brett Morgen and Peter Nicks, where she said "...we have a very different responsibility than 20 years ago. It's an incredible time to make documentaries because millions and millions of people see these movies now."

In 2021, Lipitz second documentary Found was released on Netflix, following three teenage girls who found out they are blood-related cousins on 23andMe.

Lipitz agreed to direct the English-language remake of the Spanish film, Instructions Not Included.

=== Podcasts ===
Lipitz co-created and directed Motherhacker, a scripted podcast with Gimlet Media and Spotify starring Carrie Coon. The first season of Motherhacker was released in 2019, and the second season in 2021.

== Awards and nominations ==
- Winner of Sundance Film Festival Special Jury Prize for Inspirational Filmmaking, Step (2017)
- Nominee for Sundance Film Festival Grand Jury Prize, Step (2017)
- Nominee for the Stockholm Film Festival Bronze Horse for Best Documentary, Step (2017)
- Winner of AFI Docs Festival Audience Award for Feature Documentary, Step (2017)
- Winner of Black Reel Award for Outstanding Documentary Feature, Step (2017)
- Nominee for Cinema Eye Audience Choice Prize, Step (2017)
- Winner of Cinetopia Film Festival Audience Award for Documentary, Step (2017)
- Nominee for Critics Choice Award, Best First Documentary, Step (2017)
- Winner of Film Club's Lost Weekend Award for Best Documentary, Step (2017)
- Nominee for Hot Docs Canadian Int'l Documentary Festival Audience Award, Step (2017)
- Nominee for Melbourne International Film Festival People's Choice Award for Best Documentary, Step (2017)
- Nominee for Seattle Film Critics Award for Best Documentary, Step (2017)
- Winner of Seattle International Film Festival Women in Cinema Lena Sharpe Award, Step (2017)
- Nominee for Seattle International Film Festival Futurewave Youth Jury Award, Step (2017)
- Nominee for Seattle International Film Festival Golden Space Needle Award, Step (2017)

== Voice acting credits ==
- Magical DoReMi – Belinda Higgins (Nobuko Yokokawa)
- Mew Mew Power (4Kids dub) – Zoey Hanson/Mew Zoey (Ichigo Momomiya/Mew Strawberry) and Mrs. Hanson
- Teenage Mutant Ninja Turtles: Fast Forward – Starlee Hambrath

== Productions ==
=== On Broadway ===
- Dirty Rotten Scoundrels, 2005
- Legally Blonde: The Musical, 2007
- The Performers, 2012
- A View from the Bridge, 2015
- The Humans, 2016

=== Stage productions ===
- Brooklynite, Vineyard Theatre, 2015

=== Film/TV ===
- Legally Blonde: The Musical – The Search for Elle Woods, 2008
- STEP, 2017
- Found, 2021
