= The Man Will Burn =

American documentary series

- Genre: Documentary
- Directed by: Jehane Noujaim; Vikram Gandhi
- Music by: Tori Letzler; Steven Richard Davis
- Country of origin: United States
- Original language: English
- No. of episodes: 4

Production
- Executive producers: Jehane Noujaim; Vikram Gandhi; Nushin Sabet; Farhad Mohit; Karim Amer; Lyn Lear; Kristin Ólafsdóttir; Thor Björgólfsson; Nina Fialkow; David Fialkow; Geralyn Dreyfous; Dana O'Keefe; Yariv Milchan; Teddy Schwarzman; Michael Heimler; Natalie Lehmann; Emily Selinger; Nancy Abraham; Lisa Heller; Sara Rodriguez
- Producers: Muriel Soenens; Catie Bolt; Eric Forman; Paul McGuire; Jillian Li
- Cinematography: Benji Lanpher; Chris Darnell; Consuelo Althouse; Natalie Sim; Sam Price-Waldman
- Editors: Raúl Santos; Karim Fanous; Kim Hall; Austin Reedy; Kevin Chapados; Evan Wise
- Running time: 57-59 minutes
- Production companies: HBO Documentary Films; Double Agent; Noujaim Films; The Othrs

Original release
- Network: HBO
- Release: July 9 – July 30, 2026

The Man Will Burn is a 2026 American documentary series directed and produced by Jehane Noujaim and Vikram Gandhi, exploring the history of Burning Man. With access to the Burning Man Project leadership and archives, the series examines the culture of social experimentation as well as consecutive years of unprecedented crises.

Following a world premiere at the Tribeca Festival in June, HBO broadcast the series from July 9 to July 30, 2026.

== Episodes ==
No.	Title	Directed by	Original release date	U.S. viewers (millions)
1	"The Great Unknown"	Jehane Noujaim; Vikram Gandhi	July 9, 2026	N/A
Originating with Larry Harvey in the 1980s, the Burning Man movement steadily matured into a broad community of creative collaboration. Dilemmas plague the 2021 organizers facing the COVID pandemic.
2	"Welcome to the Shit Show"	Jehane Noujaim; Vikram Gandhi	July 16, 2026	N/A
The neighboring community of Gerlach, Nevada has evolved with the annual Burning Man festival. The dangerous events of 1996 contrast with the renegade Free Burn in 2021.
3	"Waking Dreams"	Jehane Noujaim; Vikram Gandhi	July 23, 2026	N/A
Events of the 2022 Burn unfold, with perspectives from organizers, veteran Burners, new artists, and sound car crews. Amidst the gentrification of Black Rock City, new attendees face personal concerns ranging from reclusiveness to PTSD.
4	"Mud Burn"	Jehane Noujaim; Vikram Gandhi	July 30, 2026	N/A
Significant rains in 2023 transform the playa into a muddy mess, closing down Black Rock City for days and delaying the Man being burned. The annual Temple installation offers shared space for contemplation and personal remembrances, with messages and objects burned on the final night of the event.

== Production ==
Directors and executive producers Jehane Noujaim and Vikram Gandhi announced their documentary series revolving around Burning Man in September 2023, with principal photography having commenced in 2021. Double Agent financed the series, with no network attached yet. HBO later boarded the series.

== Release ==
The series had its world premiere June 9, 2026 at Tribeca Festival; episodes also screened June 14 at Sheffield DocFest. HBO launched the series broadcast on July 9, 2026.

== Reception ==
On the review aggregator website Rotten Tomatoes, the series holds an approval rating of 67%, based on 6 reviews. On Metacritic, it has a weighted average score of 64 out of 100 based on 5 reviews.

John Anderson of The Wall Street Journal wrote: "Noujaim and Gandhi are not out to critique Burning Man, or to celebrate it either. The lushness of the cinematography, with its beautiful people, landscapes, improbable sculptures, impractical machines and galaxy of light and dust, is as voluptuous as the festival itself". Joel Keller of Decider suggested viewing the series writing: "An effective overview of Burning Man, a festival that’s misunderstood by many, while examining how its spirit of creativity and community struggles against the reality of the 2020s."

Daniel Fienberg of The Hollywood Reporter was critical of the series writing: "There’s an edit of The Man Will Burn that would be shorter, tighter and perhaps more sensationalistic, and one that would be longer, richer and more complex, but instead we get an in-between series that’s fun, shallow and, finally, bland in a way Burning Man has always tried to avoid becoming." Keith A. Spencer of Jacobin wrote that the series "doesn't have the patina of evenhanded, independent journalism", noting that the Burning Man Project permitted and promoted the series.

== Accolades ==
Award	Date	Category	Recipient(s)	Result	Ref.
Critics' Choice Documentary Awards	November 8, 2026	Best Limited Documentary Series	The Man Will Burn	Nominated	
Cinema Eye Honors	January 11, 2027	Outstanding Broadcast Cinematography	Benji Lanpher, Consuelo Althouse and Natalie Sim	Pending	
