= Lachlan Cartwright =

Australian journalist

Australian
- Occupation: Journalist

Lachlan Cartwright is an Australian former executive editor of National Enquirer and a special correspondent for The Hollywood Reporter.

Cartwright is followed in the film My NDA along with two other individuals exposing how non-disclosure agreements in employment contracts are weaponized.
