= Willa (company) =

American film production and distribution company

- Type: Private
- Industry: Film industry
- Founded: 2017; 9 years ago
- Founder: Elizabeth Woodward
- Headquarters: New York, New York, U.S.
- Area served: United States
- Website: willa.org

Willa (stylized in all caps) is an American independent film production and distribution company founded in 2017 by Elizabeth Woodward. The company has produced and distributed You Resemble Me (2021), Another Body (2023), La cocina (2024), and The Voice of Hind Rajab (2025).

== History ==
In 2021, Willa produced You Resemble Me, directed by Dina Amer and executive-produced by Spike Lee, Spike Jonze, Alma Har'el, Riz Ahmed and Claire Denis. Willa moved into distribution after the film failed to receive a meaningful distribution offer and passes due to its subject matter.

In 2023, Willa produced and co-distributed Another Body with Utopia, a documentary revolving around a college student finding deepfake pornography of herself online.

Additionally, Willa has produced the short films Everything Wrong and Nowhere to Go for PBS, Merci Poppy and F*ck That Guy directed by Hanna Gray Organschi. In 2025, Willa acquired the short film A Lien for distribution following its nomination for the Academy Award for Best Live Action Short Film.

== Filmography ==
=== 2020s ===
Release date	Title	Notes
November 4, 2022	You Resemble Me	
October 20, 2023	Another Body	co-distribution with Utopia
October 25, 2024	La cocina	
June 20, 2025	The Queen of My Dreams	co-distribution with Product of Culture
July 18, 2025	No Sleep Till	distributed by Factory 25
October 10, 2025	Fairyland	co-distribution with Lionsgate
December 17, 2025	The Voice of Hind Rajab	
March 13, 2026	The Shepherd and the Bear	
August 7, 2026	The Fence	produced by; distributed by AMC+
September 23, 2026	Take Me Home	

=== Upcoming ===
Release date	Title	Notes
TBA	The Boy With the Light-Blue Eyes	
TBA	My NDA	
TBA	Rubber Hut	
