= Andy Señor Jr. =

American actor

Andy Señor Jr
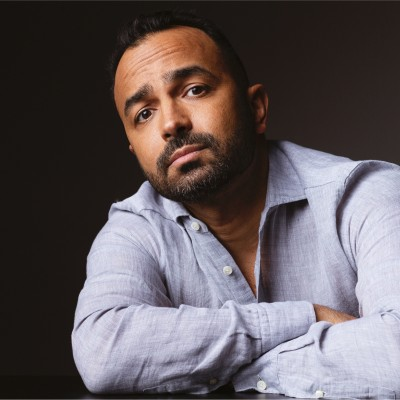
- Born: Andres Señor Jr. September 20, 1974 (age 51); Miami, Florida, U.S.
- Education: Florida International University
- Occupations: Actor; Director; Filmmaker
- Years active: 1997-present
- Website: https://www.andysenorjr.com

Andres "Andy" Señor Jr. (born September 20, 1974 in Miami, Florida) is an American actor, stage director and filmmaker.

== Early life and education ==
Andy Señor Jr. was born and raised in Miami, Florida. His parents, both Cuban exiles, worked in the Latin American music industry. They often hosted gatherings at their family house, where musicians, including Gloria Estefan and Jon Secada, would perform. These familial connections would come full circle when, in 2015, Señor served as the associate director on the Broadway production of Gloria Estefan's musical, On Your Feet!

Señor studied Theater at Florida International University, graduating in 1997. In 2015, the university honored him with a Torch Award, noting him as a distinguished alum.

== Career ==
He made his professional debut in the Tony Award-winning musical RENT as "Angel," playing the role on the stages of Broadway, London, Asia, Los Angeles and US National Tours. Some film and television credits include: Dummy, Lola, Ed (NBC) and appearances on Regis and Kelly, The Rosie O'Donnell Show, and as a presenter on the Latin Billboard Music Awards Andy also voiced the role of Rembrandt in the 2005 game The Warriors.

Most notably, Señor directed and produced the historic production of Rent in Havana, Cuba in 2014, marking the first Broadway musical co-production between the United States and the Cuba in 50 years. His documentary Revolution Rent premiered 2019 at DOC NYC, KeyWest Film Festival & Miami International Film Festival and it was released on June 15, 2021, by HBO.

== Work ==
=== Film ===
Year	Title	Role	Details	Note
2019	Revolution Rent	Co-Director	HBO	HBO Documentary Films DOC NYC Film Festival, Key West Film Festival, Miami International Film Festival
2021	NYTW Gala Rent 25th Anniversary	Director	New York Theatre Workshop	Worldwide Streaming for NYTW

=== Theatre ===
Year	Title	Role	Details	Notes
2020	Fly	Associate Director	La Jolla Playhouse	
2013	Fly	Associate Director	Dallas Theater Center	
2015	On Your Feet!	Associate Director	Broadway	
2016–2019	On Your Feet!	Restaging Director	US Tour, Netherlands, London West	
1997–2005	Rent	Ángel	Broadway, London West End, National US Tours, 10th Anniversary Asia Tour	
2011	Rent	Associate Director	Off Broadway revival	
2012–2020	Rent	Restaging Director	Japan, Cuba, South Korea	
2016	Holiday Inn	Associate Director	Broadway	
2016	Farhad or the Secret of Being	Director	MDCA Auditorium	Nilo Cruz Playwright
2013	Viva Broadway!	Conceiver/Performer	MDCAC	Co-production with Bring it Home Miami
