= Grass Is Greener =

- Title card
- Directed by: Fab Five Freddy
- Starring: Snoop Dogg; B-Real
- Distributed by: Netflix
- Release date: April 20, 2019
- Running time: 1 hour, 37 minutes
- Country: U.S.
- Language: English

Grass Is Greener is a documentary film about cannabis, which premiered on Netflix on April 20, 2019.

== Content ==
Grass Is Greener follows hip hop legend Fab Five Freddy as he uncovers the history of cannabis prohibition in the United States. He interviews many other popular artists, such as Snoop Dogg and B-Real from Cypress Hill, as well as attorneys, influencers, and people who were personally affected by drug convictions.

The timeline starts in the 1920s jazz era where Duke Ellington, Louis Armstrong, and Billie Holiday were all targets under racist policies; and moves into the modern era where cannabis is a booming industry with an uncertain future.

== See also ==
- List of original films distributed by Netflix
