= Bassam Tariq =

American film director

- Tariq in 2026
- Born: October 22, 1986 (age 40); Karachi, Sindh, Pakistan
- Education: University of Texas at Austin (B.S., 2008)
- Occupations: Film director; film producer; screenwriter

Bassam Tariq (born October 22, 1986) is a Pakistani filmmaker. He co-directed and produced the Sundance-funded documentary These Birds Walk (2013) with Omar Mullick, and he was named in Filmmaker's "25 New Faces of Independent Film" in 2012. He made his feature film debut with Mogul Mowgli (2020). His second feature film, Your Mother Your Mother Your Mother, opened on October 2, 2026.

Tariq's works aim to uncover the diversity of Muslim life and experience. In addition to filmmaking, his diverse projects include blogging and writing, co-founding a halal butcher shop, and being a TED fellow.

== Early life and education ==
Tariq a Memon was born in Pakistan and moved to the U.S. with his family at a young age. He grew up in New York's Astoria neighborhood and moved to Houston at age 11.

Tariq received a Bachelor of Science (BS) in advertising from the University of Texas at Austin in 2008. While in college, Tariq took a class called “Creativity in American Culture” that inspired him to start making films, which at first were corporate videos. He free-lanced and filmed promotional videos for Celestica, The University of Texas at Austin, and CBS News 11.

== Career ==
Tariq started filmmaking in college to earn extra money while getting his degree. He has also produced feature video stories for Time, a short film for The New Yorker, and co-directed a PSA to encourage vaccination against polio in Pakistan.

He moved to New York again after college and worked in advertising as a copywriter at Saatchi & Saatchi. He also worked as copywriter at other agencies, including RAPP and BBDO NY.

In 2009, Tariq and his friend Aman Ali started a blogging project called 30 Mosques in 30 Days. During Ramadan, Tariq and Ali broke their fast at different mosques around New York each night of Ramadan. They shared their stories on a Tumblr blog.

During the second year of the project, the men decided to visit 30 mosques in 30 different states during Ramadan, and they continued the tour of mosques around the country the following year. As they explored the different communities of each mosque, Tariq and Ali wrote about the diversity of America's Muslim population and the themes that affect the Muslim community as a whole. The blog has gotten extensive press coverage, and the response has been largely positive. The Huffington Post called the project "visually stunning," and more communities around the world have participated in a 30 mosques project.

In 2013, Tariq co-directed These Birds Walk with Omar Mullick. The film is his first feature-length documentary and follows street children in Pakistan.

When Tariq moved back to New York, he read about a humanitarian in Pakistan named Abdul Sattar Edhi, who started the first ambulance system in Pakistan in the 1950s and founded the Edhi Foundation. Tariq and Mullick wanted to make a film about him, but Edhi urged them to focus on the work his foundation does. As a result, the film follows a young runaway boy, Omar, who lives in a home for runaways that Edhi runs.

The Sundance-funded These Birds Walk premiered at South by Southwest 2013 and opened in theaters across the US in November 2013. The film explores the struggles of street children in Karachi, Pakistan who are living the Edhi Foundation, a non-profit social welfare program, and the sympathetic but reluctant ambulance driver who has to take them back to the homes they've run away from.

The Sundance Institute awarded Tariq and Mullick the Art of Nonfiction fellowship January 2016. The Art of Nonfiction initiative expands the institute's support for documentaries that explore contemporary social issues.

By July 2021, Tariq was in final talks to direct the film Blade starring Mahershala Ali for Marvel Studios, and was hired by September 2021. However, on September 28, 2022, Tariq stepped down as director due to further delays in the production schedule but remained on the project as an executive producer.

Tariq later reunited with Ali to create the action-thriller Your Mother Your Mother Your Mother.

== Other ventures ==
In 2014, Tariq co-founded a halal butcher shop in the East Village in New York with Khalid Latif and Russell Khan. The shop, Honest Chops, was initially started because of the founders' frustration with the lack of halal meat options in New York City. The butcher shop sources organic, humanely-raised animals from the Tri-State area and attempts to make the product accessible and affordable. A portion of the profits goes toward building social services and institutions in New York City. The shop also distributes meat to soup kitchens, food pantries and families in need around major holidays.

Tariq is also a TED Fellow. In October 2014, he hosted a TED Talk titled "The beauty and diversity of Muslim life." The talk explores how his eclectic career reflects his perspective on what it means to be Muslim, and he relates his disparate professions as a response to the complicated history that America has with diversity and people who oversimplify Muslim beliefs and communities.

Tariq is also a freelance copywriter and creative director in New York City.

== Personal life ==
Tariq is married with a son.

== Filmography ==
=== Film ===
==== Feature films ====
Year	Title	Director	Writer
2020	Mogul Mowgli	Yes	Yes
2026	Your Mother Your Mother Your Mother	Yes	Yes

==== Short films ====
Year	Title	Director	Producer	Writer	Notes
2018	Red Mountain Choir	Yes	No	No	
2018	Wa'ad	Yes	No	Yes	Also editor
2018	Mogambo	Yes	No	No	also cinematographer

=== Television ===
Year	Title	Notes
2026	Bait	3 episodes

=== Documentary works ===
Year	Title	Director	Producer	Writer	Notes
2013	These Birds Walk	Yes	Yes	No	Also editor
2017	Abstract: The Art of Design	Partial	Partial	No	Segment director; Episode "Isle Crawford: Interior Design"
2017	11/8/16	Partial	Partial	No	Segment producer and director; also cinematographer
2019	Ghosts of Sugar Land	Yes	Yes	Yes	Documentary short
