= No Sleep Till =

- Theatrical release poster
- Directed by: Alexandra Simpson
- Written by: Alexandra Simpson
- Produced by: Alexandra Simpson; Tyler Taormina; Elijah Graf Quartier; Jason Simpson
- Starring: Jordan Coley; Xavier Brown Sanders; Brynne Hofbauer; Taylor Benton
- Cinematography: Sylvain Marco Froidevaux
- Edited by: Alexandra Simpson
- Production companies: Omnes Films; ROC Films; Willa; Salem Street Entertainment
- Distributed by: Factory 25
- Release dates: September 2, 2024 (Venice); July 18, 2025 (United States)
- Running time: 93 minutes
- Countries: United States; Switzerland
- Language: English

No Sleep Till is a 2024 Swiss-American drama film, written, directed, produced, and edited by Alexandra Simpson in her feature directorial debut. It stars Jordan Coley, Xavier Brown Sanders, Brynne Hofbauer and Taylor Benton.

It had its world premiere at the 81st Venice International Film Festival on September 2, 2024, in the International Critics Week section, where it got Special Mention from jury. It was released in the United States on July 18, 2025, by Factory 25.

== Premise ==
When a Florida town is threatened by a hurricane, locals prepare to evacuate. A few remain, including a storm chaser, a teenager, and two friends in pursuit of their dream gig.

== Cast ==
- Jordan Coley as Will
- Xavier Brown Sanders as Mike
- Brynne Hofbauer as June
- Taylor Benton as Taylor

== Production ==
Principal photography began in September 2023, in Atlantic Beach, Florida. Additional financing was crowdfunded using Indiegogo.

== Release ==
It had its world premiere at the 81st Venice International Film Festival in the International Critics Week section on September 2, 2024. It also screened at the Los Angeles Festival of Movies on April 6, 2025, and New Directors/New Films Festival on April 9, 2025. It was released in the United States on July 18, 2025.

== Reception ==
=== Critical reception ===
On the review aggregator website Rotten Tomatoes, 100% of 10 critics' reviews are positive. Metacritic, which uses a weighted average, assigned the film a score of 70 out of 100, based on 6 critics, indicating "generally favorable" reviews.

== Accolades ==
Award	Date of ceremony	Category	Recipient(s)	Result	Ref.
Venice Film Festival	7 September 2024	Venice International Critics' Week – Grand Prize	Alexandra Simpson	Nominated	
Venice Film Festival	7 September 2024	Venice International Critics' Week – Jury Special Mention	Alexandra Simpson	Won	
