= Immigration Nation =

2020 documentary television miniseries

- Genre: Documentary
- Directed by: Christina Clusiau; Shaul Schwarz
- Country of origin: United States
- Original languages: English; Spanish
- No. of seasons: 1
- No. of episodes: 6

Production
- Running time: 60–64 minutes
- Production company: Reel Peak Films

Original release
- Network: Netflix
- Release: August 3, 2020

Immigration Nation is a 2020 documentary television miniseries directed by Christina Clusiau and Shaul Schwarz. The series consists of footage filmed from 2017 to 2020 of the U.S. Immigration and Customs Enforcement (ICE) agency's work during the Trump era.

The documentary has been described by at least one film reviewer as "showing the inhumanity and unconscionable cruelty of [the] agency's tactics."

Prior to release, filmmakers were faced with legal threats; ICE sought to delay the release until after the 2020 United States elections.

== Release ==
Immigration Nation was released on August 3, 2020, on Netflix.

== Reception ==
Review aggregator Rotten Tomatoes reported an approval rating of 100% based on 17 reviews, with an average rating of 7.96/10 for the miniseries. The website's critical consensus reads, "A rare and expansive look into the consequences of unfettered power, Immigration Nation is a powerful, harrowing indictment of the current state of American immigration." Metacritic gave the miniseries a weighted average score of 86 out of 100 based on 11 reviews, indicating "universal acclaim".

Daniel Fienberg of The Hollywood Reporter described the series as "Not an easy watch, but often essential" and wrote: "As in-depth and widely-encompassing as it is, Immigration Nation feels barely like the tip of a horrible iceberg." John Anderson of the Wall Street Journal, called the series: "a strictly observational series, so there are no explanatory titles or voiceovers. But the filmmakers do know how to juxtapose their material in ways that make unmistakable points." Caroline Framke at Variety gave a review stating that the series "provides a damning indictment of the labyrinth systems that make ICE so powerful, and a wrenching examination of the human cost its policies have wrought."

In an article published in The New York Times, on July 23, 2020, Caitlin Dickerson reports that Jenny L. Burke, the press secretary for ICE, stated that the agency is "shocked by the mischaracterizations made by the production company," and "wholeheartedly disputes the allegations brought forward by filmmakers of this production."

== Episodes ==
No.	Title	Directed by	Original release date
1	"Installing Fear"	Shaul Schwarz and Christina Clusiau	August 3, 2020
2	"Maintaining Vigilance"	Unknown	August 3, 2020
3	"Power of the Vote"	Unknown	August 3, 2020
4	"The New Normal"	Unknown	August 3, 2020
5	"The Right Way"	Unknown	August 3, 2020
6	"Prevention Through Deterrence"	Unknown	August 3, 2020
