= Step (film) =

- Theatrical release poster
- Directed by: Amanda Lipitz
- Produced by: Amanda Lipitz; Steven Cantor
- Starring: Blessin Giraldo; Cori Grainger; Tayla Solomon; Gari McIntyre; Paula Dofat
- Cinematography: Casey Regan
- Edited by: Penelope Falk
- Music by: Laura Karpman; Raphael Saadiq
- Production company: Stick Figure Productions
- Distributed by: Fox Searchlight Pictures
- Release dates: January 21, 2017 (Sundance); August 4, 2017 (United States)
- Running time: 83 minutes
- Country: United States
- Language: English
- Box office: $1.2 million

Step (sometimes stylized STEP) is a 2017 American documentary film directed by Amanda Lipitz, focusing on a girls' Baltimore high school dance team. It won the U.S. Documentary Special Jury Award for Inspirational Filmmaking at the 2017 Sundance Film Festival and the Audience Award for Best Feature at the 2017 AFI Docs Festival. It was released in theaters on August 4, 2017.

== Story ==
Step is the true-life story of a girls’ high-school step team set against the background of the heart of Baltimore. These young women learn to laugh, love and thrive – on and off the stage – even when the world seems to work against them. Empowered by their teachers, teammates, counselors, coaches and families, they chase their ultimate dreams: to win a step championship and to be accepted into college. This all female school is reshaping the futures of its students’ lives by making it their goal to have every member of their senior class accepted to and graduate from college, many of whom will be the first in their family to do so.

== Cast ==
- Blessin Giraldo
- Cori Grainger
- Tayla Solomon
- Gari McIntyre
- Paula Dofat

== Release ==
The film premiered at the 2017 Sundance Film Festival and was released in the United States on August 4, 2017. The film made $145,000 from 29 theaters in its opening weekend, and then $185,000 from 278 theaters in its second.

=== Critical response ===
On Rotten Tomatoes, the film has an approval rating of 96% based on 102 reviews, with an average rating of 7.8/10. The site's critical consensus reads, "Step tells an irresistibly crowd-pleasing story in a thoroughly absorbing way -- and while smartly incorporating a variety of timely themes." On Metacritic, the film has a weighted average score of 81 out of 100, based on 27 critics, indicating "universal acclaim". Audiences polled by CinemaScore gave the film an average grade of "A" on an A+ to F scale.

Ann Hornaday of The Washington Post remarks that the film "...fires on every cylinder, investing viewers in personal stories that couldn’t have higher stakes and inviting them on a journey that pays off in ways expected and utterly surprising."
