= Jenny Raskin =

American film producer

Jennifer Raskin (November 24, 1969) is a film and television producer and director.

Raskin produced episodes of "Dogtown," "Independent Lens," "Making Grace," "Critical Hour" and "Lifeline" She also co-directed, with Liz Mermin, the controversial film On Hostile Ground which was about the abortion debate.

She lives in New York, is married and has two children. Raskin is the granddaughter of the portrait artist Peter S. Pezzati.

== Awards and honors ==
- 2021: One of the producers for Nuclear Family documentary which was nominated for a 2021 Peabody Award.
