= Charles Anthony Fager =

Neurosurgeon in the United States

- Born: January 16, 1924; Nassau, Bahama,
- Died: April 8, 2014 (aged 90)
- Education: Wagner College; SUNY Downstate Medical Center
- Occupation: Neurosurgeon
- Known for: Neurosurgeon

Charles Anthony Fager (January 16, 1924 - April 8, 2014) was an American neurosurgeon, medical academic, and leader at the Lahey Hospital & Medical Center.

== Early life and education ==
Born in Nassau, Bahamas, he was raised in Brooklyn. Fager graduated from Wagner College and SUNY Downstate Medical Center (M.D., 1946). His did both his internship (1946–47) and residency in general surgery (1947–48) at Upstate Medical Center. That was followed by a residency in neurosurgery at Cushing VA Hospital, Framingham, Massachusetts (1950–52), and a fellowship in neurosurgery at Lahey Clinic (1952–53).

== Career ==
Following the completion of his fellowship, he joined the neurosurgery department at Lahey Hospital & Medical Center, where he spent the remainder of his career, over the years serving as chair of the Department of Neurosurgery, vice chair of the Board of Governors, member of the Lahey Clinic Foundation Board of Trustees, chair of the Medical Practice Council, and chair of the Division of Surgery.

A faculty member at Harvard Medical School, he wrote a widely used textbook, the Atlas of Spine Surgery.

His many publications concerned the appropriate selection of patients and the proper indications and operations for surgery. These focused on the importance of posterior and posterolateral operations for cervical disc lesions. He spoke regularly at postgraduate courses and seminars, and wrote chapters in textbooks on these subjects.

== Accomplishments and awards ==
Fager was a member of the American Medical Association; the Massachusetts Medical Society; the New England Neurosurgical Society (past-President); the Boston Society of Neurology and Psychiatry (past-President); the American Association of Neurological Surgeons(AANS) and the Congress of Neurological Surgeons{CNS}, American College of Surgeons (past-Chairman, Advisory Council for Neurosurgery; chairman, Advisory Council Chairman); the Neurosurgical Society of America (past-President); the Boston Surgical Society; the Argentine Neurosurgical Association; and the Venezuelan Society of Neurosurgery

Fager received the Dudley Award in Medicine from New York State University Downstate Medical Center and the Lifetime achievement Award from the Joint Section on Disorders of the Spine of the AANS & CNS in 1992. He was a member of the American Board of Neurological Surgery from 1976 to 1983. He gave a number of guest lectures, the Teachenor Memorial, The Balado Memorial and the Gardner Lectures, among them. In 2000, he received the Gold Medal of the Neurological Society of America.

== Notable cases ==
In 1959, Fager treated Ted Williams for a pinched nerve.

In 1965, Fager saved the life of John A. Nerud, a horse trainer who had a blood clot on his brain. Profoundly thankful, Nerud named a horse after Fager, who soon became a fan of horseracing. The horse, Dr. Fager, was a record-setter, horse of the year in 1968, and the only horse to win four championships in a single year.

== Notable publications ==
- Fager, CA; Poppen, JL (1960). "Intracranial Aneurysms Results of Surgical Treatment". Journal of Neurosurgery. 17 (2): 283–296. doi:10.3171/jns.1960.17.2.0283. PMID 14434182.
- Fager, CA; Carter, H (1966). "Intrasellar Epithelial Cysts". Journal of Neurosurgery. 24 (1): 77–81. doi:10.3171/jns.1966.24.1.0077. PMID 5903300.
- "Results of adequate posterior decompression in the relief of spondylotic cervical myelopathy". Journal of Neurosurgery. 38 (6): 684–692. 1973. doi:10.3171/jns.1973.38.6.0684. PMID 4710650.
- Fager, CA (1977). "Management of Cervical Disc Lesions And Spondylosis by Posterior Approaches". Neurosurgery. 24 (CN_suppl_1): 488–507. doi:10.1093/neurosurgery/24.CN_suppl_1.488. PMID 583694.
- Fager, CA; Freidberg, SR (1980). "Analysis of failures and poor results of lumbar spine surgery". Spine. 5 (1): 87–94. doi:10.1097/00007632-198001000-00015. PMID 7361201. S2CID 45885789.
- Atlas of spinal surgery. Vol. 17. Philadelphia: Lea & Febiger. 1989. ISBN 9780812111729.
- Quality of the Issue: Memoirs and Perspectives of a Neurosurgeon. Vantage Press. 2001. ISBN 978-0533139545.
- A Hole in the Wind : The Story of a Man and His Horse. Jay Street Publishers. 2004. ISBN 978-1889534930.
- Stop talking to the jury: stories of a medical witness. Jay Street Publishers. 2004. ISBN 978-1889534121.
