= Dina Amer =

Egyptian-American director, writer, producer, and journalist

- Occupations: Director, writer, producer, journalist, actress
- Years active: 2011–present

Dina Amer is an Egyptian-American film director, writer, producer, and journalist.

== Biography ==
Amer was born and raised in the United States.

Amer's work has been published by The New York Times, CNN, and VICE. In 2011, she received the Kahlil Gibran Spirit of Humanity Award from the Arab American Institute Foundation (AAIF) for her reporting of the Arab Spring in Egypt. In 2016, she reported on the human trafficking of refugees of the Syrian civil war and the underground economy of the illegal Egypt–Gaza barrier for Vice News program Black Market: Dispatches.

Amer's debut feature film, You Resemble Me, premiered at the 78th Venice International Film Festival. For her screenplay Cain and Abel, which she co-wrote with Omar Mullick, she was invited to the Sundance Screenwriters' Lab in January 2022.

== Filmography ==
Year	Title	Contribution	Note
2013	The Square	Actress	Documentary
2021	You Resemble Me	Director, writer, producer and actress	Feature film

== Awards and nominations ==
Year	Result	Award	Category	Work	Ref.
2021	Nominated	São Paulo International Film Festival	Best Film	You Resemble Me	
2021	Nominated	Venice Film Festival	Giornate degli Autori	You Resemble Me	
2021	Won	Red Sea International Film Festival	Audience Award	You Resemble Me	
2022	Won	International Federation of Film Critics	Best International Film	You Resemble Me	
