= 11th Critics' Choice Documentary Awards =

Film award ceremony

- Official poster
- Awarded for: Finest achievements in documentary filmmaking and non-fiction television
- Date: November 8, 2026
- Site: Edison Ballroom, New York City, United States
- Presented by: Critics Choice Association
- Hosted by: Ross Mathews

Highlights
- Most wins: You Can See Everything (5)
- Most nominations: 14th (6)
- Critics Choice Impact Award: Ron Howard
- Pennebaker Award: Jehane Noujaim
- Website: Critics Choice Documentary Awards

Television/radio coverage
- Network: Facebook Live; YouTube; X

The 11th Critics Choice Documentary Awards, presented by the Critics Choice Association, were held on November 8, 2026, at the Edison Ballroom in New York City, to honor the finest achievements in documentary filmmaking and non-fiction television. American television host and personality Ross Mathews hosted the ceremony.

14th by Ava DuVernay led the slate with six nominations, followed by You Can See Everything, Once Upon a Time in Harlem, and Nuisance Bear each with five.

American filmmaker and documentarian Ron Howard was honored with the Critics Choice Impact Award, while American documentary film director Jehane Noujaim received the Pennebaker Award from Pennebaker's widow and collaborator, Chris Hegedus.

At the awards ceremony held on November 8, You Can See Everything won in all five categories for which it was nominated: Best Documentary Feature, Best Director, Best Cinematography, Best Editing, and Best Score. Once Upon a Time in Harlem also won three awards: Best Historical Documentary, Best Archival Documentary, and Best First Documentary Feature.

== Winners and nominees ==
Nathan Fielder, Best Director co-winner

Lance Oppenheim, Best Director co-winner

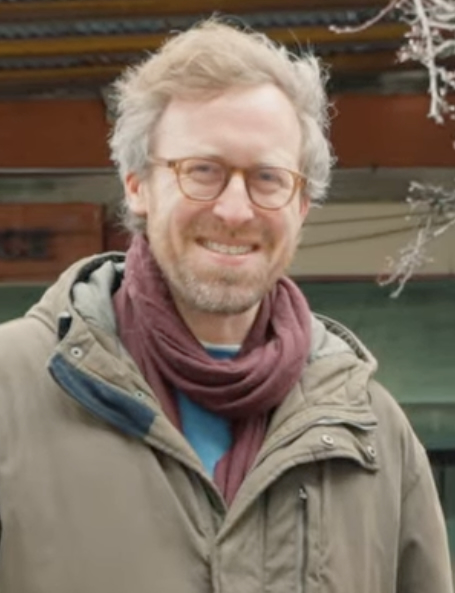
John Wilson, Best Narration winner

The nomination list was unveiled on 13 October 2026, and final voting was conducted between 14 October and 6 November 2026.

Winners are listed first and in bold face.

**Best Documentary Feature**: **You Can See Everything (A24)**; 14th (Netflix); Everest: The Other Side (National Geographic Documentary Films); Everybody to Kenmure Street (Icarus Films); The History of Concrete (Magnolia Pictures); Musk (Bleecker Street); NAZA (The Guardian, mk2 films); Once Upon a Time in Harlem (Neon); Rehearsals for a Revolution (Sony Pictures Classics); Remake (Music Box Films)	**Best Director**: **Nathan Fielder & Lance Oppenheim – You Can See Everything (A24)**; Yuval Abraham and Rachel Szor – NAZA (The Guardian, mk2 films); Felipe Bustos Sierra – Everybody to Kenmure Street (Icarus Films); Ava DuVernay – 14th (Netflix); Ross McElwee – Remake (Music Box Films); Orlando von Einsiedel – The Cycle of Love (Variance Films)
**Best First Documentary Feature**: **David Greaves – Once Upon a Time in Harlem (Neon)**; Baz Luhrmann – EPiC: Elvis Presley in Concert (Neon); Gabriela Osio Vanden and Jack Weisman – Nuisance Bear (MUBI); Xander Robin – The Python Hunt (Oscilloscope Laboratories); Poh Si Teng – American Doctor (Watermelon Pictures); John Wilson – The History of Concrete (Magnolia Pictures)	**Best True Crime Documentary**: **The Idaho Murders: College Nightmare (Netflix)**; **Lost Women of Alaska (Investigation Discovery)**; Baby Doe (Narrative Distribution); Funny Money: The Dane Cook Story (Dark Star Pictures); A Killer Story (HBO Max); Murder in Glitterball City (HBO Max)
**Best Music Documentary**: **EPiC: Elvis Presley in Concert (Neon)**; Earth, Wind & Fire (To Be Celestial vs That's the Weight of the World) (HBO Max); Man on the Run (Amazon MGM Studios); Oasis: Don't Look Back in Anger (Walt Disney Studios Motion Pictures); Peter Asher: Everywhere Man (Greenwich Entertainment); Sara Bareilles: Good Grief (Group Effort Films, Naked Edge Films)	**Best Political Documentary**: **NAZA (The Guardian, mk2 films)**; 14th (Netflix); American Doctor (Watermelon Pictures); Ask E. Jean (Abramorama); Everybody to Kenmure Street (Icarus Films); Musk (Bleecker Street); Union Town (Cabin Creek Films)
**Best Historical Documentary**: **Once Upon a Time in Harlem (Neon)**; 14th (Netflix); Rehearsals for a Revolution (Sony Pictures Classics); SCTV: The Greatest Show You've Never Heard Of (Netflix); Soul Patrol (Kino Lorber); Turning Point: Generation 9/11 (Netflix)	**Best Biographical Documentary**: **Musk (Bleecker Street)**; Avedon (Netflix); Jean-Michel Basquiat (Netflix); Lorne (Focus Features); Marty, Life Is Short (Netflix); Mel Brooks: The 99 Year Old Man! (HBO Max)
**Best Archival Documentary**: **Once Upon a Time in Harlem (Neon)**; EPiC: Elvis Presley in Concert (Neon); Making Marie Antoinette (Mubi); Man on the Run (Amazon MGM Studios); Rehearsals for a Revolution (Sony Pictures Classics); Remake (Music Box Films)	**Best Science/Nature Documentary**: **Nuisance Bear (MUBI)**; The AI Doc: Or How I Became an Apocaloptimist (Focus Features); Ghost Elephants (National Geographic Documentary Films); Lion (National Geographic); Secrets of the Bees (National Geographic); Time and Water (National Geographic Documentary Films)
**Best Sports Documentary**: **Everest: The Other Side (National Geographic Documentary Films)**; The Dynasty: UConn Huskies (Apple TV); Give Me the Ball! (ESPN); Rafa (Netflix); Standout: The Ben Kjar Story (Samuel Goldwyn Films); Tyson (Netflix)	**Best Short Documentary**: **The Baddest Speechwriter of All (Netflix)**; A Derailment (POV); Escalation (Bonfire Films); Miller Night Football (HBO Max); Oh Whale (The New Yorker, Switchboard Magazine); The Second Life of Freddie Nole (Sweet World Films); A Short Documentary About a Giant Pencil (archilux); They're Here (Praxis Films)
**Best Limited Documentary Series**: **Lion (National Geographic)**; 9/11: Reunited (National Geographic); The Dark Wizard (HBO Max); The Dynasty: UConn Huskies (Apple TV); High Horse: The Black Cowboy (Peacock); The Man Will Burn (HBO Max); Rafa (Netflix)	**Best Ongoing Documentary Series**: **30 for 30 (ESPN)**; American Masters (PBS); America’s Sweethearts: Dallas Cowboys Cheerleaders (Netflix); The Food That Built America (History); Hazardous History with Henry Winkler (History); Independent Lens (PBS); Untold (Netflix)
**Best Cinematography**: **David Bolen – You Can See Everything (A24)**; David Bolen and Matt Clegg – The Python Hunt (Oscilloscope Laboratories); Sophie Darlington – Lion (National Geographic); Franklin Dow – The Cycle of Love (Variance Films); Gabriela Osio Vanden and Jack Weisman – Nuisance Bear (MUBI); Clair Popkin, Jimmy Chin, Christopher Murphy – Everest: The Other Side (National Geographic Documentary Films)	**Best Editing**: **Adam Locke-Norton – You Can See Everything (A24)**; Spencer Averick – 14th (Netflix); Anne de Mare and Lynn True – Once Upon a Time in Harlem (Neon); Colin Monie – Everybody to Kenmure Street (Icarus Films); Jonathan Redmond – EPiC: Elvis Presley in Concert (Neon); Cori Wapnowska – The History of Concrete (Magnolia Pictures)
**Best Narration**: **The History of Concrete – Written and performed by John Wilson (Magnolia Pictures)**; The AI Doc: Or How I Became an Apocaloptimist – Written and performed by Daniel Roher and Caroline Lindy (Focus Features); Lorne – Written by Morgan Neville, Alan Lowe, Jake Hostetter; Performed by Chris Parnell (Focus Features); Nuisance Bear – Written and performed by Mike Tunalaaq Gibbons (Mubi); Rehearsals for a Revolution – Written and performed by Pegah Ahangarani (Sony Pictures Classics); Remake – Written and performed by Ross McElwee (Music Box Films)	**Best Score**: **Ari Balouzian – You Can See Everything (A24)**; Dan Deacon – Time and Water (National Geographic Documentary Films); Caroline Ho – Everest: The Other Side (National Geographic Documentary Films); Jason Moran – 14th (Netflix); Cristobal Tapia de Veer – Nuisance Bear (Mubi); Hans Zimmer, Niccolò Pacella, George Hutson Warren – Lion (National Geographic)

=== Pennebaker Award ===
- Jehane Noujaim, American documentary film director

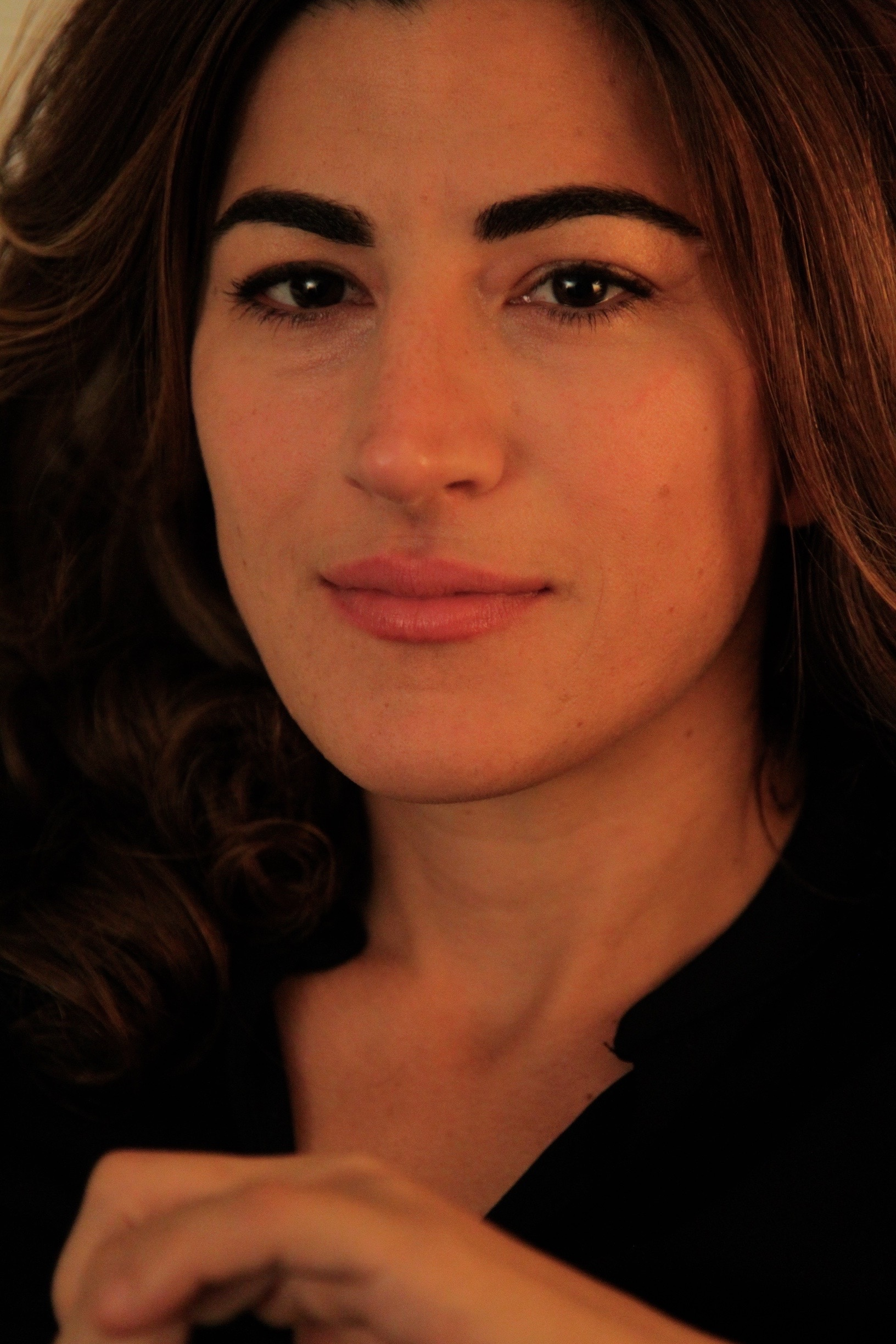
Jehane Noujaim recipient of Pennebaker Award

=== Critics Choice Impact Award ===
- Ron Howard, American filmmaker and documentarian

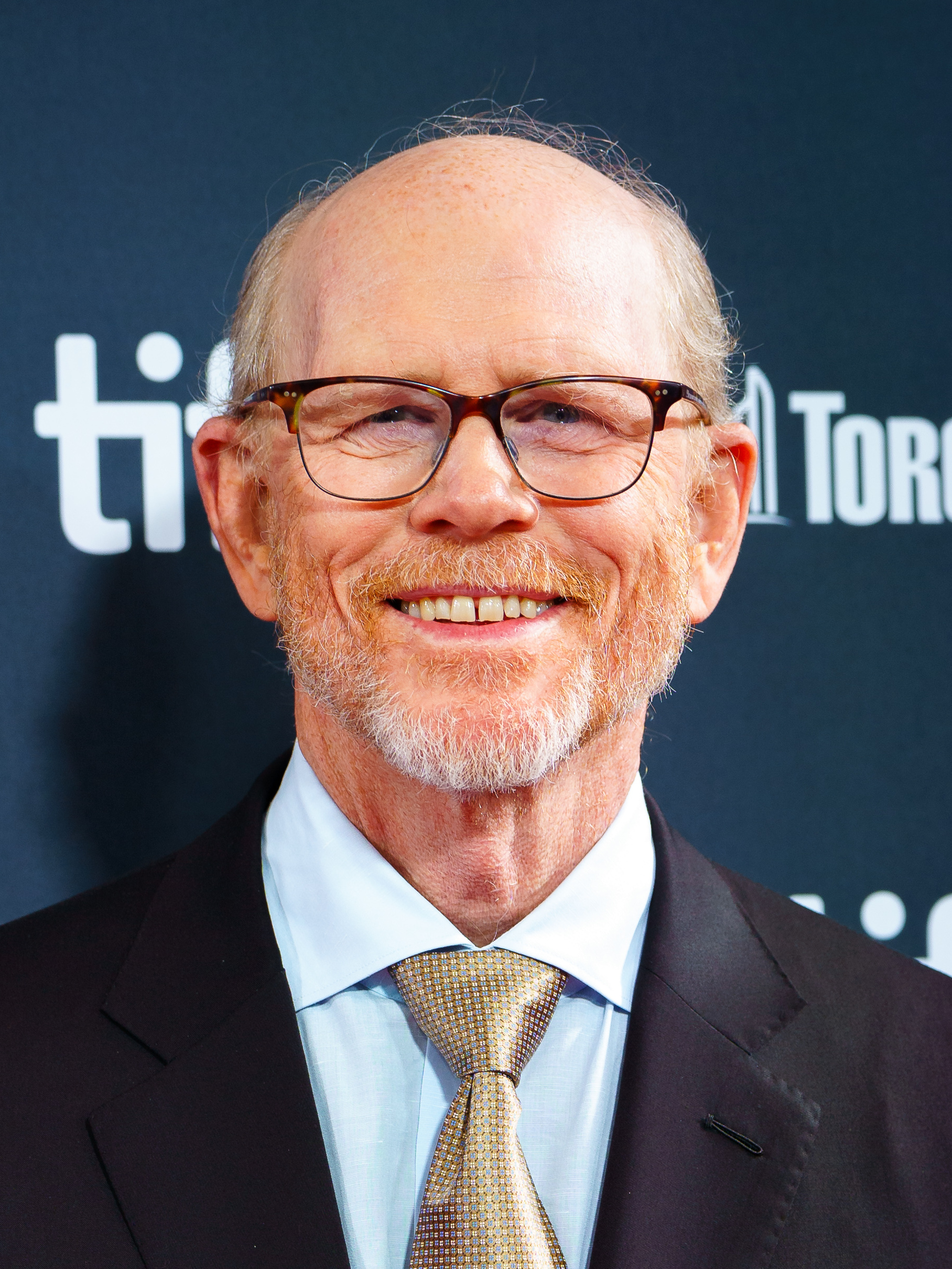
Ron Howard recipient of Critics Choice Impact Award

== Films with multiple wins and nominations ==
Films with multiple nominations
Nominations	Film	Production company(ies)
6	14th	Netflix
5	You Can See Everything	A24
5	Once Upon a Time in Harlem	Neon
5	Nuisance Bear	MUBI
4	Everybody to Kenmure Street	Icarus Films
4	Remake	Music Box Films
4	The History of Concrete	Magnolia Pictures
4	Rehearsals for a Revolution	Sony Pictures Classics
4	Everest: The Other Side	National Geographic Documentary Films
4	EPiC: Elvis Presley in Concert	Neon
4	Lion	National Geographic
3	NAZA	The Guardian, mk2 films
3	Musk	Bleecker Street

Films with multiple wins
Wins	Film
5	You Can See Everything
3	Once Upon a Time in Harlem
