= 14th (film) =

2026 American documentary film

- Release poster
- Directed by: Ava DuVernay
- Produced by: Ava DuVernay; Paul Garnes; Spencer Averick; Tammy Garnes
- Starring: Ava DuVernay; Stacey Abrams; David W. Blight; Lonnie Bunch; Robert Chang
- Cinematography: Cliff Charles; Michael Fernandez
- Edited by: Spencer Averick
- Music by: Jason Moran
- Production company: ARRAY
- Distributed by: Netflix
- Release dates: October 9, 2026 (NYFF); November 27, 2026 (United States); December 4, 2026 (Netflix)
- Running time: 108 minutes
- Country: United States
- Language: English

14th is a 2026 American documentary directed and produced by Ava DuVernay. It explores the Fourteenth Amendment to the United States Constitution, and serves as a companion piece to DuVernay's documentary feature 13th (2016).

The film had its world premiere in the Main Slate of the 2026 New York Film Festival on October 9, and is scheduled to receive a limited release on November 27, prior to streaming globally on Netflix on December 4.

== Premise ==
Explores the Fourteenth Amendment to the United States Constitution and its complications with African American communities.

== Cast ==
- Ava DuVernay
- Stacey Abrams
- David W. Blight
- Lonnie Bunch
- Robert Chang
- Jelani Cobb
- Donald T. Critchlow
- Jasmine Crockett
- Adam Domby
- Jeff Flake
- Eric Foner
- Carla Hayden
- Devon Henry
- Sherrilyn Ifill
- Van Lathan
- Anna Paulina Luna
- Hasan Minhaj
- Paul Mooney (archive footage)
- Alexandria Ocasio-Cortez
- Alex Padilla
- Hasan Piker
- Steve Schmidt
- Bryan Stevenson
- Dean Withers

== Production ==
In July 2026, it was announced Ava DuVernay had directed a documentary film revolving around the Fourteenth Amendment to the United States Constitution with Netflix set to distribute.

== Release ==
It had its world premiere in the Main Slate of the 2026 New York Film Festival on October 9, and is scheduled to be released in a limited release on November 27, prior to streaming on Netflix on December 4.

== Reception ==
On the review aggregator website Rotten Tomatoes, 84% of 19 critics' reviews are positive, with an average rating of 7.4/10. Metacritic, which uses a weighted average, assigned the film a score of 77 out of 100, based on 11 critics, indicating "generally favorable" reviews.

=== Accolades ===
Award	Date	Category	Recipient(s)	Result	Ref.
Critics' Choice Documentary Awards	November 8, 2026	Best Documentary Feature	14th	Nominated	
Critics' Choice Documentary Awards	November 8, 2026	Best Director	Ava DuVernay	Nominated	
Critics' Choice Documentary Awards	November 8, 2026	Best Political Documentary	14th	Nominated	
Critics' Choice Documentary Awards	November 8, 2026	Best Historical Documentary	14th	Nominated	
Critics' Choice Documentary Awards	November 8, 2026	Best Editing	Spencer Averick	Nominated	
Critics' Choice Documentary Awards	November 8, 2026	Best Score	Jason Moran	Nominated	
