= EPiC: Elvis Presley in Concert =

2025 film by Baz Luhrmann

- American theatrical release poster
- Directed by: Baz Luhrmann
- Produced by: Baz Luhrmann; Colin Smeeton; Schuyler Weiss; Jeremy Castro; Matthew Gross
- Starring: Elvis Presley
- Edited by: Jonathan Redmond
- Production companies: Sony Music Vision; Bazmark Films; Authentic Studios
- Distributed by: Neon (United States); Universal Pictures (International)
- Release dates: September 6, 2025 (TIFF); February 20, 2026 (United States)
- Running time: 96 minutes
- Countries: United States; Australia
- Language: English
- Budget: $10–11 million
- Box office: $23.5 million

EPiC: Elvis Presley in Concert (officially Baz Luhrmann's EPiC: Elvis Presley in Concert) is a 2025 documentary film about Elvis Presley directed by Baz Luhrmann. It is a follow-up to Luhrmann's 2022 biopic Elvis. The film premiered at the Toronto International Film Festival on September 6, 2025. It received critical acclaim.

EPiC had its first advance American screenings at Graceland on January 8, 2026, which would have been Presley's 91st birthday. It was then released exclusively in IMAX cinemas beginning on February 20, 2026. Subsequently, it was then released on conventional cinema screens one week later on February 27, 2026.

== Production ==
Filmmaker Baz Luhrmann originally sought out unseen footage of Elvis Presley from Elvis: That's the Way It Is (1970) and Elvis on Tour (1972) with the intent of using it in his 2022 Elvis film. Sixty-eight boxes of both 35mm and 8mm footage were found in the Warner Bros. film archives within salt mines in Kansas, including outtakes from both films, plus the "gold jacket" performance from Hawaii in 1957. This footage, however, came without sound. Over the next two years, it was restored and synced to existing audio sources by Luhrmann's team. A 45-minute audio recording was also uncovered of Presley talking about his life story. All this material forms the basis of EPiC. Luhrmann has described the project as neither fully a documentary nor a concert film, but "something new in the Elvis canon... that befits the magnitude of Elvis as a performer but also offers deeper revelations of his humanity and inner life."

Various images and short clips from the editing process had been shared by Luhrmann on his Instagram account throughout 2025, including one of the "gold jacket" performance. On May 30, Luhrmann shared footage from EPiC at a Sony Music Vision showcase. On August 14, Luhrmann shared a previously unseen restored clip of Presley singing "Oh Happy Day" and announced that the film would premiere on September 6, 2025, at the Toronto International Film Festival.

== Reception ==
=== Box office ===
During its theatrical run, EPiC earned $13.6 million at the domestic box office and $9.9 million at the international box office, for a worldwide total of $23.5 million.

=== Critical reception ===
On review aggregator website Rotten Tomatoes, 97% of 116 reviews are positive, with an average rating of 8.5/10. The consensus reads, "Resurrecting Elvis Presley at the peak of his showmanship, Baz Luhrmann's truly epic concert documentary restores some joy into The King's legacy, thank you very much." Metacritic, which uses a weighted average, assigned the film a score of 86 out of 100, based on 27 critics, indicating "universal acclaim". Audiences polled by CinemaScore gave the film a rare average grade of "A+" on an A+ to F scale.

Owen Gleiberman in Variety called the film "one of the most exciting concert films you've ever seen ... Elvis in the raw, driven by the awareness that it doesn't get any better than that." Radheyan Simonpillai in The Guardian praised the concert sequences but criticised Luhrmann's "refusal ... to meaningfully hold Elvis to account". Steve Pond wrote in TheWrap that EPiC combines both "offstage and onstage Elvis" into an "Elvispalooza (that) is fit for a king".

=== Accolades ===
Award	Date of ceremony	Category	Recipient(s)	Result	Ref.
Toronto International Film Festival	September 14, 2025	People's Choice Award for Documentaries	EPiC: Elvis Presley in Concert	Runner-up	
Critics' Choice Documentary Awards	November 8, 2026	Best First Documentary Feature	Baz Luhrmann	Nominated	
Critics' Choice Documentary Awards	November 8, 2026	Best Music Documentary	EPiC: Elvis Presley in Concert	Won	
Critics' Choice Documentary Awards	November 8, 2026	Best Archival Documentary	EPiC: Elvis Presley in Concert	Nominated	
Critics' Choice Documentary Awards	November 8, 2026	Best Editing	Jonathan Redmond	Nominated	

== Streaming and physical release ==
EPiC became available for streaming, specifically for purchase and rent, on Amazon Prime Video, Apple TV and Fandango at Home on April 7, 2026. The film was originally scheduled to be released on 4K Ultra HD, Blu-ray and DVD on June 16, 2026, but was delayed. It became available for streaming in the US on Paramount+ on June 3, 2026, and became available on said streaming service in Canada on July 24, 2026. Across the Atlantic, and as compiled by the UK Official Charts Company, which corresponded to UK sales of the video on the seven day period from 20 to 26 June, the film's official video release by Universal entered at the #1 position in both the aforementioned video chart and their separate music video chart, starting on June 27, 2026. EPiC was officially released on physical media in North America on August 11, 2026.

== Soundtrack ==
EPiC: Elvis Presley in Concert

Soundtrack album by Elvis Presley
- Released: February 20, 2026
- Genres: Pop; rock and roll; rhythm and blues; country
- Length: 74:15
- Label: RCA

A soundtrack to EPiC was released on CD, streaming services and as a digital download on February 20, 2026; the same day the film was released in IMAX. It features new mixes and remixes of Presley's performances featured in the film. It reached the top of the UK's Official Album Soundtrack Chart the week of March 3, 2026. That same week, it also reached No. 6 on Billboard's Soundtrack Chart in the US. The song "Burning Love", one of whose versions appears in the film, reentered the UK Official Singles Downloads and Official Singles Sales charts on the week of March 17, 2026. The soundtrack was released on vinyl on April 24, 2026, omitting the song "Don't Fly Away (Pnau remix)". The week of May 10, 2026, it reached No. 8 on Billboard's Vinyl Albums Chart in the US.

=== Track listing ===
No.	Title	Artist(s)	Length
1.	"Can't Help Falling in Love" (EPiC intro)	Presley	0:21
2.	"Also sprach Zarathustra / An American Trilogy" (EPiC version)	Presley; Royal Philharmonic Orchestra	1:49
3.	"That's All Right" (EPiC version)	Presley	2:02
4.	"Tiger Man" (EPiC version)	Presley	1:41
5.	"Wearin' That Night Life Look"	Presley; Jamieson Shaw	3:12
6.	"Hound Dog" (EPiC version)	Presley	1:20
7.	"Polk Salad Annie" (EPiC version)	Presley	5:43
8.	"You've Lost That Lovin' Feelin'" (EPiC version)	Presley	4:21
9.	"Little Sister / Get Back" (EPiC version)	Presley	3:04
10.	"Burning Love" (EPiC version)	Presley; Royal Philharmonic Orchestra	3:22
11.	"Never Been to Spain" (EPiC version)	Presley	2:15
12.	"Love Me" (Jamieson Shaw remix)	Presley; Shaw	3:49
13.	"I Can't Stop Loving You" (EPiC version)	Presley	2:13
14.	"Are You Lonesome Tonight?" (EPiC version)	Presley	1:47
15.	"Always on My Mind" (EPiC version)	Presley	2:30
16.	"How Great Thou Art" (EPiC version)	Presley	2:51
17.	"Oh Happy Day" (EPiC version)	Presley; Shaw	3:11
18.	"A Big Hunk o' Love" (EPiC version)	Presley	2:06
19.	"Bridge over Troubled Water" (EPiC version)	Presley	4:14
20.	"In the Ghetto" (Jamieson Shaw remix)	Presley; Shaw	4:09
21.	"Walk a Mile in My Shoes" (EPiC version)	Presley	2:00
22.	"Suspicious Minds" (EPiC version)	Presley	4:50
23.	"Bring the Curtain Down" (EPiC outro)	Presley	1:10
24.	"Can't Help Falling in Love" (EPiC version)	Presley	1:56
25.	"American David" (EPiC version)	Bono; Elliott Wheeler	0:48
26.	"A Change of Reality (Do You Miss Me?)"	Presley; Shaw	3:10
27.	"Don't Fly Away" (Pnau remix)	Presley; Pnau	4:08
