= UTA Independent Film Group =

Film finance and sales division of United Talent Agency

- Company type: Division
- Industry: Film finance, Sales, Packaging
- Founded: 1996
- Headquarters: Beverly Hills, California
- Area served: Worldwide
- Key people: Rena Ronson (Head); Jim Meenaghan (Co-Head)
- Parent: United Talent Agency
- Website: www.unitedtalent.com

UTA Independent Film Group is the film financing, packaging, and sales division of United Talent Agency (UTA). Based in Beverly Hills, California, the group specializes in structuring financing and brokering distribution deals for independent films at major festivals, including Sundance, TIFF, and Cannes.

It is currently led by partner and head Rena Ronson and co-head Jim Meenaghan.

== History ==
United Talent Agency originally established a dedicated independent film unit in 1996 to assist filmmakers in packaging projects and securing financing outside the traditional studio system.

The division underwent a significant expansion in October 2009 when veteran agent Rena Ronson joined UTA from William Morris Independent following the WME merger. Ronson was hired to co-head the group alongside Rich Klubeck, aiming to compete directly with rival agencies CAA and WME in the independent marketplace.

Under Ronson's leadership, the group became known for brokering high-profile sales, including the record-breaking $17.5 million (plus 69 cents) deal for Palm Springs at the 2020 Sundance Film Festival. The group also handled the sales of Academy Award-winning films such as Room, I, Tonya, The Big Sick, and Call Me by Your Name.

== Operations ==
The group focuses on packaging films (attaching talent, directors, and financing) and acting as a sales agent to sell distribution rights to studios and streamers. It operates globally, with a significant presence at the Sundance Film Festival and Toronto International Film Festival.

In 2025, the group represented sales titles including the John Wilson documentary The History of Concrete.

== Notable Sales ==
Selected films packaged or sold by the group include:

- The Big Sick (2017)
- Call Me by Your Name (2017)
- I, Tonya (2017)
- The Farewell (2019)
- Palm Springs (2020)
- Fair Play (2023)
- The History of Concrete (2026)
