= The History of Concrete =

2026 documentary film by John Wilson

- Theatrical release poster
- Directed by: John Wilson
- Produced by: Clark Filio; Shirel Kozak; Allie Viti; Francis Carr
- Starring: John Wilson
- Cinematography: Nellie Kluz
- Edited by: Cori Wapnowska
- Production companies: Central Pictures; Bronxburgh
- Distributed by: Magnolia Pictures
- Release dates: January 22, 2026 (Sundance); September 18, 2026 (United States)
- Running time: 101 minutes
- Country: United States
- Language: English
- Box office: $3 million

The History of Concrete is a 2026 American documentary film directed by John Wilson in his feature directorial debut. The film is produced by Wilson's frequent collaborators, alongside executive producers Josh Safdie, Eli Bush, and Ronald Bronstein.

It premiered at the Sundance Film Festival on January 22, 2026, and had a limited theatrical release from Magnolia Pictures in the U.S. on September 18, 2026. The film received widespread praise from critics.

== Premise ==
After attending a workshop on how to write and sell a Hallmark movie, filmmaker John Wilson attempts to utilize the same commercial formula to create and sell a documentary about the history of concrete. The project evolves into a humorous and philosophical exploration of urbanism, the built environment, and the mundane textures of American life.

== Production ==
The film marks the feature directorial debut of John Wilson, best known for his critically acclaimed HBO series How To with John Wilson. It is produced by Clark Filio, Shirel Kozak, and Allie Viti.

Executive producers include Josh Safdie, Eli Bush, and Ronald Bronstein, who previously collaborated with Wilson on his HBO series. Conor Hannon and Richie Doyle are also executive producers. The film's unique premise—applying the Hallmark movie formula to a documentary subject—was highlighted by Sundance programmers as "effortlessly hysterical and genuinely hard to describe."

== Release ==
=== Theatrical ===
The History of Concrete premiered at the "Premieres" section at the Sundance Film Festival on January 22, 2026. In March 2026, Magnolia Pictures acquired distribution rights to the film. It began a limited theatrical release in New York on September 18, 2026, followed by a nationwide release in 36 states at over 120 theaters beginning September 25.

=== Home media ===
The History of Concrete was released on digital streaming on November 3, 2026.

== Reception ==
On the review aggregator website Rotten Tomatoes, 98% of 82 critics' reviews are positive, with an average rating of 7.8/10. The website's consensus reads: "The History of Concrete transforms a seemingly banal subject into a funny, moving, and genuinely revelatory exploration of the overlooked worlds and universal connections hiding in plain sight." Metacritic, which uses a weighted average, assigned the film a score of 83 out of 100, based on 23 critics, indicating "universal acclaim".

In a positive review, Daniel Fienberg of The Hollywood Reporter wrote that "many of its emotional grace notes land fully." Adrian Horton of The Guardian gave the film four out of five stars and wrote that it "is consistently laugh-out-loud funny, compelling and wowing, if 20 minutes too long. And, of course, about much more than just concrete."

=== Accolades ===
| Award | Date | Category | Recipient(s) | Result | Ref. |
|---|---|---|---|---|---|
| Critics' Choice Documentary Awards | November 8, 2026 | Best Documentary Feature | The History of Concrete | Nominated | |
| Critics' Choice Documentary Awards | November 8, 2026 | Best First Documentary Feature | John Wilson | Nominated | |
| Critics' Choice Documentary Awards | November 8, 2026 | Best Editing | Cori Wapnowska | Nominated | |
| Critics' Choice Documentary Awards | November 8, 2026 | Best Narration | John Wilson | Won | |
| Cinema Eye Honors | January 11, 2027 | Outstanding Achievement in Direction | John Wilson | Pending | |
| Cinema Eye Honors | January 11, 2027 | Outstanding Achievement in Debut Feature Filmmaking | John Wilson | Pending | |
