= On Falling =

- Film poster
- Directed by: Laura Carreira
- Written by: Laura Carreira
- Produced by: Jack Thomas-O'Brien; Mário Patrocínio
- Starring: Joana Santos
- Cinematography: Karl Kürten
- Edited by: Helle Le Fevre
- Music by: Joshua Sabin
- Production companies: Sixteen Films; Bro Cinema
- Distributed by: Conic (uk); NOS Audiovisuais (pt)
- Release dates: 6 September 2024 (TIFF); 7 March 2025 (United Kingdom); 27 March 2025 (Portugal)
- Running time: 104 minutes
- Countries: United Kingdom; Portugal
- Languages: English; Portuguese
- Box office: $181,376

On Falling is a 2024 social realist drama film, written and directed by Laura Carreira and starring Joana Santos. A British-Portuguese co-production, the film is Carreira's debut feature.

It had its world premiere at the 2024 Toronto International Film Festival, also screening at the 72nd San Sebastián International Film Festival, where Carreira won the Silver Shell for Best Director. It was released theatrically in the United Kingdom and Portugal, respectively on 7 March 2025 and 27 March 2025. Santos won the Sophia Award for Best Actress for her leading role in the film.

== Plot ==
Set in Scotland, the plot follows the plight of Portuguese immigrant and warehouse worker Aurora, trapped in a life governed by wage slavery and social isolation and its repercussions, leading to her emotional breakdown.

== Cast ==
- Joana Santos as Aurora

== Production ==
The film is a British-Portuguese co-production by Sixteen Films and Bro Cinema, and it had support from BFI, BBC Film, Screen Scotland and ICA. It was the feature film debut for Carreira, previously known for her shorts The Shift and Red Hill.

== Release ==
On Falling had its world premiere at the 2024 Toronto International Film Festival as part of its Discovery programme. It was presented at the 72nd San Sebastián International Film Festival on 24 September 2024, in competition for the Golden Shell; Carreira took the award for Best Director (ex-aequo) at the festival. It featured in the First Feature Competition of the 2024 BFI London Film Festival. where it was awarded the Sutherland prize for Best First Feature.

Conic acquired UK and Ireland distribution rights, and released it theatrically on 7 March 2025. It opened in Portuguese theatres on 27 March 2025. It also landed a distributor in the Benelux (Vedette), former Yugoslavia (MCF), Greece (Cinobo), Middle East (Teleview), Spain (Vértigo, which scheduled a 19 September 2025 theatrical release date), and Switzerland (Frenetic).

== Reception ==
=== Critical response ===
On the review aggregator website Rotten Tomatoes, 94% of 16 critics' reviews are positive, with an average rating of 8.4/10.

Peter Bradshaw of The Guardian rated the film 4 out of 5 stars, calling it "a very impressive debut".

Matthew Joseph Jenner of International Cinephile Society rated the film 4 out of 5 stars, writing that it "conveys a very clear message and delivers it with genuine affection and attention to detail, which is important for a story that carries such resonance".

Fionnuala Halligan of ScreenDaily pointed out how the film grows to become "an intense, enveloping experience".

Sophie Monks Kaufman of IndieWire gave the film an 'A-' rating, deeming it to be "far better than anything living-political-legend Loach made during the final innings of his career".

David Katz of Cineuropa declared the film "laudably a protest film clamouring for a better way of life, but it still evokes a story's first act mistaken for a whole feature".

=== Accolades ===
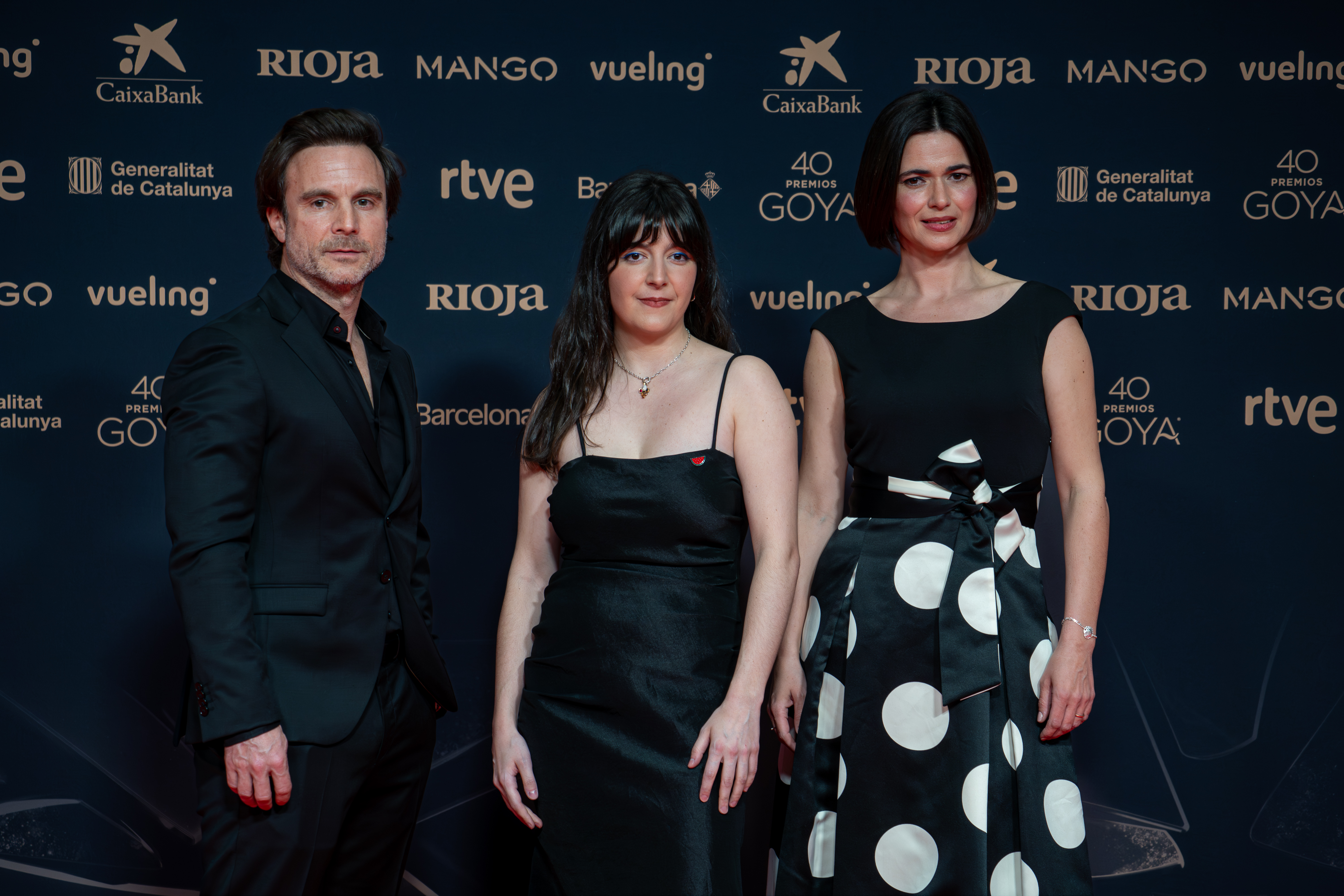
Team of On Falling attending the 40th Goya Awards.

Award	Date of ceremony	Category	Recipient(s)	Result	Ref.
San Sebastián International Film Festival	28 September 2024	Golden Shell	On Falling	Nominated	
San Sebastián International Film Festival	28 September 2024	RTVE-Another Look Award – Special Mention	On Falling	Won	
San Sebastián International Film Festival	28 September 2024	Silver Shell for Best Director	Laura Carreira	Won	
BFI London Film Festival	20 October 2024	Sutherland Award for Best First Feature	On Falling	Won	
BAFTA Scotland Awards	16 November 2025	Best Feature Film	On Falling	Won	
BAFTA Scotland Awards	16 November 2025	Best Writer (Film/Television)	Laura Carreira	Won	
British Independent Film Awards	30 November 2025	Best Director	Laura Carreira	Nominated	
British Independent Film Awards	30 November 2025	Best Screenplay	Laura Carreira	Nominated	
British Independent Film Awards	30 November 2025	Douglas Hickox Award (Best Debut Director)	Laura Carreira	Nominated	
British Independent Film Awards	30 November 2025	Best Debut Screenwriter	Laura Carreira	Nominated	
European Film Awards	17 January 2026	European Discovery – Prix FIPRESCI	On Falling	Won	
Goya Awards	28 February 2026	Best European Film	On Falling	Nominated	
Sophia Awards	15 May 2026	Best Film	On Falling	Nominated	
Sophia Awards	15 May 2026	Best Director	Laura Carreira	Nominated	
Sophia Awards	15 May 2026	Best Original Screenplay	Laura Carreira	Nominated	
Sophia Awards	15 May 2026	Best Actress	Joana Santos	Won	
Sophia Awards	15 May 2026	Best Editing	Helle Le Fevre	Nominated	

== See also ==
- List of British films of 2025
- List of Portuguese films of 2025
