= Everybody to Kenmure Street =

2026 Scottish documentary film

- Film poster
- Directed by: Felipe Bustos Sierra
- Produced by: Ciara Barry; Felipe Bustos Sierra
- Cinematography: Kirstin McMahon
- Edited by: Colin Monie
- Music by: Barry Burns
- Production companies: Barry Crerar; Screen Scotland
- Release date: January 22, 2026 (Sundance)
- Running time: 99 minutes
- Country: Scotland
- Language: English

Everybody to Kenmure Street is a 2026 documentary film directed by Felipe Bustos Sierra that chronicles the Kenmure Street protests, the community resistance to a Home Office immigration raid in Glasgow's Pollokshields neighbourhood in 2021.

The film premiered at the 2026 Sundance Film Festival, where it won the Special Jury Award for Civil Resistance.

== Synopsis ==
The film follows the events of a 2021 Home Office immigration raid on Kenmure Street in Glasgow's Pollokshields neighbourhood at dawn on the day of Eid al-Fatir. Local residents gathered to prevent the detention of individuals, with hundreds surrounding the Home Office van. Through crowd-sourced footage, archival material, and dramatised scenes, the documentary presents a chronological account of the protest.

== Production ==
Everybody to Kenmure Street was directed by Felipe Bustos Sierra and produced by Ciara Barry of Glasgow-based production company Barry Crerar. Bustos Sierra lived in walking distance of the protest in 2021, but did not participate, and he says the film is a reminder that "if we don't turn up, nothing happens. I missed out on that collective joy and expression of empathy which to me is happiness."

The film was awarded the Al Jazeera Documentary Award at Cannes Docs, an industry programme held alongside the Cannes Film Festival, recognizing documentary projects presented during the showcase.

The production was supported by Screen Scotland, Scottish trade unions, and a successful Kickstarter crowdfunding campaign. Two-time Academy Award winner Emma Thompson boarded the film as an executive producer in May 2025. Thompson voices a subject known in the film only as "Van Man," an activist who launched the protest by climbing under the van and wrapping his arm around one of the axles.

Conic acquired UK and Ireland distribution rights to the film, ahead of its world premiere at the 2026 Sundance Film Festival.

== Release ==
The film premiered in January 2026 at the Sundance Film Festival, screening on the opening day as part of the World Cinema Documentary Competition. It won the Sundance Special Jury Award.

The film debuted in the UK at the Glasgow Film Festival in February 2026.

== Reception ==
On the review aggregator website Rotten Tomatoes, 100% of 45 critics' reviews are positive, with an average rating of 8.1/10. The website's consensus reads: "A spirited and uplifting documentary, Everybody to Kenmure Street triumphantly captures a community's witty, determined stand against injustice through the power of collective action."

=== Accolades ===
Award	Date	Category	Recipient(s)	Result	Ref.
Sundance Film Festival	February 1, 2026	Grand Jury Prize – World Cinema Documentary Competition	Everybody to Kenmure Street	Nominated	
Sundance Film Festival	February 1, 2026	Special Jury Award for Civil Resistance	Everybody to Kenmure Street	Won	
British Independent Film Awards	December 6, 2026	Best Documentary	Felipe Bustos Sierra, Ciara Barry	Pending	
Cinema Eye Honors	January 11, 2027	Outstanding Achievement in Editing	Colin Monie	Pending	
