= Devon Henry =

Businessman who removed confederate monuments

Devon M. Henry
- Henry in 2026
- Education: Norfolk State University
- Occupations: Entrepreneur, Activist
- Known for: Removal of over 24 confederate monuments

Devon M. Henry is an American contractor and entrepreneur best known for leading the removal of more than 20 Confederate monuments across the southeastern United States between 2020 and 2022, including the Robert E. Lee statue in Richmond, Virginia. His work received national and international attention for its historical significance, logistical complexity, and the personal risk involved. In 2025, Norfolk State University honored Henry by naming its campus communications tower the Devon M. Henry Communication Tower.

== Confederate monument removal ==
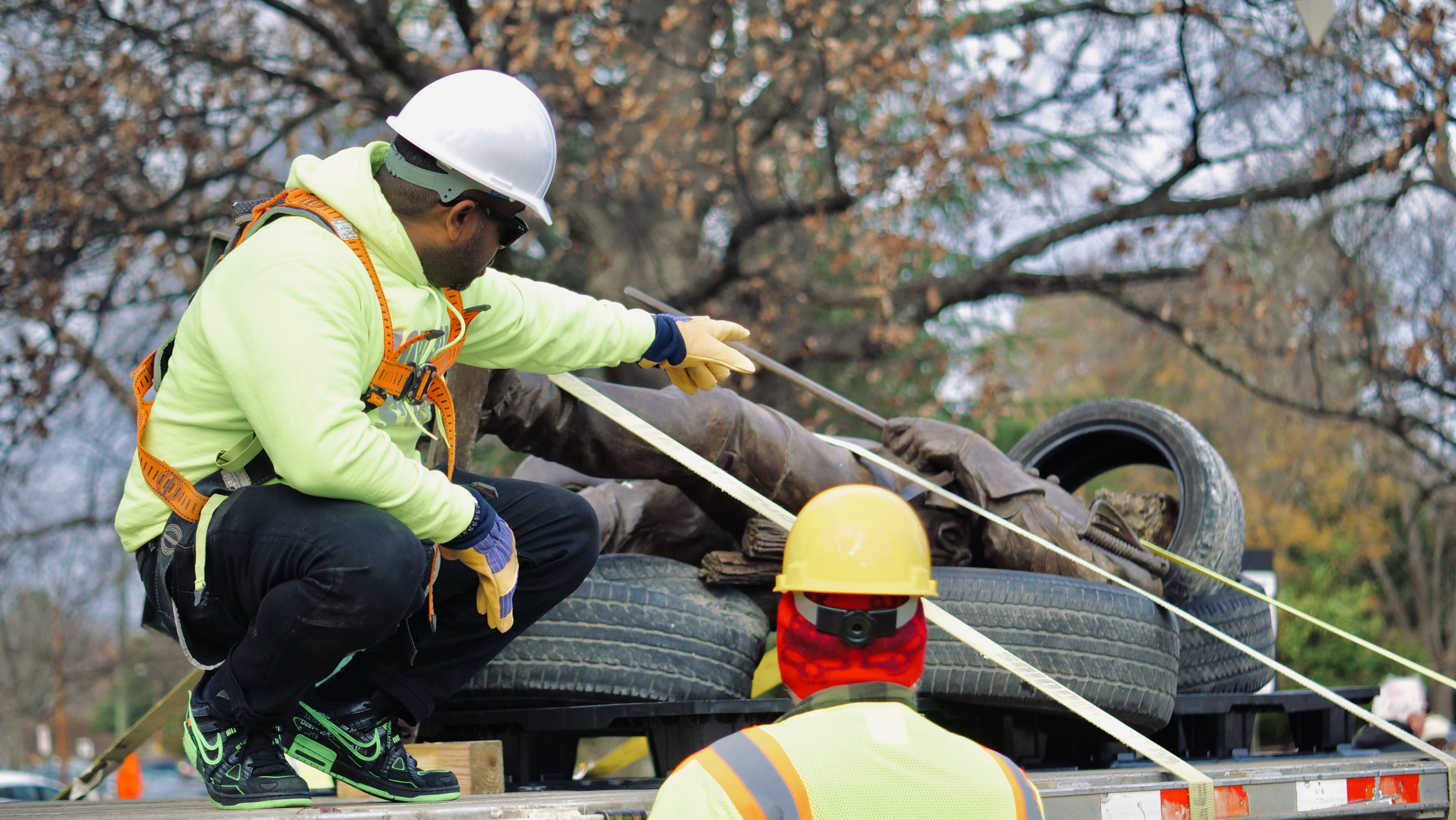
Devon Henry removing the AP Hill Confederate Memorial in Richmond, Virginia

Henry came to prominence in 2020 amid nationwide protests following the murder of George Floyd, when many local and state governments sought contractors to remove Confederate statues. Many contractors declined due to safety concerns and political backlash. Richmond Mayor Levar Stoney’s administration approached Henry’s company, Team Henry Enterprises, after others refused the work. For safety, Henry initially used a shell company name to conceal his identity, as contractors involved in removals had received death threats.

Henry’s crew began removals in July 2020, including statues along Monument Avenue such as Stonewall Jackson and other Confederate figures. In September 2021, after legal challenges were resolved, Henry’s team removed the 21-foot statue of Robert E. Lee from its 40-foot pedestal in Richmond. He also oversaw the removal of statues in Charlottesville and other Virginia cities.

The removal of the Lee statue, in particular, garnered national and international coverage and was described as a symbolic turning point in the public reckoning with Confederate iconography, highlighted by American Society of Landscape Architects. A special prosecutor later cleared the Richmond mayor’s office of wrongdoing in awarding the contract, affirming that the selection process was proper.

By the end of 2022, Henry’s company had removed more than 20 Confederate monuments across the Southeast and in 2023, the company was also responsible for removing the Confederate Memorial at Arlington National Cemetery.

Henry appears in Ava DuVernay's 2026 documentary 14th, which includes a segment on his work removing Confederate monuments in Richmond, Virginia.

== Early life and education ==
Henry grew up in the Hampton Roads region of Virginia. He worked at a McDonald's restaurant at age 14 alongside his mother, who later became a franchise owner in Richmond. He earned a bachelor's degree in biology from Norfolk State University and later a master's degree in environmental management from the University of Maryland.

== Business career ==
In the mid-2000s, Henry left a corporate role at General Electric to purchase a small construction firm, which he developed into Team Henry Enterprises, based in Newport News, Virginia. The company provides construction, environmental contracting, disaster response, and project management services, and has completed projects such as the Memorial to Enslaved Laborers at the University of Virginia.

== Honors and recognition ==
In July 2025, Norfolk State University named its campus communications tower after Henry in recognition of his professional achievements and support for historically Black colleges and universities. In December 2025, Henry was conferred an honorary Doctorate of Humane Letters from Norfolk State University. He has received awards from business and civic organizations, including recognition from the Black History Museum and Cultural Center of Virginia which honored Henry with its inaugural 1895 Living Legacy - Enduring Legacy Award, inspired by Arthur Ashe, to honor those using education, arts, or culture to build lasting impact.
