= Yanjaa =

Swedish-Mongolian comedian and television personality

- Born: Ulaanbaatar, Mongolia
- Education: Stockholm Business School (Bachelor of Economics)
- Occupations: Comedian, television personality, memory expert
- Website: yanjaa.com

Yänjaa Westgate, known as Yanjaa, is a New York-based Swedish-Mongolian memory champion, comedian, and television personality. She first gained international recognition for her achievements in memory sports before expanding into entertainment, appearing on numerous television shows, documentaries and performing stand-up and sketch comedy.

== Early life and education ==
Born in Ulaanbaatar, Mongolia with primarily Indigenous Siberian Buryat descent, Yanjaa grew up across multiple cultures. Her international upbringing included time on the Mongolian steppe, Stockholm, Tokyo, and Kenya, where she attended the Swedish School of Nairobi. She graduated from Stockholm Business School with a degree in Business and Economics.

== Career ==
=== Memory championships ===
Yanjaa was originally inspired to compete after reading Moonwalking with Einstein by American author Joshua Foer, having discovered memory techniques while struggling with her university studies. Within her first year of memory training, she won team gold and first place in names and faces at the World Memory Championships. She achieved the title of International Grandmaster of Memory, becoming one of only 22 people to hold this distinction. Her most notable achievements include breaking three world records: memorizing 212 names and faces in 15 minutes (2017), 360 random images in 5 minutes (2018), and 145 random words in 5 minutes (2018). Together with Mongolian teammate Munkhshur Narmandakh, they became the first women in history to place at the world event, securing bronze and silver positions respectively out of over 130 contestants. In 2016, she was invited as one of the top 200 Leaders of Tomorrow at the 46th St. Gallen Symposium in St. Gallen, Switzerland for her achievements in memory sports.

=== Television and entertainment ===
Yanjaa gained mainstream attention in 2017 when she became the "IKEA Human Catalogue," memorizing the entire 328-page catalogue in one week. The campaign garnered international media attention with press conferences in Thailand, Malaysia, and Singapore, won both the people's voice and jury's Webby Award for best social media campaign in 2018.

She has since appeared in several notable productions, including Netflix's The Mind, Explained (2019), a limited series narrated by Emma Stone, and HBO's How to with John Wilson (2020). Her documentary Memory Games (2018) premiered to a sold-out audience in New York before being acquired by Netflix. Her expertise in memory training and language learning has been featured in Today, The Guardian, and Wired, among other international publications.

In 2020, Yanjaa hosted Minnet, a Spotify-exclusive podcast exploring memory techniques with celebrity guests. She later transitioned into comedy, performing at venues across North America and Europe and winning several comedy competitions. In 2024, she joined IFS – invandrare för svenskar (IFS – Immigrants for Swedes), a prominent comedy panel show on Sweden's national broadcaster SVT.

== Selected filmography ==
Year	Title	Role	Notes
2025	Förrädarna	Self – Contestant	SVT
2024	IFS – invandrare för svenskar	Self – Comedian	SVT, TV Series, Panelist
2023	Superihmiset – piilotettua kykyä etsimässä	Self – Memory Coach	YLE, TV Series
2020	How to with John Wilson	Self	HBO, TV Series
2019	The Mind, Explained	Self – Memory Champion	Netflix, TV Series
2019	Smartare än en femteklassare	Self – Contestant	TV Series
2018	Memory Games	Self	Netflix documentary
2017–2018	Pickler & Ben	Self	TV Series, 3 episodes
2017–2018	Steve	Self – Memory Expert	TV Series, 2 episodes
2017	The Brain	Self – Contestant	Chinese TV Series
2017	Talang	Self – Golden Buzzer Recipient, Finalist	TV Series, 3 episodes
2016	How to Remember Everything	Self	ITV documentary
2015	Masterminds	Self	SVT documentary

== Records and achievements ==
- World Memory Championships: 18th overall (2014), 8th place (2015), 3rd overall (2017)
- National Championships: Bronze medal (2014), Silver medal (2015)
- Highest World Ranking: No. 7 (September 2018)

As of 2018, Yanjaa holds three world records in memory sports:

- 15-minute Names & Faces: 212 names (2017)
- 5-minute Random Images: 360 images (2018)
- 5-minute Random Words: 145 words (2018)

== See also ==
- List of Swedish comedians
- Memory sport
