= Nae Pasaran =

2018 documentary film

- Directed by: Felipe Bustos Sierra
- Production company: Debasers Films
- Release date: March 4, 2018 (Glasgow Film Festival)
- Running time: 96 minutes
- Language: English

Nae Pasaran is a 2018 documentary directed by Felipe Bustos Sierra about a group of workers at a Rolls-Royce factory in East Kilbride, Scotland, who refused to work on Chilean Air Force parts from 1974-78 due to the atrocities carried out in Chile by the Pinochet dictatorship. The feature-length film was expanded from an earlier 2013 short film by the same name, funded through the Scottish Documentary Institute's Bridging the Gap programme. The film was the last programme broadcast on the new BBC Scotland channel's first day on air and was rebroadcast on the same channel on 4 May and 20 October 2019 and on 21 November 2020. A lost engine rediscovered during production was brought back to Scotland and unveiled as a public monument, in commemoration of the boycott, at South Lanarkshire College, East Kilbride in 2019.

== Production ==
The feature-length film tells the story of four Scotsmen – Bob Fulton, John Keenan, Robert Somerville and Stuart Barrie – who along with their workmates downed tools and refused to service and repair engines for the Chilean air force's British-made Hawker Hunter jet fighters. It explores just how significant their actions were in depriving the Chilean military dictatorship of much of its air power, contrary to the latter's claims at the time, through witness statements not only from several victims of the 1973 military coup but also from the unrepentant former Chilean Air Force chief Fernando Rojas Vender. Following Chile's return to democracy, three of the four Scotsmen – Fulton, Keenan and Somerville – were awarded the highest honour which the Chilean government can bestow on foreigners, the Order of Bernardo O'Higgins, at the rank of Commander (Comendador), during a 2015 ceremony at the City Chambers in Glasgow by Chile's ambassador to the UK, Rolando Drago. The ceremony was included in the film and co-organised by the director.

== Release ==
The feature-length film was commercially released in March 2018 in the UK and subsequently on DVD. A Spanish language version was released in 2019, picking up an award at a film festival in the Basque city of San Sebastián. It went on general release in Chile on 6 June 2019, distributed by Miradoc. It became on release the most successful Scottish documentary in UK cinemas, until the release of My Old School in 2022.

== Reception ==
Nae Pasaran won the Best Feature award at the 2018 British Academy Scotland Awards and its director, Felipe Bustos Sierra, was shortlisted for the Best Director (Factual) award. It was also shortlisted in the Best Documentary category in the 2018 British Independent Film Awards.

The film won the Audience Prize at the San Sebastián Human Rights Film Festival in April 2019.
