= Rena Ronson =

American film executive and talent agent

- Occupations: Head of UTA Independent Film Group; Talent agent
- Years active: 1986–present
- Employer: United Talent Agency
- Known for: Packaging and selling independent films (Palm Springs, The Big Sick, Room)

Rena Ronson is an American film executive and talent agent. She serves as the partner and head of the UTA Independent Film Group, a division of United Talent Agency. She is known for negotiating distribution deals for high-profile independent films, including the record-breaking sale of Palm Springs at the 2020 Sundance Film Festival.

== Career ==
Ronson began her career in international sales at Fox Lorber Associates (1986–1991) before moving to Lakeshore Entertainment, where she oversaw the company's international film library.

In 1998, she joined the William Morris Agency (WMA), where she co-headed the William Morris Independent division alongside Cassian Elwes. During her 11-year tenure, she helped institutionalize independent film packaging within a major agency structure, working on films such as Monster's Ball and Thank You for Smoking.

Following the merger of WMA and Endeavor in 2009, Ronson left to join United Talent Agency (UTA) to head its Independent Film Group. Under her leadership, the group has brokered significant sales, including:

- The Big Sick (2017) to Amazon Studios
- I, Tonya (2017) to Neon
- The Farewell (2019) to A24
- Palm Springs (2020) to Hulu and Neon for $17.5 million (plus 69 cents), breaking the Sundance sales record at the time.

== Awards and recognition ==
Ronson has been recognized frequently in industry lists, including The Hollywood Reporter's "Women in Entertainment Power 100" and Variety's "Women's Impact Report." In 2008, she received the Business Leadership Award from Women in Film Los Angeles.
