= Kenmure Street protests =

2021 protest in Glasgow, Scotland

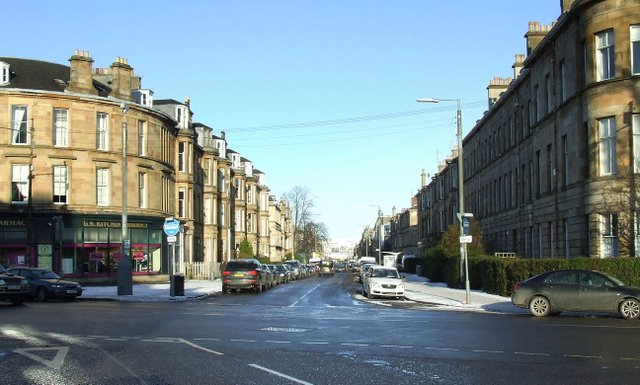
Kenmure Street

On the morning of 13 May 2021, two Sikh men of Indian origin living on Kenmure Street in the Pollokshields area of Glasgow were taken from their home and detained by the Home Office in a van on the street for alleged immigration violations. In response, neighbours and advocates organized a sit-in protest and surrounded the van for eight hours, during which time Police Scotland became involved, until they were released. Immigration advocates criticised the detainment of long-term residents in the community. In addition, the timing of the raid came under scrutiny as it was conducted on the dawn of Eid in a diverse neighborhood with a high concentration of Muslim residents and during the transition of government following the 2021 Scottish Parliament election. The protests also led to a broader debate over whether Scotland should be subject to the United Kingdom's immigration policies, particularly the Home Office hostile environment policy, and statements in support of Scottish independence.

== Background ==
Some claim that there is a tension between the Scottish government and the Home Office regarding "dawn raids". Glasgow is the only "dispersal city" in Scotland for asylum seekers, and in 2005, the Glasgow Girls formed their group to campaign against dawn raids. Starting in the 2010s, the Home Office hostile environment policy has created further tension, with the Scottish National Party, the ruling party of the devolved Scottish Parliament since 2007, proposing that immigration to the country should be another power devolved to Scottish authorities.

The two men detained, Sumit Sehdev and Lakhvir Singh, were Sikhs and Indian nationals in their thirties who had, at the time of the protest, lived in Scotland for ten years but had not been granted leave to remain. The area they live in, Pollokshields, is a home to a large Sikh and Muslim community, located in the Glasgow Southside constituency, which is the constituency of then First Minister and Scottish National Party leader Nicola Sturgeon and considered the most ethnically diverse in Scotland.

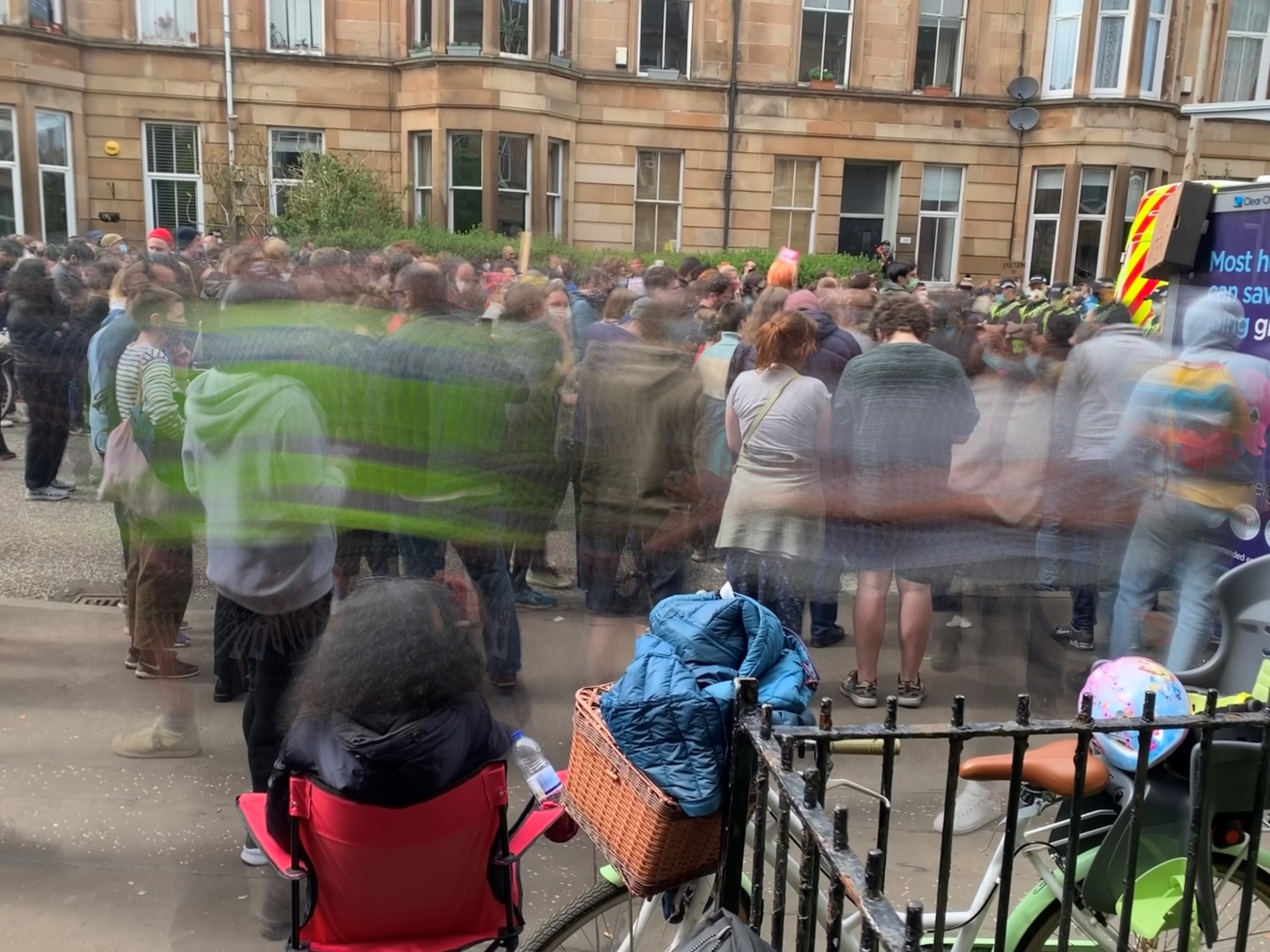
Kenmure Street protest, 13 May 2021

== Events ==
The two men were originally detained around 09:00–09:30 in the morning. Word spread quickly about the situation, which The Guardian attributed to local activist networks, and eventually hundreds of people had surrounded the van. One man, nicknamed "van man" by some outlets, crawled under the van and stayed under it for the duration of the protest to stop it from moving. By 10am, enough protestors had surrounded the van that Police Scotland had to be called in to manage the situation. After being detained for eight hours, the two men were released at 5pm on the request of Police Scotland to restore order and protect the well-being of the protestors and detainees. The men were escorted to a nearby mosque, with crowds following them, where they were let go.

== Reactions ==
Nicola Sturgeon and Scottish Labour leader Anas Sarwar expressed deep concern about the raids. Humza Yousaf, the Justice Secretary, criticised the Home Office for its "reckless action" and timing, and initiated cross-party communications to create an alliance against the UK's migration policies, which he deemed "draconian". The raid occurring on Eid al-Fitr in a community with many Muslim residents was perceived rather negatively, with Nicola Sturgeon calling it "staggeringly irresponsible".

The next day, the Home Office described the protestors as a "mob"; in response, a doorstep vigil against the Home Office's action was planned on 15 May by local activists. Positive Action in Housing, a charity that supports migrants, announced plans to sue the Home Office over the raid.

Howard Beckett, the assistant secretary-general of Unite the Union, made a controversial tweet stating that Home Secretary Priti Patel "should be deported" instead of refugees for her immigration policy decisions; he deleted the tweet and was suspended from Labour.

The Home Office responded by stating that it was "tackling illegal immigration and the harm it causes, often to the most vulnerable people".

Pro-independence publication The National ran the headline "Glasgow 1, 'Team UK' 0". Nationalist columnist Neil Mackay, writing for The Herald, wrote an opinion piece claiming events had done more to advance anti-Union sentiment than pro-Independence politicians due to the involvement of common people and their rejection of UK immigration laws. On the other hand, in a column for The Scotsman, Conservative politician John McLellan criticised the SNP's response, claiming it had raised racial tensions, was hypocritical in light of previous statements against mass gatherings during the COVID-19 pandemic and encouraged the violation of the rule of law. In response to COVID-19 concerns, particularly as Pollokshields had been identified as a COVID-19 hotspot and the protests have been compared to Rangers F.C. celebrations which have drawn crowds of thousands and resulted in disturbances, Yousaf stated that, while all gatherings must be discouraged, it was not fair to compare the "thuggish, loutish behaviour" of the latter with the former.

In December 2021 the protest was identified as one of the top ten protests to make a difference in 2021.

A film account of the protest has been released, Everybody to Kenmure Street.

A play based on the protest, These Are Our Neighbours, was performed at the Citizens Theatre in Glasgow in 2026.
