= Once Upon a Time in Harlem =

2026 American documentary film

- Theatrical release poster
- Directed by: William Greaves; David Greaves
- Produced by: Liani Greaves; Anne de Mare
- Cinematography: David Greaves; Doug Harris; David Hoffman; Jerry Pantzer
- Edited by: Lynn True; Anne de Mare
- Music by: Tamar-kali
- Production company: William Greaves Productions
- Distributed by: Neon
- Release dates: January 25, 2026 (Sundance); October 16, 2026 (United States)
- Running time: 100 minutes
- Country: United States
- Language: English
- Box office: $1 million

Once Upon a Time in Harlem is a 2026 American documentary film directed by William Greaves and David Greaves. It follows a gathering of the surviving members of the Harlem Renaissance in 1972. It remained unfinished for more than fifty years, until David revisited the footage following his father's death.

The film had its world premiere at the Premieres section of the 2026 Sundance Film Festival on January 25. It also screened at the Directors' Fortnight section of the 2026 Cannes Film Festival, where it was nominated for the L'Œil d'or. It was theatrically released in the United States by Neon on October 16 and received widespread acclaim from critics.

== Premise ==
William Greaves presents footage of a 1972 party he convened at Duke Ellington’s townhouse in Harlem with living luminaries of the Harlem Renaissance, an event he regarded as the most important he captured on film. Greaves invited every surviving participant he could locate. Many had not seen one another for decades. Attendees included the painter Aaron Douglas; the artist and writer Richard Bruce Nugent; the poet Arna Bontemps; the musicians Eubie Blake and Noble Sissle; the photographer James Van Der Zee; and Ida Mae Cullen, the widow of Countee Cullen. They also included society editor Gerri Major, poet Frank Horne, artists Romare Bearden and Ernest Crichlow, actor Leigh Whipper, librarians Jean Blackwell Hutson and Regina Anderson, theatrical producer Irvin C. Miller, historians Nathan Huggins and John Henrik Clarke, activist Richard B. Moore, journalist Ted Poston, and writer George Schuyler.

They discuss other key figures who had died including Marcus Garvey, Langston Hughes, Zora Neale Hurston, Claude McKay, Paul Robeson, and Augusta Savage.

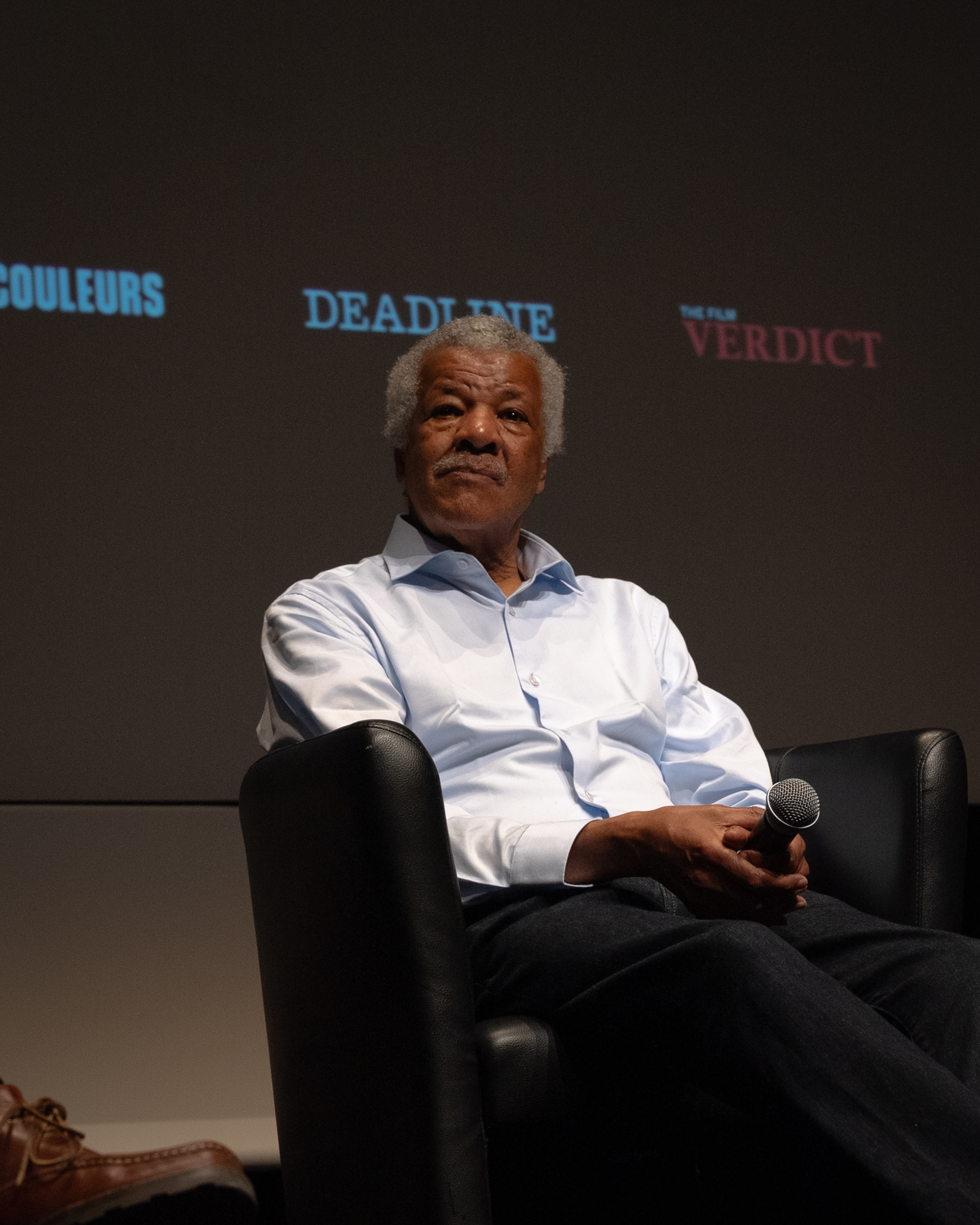
David Greaves at the 2026 Cannes Film Festival

== Production ==
=== Filming ===
Principal photography took place in August 1972, led by independent documentarian and experimental filmmaker William Greaves. Aged 26 at the time, David Greaves was part of the camera crew, working alongside Doug Harris, David Hoffman, and Jerry Pantzer.

The documentary was shot in 16mm film, using a trio of Éclair 16mm NPR (Noiseless Portable Reflex) cameras, alongside a Bolex H16 16mm as a fourth camera. Two sound recordists captured the audio to tape.

=== Restoration ===
After William passed away in 2014, his widow and lifelong creative partner, Louise Archambault Greaves, spend her later years trying to assemble funding for the preservation of his body of work, securing grants from the Ford Foundation, the Cromwell Harbor Foundation, and the Mellon Foundation.

The documentary footage, comprising around 60,000 feet of film (around 30 hours of footage), was only rediscovered 50 years later after being taken out of deep storage. American preservation specialist Bill Brand worked to restore and digitize the original footage during 18 months in New York City. The audio archived in the Schomburg Center for Research in Black Culture in Harlem was resynced to the 4K-scanned film.

The material was later cut by Anne De Mare (also credited as producer) and Lynn True, with color grading by Stewart Griffin, in a process overseen by David Greaves (credited as co-director), and William's granddaughter Liani Greaves (credited as producer).

ElevenLabs software was used to generate 90 seconds of audio in the voice of William Greaves.

== Release ==
Once Upon a Time in Harlem had its world premiere at the 2026 Sundance Film Festival on January 25. In February 2026, Neon acquired U.S. distribution rights to the documentary. It was also selected to the Directors' Fortnight section of the 2026 Cannes Film Festival, where it had its international premiere on May 18, and was nominated for the L'Œil d'or. It was also selected for the 53rd Telluride Film Festival, the Wavelengths section of the 2026 Toronto International Film Festival, and the Main Slate of the 2026 New York Film Festival.

It was theatrically released in the United States by Neon on October 16, 2026.

== Reception ==
=== Critical response ===
On the review aggregator website Rotten Tomatoes, 100% of 85 critics' reviews are positive, with an average rating of 8.9/10. The website's consensus reads: "Director David Greaves finishes what his father started with Once Upon a Time in Harlem, a strikingly immersive glimpse into a unique time and place that feels like getting to bask in a community's collective heart." Metacritic, which uses a weighted average, assigned the film a score of 96 out of 100, based on 23 critics, indicating "universal acclaim".

=== Accolades ===
Award	Date	Category	Recipient(s)	Result	Ref.
Critics' Choice Documentary Awards	November 8, 2026	Best Documentary Feature	Once Upon a Time in Harlem	Nominated	
Critics' Choice Documentary Awards	November 8, 2026	Best First Documentary Feature	David Greaves	Won	
Critics' Choice Documentary Awards	November 8, 2026	Best Editing	Anne de Mare and Lynn True	Nominated	
Critics' Choice Documentary Awards	November 8, 2026	Best Historical Documentary	Once Upon a Time in Harlem	Won	
Critics' Choice Documentary Awards	November 8, 2026	Best Archival Documentary	Once Upon a Time in Harlem	Won	
Gotham Independent Film Awards	November 30, 2026	Best Documentary	David Greaves, Anne de Mare, and Liani Greaves	Pending	
Cinema Eye Honors	January 11, 2027	Outstanding Achievement in Nonfiction Feature Filmmaking	William Greaves, David Greaves, Liani Greaves, Anne de Mare, Tamar-kali, Clive Davidson, Roland Mitchell, Mike Frank, Matthew J. Hoffman, and Bella Racklin	Pending	
Cinema Eye Honors	January 11, 2027	Outstanding Achievement in Editing	Anne de Mare and Lynn True	Pending	
Cinema Eye Honors	January 11, 2027	Outstanding Achievement in Archival Artistry	Anne de Mare, Lynn True, Matthew J. Hoffman, and Bella Racklin	Pending	
