= Felipe Bustos Sierra =

Filmmaker

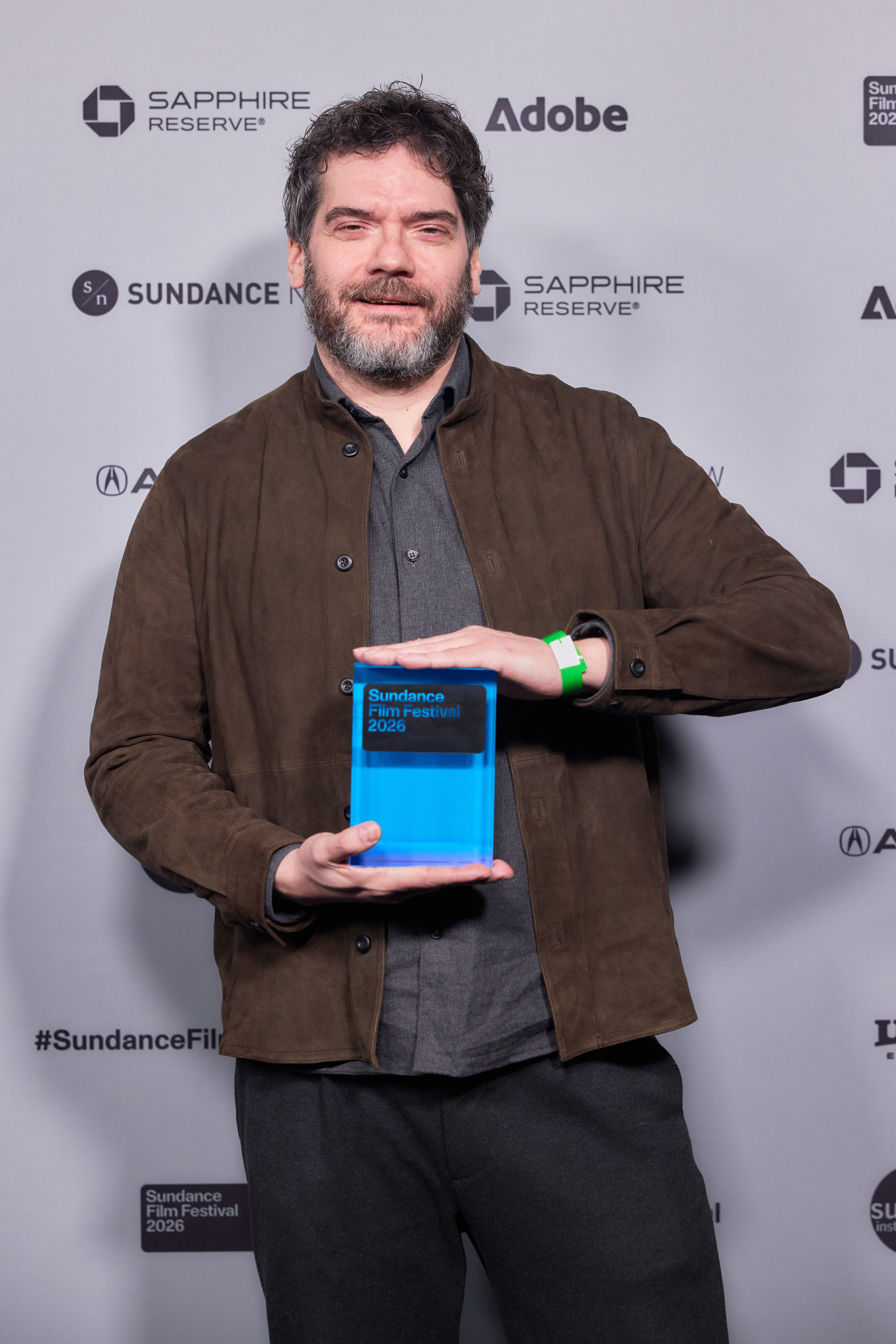
- Occupations: Film director, producer and editor
- Years active: 2010-present

Felipe Bustos Sierra is a Chilean-Belgian film director, producer and editor based in Scotland. His debut feature-length documentary, Nae Pasaran (2018), won the Best Feature award at the 2018 British Academy Scotland Awards, where Bustos Sierra was also nominated for Best Director (Factual). Bustos Sierra is also the founder and creative director of Debasers Filums, an independent film company based in Edinburgh and Glasgow.

== Early life ==
Bustos Sierra is the son of a Chilean journalist who was exiled to Belgium after the 1973 coup d'état. As a child growing up in Brussels, Bustos Sierra attended Chilean solidarity meetings, where he first encountered the stories of Scottish Rolls-Royce plant workers in East Kilbride who, in solidarity with the people of Chile, boycotted servicing the country's fighter jets following the military coup. These stories formed the subject of Bustos Sierra's first feature film, Nae Pasaran.

Bustos Sierra is an alumnus of the Eurodoc, Berlinale Talent Campus, the Independent Filmmaker Programme, and the EIFF Talent Lab.

== Career ==
In 2010, Bustos Sierra founded the independent film company Debasers Filums in Edinburgh, Scotland. One of his early short films, Three-Legged Horses (2012), is based on his experiences as a rickshaw driver in Edinburgh. The film was the first successfully crowdfunded film project in Scotland and went on to screen at over 100 international film festivals, on five continents, winning four awards.

Bustos Sierra was commissioned by the Scottish Documentary Institute's Bridging the Gap scheme to make Nae Pasaran as a short film in 2013. In March 2015, he launched a Kickstarter campaign to raise funds to turn Nae Pasaran into a feature-length film. The resulting documentary received critical acclaim and was nominated for Best Documentary at the British Independent Film Awards in 2018. Bustos Sierra tells the story of the Scots workers who defied Pinochet from the Scottish side, and, following five months of research in Chile, from Chileans—both oppressors and oppressed.

In 2025, Bustos Sierra directed the documentary Everybody to Kenmure Street, which chronicles the 2021 Home Office immigration raid on Kenmure Street in Glasgow’s Pollokshields neighbourhood and the community protest that followed. The film presents a chronological account of the events using crowd-sourced footage, archival material, and dramatised scenes. It was produced by Ciara Barry for the Glasgow-based production company Barry Crerar, with Emma Thompson serving as an executive producer. The film was selected for screening at the Sundance Film Festival in 2026 as part of the World Cinema Documentary Competition, where it won a Special Jury Award for Civil Resistance.

== Filmography ==
Year	Film	Director	Producer
2010	Tixeon (short)	Yes	Yes
2012	Three-Legged Horses (short)	Yes	Yes
2012	Five Six Seven Eight! (short)	Yes	Yes
2013	Nae Pasaran (short)	Yes	No
2018	Nae Pasaran	Yes	Yes
2026	Everybody to Kenmure Street	Yes	Yes
