= How To with John Wilson =

American documentary comedy series

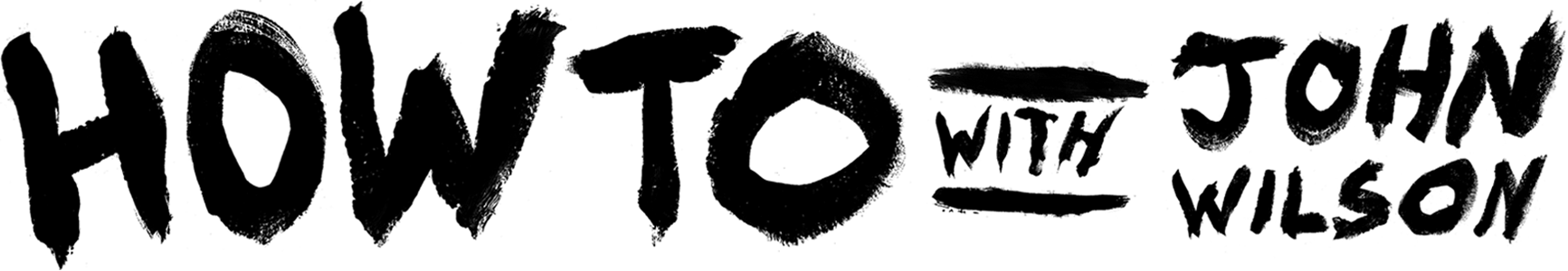
- Genre: Comedy; Docuseries
- Created by: John Wilson
- Written by: John Wilson; Michael Koman; Alice Gregory; Susan Orlean; Conner O'Malley; Allie Viti
- Directed by: John Wilson
- Country of origin: United States
- Original language: English
- No. of seasons: 3
- No. of episodes: 18

Production
- Executive producers: Nathan Fielder; Clark Reinking; John Wilson; Michael Koman
- Producer: Brendan McHugh
- Production location: New York City
- Editor: Adam Locke-Norton
- Running time: 25–37 minutes
- Production companies: HBO Entertainment; Blow Out Productions; John's Movies; Atlantic Pictures

Original release
- Network: HBO
- Release: October 23, 2020 – September 1, 2023

How To with John Wilson is an American television comedy docuseries created by filmmaker John Wilson. The series, executive produced by Nathan Fielder, Michael Koman and Clark Reinking, was ordered by HBO. It premiered on October 23, 2020.

On December 9, 2020, HBO renewed the series for a second season, which premiered on November 26, 2021. In February 2022, the series was renewed for a third season. In May 2023, HBO announced it would premiere on July 28 and be the final season. Wilson said he had decided it would be the last one.

== Premise ==
John Wilson attempts to give advice while dealing with his own personal issues. The 25-minute episodes, framed as tutorials and filmed mainly on the streets of New York City, cover topics from small talk to scaffolding.

Each episode is narrated in a second-person perspective and features numerous shots edited together from hours of B-roll. There is often a road trip, convention or memoir component.

While each episode initially focuses on its title topic, in the course of his investigation, Wilson meets people and strikes up conversations that lead in unpredictable and diverse directions. For example, the episode "How to Improve Your Memory" ends up featuring a conference on the Mandela effect in Ketchum, Idaho.

== Production ==
Wilson explained to Variety his process of making the show:

I try to draft very rough scripts of what might happen in an episode, and then we give it to production and put a plan in action to shoot it—and every single script is rewritten from the ground up by the time we're done in the edit. So much of the rewriting has to happen in the edit, because we're now writing to these shots that we never could have predicted that we would have, and they're always so much better than the stuff that we roughly conceived.

Works that inspired Wilson include the documentaries The Social Life of Small Urban Spaces (1980) by William H. Whyte and The Decline of Western Civilization Part II: The Metal Years (1988).

== Episodes ==
Season	Episodes	Originally released	
Season	Episodes	First released	Last released
1	6	October 23, 2020	November 27, 2020
2	6	November 26, 2021	December 31, 2021
3	6	July 28, 2023	September 1, 2023

=== Season 1 (2020) ===
No. overall	No. in season	Title	Directed by	Written by	Original release date	U.S. viewers (millions)
1	1	"How To Make Small Talk"	John Wilson	John Wilson	October 23, 2020	0.187
While asking people about the future of humanity, John meets an amateur predator catcher who makes a habit of blocking targets that try to open up about their personal lives. As John instructs the viewer on how to end unwanted intimate conversation with the "touch and go" method and discusses "baiting", or presenting in an interesting way to invite conversation, he books a trip to Cancún to have something to talk about, unwittingly going during MTV's Spring Break event. He meets a partygoer named Chris and, after engaging in small talk, ends up discussing their recently deceased friends. John replaces a plant his ex-girlfriend gave him with a photo of him and Chris, concluding that opening up through small talk can be rewarding despite the emotional risk.
2	2	"How To Put Up Scaffolding"	John Wilson	John Wilson, Michael Koman and Alice Gregory	October 30, 2020	0.352
John investigates the abundance of scaffolding in New York, tracing it to the accidental death of college student Grace Gold in 1979 and a subsequent law passed mandating regular inspections for building façades, which made scaffolding a lucrative business. He finds that it is maligned by some residents and used for various purposes by others, including one piece of scaffolding in Sugar Hill that has been up for over twenty years and is accepted as a regular part of the neighborhood. He notes that a new style of scaffolding was voted on in 2009, but it does not solve any issues and is antisocially designed. John travels to a Scaffold & Access Industry Association convention in New Orleans, but is ejected for filming. He notes that the Hard Rock Hotel being constructed at 1031 Canal Street lacks proper scaffolding, and talks to a local who tells him "you're gonna find danger everywhere." After returning to New York, John learns that the hotel collapsed and concludes that proper scaffolding would not have prevented the incident, suggesting that it would be best to find new ways to protect pedestrians.
3	3	"How To Improve Your Memory"	John Wilson	John Wilson, Michael Koman and Alice Gregory	November 6, 2020	0.288
Insecure about his bad memory, John interviews memory champion Yanjaa and uses the "memory palace" technique to memorize his grocery list. Unable to find some items in their usual spots at the store, he meets the creator of the store's inventory software, who is obsessed with the Mandela effect and invites John to a conference for those affected by it in Ketchum, Idaho. After observing how the live broadcast of the Macy's Thanksgiving Day Parade was edited to cut out the malfunction of a Ronald McDonald balloon, thereby creating differing accounts of the event, John goes to the conference, where attendees attribute their false memories to "jumping timelines." John finds solace in having his own memory validated but, when he returns home and goes to write down the conference in his years-long daily journal, rereads it and is uncomfortable realizing his twenties were vastly different than how he remembers them. Deciding that "maybe it's unnatural to try and preserve some things," John goes to stores and tampers with items whose details are frequently misremembered to allow people to have different memories of them.
4	4	"How To Cover Your Furniture"	John Wilson	John Wilson, Michael Koman and Alice Gregory	November 13, 2020	0.273
Fed up with his cat Baby clawing his furniture, John buys a new chair and has it fitted with a plastic cover. He muses on people's attempts to control animals, and how this extends to trying to control humans through hostile architecture. He learns about the practice of commissioning replicas of expensive art so the original can be put in storage, and while going to the pet store to look for a solution, encounters a man who advertises about the dangers of circumcision. He introduces John to a friend of his, who is attempting to regrow his foreskin through a homemade pulley device. John asks his friend's interior designer for advice, who tells him that both the cover and his camera are "protective mechanisms." He decides to create a replica of his chair for Baby to scratch, leaving the original in a storage unit.
5	5	"How To Split the Check"	John Wilson	John Wilson, Michael Koman and Alice Gregory	November 20, 2020	0.231
While analyzing groups of diners to figure out a perfect way to split the check, John recalls when a friend paid for his birthday dinner using a business debit card so it could be written off. An accountant explains that he could theoretically write off purchases by filming them as part of his job, which John does until he considers how not paying taxes hurts working class people employed by the city. He discovers a store that sells referee equipment and, upon learning of a local association's dinner, realizes that they might be able to weigh in on the check issue as people who decide what is fair. However, the dinner's raffle is seemingly rigged in favor of a high-ranking member and an organizer's golden whistle prize is stolen, and John concludes that "a lack of fairness at the top can create chaos at the bottom," encouraging the audience to figure out how to support each other to prevent a need for cheating.
6	6	"How To Cook the Perfect Risotto"	John Wilson	John Wilson, Michael Koman and Alice Gregory	November 27, 2020	0.083
Wanting to repay his landlord "Mama" for regularly cooking dinner for him, John sets out to learn how to make risotto, her favorite dish. After getting advice from his neighbor, he produces several subpar dishes and realizes his frustration may stem from his attempt to quit nicotine. To distract himself, he goes skiing in Colorado and notices that the altitude is pressurizing chip bags, and ends up going on a long hike in an attempt to make one pop on its own. Feeling reenergized and having passed the early stages of quitting, John returns to New York, only for the city to go on lockdown due to the COVID-19 pandemic. Fearing that leaving food for Mama would risk exposing her to the virus, John hesitates on trying again and she has a stroke. Realizing that, due to the suddenly changing nature of the world, it would be better to do the best he can, John leaves risotto for Mama and wonders what the world will look like after lockdown ends, concluding that "we're all gonna have to figure it out together."

=== Season 2 (2021) ===
No. overall	No. in season	Title	Directed by	Written by	Original release date	U.S. viewers (millions)
7	1	"How To Invest in Real Estate"	John Wilson	John Wilson, Michael Koman, Alice Gregory, Susan Orlean, and Conner O'Malley	November 26, 2021	0.118
Mama decides to sell the apartment building and offers it to John for below market value. Anxious about committing to the hefty purchase, John interviews various landlords and learns from a mortgage broker that the freelance nature of his job makes him ineligible for a loan, and that he must become a landlord himself to prove that he has a steady income. Unsure if he is up to the responsibility, John interviews a man who helps landlords evict tenants for a living, who tells him landlords cannot be friends with their tenants and exhibits a tense relationship with his own landlord. John also interviews a man who acts as a landlord in the game Second Life, and concludes that the occupation might "cost you a piece of your humanity." He meets a ventriloquist on the Staten Island Ferry and realizes that the man is able to say harsh things through the medium of his dummy, deciding to purchase the building and a dummy of his own in case he needs to have a difficult conversation with future tenants.
8	2	"How To Appreciate Wine"	John Wilson	John Wilson, Michael Koman, Susan Orlean, and Conner O'Malley	December 3, 2021	0.068
Wondering why his wine is always the last opened at parties, John decides to immerse himself in its culture. Concerned about "consuming a piece of history," he meets a household of people who habitually eat out of date foods and is given some MRE rations from the Vietnam War. After a wine expert shows John how easily he can be misled by the culture's elite nature, he sees this in action when he attends a wine tasting event and finds himself compelled to agree with things he doesn't understand. John recalls how, in his first year of college at Binghamton University, he joined an a capella group that was invited to a conference led by Keith Raniere, who they discovered was the leader of the NXIVM cult and was using the conference to groom students into joining. As John wonders if wine culture would allow people to similarly exploit him, he stumbles upon a Bang Energy promotional event in Fort Lauderdale and finds that energy drinks are easier to socialize over. He visits the nearby mansion of Bang CEO Jack Owoc, who eagerly shows John around when he learns he is with HBO and reveals his cult-like following. John decides he does not need to force himself to be someone he is not, and brings some Bang and the rations to a friend's party.
9	3	"How To Find a Spot"	John Wilson	John Wilson, Michael Koman, Alice Gregory, Susan Orlean, and Conner O'Malley	December 10, 2021	0.079
As John employs several unsuccessful strategies to find a parking spot near his apartment, he manages to luck into one right outside and grows anxious about forfeiting it. He notes how New Yorkers are often obsessive about reserving public spaces and wonders if the problem stems from the overabundance of cars, attending a parking industry expo but discovering that they are only interested in making money instead of solving issues. John visits an elderly couple who have purchased a cemetery plot in anticipation of their deaths and, while there, finds a brochure for a business that makes car-shaped coffins. The owner points him towards a customer in New Jersey who runs a funeral home, who shows John his collection of taxidermied animals he hunted, explaining that the thrill comes from the pursuit of his goal as opposed to the killing. John concludes that the act of parking is more about the satisfaction of finding a spot, and takes a chunk of concrete from a spot he parks in to hang on his wall.
10	4	"How To Throw Out Your Batteries"	John Wilson	John Wilson, Michael Koman, Alice Gregory, Susan Orlean, and Conner O'Malley	December 17, 2021	0.069
Confused about how to throw out used batteries and unable to find a place to put them, John notes a habit of New Yorkers to leave hard to dispose of items on the sidewalk for sanitation workers, including a locked safe that has been in his neighborhood for years. John recalls how he made a feature-length film in high school titled Jingle Berry, which was maligned by his friends and parents and he destroyed every copy of except for one. A conversation with a man who lost his leg and kept it to display the bone inspires John to rewatch the movie, but this only presses him to get rid of it. He asks a woman how to get rid of "toxic material" and she tells him about a project to create a new universal symbol to warn people of radioactive waste, and he recounts how he used to live on a street in Ridgewood that was a former nuclear dumping ground. He visits Randall's Island, where the city moves all of its released sex offenders, and witnesses the destruction caused by the high rates of untreated mental illness. John decides that he cannot continue to live with his shame over Jingle Berry and adds it to his Wikipedia page, placing the last copy in a safe that he leaves in the street with the new symbol for nuclear waste spray-painted on it.
11	5	"How To Remember Your Dreams"	John Wilson	John Wilson, Michael Koman, Susan Orlean, and Conner O'Malley	December 24, 2021	0.049
John starts keeping a journal to keep track of his dreams, specifically recalling one where he goes to a laundromat where the machines are replaced with stoves. He recalls being rejected from joining his childhood friend group's Dungeons & Dragons games because of his literal-mindedness, sparking his interest in nonfiction, and his dreams start to get more intense, leading to a fight with his girlfriend. To ground himself, he visits the office of WINS, his favorite radio station, but finds that they are droll behind the scenes and sneak in more ads than he realized. Wanting to engage with fiction, he visits a comic book shop and meets a fan of the movie Avatar, who belongs to a local fan group. John attends a meeting, where the group discusses how their inability to live on the film's fictional moon of Pandora depresses them, but affirm that they are also grateful for the escapism of the movie allowing them to find each other. John constructs the stove laundromat in real life "to bring other people together" and enjoys watching locals interact with it.
12	6	"How To Be Spontaneous"	John Wilson	John Wilson, Michael Koman, Alice Gregory, Susan Orlean, and Conner O'Malley	December 31, 2021	0.114
John struggles with the fact that "spontaneous" behavior is often planned out and commits to being fully spontaneous by avoiding making a reservation anywhere, but this goes wrong when he gets waylaid going to Rockaway Beach and is turned away when he takes his girlfriend to get a couple's massage, having not made a reservation. He recalls how his father would often take him to places that would unexpectedly be closed, an experience which he believes motivated his avoidance towards making plans as an adult. John decides to visit Mama in Las Vegas unannounced, but she is not home when he stops by and he wanders the city, finding that the town's reputation for unexpected behavior is seemingly a farce. He winds up at an event for convention planners and notices how confident everyone there is, and after being invited to the afterparty and enjoying himself, he commits to making plans. He schedules time to meet with Mama and enjoys her company before returning to New York, where he gets on a random train and winds up at Rockaway Beach.

=== Season 3 (2023) ===
No. overall	No. in season	Title	Directed by	Written by	Original release date
13	1	"How To Find a Public Restroom"	John Wilson	John Wilson and Michael Koman	July 28, 2023
John examines the poor state of public restrooms and notes New Yorkers's habit of leaving bottles filled with urine on the street. While finding a bathroom near the art installation Vessel, John is nearly arrested for filming the structure and expresses frustration at the increasingly blurred line between public and private spaces in the city. His toilet breaks and he is forced to access people's bathrooms however he can until it is fixed. After using the bathroom of a woman who is going to Burning Man, he tags along but is legally barred from using his footage because the crew of the documentary series The Man Will Burn have purchased exclusive filming rights for the year. On his way back to New York, he interviews a man who installs septic tanks that reveals he plans to move his family into an abandoned missile silo on the property. He points John to the decommissioned bunker built for Congress under the Greenbrier as part of Project Greek Island, where he is given a tour and uses the bathroom there. He returns home and leaves a replica of Vessel made from urine bottles in front of the structure, "because if all our public spaces are eventually gonna become private, then we should all get used to seeing our private stuff in public."
14	2	"How To Clean Your Ears"	John Wilson	John Wilson and Michael Koman	August 4, 2023
John has his earwax removed and discovers he can hear better, but soon finds the noise of the city overbearing. He interviews people whose sleep is disrupted by sources of noise they live near, as well as people who make noise late at night. While interviewing people who are bothered by other types of pollution in the city, a woman who is anti-5G tells him about Green Bank, West Virginia, located in the National Radio Quiet Zone. He visits and first sees the community there as tight-knit, but when he interviews several electrosensitive residents he discovers that resentment is still present amongst them. The landowner of a commune for the electrosensitive says he believes moving into a remote area will not solve their problems, and John decides he can accept the noise of New York because of his love for the city.
15	3	"How To Work Out"	John Wilson	John Wilson and Michael Koman	August 11, 2023
John becomes envious of a muscular flight attendant and commits to working out. He sees a poster for a 9/11-themed bodybuilding competition at his gym and attends, discovering that many of the men there struggle with their mental health over the pressures of their sport. He meets the personal trainer of 9/11 hijacker Ziad Jarrah, who disavows Jarrah's actions but admits he was impressed by his commitment, and John reflects on his uncompetitive nature when it comes to his filmmaking, despite being somewhat bothered by losing the Primetime Emmy Award for Outstanding Writing for a Nonfiction Programming in 2022. He gives a speech at Binghamton but finds it difficult to relate to the students there. As he drives back he encounters a man who competitively grows large pumpkins and, though the man loses a local competition, John is impressed by his humbleness and determination to keep trying, and plants pumpkin seeds of his own when he returns home.
16	4	"How To Watch the Game"	John Wilson	John Wilson, Michael Koman and Allie Viti	August 18, 2023
Insecure about being unable to relate to his friends, John accepts an invitation to a game by the New York Mets' PR manager. The game gets rained out so he visits the home of a fan he meets, where they watch tapes of O. J. Simpson's football games, inspiring John to go to a Buffalo Bills game. He is unable to get a ticket and attends a tailgate party, but finds it insular and hard to understand. As he cleans his apartment in anticipation of his friends joining him to watch a game, his vacuum breaks and he takes it for repair, where he finds a flyer for a convention for vacuum collectors in Scranton, Pennsylvania. He goes there and is intrigued by the competitions they hold, and finds that many attendees were embarrassed by their interest as children and tie memories of their deceased loved ones to their love of vacuums, causing John to reflect on how he never connected with his late grandmother. As the convention ends, he notes that the community is much more close and friendly than that of bigger sports, and goes to his grandmother's house and uses her vacuum.
17	5	"How To Watch Birds"	John Wilson	John Wilson and Michael Koman	August 25, 2023
Curious about birdwatching, John joins a group and learns the community is very serious about liars. He goes to a polygraph specialist and is caught telling several lies, recalling how he complied with HBO's requirement of filming for one day on a sound stage for tax reasons by replicating and using someone else's real shot of a flooded bathroom, and how the authenticity of the show has been questioned on other occasions. Wanting to prove himself as an honest documentarian, he sets out to make a documentary about the Titanic and comes across the conspiracy theory that its sister ship Olympic was sunk in its place as an insurance scam. He travels to Tennessee to meet author Bruce Beveridge, who wrote a book on the theory, and while there starts receiving anonymous, threatening emails directing him to meet at a Best Western. He has Bruce drive him there and, while waiting, tells him about faking the shot. Bruce, a former police sergeant, implies having falsified evidence before and warns John to not tell anyone his secrets. John goes alone to the meeting spot and finds no one there, only for Bruce's car to explode with Bruce implied to have been inside; however, he is seen smiling and laughing in another shot. John returns home, claiming that "the world might not be ready" for the truth of the incident, "because the world needs its illusions, and who are you to take that away from them?"
18	6	"How To Track Your Package"	John Wilson	John Wilson and Michael Koman	September 1, 2023
John's delivery of E.T. memorabilia goes missing and he interviews people who use security cameras to catch package thieves, learning from a woman the care with which biological material is treated by shippers. He asks his team to arrange an interview with an organ shipping company, but is mistakenly scheduled to talk to a man who ships the musical instruments. He follows an instrument delivery to Arizona and meets Mike Perry, an employee of cryonics organization Alcor, and attends their fiftieth anniversary event. John notes that the company does not know how to resurrect its frozen clients yet and wonders if they would be able to make a new life in the hypothetical future they would live in, concerned that they spend their lives hoping for a second chance that will never come if the science turns out to be impossible. He asks Mike if he believes it is selfish to not have children, and Mike reveals that he castrated himself out of disgust towards his own sexual impulses and hopes his ancestors can be revived alongside him in the future. As John returns home, his parents receive a postcard from his long-dead aunt that was apparently lost in the mail for decades, and he reflects on the parts of New York that stay the same regardless of the passage of time, stating that "the city is a reflection of who we are." Instead of his usual outro of "This is John Wilson, thanks for watching" he ends the episode thanking the audience for "watching my movies."

== Reception ==
=== Critical response ===
Critical response of How To with John Wilson
Season	Rotten Tomatoes	Metacritic
1	100% (26 reviews)	84 (7 reviews)
2	100% (6 reviews)	92 (4 reviews)
3	100% (14 reviews)	93 (9 reviews)

How To with John Wilson has received critical acclaim. On Rotten Tomatoes, the first season has a score of 100% with an average rating of 7.8/10 based on 26 reviews. The site's critical consensus reads: "Surprising, thoughtful, and superbly strange, How To with John Wilson's blend of documentary styles comes together to create a singularly delightful experience." On Metacritic, the first season has a weighted average score of 84 out of 100, based on 7 reviews, indicating "universal acclaim".

Daniel Fienberg of The Hollywood Reporter wrote How To with John Wilson is "funny, sad, and, in the end, shockingly profound." Steve Greene of IndieWire gave the series a positive review of an A−, saying it has "a hint of darkness and a wealth of empathy."

The second season received critical acclaim. On Rotten Tomatoes, the season has a score of 100% with an average rating of 9/10 based on 6 reviews. On Metacritic, the season has a weighted average score of 92 out of 100, based on 4 reviews, indicating "universal acclaim".

The third season received critical acclaim. On Rotten Tomatoes, the season has a score of 100% with an average rating of 9.4/10 based on 14 reviews. On Metacritic, the season has a weighted average score of 93 out of 100, based on 9 reviews, indicating "universal acclaim".

=== Accolades ===
Year	Award	Category	Recipient(s)	Result	Ref.
2021	American Cinema Editors	Best Edited Non-Scripted Series	Adam Locke-Norton	Nominated	
2021	Gotham Awards	Breakthrough Nonfiction Series	Nathan Fielder, Michael Koman, Clark Reinking, and John Wilson	Nominated	
2021	Cinema Eye Honors	Outstanding Anthology Series	Nathan Fielder, Michael Koman, Clark Reinking, and John Wilson	Nominated	
2021	Cinema Eye Honors	Outstanding Broadcast Editing	Adam Locke-Norton	Won	
2022	TCA Awards	Outstanding Achievement in News and Information	How To with John Wilson	Nominated	
2022	Writers Guild of America Awards	Best Comedy/Variety – Sketch Series	Alice Gregory, Michael Koman, Conner O'Malley, Susan Orlean, and John Wilson	Nominated	
2022	Primetime Emmy Awards	Outstanding Writing for a Nonfiction Program	John Wilson, Michael Koman, Susan Orlean, and Conner O'Malley (for "How To Appreciate Wine")	Nominated	
2022	Cinema Eye Honours	Outstanding Anthology Series	Nathan Fielder, Michael Koman, Clark Reinking and John Wilson	Won	
2022	Cinema Eye Honours	Outstanding Broadcast Editing	Adam Locke-Norton	Nominated	
2024	Primetime Creative Arts Emmy Awards	Outstanding Hosted Nonfiction Series or Special	John Wilson, Nathan Fielder, Michael Koman, Clark Reinking, Shirel Kozak	Nominated	
2024	Primetime Creative Arts Emmy Awards	Primetime Emmy Award for Outstanding Writing for a Nonfiction Programming	John Wilson, Michael Koman, and Allie Viti (for "How to Watch the Game")	Nominated	
