= Robert Chang =

American scientist (1941 or 1942 – 2025)

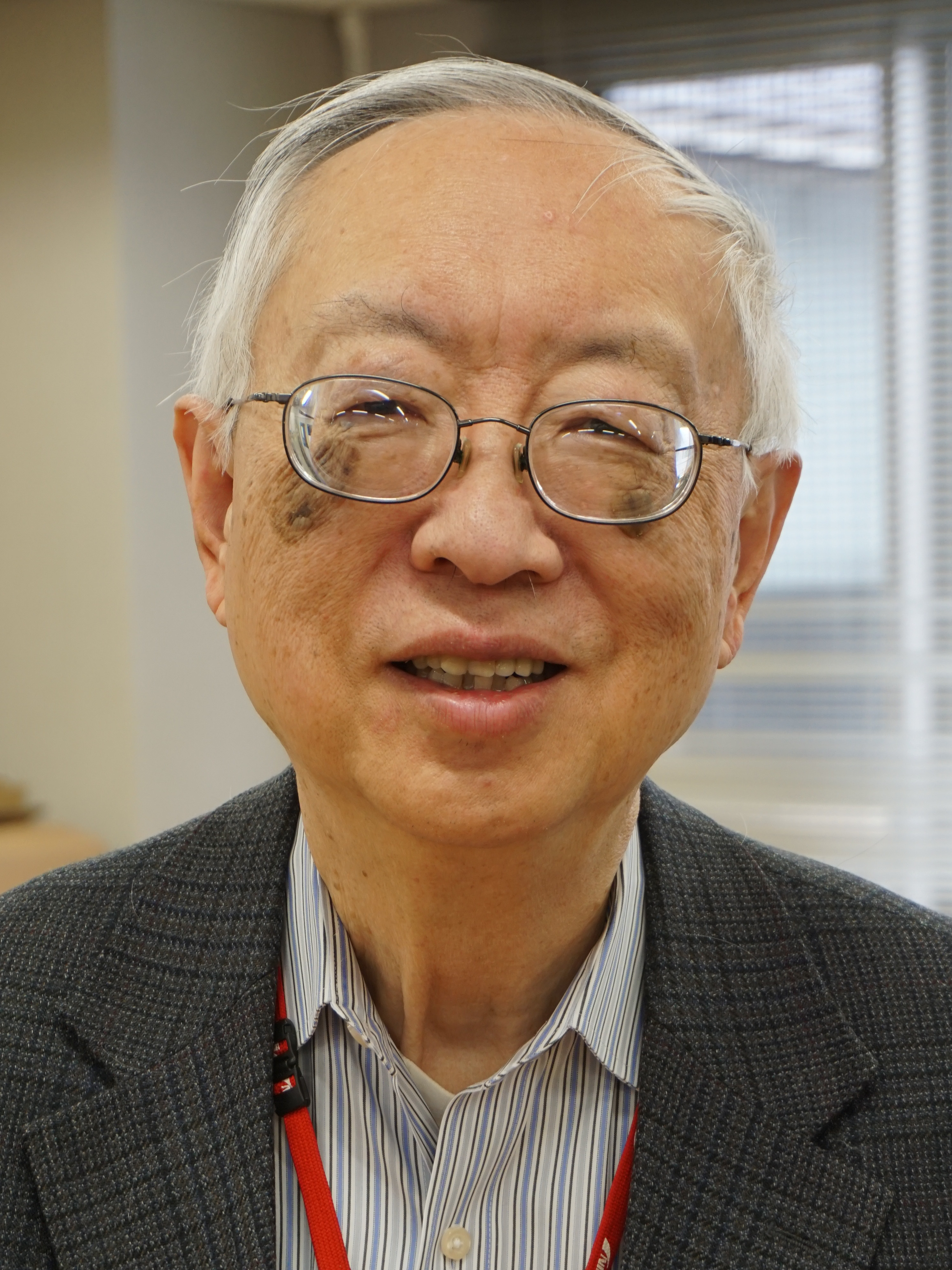
- Chang in 2019
- Born: 1941 or 1942
- Died: June 21, 2025 (aged 83)
- Education: Princeton University
- Scientific career
- Fields: Materials science
- Workplaces: Princeton University

Robert P. H. Chang (1941 or 1942 – June 21, 2025) was an American materials scientist who served as the president of the Materials Research Society (1989) and as a general secretary and president of the International Union of Materials Research Societies (IUMRS). Latterly, Chang headed the Materials Research Institute at Northwestern University. He was a member of advisory boards of the National Institute for Materials Science and of the journal Science and Technology of Advanced Materials. Chang died on June 21, 2025, at the age of 83.

== Selected publications ==
According to the Google Scholar, Chang has co-authored over 500 articles with over 36,000 citations overall. Here are the top cited ones:

- High-performance bulk thermoelectrics with all-scale hierarchical architectures, K Biswas, J He, ID Blum, CI Wu, TP Hogan, DN Seidman, VP Dravid, Nature 489 (7416), 414-418
- Cao, H.; Zhao, Y. G.; Ho, S. T.; Seelig, E. W.; Wang, Q. H.; Chang, R. P. H. (1999). "Random Laser Action in Semiconductor Powder". Physical Review Letters. 82 (11): 2278–2281. Bibcode:1999PhRvL..82.2278C. doi:10.1103/PhysRevLett.82.2278.
- Hao, Feng; Stoumpos, Constantinos C.; Cao, Duyen Hanh; Chang, Robert P. H.; Kanatzidis, Mercouri G. (2014). "Lead-free solid-state organic–inorganic halide perovskite solar cells". Nature Photonics. 8 (6): 489–494. Bibcode:2014NaPho...8..489H. doi:10.1038/nphoton.2014.82. S2CID 5850501.
- Chung, In; Lee, Byunghong; He, Jiaqing; Chang, Robert P. H.; Kanatzidis, Mercouri G. (2012). "All-solid-state dye-sensitized solar cells with high efficiency". Nature. 485 (7399): 486–489. Bibcode:2012Natur.485..486C. doi:10.1038/nature11067. PMID 22622574. S2CID 4420558.
- Irwin, M. D.; Buchholz, D. B.; Hains, A. W.; Chang, R. P. H.; Marks, T. J. (2008). "P-Type semiconducting nickel oxide as an efficiency-enhancing anode interfacial layer in polymer bulk-heterojunction solar cells". Proceedings of the National Academy of Sciences. 105 (8): 2783–2787. Bibcode:2008PNAS..105.2783I. doi:10.1073/pnas.0711990105. PMC 2268537.
- Anomalous band gap behavior in mixed Sn and Pb perovskites enables broadening of absorption spectrum in solar cells F Hao, CC Stoumpos, RPH Chang, MG Kanatzidis Journal of the American Chemical Society 136 (22), 8094-8099
- Fabrication of ZnO nanorods and nanotubes in aqueous solutions ..., Y Li, H Zhang, TJ Marks, RPH Chang - Chemistry of ..., 2005 - ACS Publications
- A nanotube-based field-emission flat panel display ..., JY Dai, EW Seelig, RPH Chang - Applied Physics ..., 1998 - aip.scitation.org
