= Conic (company) =

Conic Films Limited
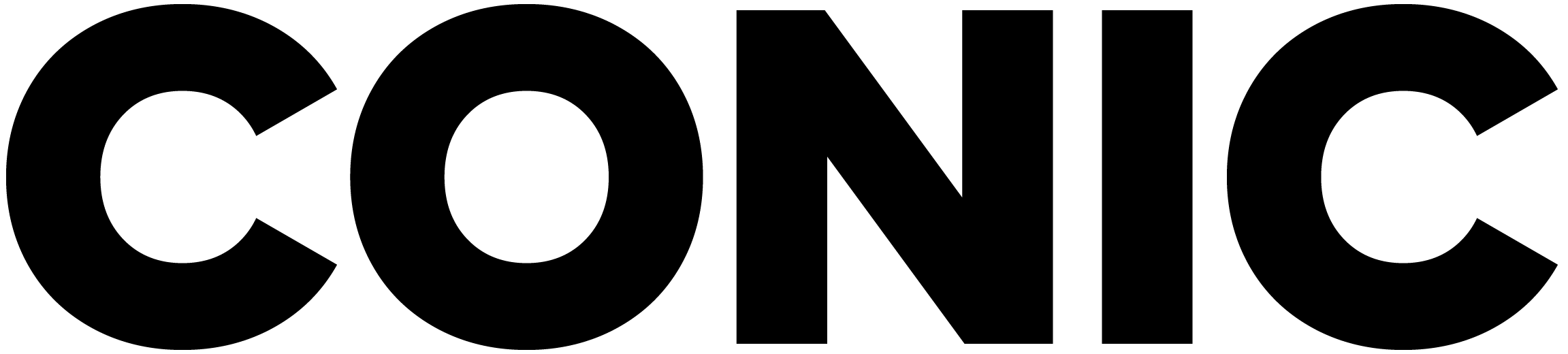
- Type: Private
- Industry: Film distribution
- Founded: July 19, 2022; 4 years ago in Glasgow, Scotland
- Website: https://conic.film

Conic is a British independent film distribution company based in Glasgow, Scotland, releasing narrative and documentary films in the United Kingdom and Ireland.

Founded in 2022 by industry veterans Graham Fulton and Jen Davies, the company has distributed over 30 films including Utama (2022), Smoke Sauna Sisterhood (2023) and Holy Cow (2024).
