= John Wilson (filmmaker) =

American documentary filmmaker (born 1986)

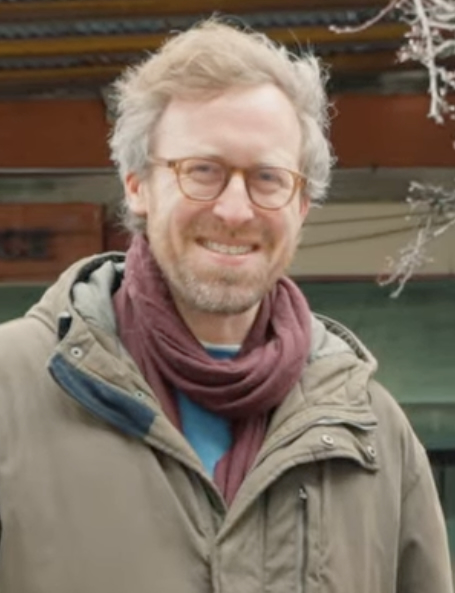
- Wilson in 2026
- Born: John Michael Wilson; October 7, 1986 (age 40); New York City, U.S.
- Education: Binghamton University

Comedy career
- Years active: 2008–present
- Medium: Documentary; television
- Website: johnsmovies.com

John Michael Wilson (born October 7, 1986) is an American documentary filmmaker. He is the creator and director of How To with John Wilson (2020–2023), a comedy-docuseries on HBO and the 2026 documentary film The History of Concrete.

== Early life and education ==
Wilson was born in Astoria, Queens, and grew up in Rocky Point, on the North Shore of Long Island. He became interested in film as a teenager when his father gave him a movie camera. Wilson cites Les Blank, George Kuchar, and Bruce Brown as influences.

Shortly after graduating from high school, Wilson completed a feature film called Jingle Berry. He added the reference to Jingle Berry to his own Wikipedia page in season 2, episode 4 of How To with John Wilson.

While attending Binghamton University, Wilson made a short documentary, Looner, about a balloon fetish community. At Binghamton, Wilson joined an a cappella singing group, the Binghamton Crosbys. The group attended a summit, which they didn't realize was hosted by the NXIVM cult.

== Career ==
In 2008, after graduating from college, Wilson worked for a private investigator. He has said this experience influenced his focus on the people and places of everyday life.

In 2015, Wilson was asked to go on tour with David Byrne to make an original film about his performance. Titled Temporary Color, the film has been called a "true crime concert doc about David Byrne and a pair of violent criminals". The next year, Vimeo asked Wilson to make a documentary about the Sundance Film Festival. These works caught the attention of comedian and writer Nathan Fielder, and the two started collaborating after meeting in 2018.

In October 2020, Wilson's comedy docuseries How To with John Wilson premiered on HBO. The series' second season premiered in November 2021, and its third and final season premiered in July 2023. The show is executive produced by Fielder, Michael Koman, and Clark Reinking. The 25-minute episodes, framed as tutorials and filmed mainly on the streets of New York City, cover mundane topics such as small talk and scaffolding. Each episode is narrated in a second-person perspective, and features numerous shots edited together from hours of B-roll. In the show, Wilson attempts to give advice while dealing with his own personal issues. Stuart Heritage (The Guardian) describes the show as "a tremendous example of documentary as memoir."

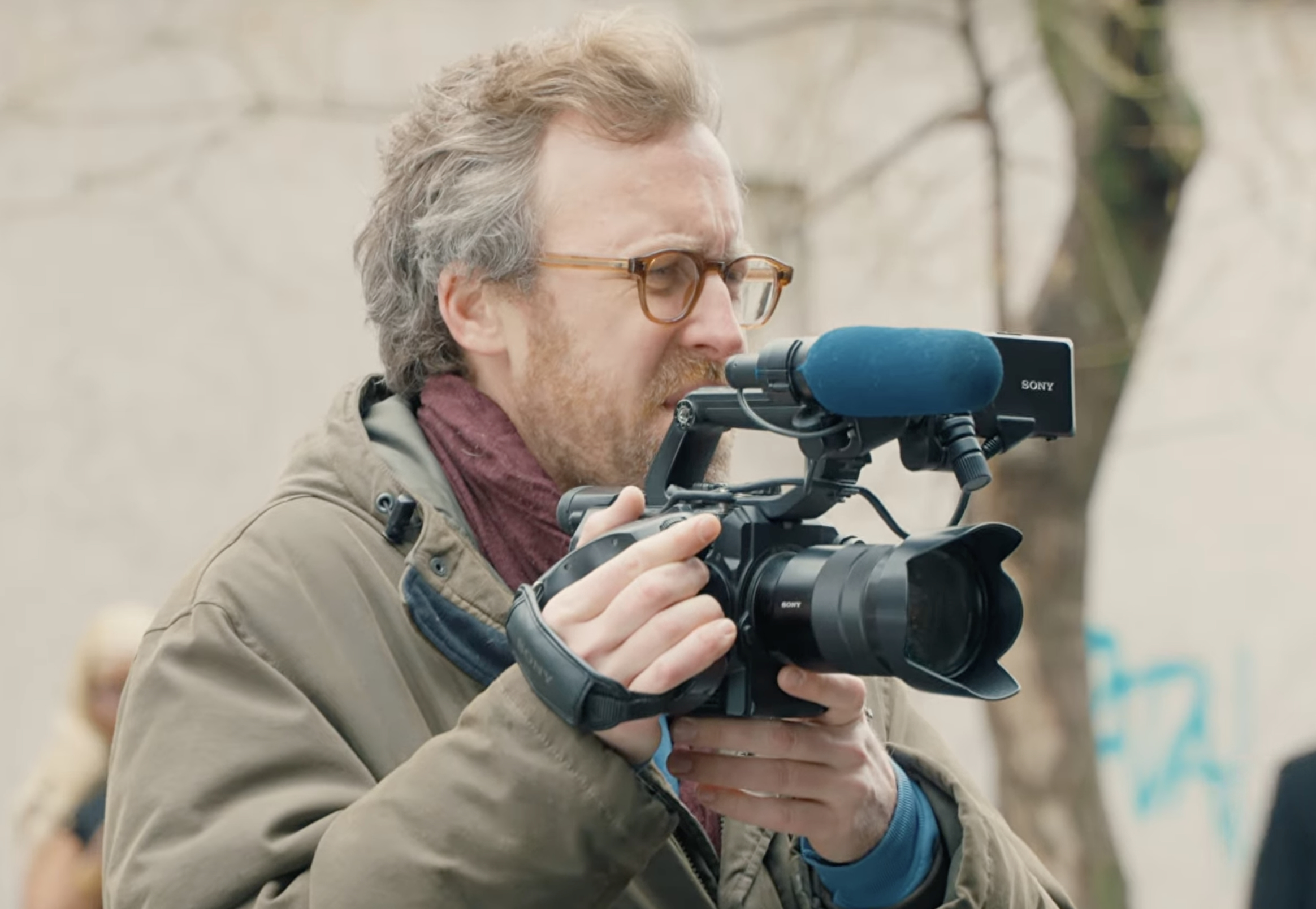
Wilson filming a video with New York City Mayor Zohran Mamdani in 2026

In May 2025, along with business partners Cosmo Bjorkenheim and Davis Fowlkes, Wilson opened Low Cinema, a single-screen repertory theater in Ridgewood, Queens, where he lives.

His first feature documentary, The History of Concrete, premiered at the 2026 Sundance Film Festival on January 22, 2026. The film follows Wilson, after the conclusion of his HBO series, as he attempts to make a documentary about concrete using the formula of a Hallmark movie. It is executive produced by Josh Safdie, Eli Bush, and Ronald Bronstein, all previous collaborators on How To with John Wilson. The film received positive reviews from critics, including Variety and The Hollywood Reporter, and was acquired by Magnolia Pictures for North American distribution in March 2026, and had a limited cinema release on September 18, 2026.
