= Jonathan Redmond =

Irish film editor

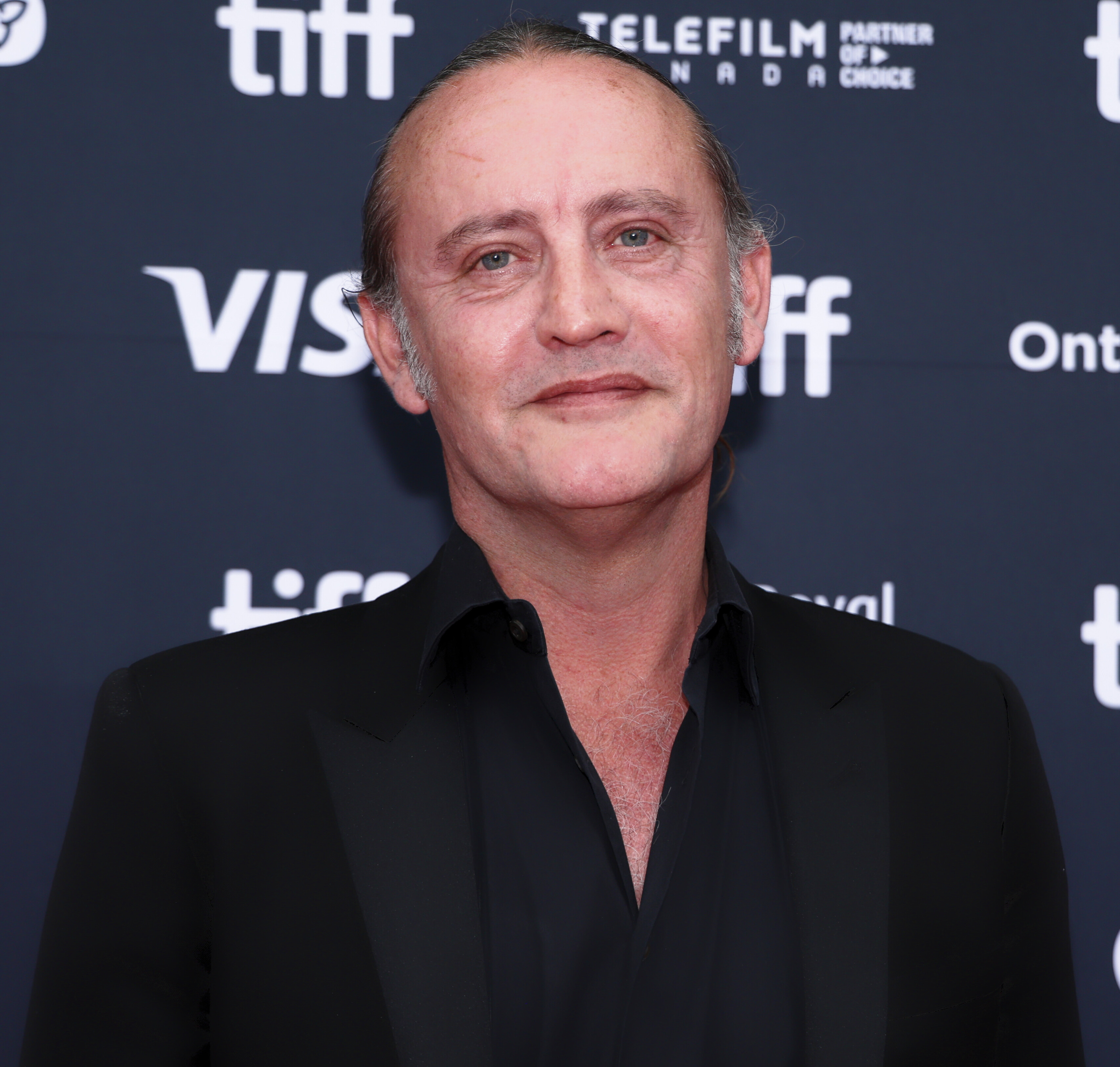
- Occupation: Film editor

Jonathan Redmond is an Irish film editor. He was nominated for an Academy Award in the category Best Film Editing for the film Elvis.

== Selected filmography ==
- The Great Gatsby (2013)
- ERDEM x H&M: The Secret Life of Flowers (2017)
- Elvis (2022; co-nominated with Matt Villa)
