= Critics Choice Documentary Awards =

American annual filmmaking awards

Critics Choice Documentary Award
- Current: 11th Critics' Choice Documentary Awards
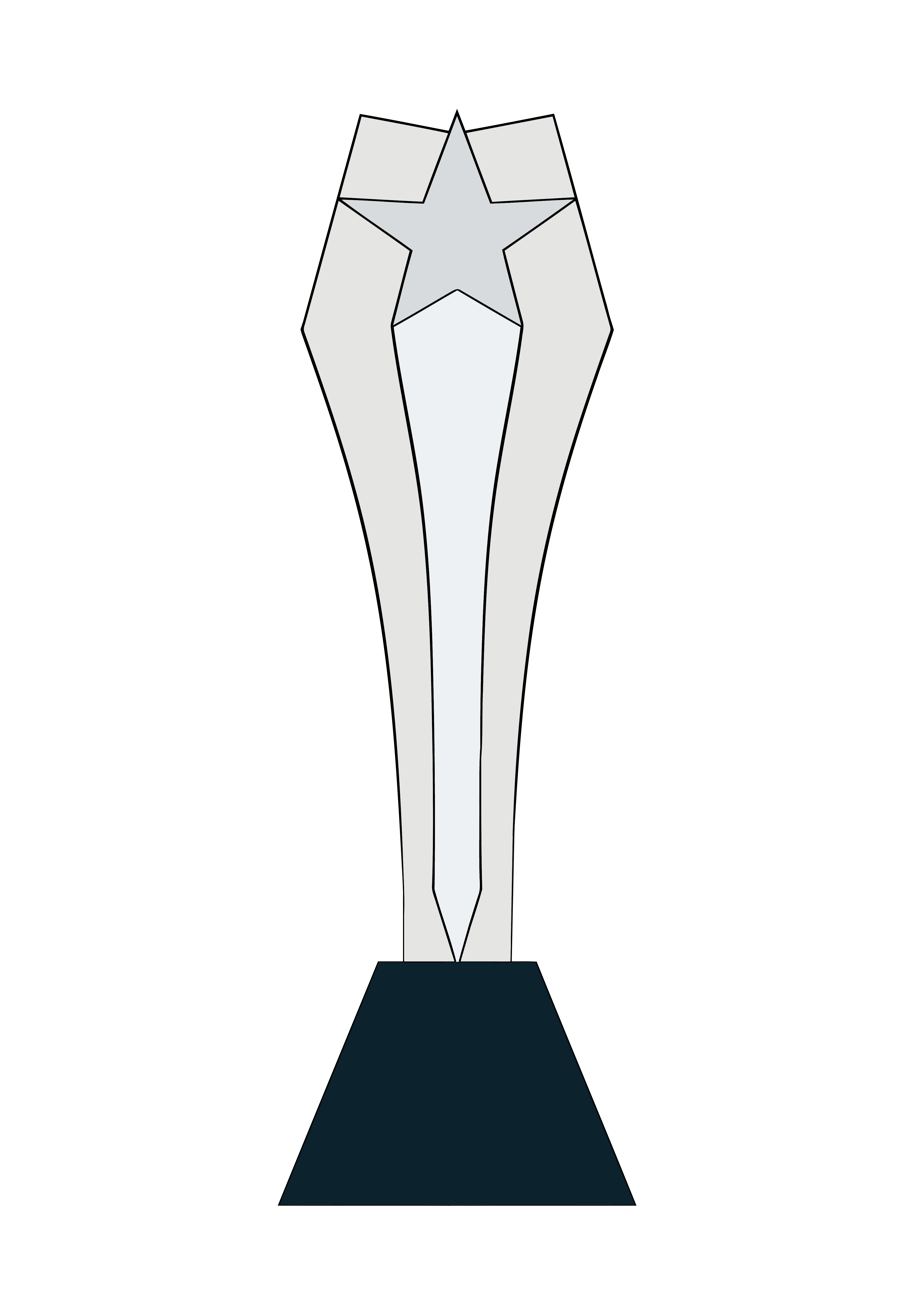
- Description: Best in documentary filmmaking
- Country: United States
- Presented by: Critics Choice Association
- First award: 2016
- Website: criticschoice.com

The Critics Choice Documentary Awards are accolades that are presented by the Critics Choice Association to honour the finest achievements in documentary filmmaking and non-fiction television. They were established in 2016, and the first ceremony was held on November 3, 2016.

== Categories ==
=== Current categories ===
For the latest ceremony, the following categories were presented:

- Best Documentary Feature
- Best Director
- Best First Documentary Feature
- Best Music Documentary
- Best Narration
- Best Archival Documentary
- Best Short Documentary
- Best Political Documentary
- Best Sports Documentary
- Best Historical Documentary
- Best Biographical Documentary
- Best Science/Nature Documentary
- Best True Crime Documentary
- Best Score
- Best Editing
- Best Cinematography
- Best Short Documentary

Other categories previously presented include:

- Best Limited Documentary Series
- Best Ongoing Documentary Series
- D. A. Pennebaker Award (formerly known as the Lifetime Award)
- Critics Choice Impact Award

=== Discontinued categories ===
- Best Song in a Documentary
- Most Innovative Documentary
- Landmark Award

== Ceremonies ==
The following is a listing of all Critics' Choice Documentary Awards ceremonies since 2016.

Ceremony	Date	Best Documentary Feature winner	Best Director winner	Best First Documentary Feature winner	Venue
1st	November 3, 2016	30 for 30: O.J.: Made in America	Ezra Edelman – O.J.: Made in America	Weiner	BRIC, Brooklyn, New York, United States
2nd	November 2, 2017	Jane	Evgeny Afineevsky – Cries from Syria	Kedi	BRIC, Brooklyn, New York, United States
3rd	November 11, 2018	Won't You Be My Neighbor?	Morgan Neville – Won't You Be My Neighbor?	Science Fair	BRIC, Brooklyn, New York, United States
4th	November 10, 2019	Apollo 11	Peter Jackson – They Shall Not Grow Old / Steven Bognar and Julia Reichert – American Factory	Honeyland	BRIC, Brooklyn, New York, United States
5th	November 16, 2020	Dick Johnson Is Dead	Kirsten Johnson – Dick Johnson Is Dead	Mr. Soul!	Virtual
6th	November 14, 2021	Summer of Soul (...Or, When the Revolution Could Not Be Televised)	Elizabeth Chai Vasarhelyi and Jimmy Chin – The Rescue / Ahmir "Questlove" Thompson – Summer of Soul (...Or, When the Revolution Could Not Be Televised)	Summer of Soul (...Or, When the Revolution Could Not Be Televised)	BRIC, Brooklyn, New York, United States
7th	November 13, 2022	Good Night Oppy	Ryan White – Good Night Oppy	Bad Axe	Edison Ballroom, New York City, United States
8th	November 12, 2023	Still: A Michael J. Fox Movie	Davis Guggenheim - Still: A Michael J. Fox Movie	20 Days in Mariupol	Edison Ballroom, New York City, United States
9th	November 10, 2024	Super/Man: The Christopher Reeve Story / Will & Harper	Ian Bonhôte & Peter Ettedgui – Superman: The Christopher Reeve Story	Daughters	Edison Ballroom, New York City, United States
10th	November 9, 2025	The Perfect Neighbor	Geeta Gandbhir – The Perfect Neighbor	My Mom Jayne: A Film by Mariska Hargitay	Edison Ballroom, New York City, United States
11th	November 8, 2026	You Can See Everything	Nathan Fielder and Lance Oppenheim – You Can See Everything	Once Upon a Time in Harlem	Edison Ballroom, New York City, United States

== See also ==
- Academy Award for Best Documentary Feature Film
- BAFTA Award for Best Documentary
- Cinema Eye Honors
- IDA Documentary Awards
- Gotham Independent Film Award for Best Documentary
- Independent Spirit Award for Best Documentary Feature
- National Board of Review Award for Best Documentary Film
- Producers Guild of America Award for Best Documentary Motion Picture
- Directors Guild of America Award for Outstanding Directorial Achievement in Documentary
