= Sarah Jessica Parker on screen and stage =

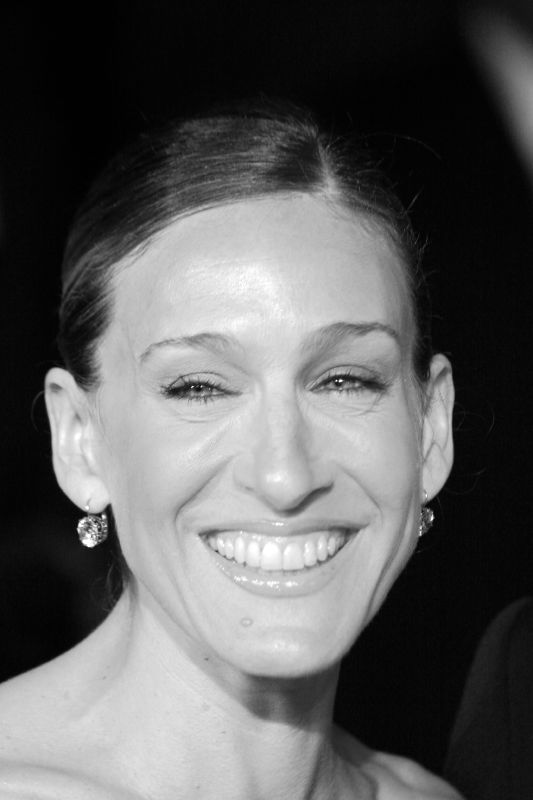
Parker in September 2007

Sarah Jessica Parker is an American actress and television producer who has been acting in film, television and theater since the 1970s. She is known for her role as Carrie Bradshaw on the HBO television series Sex and the City (1998–2004), for which she won two Emmy Awards, four Golden Globe Awards for Best Actress in a Comedy Series and three Screen Actors Guild Awards. The character was widely popular during the airing of the series and was later recognized as one of the greatest female characters in American television. She later reprised the role in films Sex and the City (2008) and Sex and the City 2 (2010), as well as the television series And Just Like That... (2021–2025).

She made her first major film appearances in the dramas Footloose and Firstborn (both 1984). Her other film roles include Girls Just Want to Have Fun (1985), The Ryan White Story (1989), L.A. Story with Steve Martin (1991), Honeymoon in Vegas with Nicolas Cage (1992), Hocus Pocus with Bette Midler (1993), Ed Wood with Johnny Depp (1994), The First Wives Club again with Midler (1996), The Family Stone with Diane Keaton (2005), Failure to Launch with Matthew McConaughey (2006), Did You Hear About the Morgans? with Hugh Grant (2009), and New Year's Eve with Abigail Breslin (2011).

In 2012, Parker returned to television for the first time since Sex and the City, portraying Isabelle Wright in three episodes of the musical television series Glee. She starred as Frances Dufresne in the HBO series Divorce alongside Thomas Haden Church (2016–2019), for which she was nominated for a Golden Globe Award. Since 2005, she has run her own production company, Pretty Matches, which has been creating content for HBO and other channels.

Parker made her Broadway debut at the age of 11 in the 1976 revival of The Innocents, before going on to star in the title role of the Broadway musical Annie in 1979.

== As an actress ==
=== Film ===
| Year | Title | Role | Notes |
|---|---|---|---|
| 1983 | Somewhere Tomorrow | Lori Anderson | |
| 1984 | Footloose | Rusty | |
| 1984 | Firstborn | Lisa | |
| 1985 | Girls Just Want to Have Fun | Janey Glenn | |
| 1986 | Flight of the Navigator | Carolyn McAdams | |
| 1991 | L.A. Story | SanDeE* | |
| 1992 | Honeymoon in Vegas | Betsy Nolan / Donna Korman | |
| 1993 | Striking Distance | Jo Christman / Det. Emily Harper | |
| 1993 | Hocus Pocus | Sarah Sanderson | |
| 1994 | Ed Wood | Dolores Fuller | |
| 1995 | Miami Rhapsody | Gwyn Marcus | |
| 1996 | Mars Attacks! | Nathalie Lake | |
| 1996 | If Lucy Fell | Lucy Ackerman | |
| 1996 | The First Wives Club | Shelly Stewart | |
| 1996 | Extreme Measures | Jodie Trammel | |
| 1996 | The Substance of Fire | Sarah Geldhart | |
| 1997 | 'Til There Was You | Francesca Lanfield | |
| 1999 | Dudley Do-Right | Nell Fenwick | |
| 2000 | State and Main | Claire Wellesley | |
| 2002 | Life Without Dick | Colleen Gibson | |
| 2005 | The Family Stone | Meredith Morton | |
| 2006 | Strangers with Candy | Peggy Callas | |
| 2006 | Failure to Launch | Paula | |
| 2007 | Spinning into Butter | Sarah Daniels | Also producer |
| 2008 | Smart People | Janet Hartigan | |
| 2008 | Sex and the City | Carrie Bradshaw | Also producer |
| 2009 | Did You Hear About the Morgans? | Meryl Morgan | |
| 2010 | Sex and the City 2 | Carrie Bradshaw | Also producer |
| 2011 | I Don't Know How She Does It | Kate Reddy | |
| 2011 | New Year's Eve | Kate Doyle | |
| 2013 | Escape from Planet Earth | Kira Supernova (voice) | |
| 2013 | Lovelace | Gloria Steinem | Scenes deleted |
| 2016 | All Roads Lead to Rome | Maggie | |
| 2018 | Here and Now | Vivienne | Also producer |
| 2018 | What She Said: The Art of Pauline Kael | Pauline Kael (voice) | Documentary |
| 2022 | Hocus Pocus 2 | Sarah Sanderson | |
| 2027 | The Families Stone | Meredith Morton | Filming; Also producer |

=== Television ===
| Year | Title | Role | Notes |
|---|---|---|---|
| 1974 | The Little Match Girl | The Little Match Girl | Television film |
| 1980 | 3-2-1 Contact | Annie | 3 episodes |
| 1982 | My Body, My Child | Katy | Television film |
| 1982–1983 | Square Pegs | Patty Greene | Lead role, 20 episodes |
| 1984 | ABC Afterschool Special | Suzanne Henderson | Episode: "The Almost Royal Family" |
| 1986 | Hotel | Rachel | Episode: "Hearts Divided" |
| 1987 | The Room Upstairs | Mandy Janovic | Television film |
| 1987–1988 | A Year in the Life | Kay Erickson | Main cast, 22 episodes |
| 1988 | Dadah Is Death | Rachel Goldman | 2-part miniseries |
| 1989 | Twist of Fate | Miriam | Episode: "Part II" |
| 1989 | The Ryan White Story | Laura | Television film |
| 1989 | Life Under Water | Amy-Beth | Television film |
| 1991 | Shalom Sesame | Jerusalem Jones | Episode: "Show 10: Passover" |
| 1990–1991 | Equal Justice | Jo Ann Harris | Main cast, 26 episodes |
| 1992 | In the Best Interest of the Children | Callie Cain | Television film |
| 1994 | Saturday Night Live | Host | Episode: "Sarah Jessica Parker/R.E.M." |
| 1994 | The Larry Sanders Show | Herself | Episode: "Next Stop . . . Bottom" |
| 1996 | The Sunshine Boys | Nancy Davison | Television film |
| 1998 | Stories from My Childhood | Narrator (voice) | Episode: "Cinderella & The House on Chicken Legs" |
| 1999 | Space Ghost Coast to Coast | Herself | Episode: "Curling Flower Space" |
| 1998–2004 | Sex and the City | Carrie Bradshaw | 94 episodes, also executive producer and narrator |
| 2007 | Project Runway | Herself | Episode: "I Started Crying" |
| 2007–2010 | Sesame Street | Herself | 3 episodes |
| 2010 | Who Do You Think You Are? | Herself | Episode: "Sarah Jessica Parker" |
| 2012–2013 | Glee | Isabelle Wright | 3 episodes |
| 2016–2019 | Divorce | Frances Dufresne | Lead role, 24 episodes, also executive producer |
| 2016 | Nightcap | Herself | Episode: "Babymaker" |
| 2021–2025 | And Just Like That... | Carrie Bradshaw | Lead role, 33 episodes, also executive producer |
| 2025 | The Adam Friedland Show | Herself | 1 episode |

=== Theatre ===
| Year | Title | Role | Venue |
|---|---|---|---|
| 1976 | The Innocents | Flora | Morosco Theatre (12 performances) |
| 1978–1980 | Annie | July / Annie (replacement) | Uris Theatre |
| 1984 | To Gillian on Her 37th Birthday | Rachel | Circle in the Square Downtown |
| 1988 | The Heidi Chronicles | Becky / Clara / Denise (replacement) | Playwrights Horizons |
| 1989–1990 | The Heidi Chronicles | Becky / Clara / Denise (replacement) | Plymouth Theatre |
| 1991 | The Substance of Fire | Sarah Geldhart | Playwrights Horizons |
| 1992 | The Substance of Fire | Sarah Geldhart | Mitzi E. Newhouse Theater |
| 1995 | Sylvia | Sylvia | New York City Center / Stage I |
| 1995–1996 | How to Succeed in Business Without Really Trying | Rosemary Pillkington (replacement) | Richard Rodgers Theatre |
| 1996–1997 | Once Upon a Mattress | Princess Winnifred | Broadhurst Theatre |
| 2001 | Wonder of the World | Cass Harris | New York City Center / Stage I |
| 2013–2014 | The Commons of Pensacola | Becca | New York City Center / Stage I |
| 2020 | Plaza Suite | Karen Nash / Muriel Tate / Norma Hubley | Colonial Theatre |
| 2022 | Plaza Suite | Karen Nash / Muriel Tate / Norma Hubley | Hudson Theatre, Broadway |
| 2024 | Plaza Suite | Karen Nash / Muriel Tate / Norma Hubley | Savoy Theatre, West End |

== As a producer ==
| Year | Title | Notes |
|---|---|---|
| 2002–2004 | Sex and the City | 28 episodes (executive producer); 18 episodes (co-executive producer); 16 episodes (producer) |
| 2007 | Spinning into Butter | |
| 2008 | Sex and the City | Co-producer |
| 2009 | Washingtonienne | Executive producer; episode: "Pilot" |
| 2010 | Sex and the City 2 | |
| 2010 | Work of Art: The Next Great Artist | Executive producer |
| 2012 | Pretty Old | Executive producer; documentary |
| 2013–2014 | City.Ballet | Executive producer; TV series short |
| 2016–2019 | Divorce | Executive producer |
| 2018 | Here and Now | Executive producer |
| 2021–2025 | And Just Like That... | Executive producer |
| 2025 | The Librarians | Executive producer; documentary |
| 2026 | Bang My Box: The Robin Byrd Story | Producer; documentary |

== See also ==
- List of awards and nominations received by Sarah Jessica Parker
