= List of awards and nominations received by Sarah Jessica Parker =

Sarah Jessica Parker awards and nominations
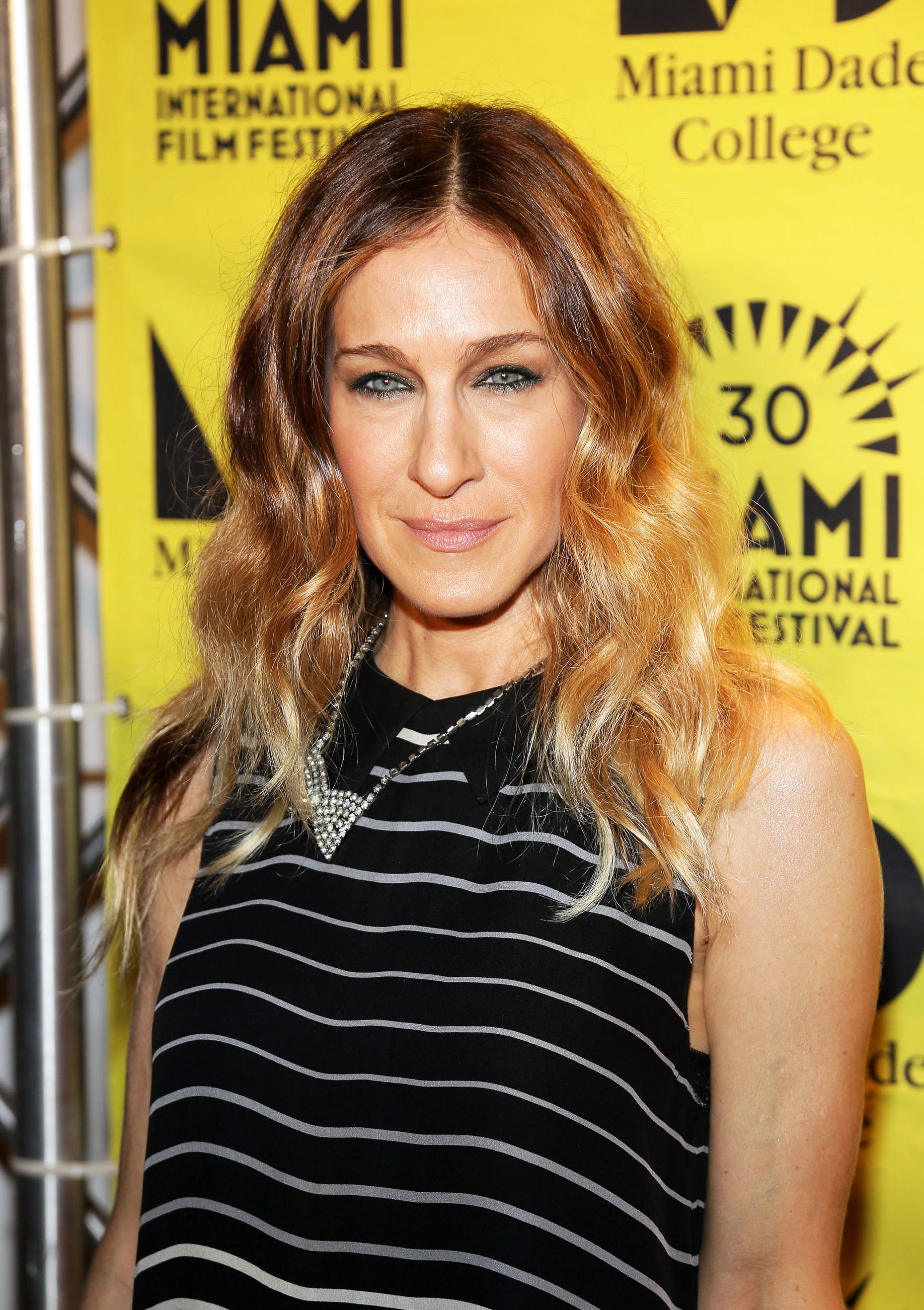
- Parker in 2013
Awards and nominations
Award	Wins	Nominations
Golden Globe Awards	6	14
Laurence Olivier Awards	0	1
Primetime Emmy Awards	2	10
Producers Guild of America Awards	2	4
Screen Actors Guild Awards	3	9

The following is a list of awards and nominations received by American actress and producer Sarah Jessica Parker.

She is most known for her role as Carrie Bradshaw on the HBO comedy series Sex and the City (1998–2004). For her performance she earned two Primetime Emmy Awards (out of fourteen nominations), as well six Golden Globe Awards and three Screen Actors Guild Awards

== Major associations ==
=== Emmy Awards ===
Year	Category	Nominated work	Result	Ref.
Primetime Emmy Awards
1999	Outstanding Lead Actress in a Comedy Series	Sex and the City	Nominated	
2000	Outstanding Lead Actress in a Comedy Series	Sex and the City	Nominated	
2001	Outstanding Lead Actress in a Comedy Series	Sex and the City	Nominated	
2001	Outstanding Comedy Series	Sex and the City	Won	
2002	Outstanding Lead Actress in a Comedy Series	Sex and the City	Nominated	
2002	Outstanding Comedy Series	Sex and the City	Nominated	
2003	Outstanding Lead Actress in a Comedy Series	Sex and the City	Nominated	
2003	Outstanding Comedy Series	Sex and the City	Nominated	
2004	Outstanding Lead Actress in a Comedy Series	Sex and the City	Won	
2004	Outstanding Comedy Series	Sex and the City	Nominated	

=== Golden Globe Awards ===
Year	Category	Nominated work	Result	Ref.
1999	Best Actress in a Television Series — Comedy or Musical	Sex and the City	Nominated	
2000	Best Actress in a Television Series — Comedy or Musical	Sex and the City	Won	
2001	Best Actress in a Television Series — Comedy or Musical	Sex and the City	Won	
2001	Best Television Series – Musical or Comedy	Sex and the City	Won	
2002	Best Actress in a Television Series — Comedy or Musical	Sex and the City	Won	
2002	Best Television Series – Musical or Comedy	Sex and the City	Won	
2003	Best Actress in a Television Series — Comedy or Musical	Sex and the City	Nominated	
2003	Best Television Series – Musical or Comedy	Sex and the City	Nominated	
2004	Best Actress in a Television Series — Comedy or Musical	Sex and the City	Won	
2004	Best Television Series – Musical or Comedy	Sex and the City	Nominated	
2005	Best Actress in a Television Series — Comedy or Musical	Sex and the City	Nominated	
2005	Best Television Series – Musical or Comedy	Sex and the City	Nominated	
2006	Best Actress in a Motion Picture — Comedy or Musical	The Family Stone	Nominated	
2017	Best Actress in a Television Series — Comedy or Musical	Divorce	Nominated	
2026	Carol Burnett Award	—N/a	Honored	

=== Laurence Olivier Awards ===
Year	Category	Nominated work	Result	Ref.
2024	Best Actress	Plaza Suite	Nominated	

=== Producers Guild Awards ===
Year	Category	Nominated work	Result	Ref.
2002	Outstanding Producer of Episodic Television, Comedy	Sex and the City	Won	
2003	Outstanding Producer of Episodic Television, Comedy	Sex and the City	Nominated	
2004	Outstanding Producer of Episodic Television, Comedy	Sex and the City	Won	
2005	Outstanding Producer of Episodic Television, Comedy	Sex and the City	Nominated	

=== Screen Actors Guild Awards ===
Year	Category	Nominated work	Result	Ref.
2000	Outstanding Female Actor in a Comedy Series	Sex and the City	Nominated	
2001	Outstanding Female Actor in a Comedy Series	Sex and the City	Won	
2001	Outstanding Ensemble in a Comedy Series	Sex and the City	Nominated	
2002	Outstanding Female Actor in a Comedy Series	Sex and the City	Nominated	
2002	Outstanding Ensemble in a Comedy Series	Sex and the City	Won	
2003	Outstanding Ensemble in a Comedy Series	Sex and the City	Nominated	
2004	Outstanding Ensemble in a Comedy Series	Sex and the City	Won	
2005	Outstanding Female Actor in a Comedy Series	Sex and the City	Nominated	
2005	Outstanding Ensemble in a Comedy Series	Sex and the City	Nominated	

== Theatre Awards ==
=== Drama Desk Awards ===
Year	Category	Nominated work	Result	Ref.
1996	Outstanding Actress in a Play	Sylvia	Nominated	
2002	Outstanding Actress in a Play	Wonder of the World	Nominated	

=== Drama League Award ===
Year	Category	Nominated work	Result	Ref.
2022	Distinguished Performance	Plaza Suite	Nominated	

=== Hasty Pudding Theatricals ===
Year	Category	Nominated work	Result	Ref.
2002	Woman of the Year		Received	

== Critic Awards ==
Year	Association	Category	Nominated work	Result
2001	Florida Film Critics Circle Awards	Best Ensemble Cast	State and Main	Won
1996	National Board of Review	Best Acting by an Ensemble	The First Wives Club	Won
2000	National Board of Review	Best Acting by an Ensemble	State and Main	Won
2001	Online Film Critics Society	Best Ensemble	State and Main	Won
2005	Women Film Critics Circle Awards	Best Comedic Performance (tied with Paula Jai Parker for Hustle & Flow)	The Family Stone	Won
2011	Women Film Critics Circle Awards	Best Comedic Actress	I Don't Know How She Does It	Nominated

== Film Festival ==
Year	Association	Category	Nominated work	Result
2013	Global Nonviolent Film Festival	Best Lead Actress	I Don't Know How She Does It	Won
2002	Monte-Carlo TV Festival	Outstanding Actress — Comedy Series	Sex and the City	Won
2008	ShoWest Convention	Vanguard Award		Won
2010	ShoWest Convention	Ensemble Award	Sex and the City 2	Won

== Miscellaneous Awards ==
Association	Year	Category	Nominated work	Results
Alliance of Women film Journalists	2006	Actress Most In Need of a New Agent	Failure to Launch	Nominated
Alliance of Women film Journalists	2011	Hall of Shame	Sex and the City 2	Won
Alliance of Women film Journalists	2011	Actress Most In Need of a New Agent	Sex and the City 2	Nominated
Alliance of Women film Journalists	2012	Actress Most In Need of a New Agent	I Don't Know How She Does It	Nominated
American Comedy Awards	2000	Funniest Female Lead Performer in a TV Series	Sex and the City	Nominated
American Comedy Awards	2001	Funniest Female Lead Performer in a TV Series	Sex and the City	Nominated
American Comedy Awards	2001	Funniest Female Performer in a TV Special	2000 MTV Movie Awards	Nominated
Awards Circuit Community Awards	1994	Best Cast Ensemble	Ed Wood	Nominated
Bambi Awards	2011	Surprise	Sex and the City 2	Won
Gold Derby Awards	2004	Comedy Lead Actress	Sex and the City	Won
Gracie Allen Awards	2004	Individual Achievement for Best Female Lead — Comedy	Sex and the City	Won
Kids' Choice Awards	2007	Favorite Female Movie Star	Failure to Launch	Nominated
Kids' Choice Awards	2023	Favorite Movie Actress	Hocus Pocus 2	Nominated
National Movie Awards	2008	Best Performance — Female	Sex and the City	Nominated
Online Film & Television Association	2000	Best Actress in a Comedy Series	Sex and the City	Won
Online Film & Television Association	2000	Best Ensemble in a Comedy Series	Sex and the City	Nominated
Online Film & Television Association	2001	Best Actress in a Comedy Series	Sex and the City	Nominated
Online Film & Television Association	2002	Best Ensemble in a Comedy Series	Sex and the City	Nominated
Online Film & Television Association	2003	Best Actress in a Comedy Series	Sex and the City	Nominated
Online Film & Television Association	2004	Best Actress in a Comedy Series	Sex and the City	Nominated
Online Film & Television Association	2004	Best Ensemble in a Comedy Series	Sex and the City	Nominated
People's Choice Awards	1999	Favorite Female Television Performer	Sex and the City	Nominated
People's Choice Awards	2009	Favorite Cast	Sex and the City	Nominated
People's Choice Awards	2017	Favorite Premium Series Actress	Divorce	Won
Razzie Awards	2010	Worst Actress	Did You Hear About the Morgans?	Nominated
Razzie Awards	2011	Worst Actress (shared with Kim Cattrall, Kristin Davis & Cynthia Nixon)	Sex and the City 2	Won
Razzie Awards	2012	Worst Actress	I Don't Know How She Does It; New Year's Eve	Nominated
Satellite Awards	1997	Best Supporting Actress in a Motion Picture — Comedy or Musical	The First Wives Club	Nominated
Saturn Awards	1994	Best Supporting Actress	Hocus Pocus	Nominated
Teen Choice Awards	2006	Choice Movie Actress: Comedy	Failure to Launch	Nominated
Teen Choice Awards	2008	Choice Movie Actress: Comedy	Sex and the City	Nominated
The Stinkers Bad Movie Awards	1997	Worst Supporting Actress	'Til There Was You	Nominated
Women in Film Crystal + Lucy Awards	1999	Lucy Award (shared with Kim Cattrall, Kristin Davis & Cynthia Nixon)	Sex and the City	Won
Young Artist Awards	1984	Best Young Actress in a Comedy Series	Square Pegs	Nominated
Young Artist Awards	1985	Best Young Supporting Actress in a Motion Picture	Footloose	Nominated
