= Robin Byrd =

American pornographic actress & talk show host

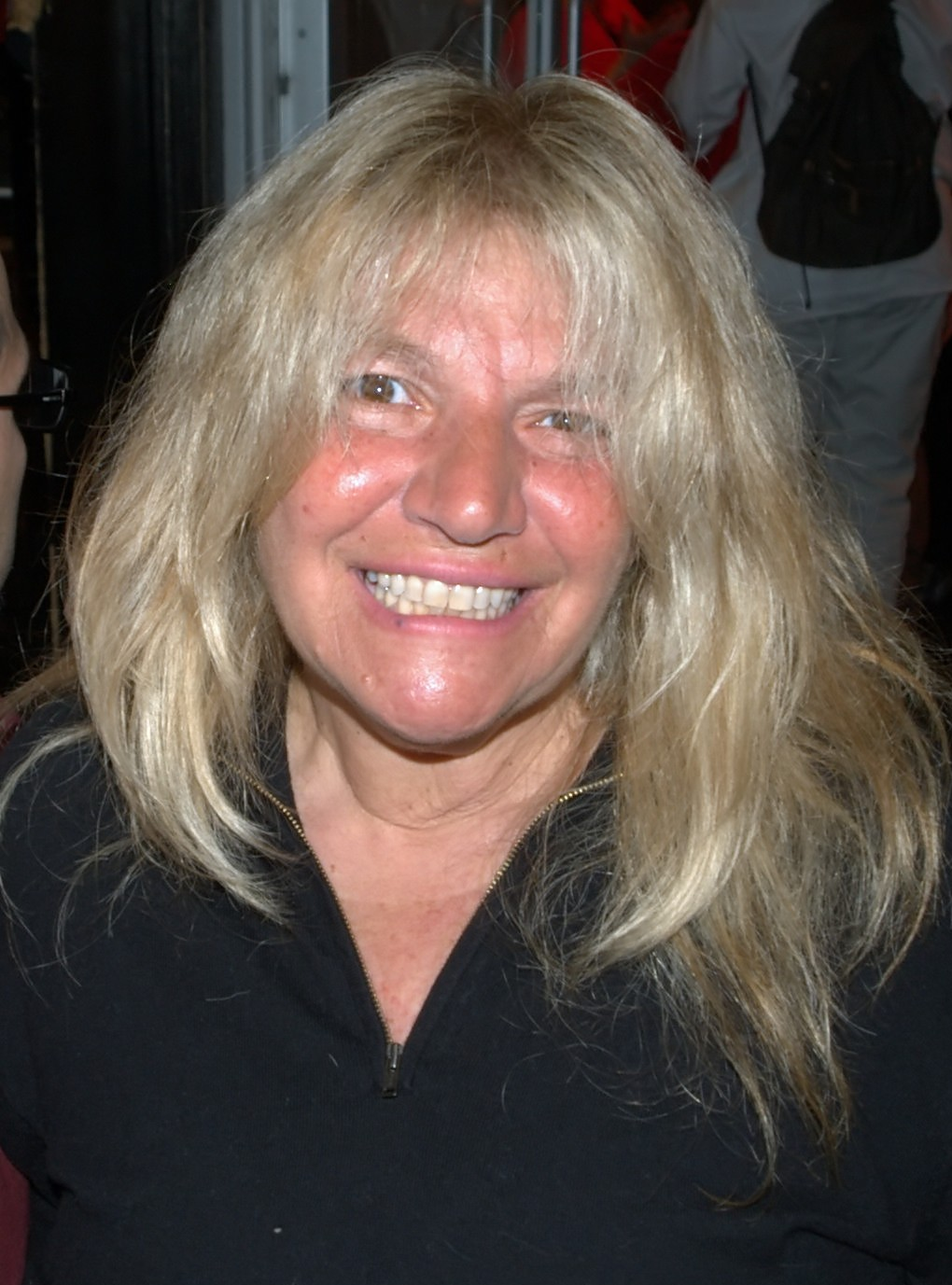
- Byrd in 2010
- Born: April 6, 1957 (age 69); New York City, New York, U.S.
- Occupations: Actress; television host
- Spouse: Shelly Byrd (m. 1983)
- Website: robinbyrd.com

Robin Byrd (born April 6, 1957) is an American actress and television host. She hosted The Robin Byrd Show on leased access cable television in New York City from 1977 to 1998. She appeared in several pornographic films in the 1970s, including the 1978 film Debbie Does Dallas.

== Early life ==
Born in New York City, Byrd was adopted at birth and raised on the Upper East Side of Manhattan. Her adoptive father, an antiques dealer, died when she was eight years old. Byrd says she has been unable to identify her birth parents, due to sealed birth and adoption records under New York state law. After obtaining her graduate equivalency diploma at age 17, she studied marketing and advertising at Baruch College, but dropped out in her senior year. She also attended the School of Visual Arts and worked as a nude model for art classes. For a time she lived with her girlfriend's family and also engaged in sex work to make money.

== Career ==
Byrd performed in pornographic films during the 1970s, including the 1978 film Debbie Does Dallas.

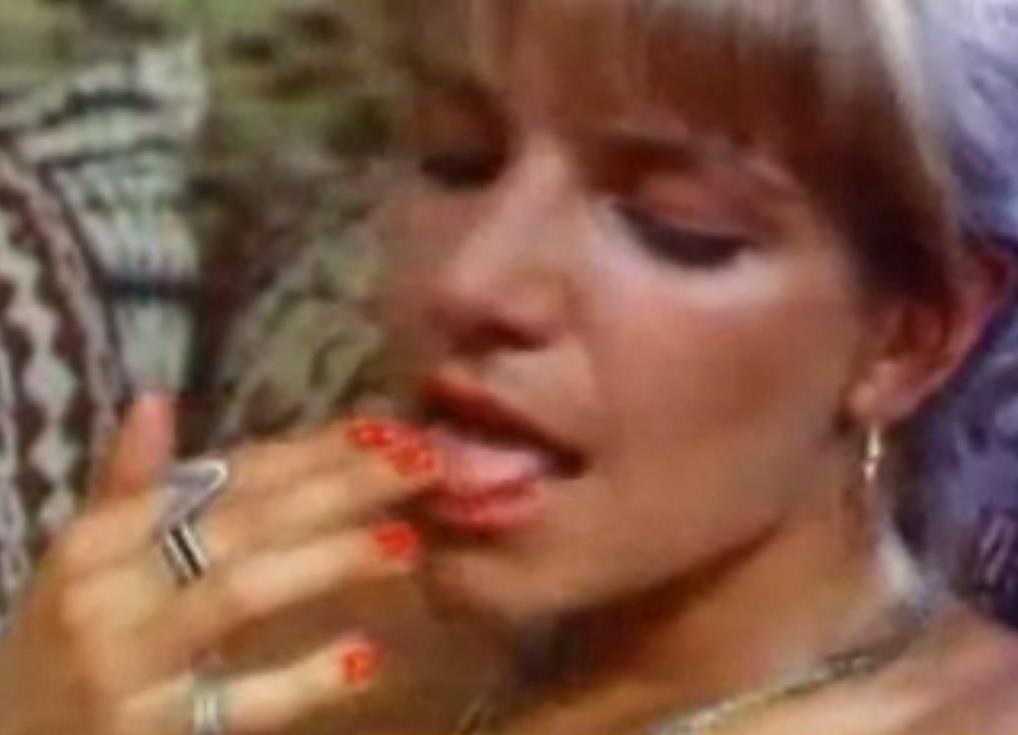
Byrd in the film Debbie Does Dallas (1978)

After guest-hosting on a leased access show called Hot Legs, Byrd changed the name to The Robin Byrd Show in 1977. The show was initially broadcast on Manhattan Cable TV's Channel J and later aired on New York's Channel 35. The final show was aired in 1998; it later appeared in reruns interspersed with occasional newer segments. Byrd was the first woman to host a television program related to the sex industry, appearing on screen in a black crochet bikini and white fingernail polish. The show featured performances by male and female strippers while also taking live calls from viewers. Each show customarily ended with the guests dancing to Robin's recording of a bawdy novelty tune, "Baby, Let Me Bang Your Box".

Byrd also hosted the 2004 documentary Access Nation.

=== Time Warner Cable lawsuit ===
Along with Al Goldstein, producer of sexually themed talk show Midnight Blue, Byrd joined the American Civil Liberties Union (ACLU) in a lawsuit against Time Warner Cable (and its predecessor, Manhattan Cable TV), which wanted to scramble all adult-oriented content so that subscribers had to send in written requests to view it. In 1978, the Eighth Circuit Court of Appeals struck down as unconstitutional the Federal Communications Commission (FCC) mandatory access regulations under which Byrd had challenged the cable provider's actions; the U.S. Supreme Court disposed of the case on other grounds.

In 1995, the issue was again before the United States Court of Appeals for the District of Columbia Circuit, which upheld the regulations and ruled that TWC's requirement for written requests was a violation. As of 2007, The Robin Byrd Show continued to be aired unscrambled and uncut, with disclaimers that its contents were not suitable for children.

== In popular culture ==
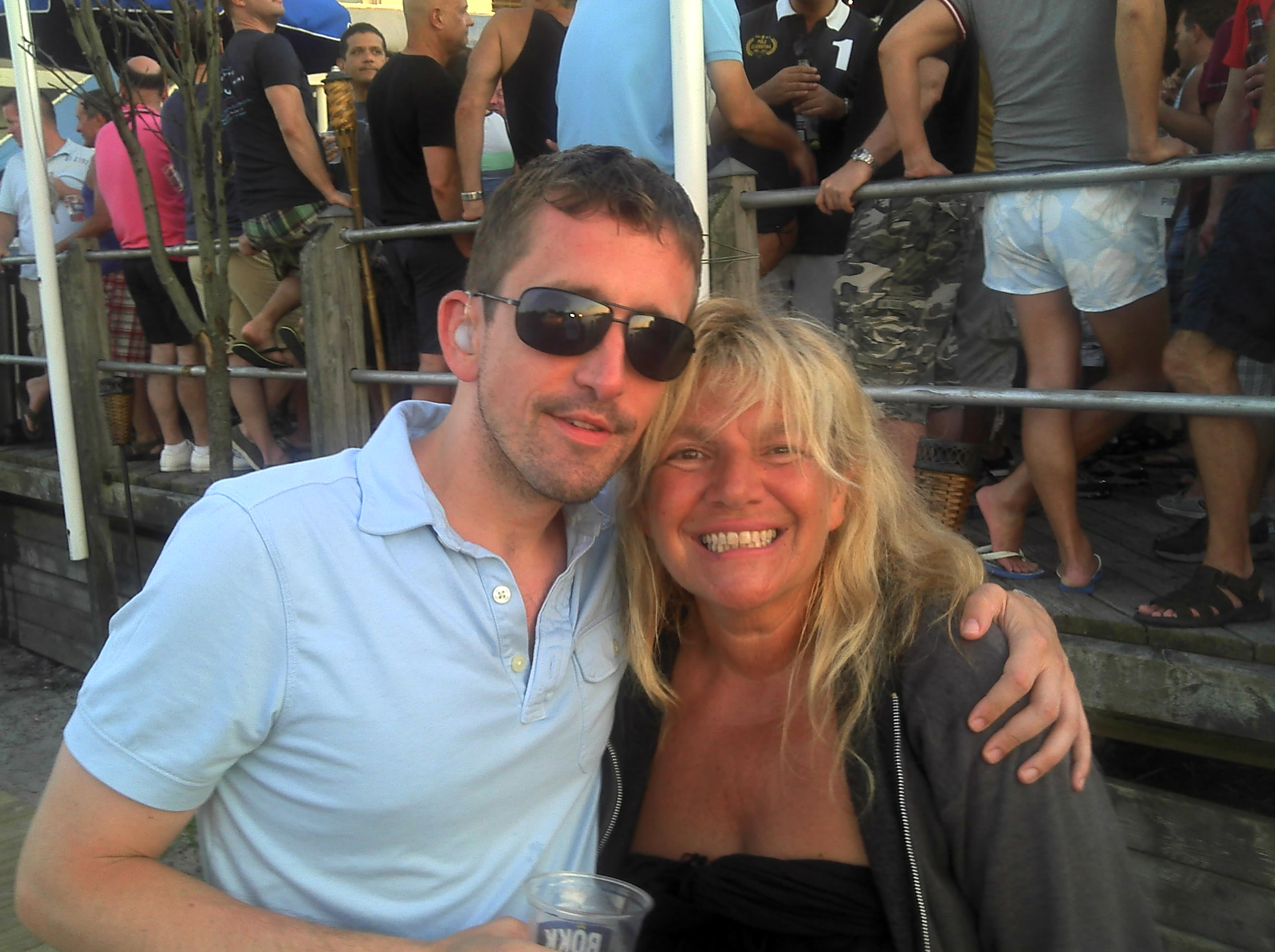
Byrd on Fire Island in 2011

Byrd's show and filmography have made her a local celebrity and to some extent, a national one. She is a frequent presenter at New York City adult entertainment, gay pride, and AIDS awareness events. The Robin Byrd Show was parodied on Saturday Night Live in a series of skits airing in 1997 and 1998; Byrd was played by Cheri Oteri.

In 1999, Richard Avedon photographed Byrd for a feature in The New Yorker on famous and influential New Yorkers. Byrd has also branched out into other adult-oriented businesses, including phone sex lines and ringtones.

In 2015, Robin released "Touch Me", a dance single with recording artist Lovari.

The 2026 documentary Bang My Box: The Robin Byrd Story examines Byrd's life and career. Released on HBO, the film was directed by Jyllian Gunther and Stephanie Schwam and produced by Sarah Jessica Parker. The title refers to the Robin Byrd Show's theme song, "Bang My Box".

== Personal life ==
Byrd met her future husband Shelly Byrd in 1974; they married in 1983. Shelly also acted as co-producer on the Robin Byrd Show. Byrd has a home on Fire Island and an apartment in Manhattan. She is bisexual. For many years, Byrd and her husband were part of a throuple with another woman.
