= Pullout =

Pullout, pull-out, or Pull Out may refer to:

- Coitus interruptus, or the "pull-out" method, a method of birth control
- Sofa bed, or pullout sofa, which contains a frame and mattress that can unfold to make a bed
- Gifted pull-out, an educational approach in which students are removed from a classroom to spend time with academic peers
- Pull Out, a 2004 documentary directed by Jyllian Gunther
- A lay-by or turnout on the side of the road (like a rest area)

== Plant related ==
- Festuca octoflora, pullout grass
- Pull out vines, vine control schemes in Europe

== See also ==
- "Pull Out the Pin", a song by Kate Bush from the 1982 album The Dreaming
  - The title of a documentary on the Vietnam War for which the song got its name
