= Sarah Jessica Parker =

American actress (born 1965)

- Parker in 2026
- Born: March 25, 1965 (age 61); Nelsonville, Ohio, U.S.
- Occupations: Actress; producer
- Years active: 1974–present
- Works: Full list
- Spouse: Matthew Broderick (m. 1997)
- Partner: Robert Downey Jr. (1984–1991)
- Children: 3
- Relatives: Timothy Britten Parker (brother); Pippin Parker (brother)
- Awards: Full list

Sarah Jessica Parker (born March 25, 1965) is an American actress and television producer. In a career spanning over five decades, she has performed across several productions of both screen and stage. Her accolades include six Golden Globe Awards and two Primetime Emmy Awards. Time magazine named her one of the 100 most influential people in the world in 2022.

Parker made her Broadway debut at the age of 11 in the 1976 revival of The Innocents, going on to star in the title role of the Broadway musical Annie in 1979. She made her first major film appearances in the 1984 dramas Footloose and Firstborn. Further films followed in the 1990s, including L.A. Story (1991), Honeymoon in Vegas (1992), Hocus Pocus (1993), Ed Wood (1994), and Mars Attacks! (1996).

Parker gained global stardom with her portrayal of Carrie Bradshaw in the HBO comedy drama series Sex and the City (1998–2004), for which she won two Primetime Emmy Awards, four Golden Globe Awards for Best Actress in a Comedy Series, and three Screen Actors Guild Awards. She later reprised the role in the films Sex and the City (2008) and Sex and the City 2 (2010), as well as the revival series And Just Like That... (2021–2025). The character was widely successful and has been included in various lists of the greatest female American TV characters.

Concurrently, Parker continued to appear in films, such as The Family Stone (2005), Failure to Launch (2006), Did You Hear About the Morgans? (2009), New Year's Eve (2011), and Hocus Pocus 2 (2022). Further television roles included her portrayal of Isabelle Wright in three episodes of the Fox musical series Glee (2012) and Frances Dufresne in the HBO comedy drama series Divorce (2016–2019), for which she was nominated for a Golden Globe Award. Since 2005, she has run her own production company, Pretty Matches, which has created content for HBO and other networks.

Parker has been labeled a fashion icon, with her style, fashion ventures, (Note: Parker's fashion ventures include the SJP Collection, a footwear line through Nordstrom, and multiple brand partnerships and endorsements.) and character styles (Note: Parker's Sex and the City character Carrie Bradshaw is known for her fashion style and numerous publications have attributed this to Parker's success as a fashion icon.) garnering widespread media attention. Her multiple Met Gala appearances have also been widely publicized. (Note: Parker has attended the Met Gala on multiple occasions, with her outfits frequently garnering recognition.)

== Early life ==
Sarah Jessica Parker was born on March 25, 1965, in Nelsonville, Ohio, the daughter of Barbara Parker (née Keck), a nursery-school operator and teacher, and Stephen Parker, an entrepreneur and journalist. She was one of a total of eight children from her parents' marriage and her mother's second marriage; her full siblings include actors Timothy Britten Parker and Pippin Parker. Parker's parents divorced when she was 3½ years old, and her mother married Paul Forste, a truck driver and account executive. Stephen, a native of Brooklyn, is Jewish (from a family from Eastern Europe) and his family's original surname was "Bar-Kahn" ("son of Kohen"). Barbara is of German, and some English, descent.

Parker has identified as culturally Jewish, like her father, although she has had no religious training. Her parents struggled to support their large family – often the electricity could be shut off, or the family would have to forgo Christmases and birthdays for lack of money. She has stated: "I wouldn't change any of it, for anything ... for the most part, we had everything we needed. Not always, but for the most part." Her mother immersed her children in culture and extracurricular activities. She often took them to free public institutions like the ballet and the theater in Cincinnati, so that they lived "full, rich lives", emulating the New York artistic scene.

As a young girl, Parker trained in singing and ballet, and was soon cast in the Broadway revival of William Archibald's play The Innocents. Her family moved to Cincinnati and then to Dobbs Ferry, New York, near New York City, so that she could get specialized training. There, her mother and stepfather helped her develop her acting career. In 1977, the family moved to the newly opened planned community on Roosevelt Island, in the East River between Manhattan and Queens, then to Manhattan. They later moved to Englewood, New Jersey, where she attended Dwight Morrow High School.

Parker attended the School of American Ballet in New York City, the New York Professional Children's School, the School for Creative and Performing Arts in Cincinnati, and Hollywood High School in Los Angeles.

== Career ==
=== 1974–1997: Early acting career ===
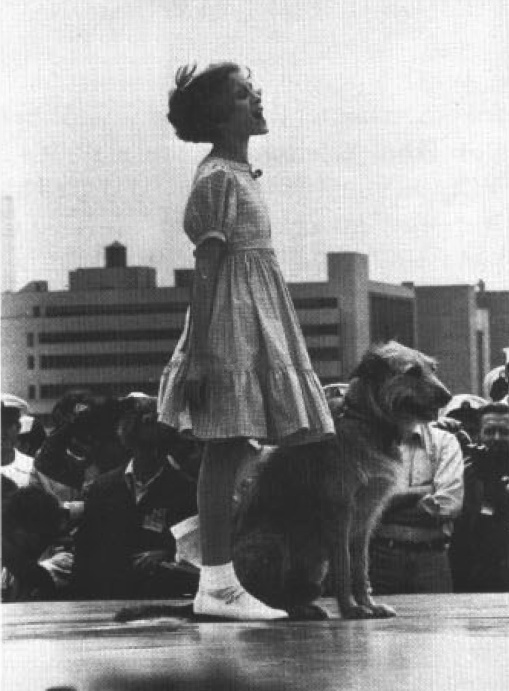
Parker during a USO show aboard USS Iwo Jima, 1979

Parker and four siblings appeared in a production of The Sound of Music at the outdoor Municipal Theatre (Muny) in St. Louis, Missouri. She was selected for a role in the new 1977–81 Broadway musical Annie: first in the small role of "July" and then succeeding Andrea McArdle and Shelley Bruce in the lead role of the Depression-era orphan, beginning March 1979. Parker held the role for a year. In 1982, Parker obtained the lead role of the CBS sitcom Square Pegs, which lasted just one season. Her performance as a shy teen who showed hidden depths, nevertheless, was acclaimed by critics. In the three years that followed, Parker was cast in four films: the most significant being Footloose (1984) and Girls Just Want to Have Fun (1985), with Helen Hunt. In 1986, Parker appeared in Flight of the Navigator, a Disney science fiction film.

In the romantic comedy L.A. Story (1991), Parker took on the role of a ditzy aspiring spokesmodel meeting a television meteorologist; both the film and her performance garnered positive reviews. She would star with Nicolas Cage, as the girlfriend of a commitment-phobic man, in the film Honeymoon in Vegas (1992), and play one in a villainous trio of witches in the Disney fantasy family comedy Hocus Pocus (1993), alongside Bette Midler and Kathy Najimy. Honeymoon in Vegas was a critical success, earning US$35m while Hocus Pocus rated average with reviewers and made US$39 million in the US, but became a cult film due to strong DVD sales and large television following. In 1993, she also starred as a police diver opposite Bruce Willis in the film Striking Distance, and in 1994, she appeared opposite Johnny Depp in the critically acclaimed biographical drama Ed Wood as the titular character's girlfriend, Dolores Fuller. She headlined the romantic comedy Miami Rhapsody (1995), playing a woman who has some misgivings about her fiancé, and starred in the off-Broadway play Sylvia, alongside future husband Matthew Broderick.

In 1996, she appeared in another Tim Burton-directed movie, Mars Attacks!, in which she made part of a large ensemble cast consisting of Jack Nicholson, Glenn Close, Pierce Brosnan, among others, portraying a chat-show host whose head is transposed with that of her chihuahua by the invading aliens. The romantic comedy The First Wives Club saw Parker take on the role of a dim-witted but manipulative fiancée, and also reunite with Hocus Pocus collaborator Bette Midler. The film was a critical darling and a major commercial success, grossing US$105 million at the North American box office, and it developed a cult following among middle-aged women. Her other 1996 release was The Substance of Fire, in which she reprised her 1991 stage role. In 1997, Parker appeared as a washed-up former child actress in the little seen comedy 'Til There Was You.

=== 1998–2004: Sex and the City ===
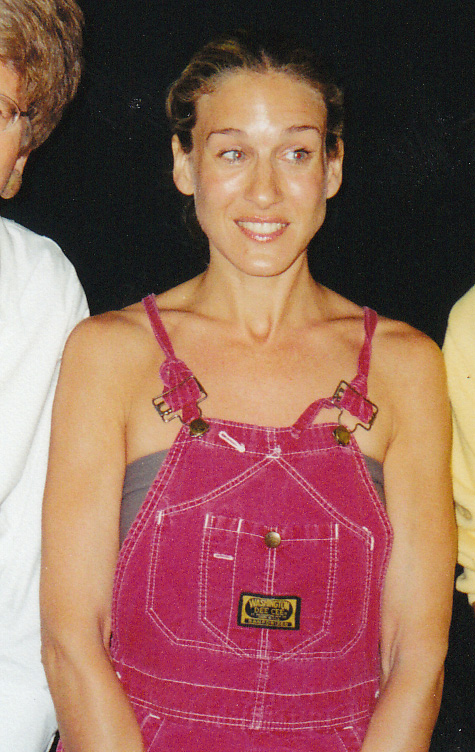
Parker at the rehearsal for the 1999 Emmy Awards

The script for the HBO dramedy series Sex and the City was sent to Parker. Set in New York City and based on Candace Bushnell's 1997 book of the same name, the show follows the lives of a group of four women—three in their mid-thirties and one in her forties—who, despite their different natures and ever-changing sex lives, remain inseparable and confide in each other. Creator Darren Star wanted her for the project, and despite some doubts about being cast in a long-term television series, she agreed to star. Her role was that of Carrie Bradshaw, the narrator and main protagonist, with each episode structured around her train of thought while writing her weekly column "Sex and the City" for the fictitious paper, the New York Star. The positive response to her performance during the show's run continued in the years immediately afterward. Bradshaw was widely popular during the run and later included in lists of the greatest female characters in American television history. In 2009, The Guardian named Bradshaw an icon of the decade: "Carrie Bradshaw did as much to shift the culture around certain women's issues as real-life female groundbreakers." She received two Emmy Awards, three Screen Actors Guild Awards, and four Golden Globe Awards for her performance.

=== 2004–2015: Continued film roles ===
In late 2005, Parker reunited with First Wives Club co-star Diane Keaton for her first film in years, the seasonal family dramedy The Family Stone, in which she played an uptight, contemporary New York City career woman. James Berardinelli, in his review, wrote: "The talented cast helps. Sarah Jessica Parker, finding that there is life after Sex in the City, has no difficulty with [her role]'s arc. Of all the characters in the movie, she undergoes the biggest transformation, and Parker aces it". Budgeted at US$18 million, it was a commercial success, grossing over US$92 million worldwide. For her role, she received a Golden Globe nomination for Best Actress – Comedy. Her next film was the romantic comedy Failure to Launch, starring with Matthew McConaughey as an interventionist hired to get a 35-year-old man out of the home of his parents. It was released on March 10, 2006, and opened atop in the North American box office, grossing over US$24 million on its opening weekend, despite negative reviews. Her work as a producer continued with her next starring vehicle, the independent drama Spinning into Butter (2007), based on the Rebecca Gilman play. The film Smart People (2008) premiered at the Sundance Film Festival and saw Parker portray a sympathetic doctor, opposite Dennis Quaid and Elliot Page.

Following the end of Sex and the City, rumors of a film version circulated, until preparations for a production were resumed in 2007, and the film was released on May 30, 2008. A sequel Sex and the City 2, was released in 2010. Despite lukewarm critical responses, both films were commercially successful. In the interim, Parker teamed up with Hugh Grant for the romantic comedy Did You Hear About the Morgans? (2009), playing a recently separated New York power couple on the verge of divorce until they witness the murder of a man. While the film was a moderate commercial success, Parker received a Razzie Award nomination for Worst Actress, and Roger Ebert, panning the film, noted: "I grant you Hugh Grant and Sarah Jessica Parker evoke charm in the right screenplay. This is the wrong screenplay". In 2011, Parker starred in I Don't Know How She Does It, described by critics as "[a] limp comedy with a hopelessly outdated viewpoint on gender, featuring Sarah Jessica Parker in rote Carrie-mode", and also made part of a large ensemble cast in Garry Marshall's romantic comedy New Year's Eve (2011), which made US$142 million worldwide. For Sex and the City 2 and her 2011 roles, she garnered nominations for the Razzie Award for Worst Actress.

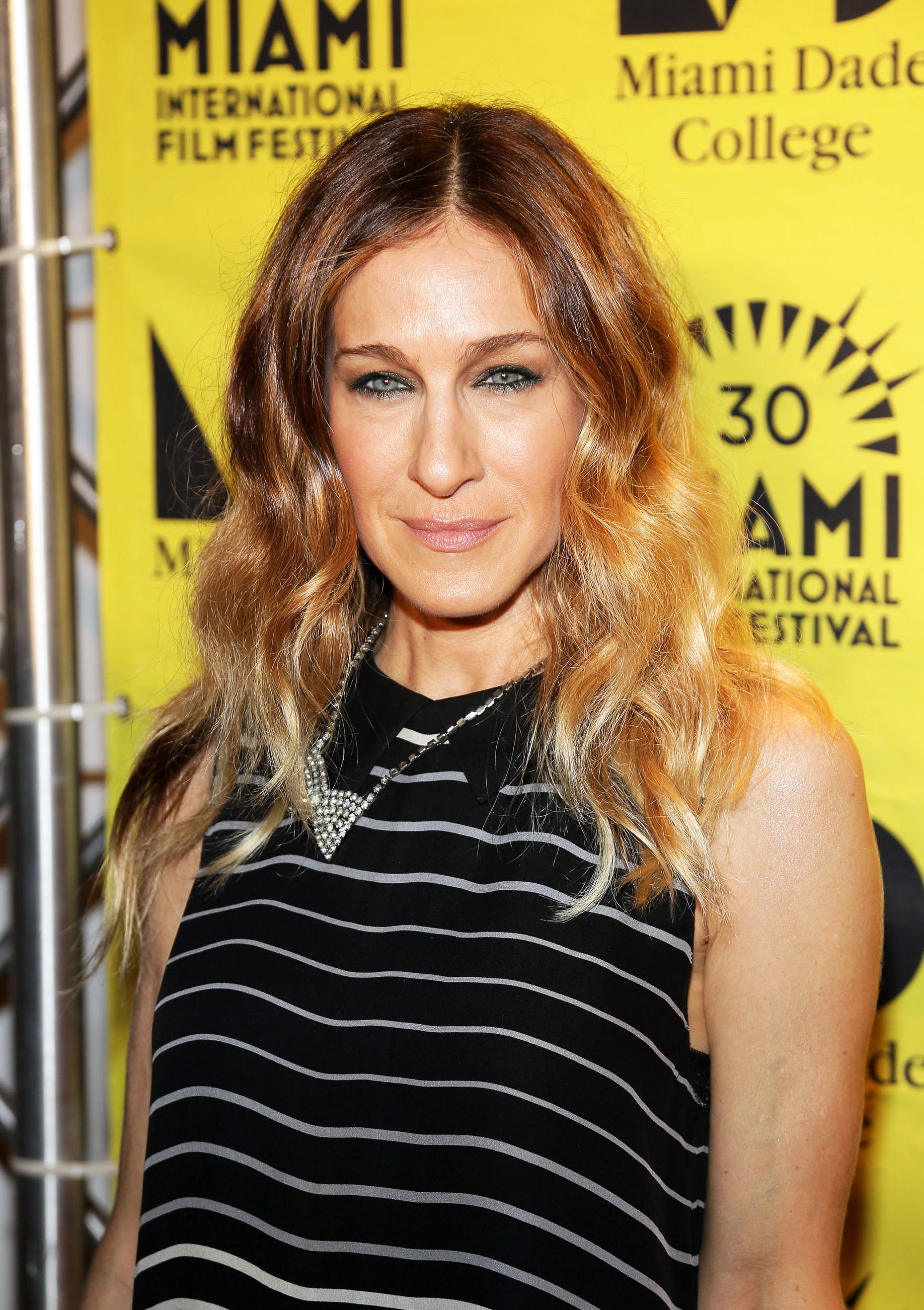
Parker at the Miami International Film Festival in 2013

Parker guest-starred on season 4 of FOX musical comedy series Glee as Isabelle Wright, a Vogue executive who takes Kurt Hummel under her wing after he graduates and moves to New York. Vulture, on one of its recaps of Glee, remarked: "[C]haracters who are big-eyed but a little broken inside and desperately in love with New York are what Sarah Jessica Parker does best. I don't think her stint on Glee will revolutionize the show or her career or anything, but she's absolutely an asset, and I'm glad she's onboard". In 2013, Parker provided her voice for one of the characters of the animated film Escape from Planet Earth, and played Gloria Steinem in deleted scenes of the biographical drama Lovelace. In 2015, she starred in the independent romantic comedy All Roads Lead to Rome, as an American journalist revisiting Italy with her rebellious daughter.

=== 2016–present: Divorce, Broadway return, and And Just Like That... ===
Beginning in late-2016, Parker executive produced and starred in the HBO dramedy series Divorce, as Frances Dufresne, a married woman who has an affair which precipitates her divorce. Drawn to the "complexity and promise" of the story she was also intrigued by the doubtful likability of her character, remarking: "I like that Frances is very real to me. She's both honorable and messy. She's both exacting and untethered, but I think she's a very real person." The series ran for three seasons and earned acclaim from critics; The A.V. Club noted: "Parker's gift, even on Sex and the City, has always been a well-timed comeback or a reaction shot. [Her character] is not a reboot of Carrie Bradshaw, but she doesn't exactly force the actor to stray from her comfort zone, either. That's not necessarily a bad thing: It's a pleasure to see her back, shaking her head at just the right moment". For her role, she earned a Golden Globe nomination.

In 2018, Parker headlined and produced the independent drama Here and Now, playing a New York City singer who gets a life-changing medical diagnosis.

In February 2020, Parker and her husband, Broderick, starred in a revival of Neil Simon's Plaza Suite at Boston's Colonial Theatre for two weeks. Previews at the Hudson Theatre had been set for March 2020 and its official debut was scheduled for April 2020, but this was later postponed and eventually canceled due to Parker testing positive for COVID-19.

And Just Like That..., the Sex and the City revival, was confirmed by HBO Max in January 2021. The first season premiered on December 9, 2021.

In 2022, Parker reprised her role as Sarah Sanderson in Hocus Pocus 2 for Disney+.

== Other ventures ==
=== Fashion industry ===
Parker has been labeled as a fashion icon by many publications.

In 2000, Parker hosted the MTV Movie Awards in 14 different outfits. She has also become the face of many of the world's biggest fashion brands through her work in a variety of advertising campaigns. In August 2003, Parker signed a lucrative deal with Garnier to appear in TV and print advertising promoting their Nutrisse hair products.

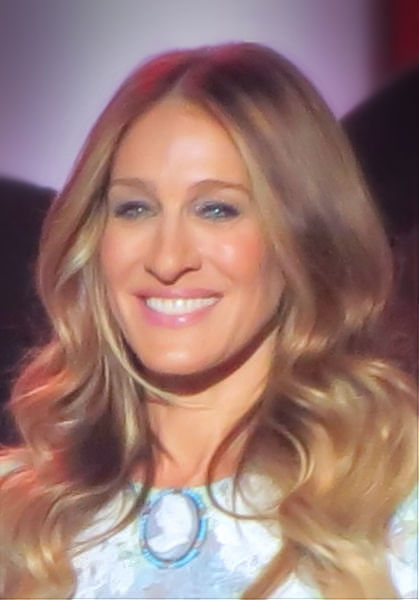
Parker in 2012

In early 2004, shortly after the last season of Sex and the City wrapped up, Parker signed a $38 million contract with the Gap. It was the first multi-season contract in the clothing company's history, in which Parker was to appear in their upcoming fall ads, and continue until the spring of 2005. The endorsement sparked many levels of criticism from the public; the glamorous, urban-chic fashionista that her character Carrie Bradshaw has branded her with, was ironic considering the Gap maintains an image that does not promote high-end fashion. Wendy Liebmann, president of WSL strategic retail, suggested Gap executives "felt the need for an iconic but contemporary face to represent [themselves]. They were perhaps feeling a little insecure, a little in need of some high luster around the brand". The ad campaigns were a success, she having given the Gap a fresh face that appeared in many commercials and promotions.

In March 2005, Parker's contract with the Gap ended, and she was replaced with then 17-year-old British soul singer Joss Stone. A rising star at the time, Stone's replacing of Parker was a puzzling move to the public. The company then stated: "While Gap will always seek partnerships with celebrities, musicians and rising stars, we don't have any future plans to sign a single person to a multi-season deal like the unique and special relationship we enjoyed with Sarah Jessica".

Parker released her own perfume in 2005, called Lovely. In March 2007, Parker announced the launch of her own fashion line, "Bitten", in partnership with discount clothing chain Steve & Barry's. The line, featuring clothing items and accessories under $20, launched on June 7, 2007, exclusively at Steve and Barry's. In July 2007, following the success of Lovely, Parker released her second fragrance, Covet. In 2007, Parker was a guest on Project Runway for the second challenge. In 2008, Covet Pure Bloom was released as continuous series of Covet. In February 2009, as part of the Lovely collection, Parker launched a series of three new fragrances called Dawn, Endless, and Twilight.

On February 28, 2014, Parker started the SJP Collection, a footwear line, at Nordstrom. In June 2015, she was named the new spokesmodel for Jordache Jeans. In April 2018, Parker partnered with Gilt to launch her ready-to-wear bridal collection for modern nontraditional brides.

In November 2023, Parker teamed up with Lele Sadoughi to curate a collection of accessories including brooches, headbands and more.

=== Production work ===
Parker runs a production company, Pretty Matches, which has created content for HBO and other channels since 2009. She founded the company in 2005 with Alison Benson, following an introduction from her agent Kevin Huvane. Through it, they produced the series Divorce (2016–2019) and the film Here and Now (2018). The company aims to increase female representation in media production.

In 2025, Parker served as an executive producer on the documentary The Librarians focusing on librarians combating book banning in the United States. In May 2025, Parker received the PEN/Audible Literary Service Award from PEN America at a gala in New York City, being called an "indispensable defender" of the freedom to read, both for this documentary and "for uplifting underrepresented voices through her own publishing imprint SJP Lit." In 2026, Parker produced Bang My Box: The Robin Byrd Story directed by Jyllian Gunther and Stephanie Schwam revolving around the life and career of Robin Byrd for HBO Documentary Films.

=== Books and wine ===
In October 2016, Parker announced an imprint with Crown Publishing Group, SJP for Hogarth, and in 2017, her partnership with American Library Association (ALA) to create Book Club Central, a new online platform that will provide reading resources, including recommendations, expert-curated book lists, and other content for book clubs and readers. In June 2023, she partnered with an independent publisher Zando to create her own imprint, SJP Lit.

In 2019, Parker entered into a collaboration partnership with New Zealand winery Invivo & Co to produce a range of wines. Together each year they produce a vintage, award-winning Invivo X, Sarah Jessica Parker Sauvignon Blanc, from Marlborough New Zealand; and the Invivo X, Sarah Jessica Parker Rosé from Provence.

In 2025, Parker was one of the judges for the 2025 Booker Prize.

== Personal life ==
Parker was in a relationship with actor Robert Downey Jr. from 1984 until 1991. They met on the set of Firstborn. His drug problem affected their relationship. She said: "I believed I was the person holding him together." She later briefly dated John F. Kennedy Jr.

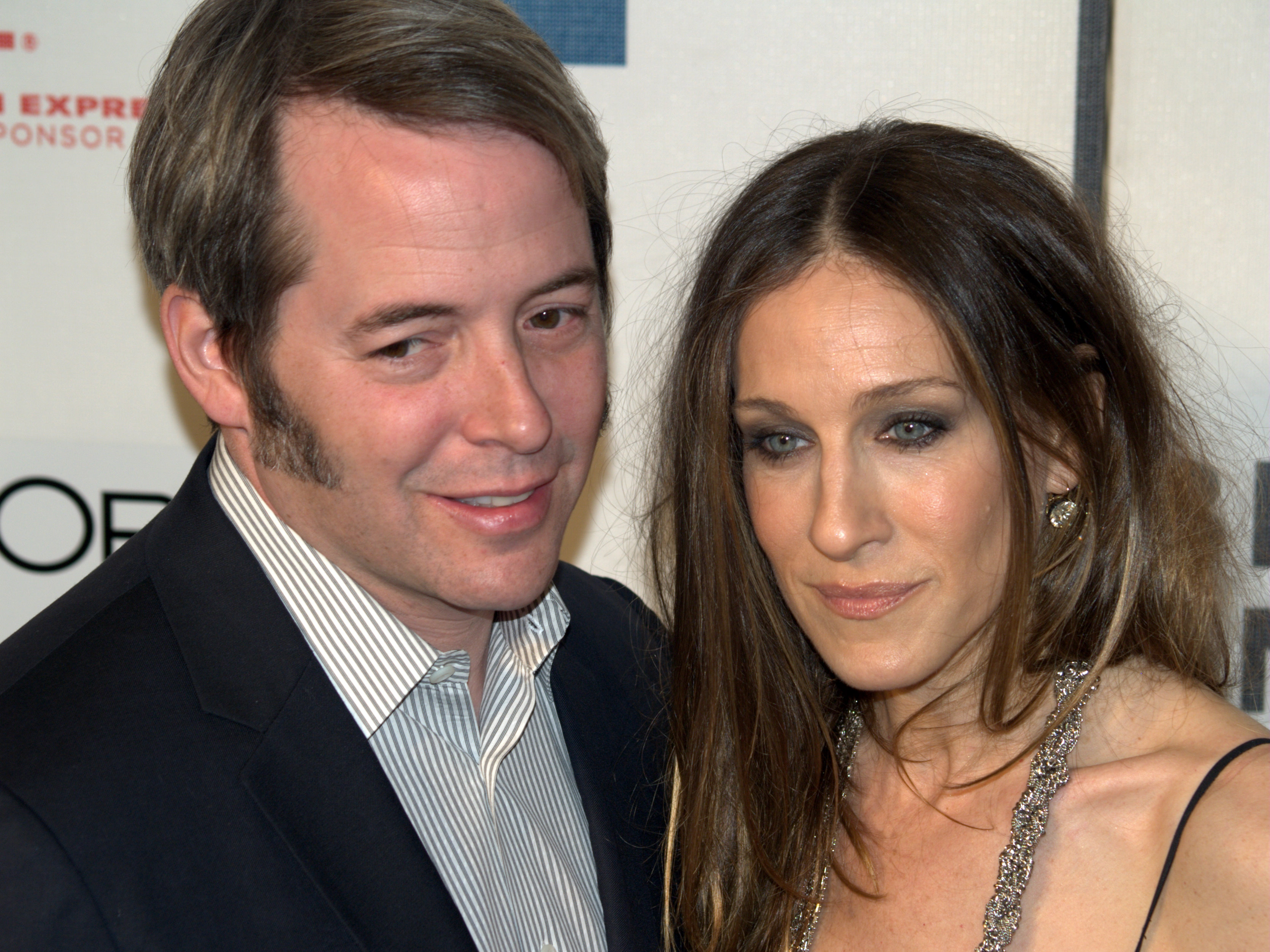
Matthew Broderick and Parker in 2009

Parker married actor Matthew Broderick on May 19, 1997, in Manhattan's Lower East Side, in an Episcopal ceremony officiated by Broderick's sister, the Rev. Janet Broderick Kraft. The couple had been introduced by one of her brothers at the Naked Angels theater company, where she and Broderick both performed. Their son James Wilkie Broderick was born October 28, 2002. Their twin daughters, Marion and Tabitha, were born June 22, 2009, via surrogacy. Their respective middle names, Elwell and Hodge, are from maternal ancestors she discovered in the first episode of Who Do You Think You Are?, which originally aired March 5, 2010.

Since 2009, Parker has lived in Greenwich Village with her husband and children. In 2017, it was reported that the couple were combining two townhouses they had purchased for $35 million on West 11th Street in 2016, with renovations continuing into 2019. The family also spends considerable time at their second home near Kilcar, a village in County Donegal, Ireland, where Broderick spent summers as a child.

== Credits and accolades ==
Sarah Jessica Parker awards and nominations
Awards and nominations
Award	Wins	Nominations
Golden Globe	4	9
Emmy Awards	2	10
Screen Actors Guild Awards	2	9

Totals (Note: Certain award groups do not simply award one winner. They acknowledge several different recipients, have runners-up, and have third place. Since this is a specific recognition and is different from losing an award, runner-up mentions are considered wins in this award tally. For simplification and to avoid errors, each award in this list has been presumed to have had a prior nomination.)
- Wins: 8
- Nominations: 28

Parker received ten Emmy Award nominations, all for Sex and the City, winning Outstanding Comedy Series (as producer) in 2001 and Outstanding Lead Actress in a Comedy Series in 2004. She also received nine Golden Globe nominations, with four wins (all for Sex and the City) in 2000, 2001, 2002 and 2004. Some of her critically acclaimed and commercially successful films are:

- Footloose (1984)
- Girls Just Want to Have Fun (1985)
- Flight of the Navigator (1986)
- L.A. Story (1991)
- Honeymoon in Vegas (1992)
- Hocus Pocus (1993)
- Ed Wood (1994)
- The First Wives Club (1996)
- Mars Attacks! (1996)
- The Family Stone (2005)
- Failure to Launch (2006)
- Sex and the City (2008)
- Sex and the City 2 (2010)
- New Year's Eve (2011)
- Escape from Planet Earth (2013)
