= Crochet bikini =

Knitted swimwear or bikini

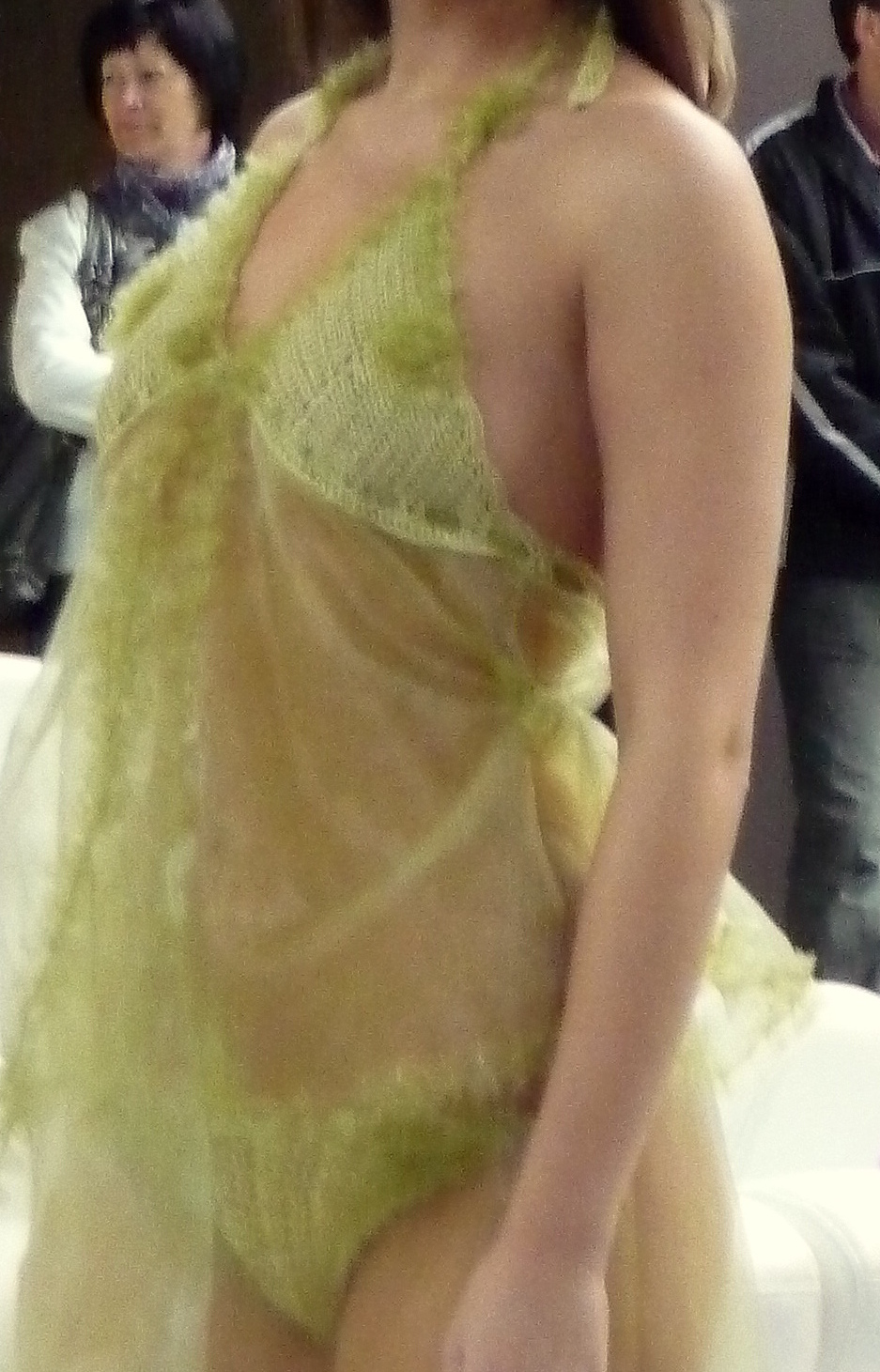

The crochet bikini or crocheted bikini is a bikini / swimsuit crafted from yarn that has been worn since at least the 1970s. The style gained popularity in the late 2010s as a form of boho-chic and as new brands emerged.

A crochet bikini created by Brazilian street artist Maria Solange Ferrarini has been the focus of several lawsuits that received international attention. Turkish American entrepreneur Ipek Irgit took the idea of Ferrarini's crochet bikini during a visit to Brazil and claimed copyright on the design. Since starting her company in 2013, Irgit has made copyright claims against any similar swimwear and never credited Ferrarini. In 2019, Ferrarini was awarded her own copyright on the design she created.

== History ==
Crochet motifs became a material used for bikinis in the 1970s, among other alternative materials. Actress Robin Byrd became known for wearing a crochet bikini during the 1970s, and the look became closely associated with her image.

Maria Solange Ferrarini was born 1956 or 1957 in São Carlos, Brazil to a seamstress mother and bricklayer father. She was taught to crochet at an early age and sewed out of economic necessity. She sold her crafted garments on the beach in Trancoso, Brazil. As the beach town became more popular, her sales increased. British model Kelly Brook was photographed wearing one of these bikinis during her visit to the town in 2012. Ferrarini signs all of her crochet bikinis.

In 2013, Turkish American entrepreneur Ipek Irgit launched her crochet bikini under the trademark of Kiini. The product gained attention after model Dree Hemingway posted a picture of herself in a Kiini. Irgit, who had previously worked for New York design companies, including Max Mara, branded her product by creating a portmanteau of her initials and the word bikini.

== Initial claim ==
In 2014, Irgit obtained copyright protection for the crochet bikini design and claimed trade dress rights. In 2015, Irgit sued Victoria's Secret for a similar crochet bikini. Later, Irgit sued Neiman Marcus and two other swimwear companies for trade violations. Sally Wu, a colleague of Irgit's in the production of the Kiini, told The New York Times that Irgit feared that the discovery process of those lawsuits would reveal that Irgit had not actually designed the Kiini. (Irgit denied Wu's claim.) The discovery process never proceeded, and Irgit and Victoria's Secret settled their suit out of court.

== Other lawsuits and versions ==
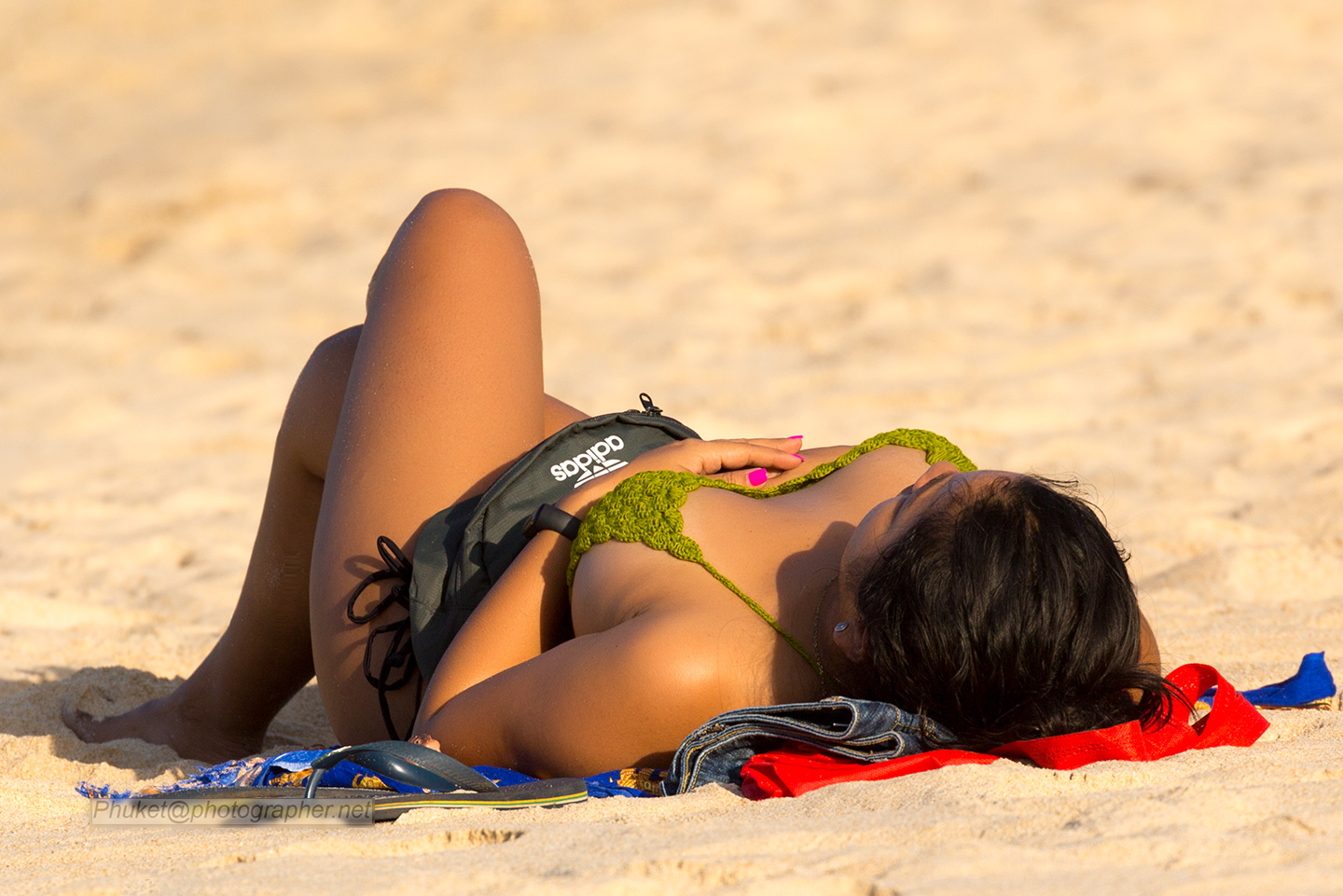

In April 2018, Kiini filed a federal lawsuit in the Southern District of New York, against Neiman Marcus, alleging unfair competition. A month later, Kiini amended its lawsuit against Neiman Marcus to explicitly add PilyQ, Bloomingdales, Lord & Taylor, Macy's and other retailers as defendants.

PilyQ is a swimwear brand which sells a line of crochet bikinis under its brand name Platinum. Following the lawsuit, Jason Forge, the husband of one of PilyQ's owners, sought out Brazilian street artist Maria Solange Ferrarini, to negotiate a licensing deal for her crochet bikini designs. Under the terms of the deal, Ferrarini was paid about $5,100 in 2018, and would earn an annual licensing fee of $7,700 as from 2019.

== Today ==
As of October 2019, Neiman Marcus, Target and other retailers continue to sell their own versions of crochet bikinis, while Irgit's lawsuits against them, and Ferrarini's lawsuit against Irgit, continue to work their way through the courts. Ferrarini was awarded her own copyright on her crochet bikini design by the United States Copyright Office in January 2019. Ferrarini's copyright was awarded under the title "Ferrarini Bikini".

Crochet bikinis can also be crafted as a DIY item. There are many crochet bikini lookalikes for the Kiini.

As of March 2023, retailers such as Urban Outfitters, ASOS, and Amazon are selling crocheted bikinis as well as cover-ups and dresses.
