= Trancoso, Bahia =

Coordinates: 16°35′26″S 39°05′45″W

Trancoso
- District
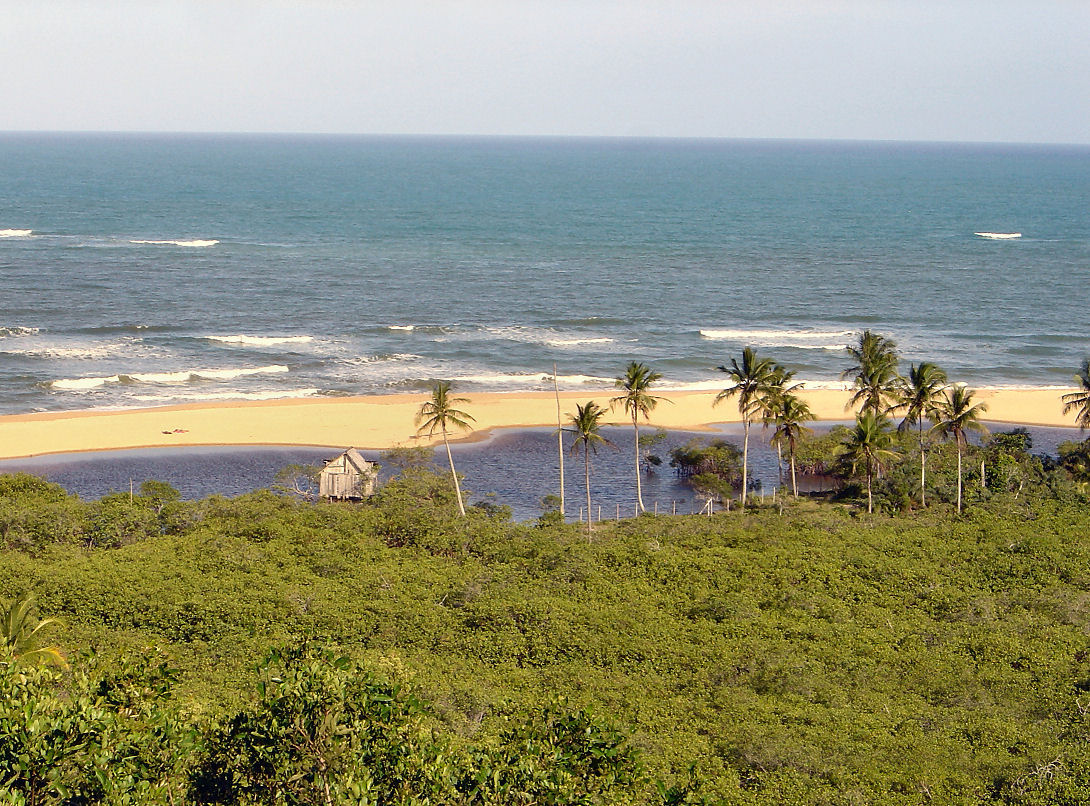
- Interactive map of Trancoso
- Country: Brazil
- State: Bahia
- City: Porto Seguro

Area
  - Total: 2,787 km^{2} (1,076 sq mi)

Population (2010)
  - Total: 11.006
  - Density: 39.48/km^{2} (102.3/sq mi)
- Website: trancosobahia.com.br

Trancoso is a district in the municipality of Porto Seguro in the state of Bahia, Brazil. Once a small fishing village, the town is now known for its beaches and has increased in popularity since gaining international attention around 2000 while retaining an eco-friendly appeal.

== History ==
The region was the landing point of the Portuguese explorer, Pedro Álvares Cabral onto Brazil, on April 22, 1500. It was founded by Jesuit Priests in 1583, with the name São João Baptista dos Indios.

Development of the beach town accelerated in 1999, when a highway opened linking to Trancoso to Porto Seguro, a commercial hub that has an airport.

Artist Solange Ferrarini, created a distinctive crochet bikini which was first sold on the beaches of Trancoso and later copied as a kiini.

== Geography ==
Shaped as a rough rectangular shape, the village retains the original style of its housing architecture. It is famous for its beaches, such as Praia dos Nativos, Praia dos Coqueiros and Praia do Espelho. In recent years the location has been developed by the hotel industry, including the French Club Méditerranée, which has boosted real estate value.

The main square is known as 'Quadrado', although it is rectangular. To its east is a sixteenth-century Catholic Church, São João Batista, dedicated to Saint John, the Baptist.

The federal Ministry of the Environment is currently expanding several National Parks and Natural Reserves nearby with the goal of preserving remaining areas of Atlantic Rain Forest. In addition, Trancoso is located at the starting point of a state Environmental Protection Area, the APA Caraíva-Trancoso, whose goal is to curtail touristic and economical development in the region, thereby minimizing negative impacts that may harm this biosphere.

== Festivals ==
On January 20, the 'Quadrado' is the site of a festival honoring Saint Sebastian, during which the locals sing and play drums and guitars. The main verse is: "São Sebastião, hoje chegou o dia. Vimos festejar com toda a alegria!", translating to: Saint Sebastian, your day has arrived. We have come to joyfully celebrate it!

== Demography ==
As in most of Brazil, the population is a mixture of native, African and Portuguese or other European descendants. In recent years, "snowbirds" such as Canadians, Italians, Portuguese, Dutch, Greeks, Israeli, and other have purchased homes, bed and breakfast, restaurants, and stores here or in other Porto Seguro sections, such as Arraial d'Ajuda and eventually settled down in Trancoso.

== Attractions ==
The Quadrado, or main square, is bordered by colorful houses and a white little church overseeing the Atlantic Ocean. The Quadrado, its colorful houses and church are UNESCO protected.

The main attractions of Trancoso are the white sandy beaches, most of them are protected by reefs and form natural swimming pools at low tide.

=== Praia do Espelho (Mirror Beach) ===
This beach has powder white sand and natural warm swimming pools created by reefs at low tide. Praia do Espelho is situated about a half an hour from Trancoso, following a winding dirt road that is only accessible during sunny weather.

=== Praia dos Coqueiros (Coconut Palm Tree Beach) ===
Praia dos Coqueiros, or Coconut Palm tree Beach, is a small beach with medium waves and most of the time protected by coral reefs. This beach has the nickname Palmtree beach because of the more than hundred palmtrees that are typical for this region of Bahia.

=== Praia da Pedra Grande (Big Rock Beach) ===
This beach is about a kilometer away from Praia Coqueiros. It's narrower than the other beaches and with fewer tourists. Praia Dos Coqueiros is the last beach where you will find restaurants, beach bars and some beach hotels. The more distant beaches are deserted and known locally as beaches to practice surfing and topless sunbathing.

=== Praia dos Nativos (Locals’ beach) ===
Praias dos Nativos has beach bars and beach hotels.
