= Pull Out =

- Directed by: Jyllian Gunther
- Written by: Jyllian Gunther
- Produced by: Wren Arthur; Jyllian Gunther; Jonathan Shoemaker
- Release date: 2004
- Running time: 69 minutes
- Country: United States

Pull Out is a feature documentary directed by Jyllian Gunther, released in 2004. It reflects on Gunther's past relationships and why they failed.

== Awards ==
The film was an "official selection" of the following award organizations:

- Hamptons International Film Festival
- Raindance Film Festival
- Newport International Film Festival
