= Bang My Box: The Robin Byrd Story =

2026 American documentary film

- Official poster
- Directed by: Jyllian Gunther; Stephanie Schwam
- Produced by: Jyllian Gunther; Stephanie Schwam; Sarah Jessica Parker; Alison Benson; Caroline Waterlow
- Cinematography: Eric Arthur Fernandez
- Edited by: Jeremy Stulberg
- Music by: Roger Neill
- Production companies: HBO Documentary Films; Pretty Matches Productions; Laylow Pictures
- Distributed by: HBO
- Release dates: June 9, 2026 (Tribeca); June 30, 2026 (United States)
- Running time: 80 minutes
- Country: United States
- Language: English

Bang My Box: The Robin Byrd Story is a 2026 American documentary film directed and produced by Jyllian Gunther and Stephanie Schwam. It explores the life and career of Robin Byrd, who hosted the public-access television series The Robin Byrd Show. Sarah Jessica Parker serves as a producer under her Pretty Matches Productions banner.

It had its world premiere at the Tribeca Festival on June 9, 2026, and was released on June 30, 2026, by HBO Documentary Films.

== Premise ==
It explores the life and career of Robin Byrd, who hosted the public-access television series The Robin Byrd Show. Byrd was also a champion for LGBTQ people, HIV/AIDS awareness, and safe sex. Byrd appears in the film alongside Cheri Oteri, Annie Sprinkle, Sandra Bernhard, Porsche Lynn, Heather Hunter, Lou Cass, Kirsten Fleming, Bob Morris and Michael Musto. Additional interviews include civil rights activists and lawyers alongside former guests of her show.

== Release ==
It had its world premiere at the Tribeca Festival on June 9, 2026. It also screened at the Provincetown International Film Festival on June 11, 2026. It was released on HBO on June 30, 2026.
