= Jyllian Gunther =

American director and film producer

Jyllian Gunther is an American director, writer, and film and television producer. She is known for her role as co-executive producer on the BBC genealogy documentary series, Who Do You Think You Are? and director of the History Channel/A&E-produced documentary Black Patriots: Heroes of the American Revolution.

== Career overview ==
Gunther has directed and produced a range of documentary projects, including serving as director and co-executive producer for the HBO series Swiping America and an untitled pilot for Condé Nast and Amazon. She was also a co-executive producer, director, and writer for multiple episodes of the NBC series Who Do You Think You Are, featuring celebrities such as Allison Janney, Nick Offerman, and Billy Porter. Her work on the History/A&E documentary Black Patriots: Heroes of the American Revolution, featuring Kareem Abdul-Jabbar, earned a Christopher Award. In 2026, she co-directed and produced alongside Stephanie Schwam, Bang My Box: The Robin Byrd Story produced by Sarah Jessica Parker, for HBO Documentary Films. As a producer, she contributed to ABC’s seven-part docuseries The Last Defense, executive-produced by Viola Davis. She also directed, produced, and wrote six short films for The New Yorker Presents, a series by JigSaw, Amazon, and The New Yorker magazine. Her first documentary, Pull Out, produced by Wren Arthur, received a national Emmy Award, and her second feature documentary, The New Public, aired on PBS and is distributed by Kino Lorber, accompanied by an educational curriculum developed by Teachers College at Columbia University.

=== News reporting ===
Gunther served as a reporter and co-producer for NPR's This American Life. She received a national Emmy Award for writing and directing a series of public service announcements for PBS. She began her television career as a staff writer for Nickelodeon and later worked as a freelance writer and producer for promotional content. She also served as a producer and director on various docuseries for networks including Discovery Channel, TLC, MTV, AMC, IFC, and We TV.

== Filmography ==
Title	Role	Notes
Bang My Box: The Robin Byrd Story	co-director/co-producer	feature HBO documentary
Sunset and the Mockingbird	director/producer/writer	short documentary film
The New Public	director/producer/camera	feature film
Pull Out	director/producer/writer	feature film
The New Yorker Presents	director/writer/producer	series
Who Do You Think You Are	director/supervising producer	series
Made	director/producer	series
Love High	director/producer	series pilot
THINKPORT.ORG	co-director/writer	series
This American Life	reporter	series
