= Failure to Launch =

2006 film by Tom Dey

- Theatrical release poster
- Directed by: Tom Dey
- Written by: Tom J. Astle; Matt Ember
- Produced by: Scott Rudin; Scott Aversano
- Starring: Matthew McConaughey; Sarah Jessica Parker; Zooey Deschanel; Justin Bartha; Bradley Cooper; Terry Bradshaw; Kathy Bates
- Cinematography: Claudio Miranda
- Edited by: Steven Rosenblum
- Music by: Rolfe Kent
- Production company: Scott Rudin Productions
- Distributed by: Paramount Pictures
- Release date: March 10, 2006
- Running time: 96 minutes
- Language: English
- Budget: $50 million
- Box office: $130.2 million

Failure to Launch is a 2006 American romantic comedy film directed by Tom Dey, and starring Matthew McConaughey and Sarah Jessica Parker alongside Zooey Deschanel, Justin Bartha, Bradley Cooper, Terry Bradshaw, and Kathy Bates. The film focuses on a 35-year-old man living with his parents who shows no interest in leaving the comfortable life that they, especially his mother, have made for him. Released by Paramount Pictures on March 10, 2006, it was met with generally negative critical reviews but was a commercial success, grossing $130.2 million against a $50 million budget.

== Plot ==
Thirty-five-year-old Tripp still lives with his parents Al and Sue in Baltimore. His best friends Demo and Ace also still live in their parents' homes. Tripp has many casual girlfriends. When he is tired of them, he invites them to "his place"—and when they realize he still lives at home, they dump him.

Al and Sue are fascinated when their friends, whose adult son recently left home, reveal that they hired an expert to get him to move out. The expert is Paula, who believes that men continue to live at home because they have low self-esteem. Her approach is to establish a relationship with the man to build his confidence, then transfer his attachment from his parents to her.

However, Tripp does not fit the profiles of Paula's previous clients, as he has normal social skills, good self-esteem, and a good job he enjoys. After some time dating, when he sees that she might be getting too attached, he stages an awkward encounter with his parents. Paula thwarts Tripp's usual M.O. attempt to dump her by having sex with him while developing real feelings.

Paula and Tripp find themselves in unfamiliar waters, so they confide in their friends. Paula's housemate Kit theorises that Paula created this essentially con artist persona because a man who lived with his parents broke her heart. But Paula is shocked to learn why Tripp lives at home: his life collapsed when his fiancée died, and his family has been his solace.

Ace discovers Paula's profession and that she is duping Tripp, so he blackmails Paula for a date with Kit. Although Kit is more attracted to Demo, she and Ace fall in love. Ace then "outs" Paula to Demo, who tells Tripp.

Tripp confronts his parents and Paula over the scam, breaks up with her, and takes up residence in the sailboat he had been saving for. He forgives his parents but not Paula.

Tripp's parents and friends devise a plan to reconcile the two. They tie up and gag him, locking him and Paula together in a room. Paula pours her heart out, and Tripp forgives her.

Al and Sue are finally in their empty nest, singing "Hit the Road, Tripp". This fades into the closing credits over the Ray Charles song "Hit the Road, Jack", as Tripp and Paula sail away on his boat.

== Cast ==
- Matthew McConaughey as Tripp
- Sarah Jessica Parker as Paula
- Zooey Deschanel as Katherine "Kit"
- Justin Bartha as Philip "Ace"
- Bradley Cooper as Demo
- Terry Bradshaw as Al
- Kathy Bates as Sue
- Tyrel Jackson Williams as Jeffrey
- Katheryn Winnick as Melissa
- Rob Corddry as gun salesman
- Patton Oswalt as techie guy
- Stephen Tobolowsky as Bud
- Adam Alexi-Malle as Mr. Axelrod
- Mageina Tovah as barista (uncredited)

== Production ==
The rock climbing scenes were filmed in Cherokee Rock Village in Leesburg, Alabama.

One of the chipmunks used in the film was killed when a handler slipped on the set and fell, crushing the chipmunk.

== Release ==
In its opening weekend, the film grossed a total of $24.6 million, ranking first in the United States box office results for that weekend. The film grossed a total of $88.7 million in the United States box office and made $128,406,887 worldwide.

== Reception ==
On Rotten Tomatoes the film holds an approval rating of 23% based on 150 reviews. The site's critics consensus states: "The few comic gags sprinkled throughout the movie fail to spice up this formulaic rom-com." On Metacritic, the film has a weighted average score of 47 out of 100 based on 31 critics, indicating "mixed or average" reviews. Audiences polled by CinemaScore gave the film an average grade of "A−" on an A+ to F scale.

Richard Roeper stated the film was "completely unbelievable". Some otherwise unfavorable reviews singled out Zooey Deschanel's performance as the film's highlight. Stephanie Zacharek of Salon wrote that "Even with a relatively small role, she blows the whole movie to smithereens".

== See also ==
- Boomerang Generation
- The 40 Year Old Virgin
- Twixters
