= I Don't Know How She Does It =

2011 film directed by Douglas McGrath

- Theatrical release poster
- Directed by: Douglas McGrath
- Written by: Aline Brosh McKenna
- Based on: I Don't Know How She Does It by Allison Pearson
- Produced by: Donna Gigliotti
- Starring: Sarah Jessica Parker; Pierce Brosnan; Greg Kinnear; Christina Hendricks; Kelsey Grammer; Seth Meyers; Olivia Munn
- Cinematography: Stuart Dryburgh
- Edited by: Camilla Toniolo
- Music by: Aaron Zigman
- Distributed by: The Weinstein Company
- Release date: September 16, 2011
- Running time: 89 minutes
- Country: United States
- Language: English
- Budget: $24 million
- Box office: $31.4 million

I Don't Know How She Does It is a 2011 American comedy film based on Allison Pearson's 2002 novel of the same name. Directed by Douglas McGrath, the film stars Sarah Jessica Parker, Pierce Brosnan and Greg Kinnear.

The plot surrounds the trials and tribulations of Kate Reddy, a married mother of two, as she navigates her life as a finance executive and the breadwinner for her family.

The film was released on September 16, 2011, and was a critical and commercial flop.

== Plot ==
When Kate Reddy receives a reminder from her daughter Emily about her kindergarten's bake sale, she buys a store-baked pie and puts it in a glass pie plate. Back home, Kate is greeted by her husband, Richard. They attempt to have sex, but she falls asleep due to exhaustion.

In the middle of the night, Kate goes to check on her children. The next morning, she is greeted with a hug by her two-year-old son, Ben. Kate pleads for Richard to stay home as the babysitter Paula is not yet there to take over.

Kate meets her friend, Allison, a single mother working as a lawyer. They later encounter "the Momsters" – Wendy Best and Janine LoPietro, who are both stay-at-home mothers. Kate's boss Clark Cooper assigns her a new project with Jack Abelhammer. In the morning as she leaves her house with her children calling out to her, she cries from guilt towards her children.

Later, Kate arrives in NYC and meets Jack with Momo, her junior research analyst. Momo is opposed to Kate's lifestyle and is highly career-driven. Kate apologizes to Jack before realizing that she has lice. She scratches her head profusely but manages to get through the meeting. Richard's mother Marla displays dismay with how much both Kate and Richard are working and hopes that Kate will spend more time with the children.

Kate travels between Boston and NYC, juggling her personal life and the major project with Jack. She is impressed by Jack's character. He begins to show admiration for Kate. Jack reveals that he was married once to someone he loved who became sick and passed away. He sends Kate home by getting her a cab.

Kate becomes more conscious of her contact with Jack. After a meeting in Boston, Momo reveals that she is pregnant. That night, Kate and Richard fight over the new babysitter.

After a meeting in Cleveland, Kate and Jack go to dinner. Afterwards, he takes her bowling. Kate reassures Allison that there is nothing romantic between them. She later informs Momo that she will be taking five days off from work to spend time with her family in Atlanta for Thanksgiving.

Momo reveals to Kate that she is planning to keep the baby. Later, Bunce teases Kate for taking time off from work. While in Atlanta, she silences her phone to be fully present during the week. All is going well as Kate prepares Thanksgiving dinner for the family. She is called back to work, but before she leaves, Ben finally speaks his first words, "Bye Bye, Mama".

Before the pitch, Momo experiences morning sickness. Despite her initial worries, Kate is reassured by Jack that the pitch went well. He informs her that he will be having lunch with the investor. The lunch goes well, but Jack later realizes he had many missed calls from Kate. The missed calls are from Richard, who could not get in touch with her.

The calls were to inform Kate that Ben has fallen down the stairs and hit his head. She rushes back to join them in the hospital, after which Kate and Richard have a fight. The next morning, she promises to build a snowman with the family the next time it snows. At work, Kate receives a phone call and surprise visit from Jack. He confesses his romantic feelings for her. Kate appreciates his feelings but states that she is very much in love with Richard and only wants to be with him.

Kate bids Jack farewell and rushes off to Emily's kindergarten, upon seeing it is snowing. She and Richard walk towards each other and she apologizes for prioritizing work over family. He tells her that he will be taking on more responsibility. The Momsters then appear, with Kate proudly exclaiming that she indeed brought a store-bought pie to the bake sale. Months later, Momo gives birth to a baby boy.

== Cast ==
- Sarah Jessica Parker as Kate Reddy
- Pierce Brosnan as Jack Abelhammer
- Greg Kinnear as Richard Reddy
- Christina Hendricks as Allison Henderson
- Kelsey Grammer as Clark Cooper
- Seth Meyers as Chris Bunce
- Olivia Munn as Momo Hahn
- Jane Curtin as Marla Reddy
- Mark Blum as Lew Reddy
- Busy Philipps as Wendy Best
- Sarah Shahi as Janine LoPietro
- Jessica Szohr as Paula

== Release ==
I Don't Know How She Does It was released for North American audiences on September 16, 2011.

=== Box office ===
I Don't Know How She Does It opened at #6 on its opening weekend with $4,402,201. It earned $9,662,284 in the United States as well as $20,889,211 internationally for a worldwide total of $30,551,495.

== Reception ==
I Don't Know How She Does It received unfavorable reviews from both critics and audiences alike. On Rotten Tomatoes, the film has an approval rating of 17% based on 113 reviews, with an average rating of 3.99/10. The site described the film as "[a] limp comedy with a hopelessly outdated viewpoint on gender, featuring Sarah Jessica Parker in rote Carrie-mode." On Metacritic, the film has a weighted average score of 38 out of 100, based on 31 critics, indicating "generally unfavorable" reviews. Audiences polled by CinemaScore gave the film an average grade of "B−" on an A+ to F scale.

Sarah Jessica Parker earned a Razzie Award nomination as Worst Actress for her performance in the film (also for New Year's Eve), but "lost" to Adam Sandler for his performance in drag in Jack and Jill.
