= The World's Billionaires =

Annual ranking by Forbes magazine

- List of the world's billionaires, ranked in order of net worth
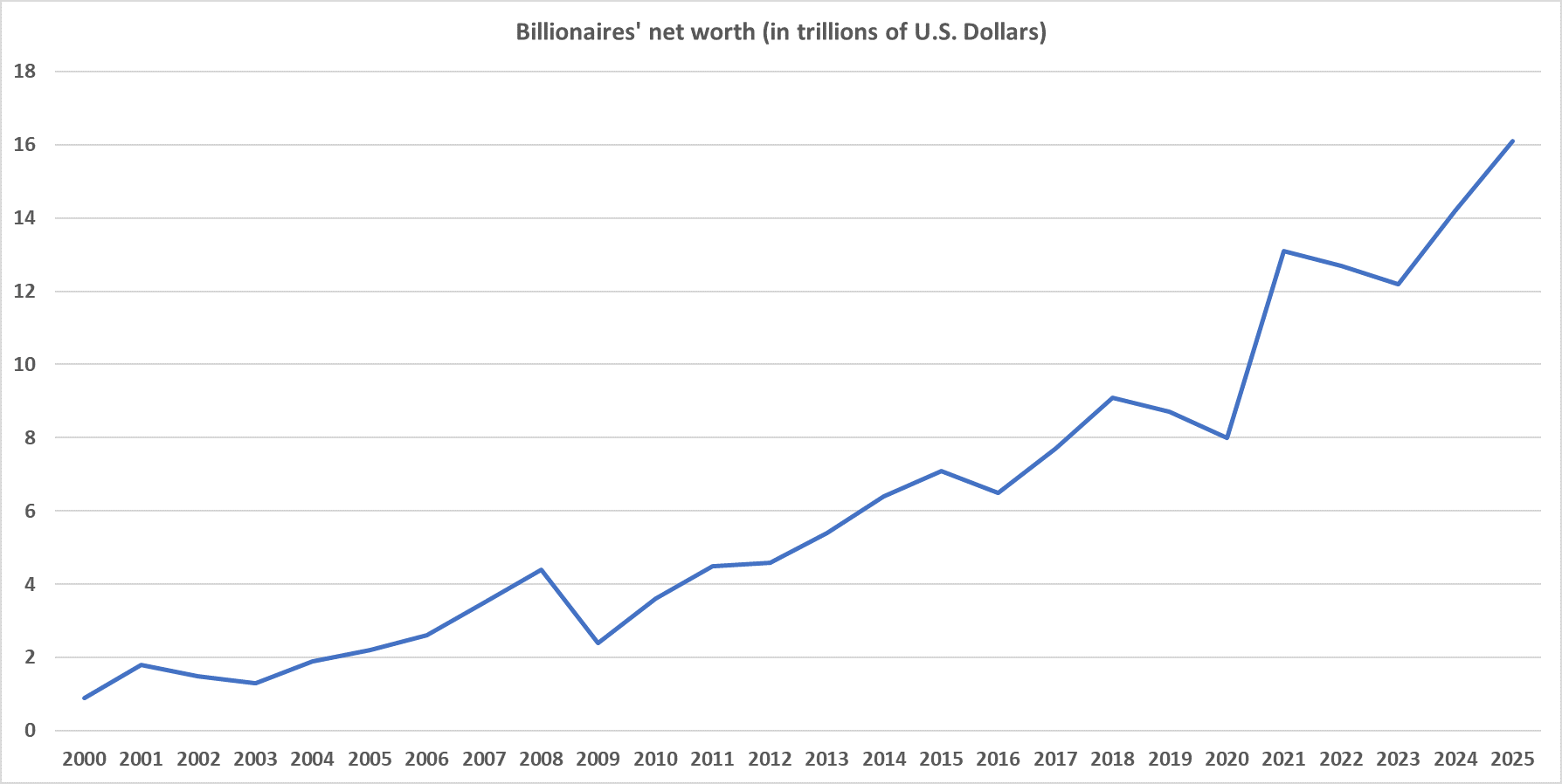
- The net worth of the world's billionaires increased from less than $1 trillion in 2000 to over $16 trillion in 2025.

Publication details
- Publisher: Whale Media Investments; Forbes family
- Publication: Forbes
- First published: March 1987
- Latest publication: March 10, 2026

2026 list details
- Wealthiest: Elon Musk
- Net worth (1st): ▲US$839 billion
- Number of billionaires: ▲3,428 (from 3,028)
- Total list net worth value: ▲US$20.1 trillion (from US$16.1 trillion)
- Number of women: ▲481
- Number of men: ▲2,947
- New members to the list: ▲309

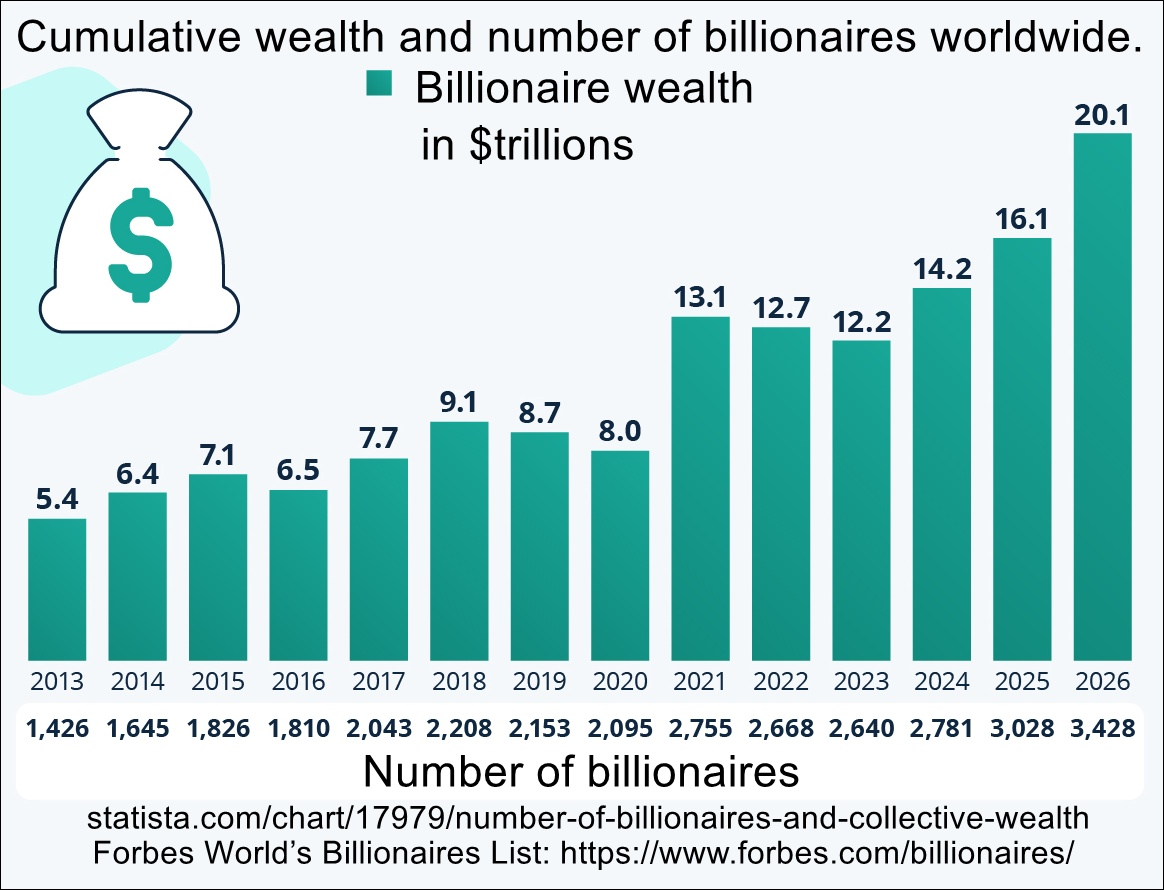
World's billionaires. Number and total wealth by year. Trillions of dollars.

The World's Billionaires is an annual ranking by the American business magazine Forbes of people who are billionaires, i.e., they are estimated to have a net worth of US$1 billion or more. The list was first published in March 1987. The net worth of each individual is cited in United States dollars, based on their documented assets, and accounting for debt and other factors. This ranking excludes royalty and dictators whose wealth comes from their positions, as well as people whose wealth is not able to be completely ascertained.

In 2018, Amazon founder Jeff Bezos was first ranked at the top and became the first centibillionaire included in the ranking, surpassing Microsoft founder Bill Gates, who had topped the list 18 of the previous 24 years. In 2022, Bezos was surpassed by Elon Musk. In 2023, Musk was surpassed by French businessman Bernard Arnault, the first French person to top the list. In 2025 and 2026, Musk once again topped the list.

== Methodology ==
Each year, Forbes employs a team of over 50 reporters from a variety of countries to track the activity of the world's wealthiest individuals and sometimes groups or families – who share wealth. Preliminary surveys are sent to those who may qualify for the list. According to Forbes, they received three types of responses – some people try to inflate their wealth, others cooperate but leave out details, and some refuse to answer any questions. Business deals are then scrutinized and estimates of valuable assets – land, homes, vehicles, artwork, etc. – are made. Interviews are conducted to vet the figures and improve the estimate of an individual's holdings. Finally, positions in a publicly traded stock are priced to market on a date roughly a month before publication. Privately held companies are priced by the prevailing price-to-sales or price-to-earnings ratios. Known debt is subtracted from assets to get a final estimate of an individual's estimated worth in United States dollars. Since stock prices fluctuate rapidly, an individual's true wealth and ranking at the time of publication may vary from their situation when the list was compiled.

When a living individual has dispersed their wealth to immediate family members it is included under a single listing (as a single "family fortune") provided that individual (the grantor) is still living. However, if a deceased billionaire's fortune has been dispersed, it will not appear as a single listing, and each recipient will only appear if their own total net worth is over a $1 billion (their net worth will not be combined with family members'). Royal families and dictators that have their wealth contingent on a position are always excluded from these lists.

== Annual rankings ==
The rankings are published annually in March, so the net worths listed are snapshots taken at that time. There are thousands of billionaires on the Forbes list; the excerpts below show only the wealthiest 10 for each year.

Legend

Icon	Description
Steady	Has not changed from the previous ranking.
▲	Has increased from the previous ranking.
▼	Has decreased from the previous ranking.

=== 1987–1989 ===
No.	Name	Net worth (USD)	Nationality	Source(s) of wealth
1	Yoshiaki Tsutsumi	$20 billion	Japan	Seibu Corporation
2	Taikichiro Mori	$15 billion	Japan	Mori Building Company
3	Sam Walton	$7.5 billion	United States	Walmart
4	Shigeru Kobayashi	$7.0 billion	Japan	Real estate
5	Haruiko Yoshimoto	$6.2 billion	Japan	Real estate
6	Salim Ahmed bin Mahfouz	$6.0 billion	Saudi Arabia	National Commercial Bank
7	Hans Rausing	$6.0 billion	Sweden	Tetra Pak
8	Paul Reichmann	$5.6 billion	Canada	Real estate
9	Yohachiro Iwasaki	$5.6 billion	Japan	Logging and real estate
10	Kenji Osana	$5.5 Billion	Japan	Transportation and hotels

=== 1990 ===
No.	Name	Net worth (USD)	Nationality	Source(s) of wealth
1	Yoshiaki Tsutsumi	$16.0 billion ▲	Japan	Seibu Corporation
2	Taikichiro Mori	$14.6 billion ▲	Japan	Mori Building Company
3	Walton family	$13.5 billion ▲	United States	Wal-Mart
4 ▲	du Pont family	$10.0 billion ▲	United States	DuPont
5 ▲	Hans and Gad Rausing	$9.6 billion ▲	Sweden	Tetra Pak
6 ▲	Kitaro Watanabe	$9.2 billion ▲	Japan	Azabu Building
7 ▼	Paul Reichmann & brothers	$9.0 billion ▲	Canada	Olympia & York
8 ▲	Kenkichi Nakajima	$8.4 billion ▲	Japan	Heiwa Corporation
9 ▼	Shin Kyuk-ho	$7.5 billion ▼	South Korea	Lotte Corporation
10	Eitaro Itoyama	$5.8 billion ▼	Japan	Shin Nihon Kanko

=== 1991 ===
No.	Name	Net worth (USD)	Nationality	Source(s) of wealth
1 ▲	Walton family	$18.5 billion ▲	United States	Wal-Mart
2	Taikichiro Mori	$15.0 billion ▲	Japan	Mori Building Company
3 ▼	Yoshiaki Tsutsumi	$14.0 billion ▼	Japan	Seibu Corporation
4	du Pont family	$10.0 billion	United States	DuPont
5	Hans and Gad Rausing	$9.0 billion ▼	Sweden	Tetra Pak
6	Kitaro Watanabe	$7.7 billion ▼	Japan	Azabu Building
7	Paul Reichmann & brothers	$7.1 billion ▼	Canada	Olympia & York
8 ▲	Kenneth Thomson	$6.8 billion ▲	Canada	Thomson Corporation
9 ▼	Kenkichi Nakajima	$6.1 billion ▼	Japan	Heiwa Corporation
10 ▼	Shin Kyuk-ho	$6.0 billion ▼	South Korea	Lotte Corporation

=== 1992 ===
No.	Name	Net worth (USD)	Nationality	Source(s) of wealth
1	Walton family	$23.8 billion ▲	United States	Wal-Mart
2	Taikichiro Mori	$13.0 billion ▼	Japan	Mori Building Company
3	Yoshiaki Tsutsumi	$10.0 billion ▼	Japan	Seibu Corporation
4 ▲	Hans and Gad Rausing	$7.0 billion ▲	Sweden	Tetra Pak
5 ▲	Erivan Haub	$6.9 billion ▲	Germany	Tengelmann Group
6 ▲	Haniel family	$6.4 billion ▲	Germany	Franz Haniel & Cie.
7 ▲	Bill Gates	$6.4 billion ▲	United States	Microsoft
8 ▲	David Sainsbury & family	$6.2 billion ▲	United Kingdom	Sainsbury's
9 ▼	Kenneth Thomson	$6.2 billion ▼	Canada	Thomson Corporation
10	Shin Kyuk-ho	$6.0 billion	South Korea	Lotte Corporation

=== 1993 ===
No.	Name	Net worth (USD)	Nationality	Source(s) of wealth
1	Walton family	$25.3 billion ▲	United States	Wal-Mart
2 ▲	Mars family	$9.2 billion ▲	United States	Mars, Inc.
3	Yoshiaki Tsutsumi	$9.0 billion ▼	Japan	Seibu Corporation
4 ▲	du Pont family	$8.6 billion ▲	United States	DuPont
5 ▲	Minoru and Akira Mori	$7.5 billion ▲	Japan	Mori Building Company
6 ▲	Bill Gates	$7.4 billion ▲	United States	Microsoft
7 ▲	Samuel and Donald Newhouse	$7.0 billion ▲	United States	Advance Publications
8 ▲	Sid and Lee Bass & brothers	$6.8 billion ▲	United States	Richardson Gasoline
9 ▲	Warren Buffett	$6.6 billion ▲	United States	Berkshire Hathaway
10 ▼	Erivan Haub	$6.2 billion ▼	Germany	Tengelmann Group

=== 1994 ===
No.	Name	Net worth (USD)	Nationality	Source(s) of wealth
1	Walton family	$22.6 billion ▼	United States	Wal-Mart
2 ▲	du Pont family	$9.0 billion ▲	United States	DuPont
3 ▲	Hans and Gad Rausing	$9.0 billion ▲	Sweden	Tetra Pak
4 ▼	Yoshiaki Tsutsumi	$8.5 billion ▼	Japan	Seibu Corporation
5 ▲	Bill Gates	$8.2 billion ▲	United States	Microsoft
6 ▲	Warren Buffett	$7.9 billion ▲	United States	Berkshire Hathaway
7 ▲	Paul Sacher & Hoffman family	$7.8 billion ▲	Switzerland	Hoffmann-La Roche
8 ▲	Tsai Wan-lin & family	$7.5 billion ▲	Taiwan	Lin Yuan Group
9 ▲	Karl and Theo Albrecht	$7.3 billion ▲	Germany	Aldi
10 ▲	Carlos Slim	$6.6 billion ▲	Mexico	América Móvil, Grupo Carso

=== 1995 ===
No.	Name	Net worth (USD)	Nationality	Source(s) of wealth
1	Walton family	$23.5 billion ▲	United States	Wal-Mart
2 ▲	Bill Gates	$12.9 billion ▲	United States	Microsoft
3 ▲	Warren Buffett	$10.7 billion ▲	United States	Berkshire Hathaway
4 ▼	Hans and Gad Rausing	$9.0 billion	Sweden	Tetra Pak
5 ▼	Yoshiaki Tsutsumi	$9.0 billion ▲	Japan	Seibu Corporation
6 ▲	Paul Sacher & Hoffman family	$8.6 billion ▲	Switzerland	Hoffmann-La Roche
7 ▲	Tsai Wan-lin & family	$8.5 billion ▲	Taiwan	Lin Yuan Group
8 ▲	Kenneth Thomson	$6.5 billion ▲	Canada	Thomson Corporation
9 ▲	Lee Shau-kee	$6.5 billion	Hong Kong	Henderson Land Development
10 ▲	Chung Ju-yung	$6.2 billion	South Korea	Hyundai

=== 1996 ===
No.	Name	Net worth (USD)	Age	Nationality	Source(s) of wealth
1	Walton family	$22.9 billion ▼	_	United States	Wal-Mart
2	Bill Gates	$18.0 billion ▲	41	United States	Microsoft
3	Warren Buffett	$15.3 billion ▲	65	United States	Berkshire Hathaway
4 ▲	Oeri, Hoffman & Sacher families	$13.1 billion ▲	_	Switzerland	Roche
5 ▲	Lee Shau-kee	$12.7 billion ▲	68	Hong Kong	Henderson Land Development
6 ▲	Tsai Wan-lin & family	$12.2 billion ▲	72	Taiwan	Cathay Life Insurance
7 ▲	Kwok brothers	$11.2 billion ▲	_	Hong Kong	Sun Hung Kai Properties
8 ▲	Li Ka-shing & family	$10.6 billion ▲	68	Hong Kong	CK Asset Holdings
9 ▼	Yoshiaki Tsutsumi	$9.2 billion ▲	62	Japan	Seibu Railway
10 ▲	Karl and Theo Albrecht	$9.0 billion ▲	76	Germany	Aldi

=== 1997 ===
No.	Name	Net worth (USD)	Age	Nationality	Source(s) of wealth
1 ▲	Bill Gates	$36.4 billion ▲	42	United States	Microsoft
2 ▼	Walton family	$27.6 billion ▲	_	United States	Wal-Mart
3	Warren Buffett	$23.2 billion ▲	66	United States	Berkshire Hathaway
4 ▲	Lee Shau-kee	$14.7 billion ▲	69	Hong Kong	Henderson Land Development
5 ▲	Paul Allen	$14.1 billion ▲	44	United States	Microsoft
6 ▲	Kwok brothers	$12.3 billion ▲	48	Hong Kong	Sun Hung Kai Properties
7 ▲	Haas family	$12.3 billion ▲	_	United States	Levi Strauss & Co
8 ▲	Forrest Mars Sr. & family	$12.0 billion ▲	93	United States	Mars, Inc.
9 ▲	Karl and Theo Albrecht	$11.5 billion ▲	77	Germany	Aldi
10 ▼	Tsai Wan-lin & family	$11.3 billion ▼	73	Taiwan	Cathay Life Insurance

=== 1998 ===
No.	Name	Net worth (USD)	Age	Nationality	Source(s) of wealth
1	Bill Gates	$51.0 billion ▲	43	United States	Microsoft
2	Walton family	$48.0 billion ▲	_	United States	Wal-Mart
3	Warren Buffett	$33.0 billion ▲	67	United States	Berkshire Hathaway
4 ▲	Paul Allen	$21.0 billion ▲	45	United States	Microsoft
5 ▲	Kenneth Thomson	$14.4 billion ▲	74	Canada	Woodbridge Co. Ltd.
6 ▲	Jay and Robert Pritzker	$13.5 billion ▲	_	United States	Hyatt
7 ▲	Forrest Mars Sr. & family	$13.5 billion ▲	94	United States	Mars, Inc.
8 ▲	Al-Waleed Bin Talal	$13.3 billion ▲	41	Saudi Arabia	Kingdom Holding Company
9 ▼	Lee Shau-kee	$12.7 billion ▼	70	Hong Kong	Henderson Land Development
10 ▼	Karl and Theo Albrecht	$11.7 billion ▲	78	Germany	Aldi

=== 1999 ===
No.	Name	Net worth (USD)	Age	Nationality	Source(s) of wealth
1	Bill Gates	$90.0 billion ▲	43	United States	Microsoft
2 ▲	Warren Buffett	$36.0 billion ▲	68	United States	Berkshire Hathaway
3 ▲	Paul Allen	$30.0 billion ▲	46	United States	Microsoft
4 ▲	Steven Ballmer	$19.5 billion ▲	43	United States	Microsoft
5 ▲	Philip Anschutz	$16.5 billion ▲	59	United States	The Anschutz Corporation
6 ▲	Michael Dell	$16.5 billion ▲	34	United States	Dell
7 ▲	S. Robson Walton	$15.8 billion	55	United States	Wal-Mart
8	Al-Waleed Bin Talal	$15.0 billion ▲	42	Saudi Arabia	Kingdom Holding Company
9 ▲	Karl and Theo Albrecht	$13.6 billion ▲	79	Germany	Aldi
10 ▲	Li Ka-shing & family	$12.6 billion ▲	71	Hong Kong	CK Asset Holdings

=== 2000 ===
Gates became the first American to take the top spot of the world's billionaires in 1995 with a net worth of $12.5 billion, and he remained there during the dot-com bubble's height in 1999 when his fortune peaked at $90 billion. After the dot-com bubble started to collapse in 2000, his wealth dropped to $60 billion, although he remained at the top of the list.

No.	Name	Net worth (USD)	Age	Nationality	Source(s) of wealth
1	Bill Gates	$60.0 billion ▼	44	United States	Microsoft
2 ▲	Larry Ellison	$47.0 billion ▲	55	United States	Oracle Corporation
3	Paul Allen	$28.0 billion ▼	47	United States	Microsoft
4 ▼	Warren Buffett	$25.6 billion ▼	69	United States	Berkshire Hathaway
5 ▲	Karl and Theo Albrecht	$20.0 billion ▲	80	Germany	Aldi
6 ▲	Al-Waleed bin Talal	$20.0 billion ▲	43	Saudi Arabia	Kingdom Holding Company
7	S. Robson Walton	$20.0 billion ▲	57	United States	Wal-Mart
8 ▲	Masayoshi Son	$19.4 billion ▲	43	Japan	Softbank Capital, SoftBank Mobile
9 ▼	Michael Dell	$19.1 billion ▲	35	United States	Dell
10 ▲	Kenneth Thomson	$16.1 billion ▲	77	Canada	The Thomson Corporation

=== 2001 ===
In 2001, BET founder Robert L. Johnson became the first ever African-American billionaire.

No.	Name	Net worth (USD)	Age	Nationality	Source(s) of wealth
1	Bill Gates	$58.7 billion ▼	45	United States	Microsoft
2 ▲	Warren Buffett	$32.3 billion ▲	70	United States	Berkshire Hathaway
3	Paul Allen	$30.4 billion ▲	48	United States	Microsoft
4 ▼	Larry Ellison	$26.0 billion ▼	56	United States	Oracle Corporation
5	Karl and Theo Albrecht	$25.0 billion ▲	81	Germany	Aldi
6	Al-Waleed bin Talal	$20.0 billion	44	Saudi Arabia	Kingdom Holding Company
7 ▲	Jim Walton*	$18.8 billion ▲	53	United States	Wal-Mart
8 ▲	John Walton*	$18.7 billion ▲	55	United States	Wal-Mart
9 ▲	S. Robson Walton*	$18.6 billion ▲	57	United States	Wal-Mart
10 ▲	Alice Walton*	$18.5 billion ▲	52	United States	Wal-Mart
10 ▲	Helen Walton*	$18.5 billion ▲	81	United States	Wal-Mart

* Each hold an essentially equal share in Wal-Mart. Had he been alive in 2001, Sam Walton would have been the world's wealthiest person.

=== 2002 ===
As a result of the market crash caused by the dot-com bubble, 83 billionaires dropped off the list from the previous year.

No.	Name	Net worth (USD)	Age	Nationality	Source(s) of wealth
1	Bill Gates	$52.8 billion ▼	46	United States	Microsoft
2	Warren Buffett	$35.0 billion ▲	71	United States	Berkshire Hathaway
3 ▲	Karl and Theo Albrecht	$26.8 billion ▲	82	Germany	Aldi
4 ▼	Paul Allen	$25.2 billion ▼	49	United States	Microsoft
5 ▼	Larry Ellison	$23.5 billion ▼	57	United States	Oracle Corporation
6 ▲	Jim Walton*	$20.8 billion ▲	54	United States	Wal-Mart
7 ▲	John Walton*	$20.7 billion ▲	56	United States	Wal-Mart
8 ▲	Alice Walton*	$20.5 billion ▲	53	United States	Wal-Mart
8 ▲	S. Robson Walton*	$20.5 billion ▲	58	United States	Wal-Mart
8 ▲	Helen Walton*	$20.5 billion ▲	82	United States	Wal-Mart

* Each hold an essentially equal share in Walmart.

=== 2003 ===
Oprah Winfrey became the first female African-American billionaire.

No.	Name	Net worth (USD)	Age	Nationality	Source(s) of wealth
1	Bill Gates	$40.7 billion ▼	47	United States	Microsoft
2	Warren Buffett	$30.5 billion ▼	72	United States	Berkshire Hathaway
3	Karl and Theo Albrecht	$25.6 billion ▼	83	Germany	Aldi
4	Paul Allen	$20.1 billion ▼	50	United States	Microsoft
5 ▲	Al-Waleed bin Talal	$17.7 billion ▼	46	Saudi Arabia	Kingdom Holding Company
6 ▼	Larry Ellison	$16.6 billion ▼	58	United States	Oracle Corporation
7 ▼	Alice Walton*	$16.5 billion ▼	54	United States	Wal-Mart
7 ▼	Helen Walton*	$16.5 billion ▼	83	United States	Wal-Mart
7 ▼	Jim Walton*	$16.5 billion ▼	55	United States	Wal-Mart
7 ▼	John Walton*	$16.5 billion ▼	57	United States	Wal-Mart
7 ▼	S. Robson Walton*	$16.5 billion ▼	59	United States	Wal-Mart

* Each hold an essentially equal share in Walmart.

=== 2004 ===
The founders of Google, Sergey Brin and Larry Page, became billionaires at age 30.

No.	Name	Net worth (USD)	Age	Nationality	Source(s) of wealth
1	Bill Gates	$46.6 billion ▲	48	United States	Microsoft
2	Warren Buffett	$42.9 billion ▲	73	United States	Berkshire Hathaway
3	Karl Albrecht	$23.0 billion ▲	84	Germany	Aldi Süd
4 ▲	Al-Waleed bin Talal	$21.5 billion ▲	47	Saudi Arabia	Kingdom Holding Company
5 ▼	Paul Allen	$21.0 billion ▲	51	United States	Microsoft
6 ▲	Alice Walton*	$20.0 billion ▲	55	United States	Wal-Mart
6 ▲	Helen Walton*	$20.0 billion ▲	84	United States	Wal-Mart
6 ▲	Jim Walton*	$20.0 billion ▲	56	United States	Wal-Mart
6 ▲	John Walton*	$20.0 billion ▲	58	United States	Wal-Mart
6 ▲	S. Robson Walton*	$20.0 billion ▲	60	United States	Wal-Mart

* Each hold an essentially equal share in Walmart.

=== 2005 ===
The net worth of 2005's 691 billionaires was $2.2 trillion. More than half of them had self-made fortunes.

No.	Name	Net worth (USD)	Age	Nationality	Source(s) of wealth
1	Bill Gates	$46.5 billion ▼	49	United States	Microsoft
2	Warren Buffett	$44.0 billion ▲	74	United States	Berkshire Hathaway
3 ▲	Lakshmi Mittal	$25.0 billion ▲	54	India	Mittal Steel Company
4 ▲	Carlos Slim	$23.8 billion ▲	65	Mexico	América Móvil, Grupo Carso
5 ▼	Al-Waleed bin Talal	$23.7 billion ▲	49	Saudi Arabia	Kingdom Holding Company
6 ▲	Ingvar Kamprad	$23.0 billion ▲	79	Sweden	IKEA
7 ▼	Paul Allen	$21.0 billion	52	United States	Microsoft
8 ▼	Karl Albrecht	$18.5 billion ▼	85	Germany	Aldi Süd
9 ▲	Larry Ellison	$18.4 billion ▼	60	United States	Oracle Corporation
10	S. Robson Walton	$18.3 billion ▼	61	United States	Walmart

=== 2006 ===
Free cash used by consumers from home equity extraction, known as the real estate bubble, created a total of nearly $5 trillion in 2005, contributing to economic growth worldwide.

No.	Name	Net worth (USD)	Age	Nationality	Source(s) of wealth
1	Bill Gates	$52.0 billion ▲	50	United States	Microsoft
2	Warren Buffett	$42.0 billion ▼	75	United States	Berkshire Hathaway
3 ▲	Carlos Slim	$30.0 billion ▲	66	Mexico	América Móvil, Grupo Carso
4 ▲	Ingvar Kamprad	$28.0 billion ▲	79	Sweden	IKEA
5 ▼	Lakshmi Mittal	$23.5 billion ▼	55	India	Mittal Steel Company
6 ▲	Paul Allen	$22.0 billion ▲	53	United States	Microsoft
7 ▲	Bernard Arnault	$21.5 billion ▲	57	France	LVMH Moët Hennessy • Louis Vuitton
8 ▼	Al-Waleed bin Talal	$20.0 billion ▼	49	Saudi Arabia	Kingdom Holding Company
9 ▲	Kenneth Thomson	$19.6 billion ▲	82	Canada	Thomson Corporation
10 ▲	Li Ka-shing	$18.8 billion ▲	77	Hong Kong	Cheung Kong Group, Hutchison Whampoa

=== 2007 ===
Forbes recorded a then record of 946 billionaires. There were 178 newcomers, as well as the first billionaires from Cyprus, Oman, Romania and Serbia. Over 66% of the previous year's billionaires became richer. The billionaires' net worth increased in 2007 by $900 billion to $3.5 trillion.

No.	Name	Net worth (USD)	Age	Nationality	Source(s) of wealth
1	Bill Gates	$56.0 billion ▲	51	United States	Microsoft
2	Warren Buffett	$52.0 billion ▲	76	United States	Berkshire Hathaway
3	Carlos Slim	$49.0 billion ▲	67	Mexico	América Móvil, Grupo Carso
4	Ingvar Kamprad	$33.0 billion ▲	80	Sweden	IKEA
5	Lakshmi Mittal	$32.0 billion ▲	56	India	Arcelor Mittal
6 ▲	Sheldon Adelson	$26.5 billion ▲	73	United States	Las Vegas Sands
7	Bernard Arnault	$26.0 billion ▲	58	France	LVMH
8 ▲	Amancio Ortega	$24.0 billion ▲	71	Spain	Inditex Group
9 ▲	Li Ka-shing	$23.0 billion ▲	78	Hong Kong	Cheung Kong Holdings, Hutchison Whampoa
10 ▲	David Thomson	$22.0 billion ▲	49	Canada	Thomson Corporation

=== 2008 ===
Facebook founder Mark Zuckerberg, four years after starting the company, joined the list at 23 to become the youngest self-made billionaire.

No.	Name	Net worth (USD)	Age	Nationality	Source(s) of wealth
1 ▲	Warren Buffett	$62.0 billion ▲	77	United States	Berkshire Hathaway
2 ▲	Carlos Slim	$60.0 billion ▲	68	Mexico	América Móvil, Grupo Carso
3 ▼	Bill Gates	$58.0 billion ▲	52	United States	Microsoft
4 ▲	Lakshmi Mittal	$45.0 billion ▲	57	India	Arcelor Mittal
5 ▲	Mukesh Ambani	$43.0 billion ▲	51	India	Reliance Industries
6 ▲	Anil Ambani	$42.0 billion ▲	48	India	Anil Dhirubhai Ambani Group
7 ▼	Ingvar Kamprad	$31.0 billion ▼	81	Sweden	IKEA
8 ▲	Kushal Pal Singh	$30.0 billion ▲	76	India	DLF Group
9 ▲	Oleg Deripaska	$28.0 billion ▲	40	Russia	Rusal
10 ▲	Karl Albrecht	$27.0 billion ▲	88	Germany	Aldi Süd

=== 2009 ===
During the Great Recession, the world's billionaires lost $2 trillion in net worth and the list became 30% smaller than the previous year's list.

No.	Name	Net worth (USD)	Age	Nationality	Source(s) of wealth
1 ▲	Bill Gates	$40.0 billion ▼	53	United States	Microsoft
2 ▼	Warren Buffett	$37.0 billion ▼	78	United States	Berkshire Hathaway
3 ▼	Carlos Slim	$35.0 billion ▼	69	Mexico	América Móvil, Grupo Carso
4 ▲	Larry Ellison	$22.5 billion ▼	64	United States	Oracle Corporation
5 ▲	Ingvar Kamprad	$22.0 billion ▼	83	Sweden	IKEA
6 ▲	Karl Albrecht	$21.5 billion ▼	89	Germany	Aldi Süd
7 ▼	Mukesh Ambani	$19.5 billion ▼	52	India	Reliance Industries
8 ▼	Lakshmi Mittal	$19.3 billion ▼	58	India	Arcelor Mittal
9 ▲	Theo Albrecht	$18.8 billion ▼	87	Germany	Aldi Nord, Trader Joe's
10 ▲	Amancio Ortega	$18.3 billion ▼	73	Spain	Inditex Group

=== 2010 ===
Slim narrowly eclipsed Gates to top the billionaire list for the first time. Slim saw his estimated worth surge $18.5 billion to $53.5 billion as shares of America Movil rose 35 percent. Gates' estimated wealth rose $13 billion to $53 billion, placing him second. Warren Buffett was third with $47 billion. Christy Walton was the highest-ranking woman, placing 12th overall, with an inherited fortune of $22.5 billion. At age 25, Mark Zuckerberg continued to be the world's youngest self-made billionaire. American Isaac Perlmutter was among the newcomers with an estimated fortune of $4 billion largely acquired in his sale of Marvel Entertainment to Disney.

A total of 1,011 people made the 2010 list. The United States accounted for 403 billionaires, followed by China with 89 and Russia with 62. It was the first time China, while including Hong Kong, placed second. A total of 55 countries were represented on the 2010 list, including Finland and Pakistan which claimed their first billionaires. Eighty-nine women made the list, but only 14 of them were self-made. The combined net worth of the list was $3.6 trillion, up 50 percent from 2009's $2.4 trillion, while the average net worth was $3.5 billion.

The 2010 list featured 164 re-entries and 97 true newcomers. Asia accounted for more than 100 of the new entrants. Overall, just 12 percent of the list lost wealth since 2009, and 30 people fell off the list. 13 others died. Of the 89 women, 12 were newcomers in 2010. Steve Forbes said the growing number of billionaires was a clear sign that the world's economy was recovering from the Great Recession.

In June 2010, Gates and Buffett announced the Giving Pledge, a promise to give the majority of their wealth to philanthropic causes. As of 2017, the pledge had 158 signatories, but some of the signatories have since died. Most of the signers of the pledge are billionaires, and their pledges total over $365 billion.

No.	Name	Net worth (USD)	Age	Nationality	Source(s) of wealth
1 ▲	Carlos Slim & family	$53.5 billion ▲	70	Mexico	América Móvil, Grupo Carso
2 ▼	Bill Gates	$53.0 billion ▲	54	United States	Microsoft
3 ▼	Warren Buffett	$47.0 billion ▲	79	United States	Berkshire Hathaway
4 ▲	Mukesh Ambani	$29.0 billion ▲	53	India	Reliance Industries
5 ▲	Lakshmi Mittal	$28.7 billion ▲	60	India	Arcelor Mittal
6 ▼	Larry Ellison	$28.0 billion ▲	66	United States	Oracle Corporation
7 ▲	Bernard Arnault	$27.5 billion ▲	61	France	LVMH Moët Hennessy • Louis Vuitton
8 ▲	Eike Batista	$27.0 billion ▲	53	Brazil	EBX Group
9 ▲	Amancio Ortega	$25.0 billion ▲	74	Spain	Inditex Group
10 ▼	Karl Albrecht	$23.5 billion ▲	90	Germany	Aldi Süd

=== 2011 ===
In the 25th annual Forbes list of global billionaires, Slim added $20.5 billion to his fortune, the most of anyone, and retained his number one ranking with a total fortune of $74 billion. Gates remained in second place with $56 billion, while Warren Buffett was third with $50 billion. The top 10 had a combined wealth of $406 billion, up from $342 billion in 2010. According to Forbes editor Kerry Dolan, "media and technology billionaires definitely benefited from a stronger stock market and a growing enthusiasm for all things social" since the 2010 list. However, Nigerian commodity mogul Aliko Dangote was the greatest gainer on a percentage basis as his fortune increased 557 percent to $13.5 billion. Mark Zuckerberg was one of seven Facebook-related billionaires on the list, as he added $9.5 billion to his net worth to move up to 52nd. Facebook co-founder Dustin Moskovitz was the youngest person on the list. Aged 26, eight days younger than Zuckerberg, he debuted at number 420 with an estimated fortune of $2.7 billion. IKEA founder Ingvar Kamprad was the largest loser as he saw his fortune plummet from $23 billion to $6 billion, dropping him from 11th to 162nd overall.

A record 1,210 billionaires made the 2011 list, representing a combined wealth of $4.5 trillion, up from $3.6 trillion the previous year. One third of the world's billionaires, 413, came from the United States. China had the second most billionaires with 115, while Russia was third with 101. Asia moved up to 332 billionaires, passing Europe as a region for the first time since the 1990s. The 2011 list included 214 newcomers and the average net worth of those on it increased to $3.7 billion.

No.	Name	Net worth (USD)	Age	Nationality	Source(s) of wealth
1	Carlos Slim	$74.0 billion ▲	71	Mexico	América Móvil, Grupo Carso
2	Bill Gates	$56.0 billion ▲	55	United States	Microsoft
3	Warren Buffett	$50.0 billion ▲	80	United States	Berkshire Hathaway
4 ▲	Bernard Arnault	$41.0 billion ▲	62	France	LVMH Moët Hennessy • Louis Vuitton
5 ▲	Larry Ellison	$39.5 billion ▲	66	United States	Oracle Corporation
6 ▼	Lakshmi Mittal	$31.1 billion ▲	60	India	Arcelor Mittal
7 ▲	Amancio Ortega	$31.0 billion ▲	74	Spain	Inditex Group
8	Eike Batista	$30.0 billion ▲	53	Brazil	EBX Group
9 ▼	Mukesh Ambani	$27.0 billion ▼	54	India	Reliance Industries
10 ▲	Christy Walton & family	$26.5 billion ▲	62	United States	Walmart

=== 2012 ===
Carlos Slim topped the 2012 list, marking this third consecutive year at the top. Gates placed second but narrowed the gap from 2011 as Slim's fortune fell $5 billion while Gates' rose $5 billion. Warren Buffett remained in third place. Bernard Arnault of France was the top-ranking European on the list, placing fourth. Ricardo Salinas Pliego was the greatest gainer in terms of dollars, adding $9.2 billion to his fortune and moving up to number 37 overall. Making her debut on the list at age 41, Spanx founder Sara Blakely became the youngest self-made female billionaire ever. Colombia's Alejandro Santo Domingo was the highest-ranked newcomer, inheriting a $9.5 billion stake in Santo Domingo Group from his father. India's Lakshmi Mittal was the largest loser as his fortune dropped from $31.1 billion to $20.7 billion as the price of steelmaker ArcelorMittal fell sharply. As a result, he failed to make the top 10 for the first time since 2004 and lost his title of richest Asian to Hong Kong's Li Ka-shing.

A record total of 1,226 people made the 2012 list, representing 58 countries. Of those, 126 were newcomers to the list and 104 were women. The United States had the greatest number of billionaires with 425. Russia had 96 people on the list, while China had 95. Georgia, Morocco, and Peru were newly represented on the list. Falling stock prices in Asia contributed to 117 former billionaires falling from the list worldwide. Twelve others listed in 2011 died. Overall, net gainers (460) barely outnumbered net losers (441).

To coincide with the release of the 2012 list, Forbes announced a then-new "Billionaire Real-Time Ticker" updating the wealth of the world's top 50 billionaires in real time.

No.	Name	Net worth (USD)	Age	Nationality	Source(s) of wealth
1	Carlos Slim & family	$69.0 billion ▼	72	Mexico	América Móvil, Grupo Carso
2	Bill Gates	$61.0 billion ▲	56	United States	Microsoft
3	Warren Buffett	$44.0 billion ▼	81	United States	Berkshire Hathaway
4	Bernard Arnault	$41.0 billion ▲	63	France	LVMH Moët Hennessy • Louis Vuitton
5 ▲	Amancio Ortega	$37.5 billion ▲	75	Spain	Inditex Group
6 ▼	Larry Ellison	$36.0 billion ▲	67	United States	Oracle Corporation
7 ▲	Eike Batista	$30.0 billion ▲	55	Brazil	EBX Group
8 ▲	Stefan Persson	$26.0 billion ▲	64	Sweden	H&M
9 ▲	Li Ka-shing	$25.5 billion ▲	83	Hong Kong	Cheung Kong Holdings
10 ▲	Karl Albrecht	$25.4 billion ▲	92	Germany	Aldi

=== 2013 ===
Carlos Slim topped the 2013 billionaire list, marking his fourth consecutive year at the top. Gates remained in second, while Amancio Ortega moved up to third. Ortega's gain of $19.5 billion was the largest of anyone on the list. Warren Buffett failed to make the top three for the first time since 2000, placing fourth. Diesel founder Renzo Rosso was among the top newcomers, debuting with an estimate net worth of $3 billion.

A global rise in asset prices led Forbes editor Randall Lane to declare "It [was] a very good year to be a billionaire". However, it was not a good year to be Eike Batista, who fell from seventh to 100th, suffering the largest net loss of anyone on the list. Overall, net gainers outnumbered net losers by 4:1.

A record total of 1,426 people made the 2013 list, representing $5.4 trillion of assets. Of those, 442 billionaires hailed from the United States. The Asian-Pacific region had 386 billionaires and Europe 366. The list also featured a record number of newcomers, 210, representing 42 countries. 60 people from the 2012 list fell below a billion dollars of assets in 2013, and eight others from the 2012 list died. The Asia-Pacific region had the most drop-offs, with 29, followed by the United States with 16. The 2013 list featured 138 women, of which 50 came from the United States. A majority of the list (961 individuals, 67 percent) were entirely self-made; 184 (13 percent) inherited their wealth, and 281 (20 percent) achieved their fortune through a combination of inheritance and business acumen. Vietnam's Phạm Nhật Vượng was the first person from that country to be included in this list.

No.	Name	Net worth (USD)	Age	Nationality	Source(s) of wealth
1	Carlos Slim & family	$73.0 billion ▲	73	Mexico	América Móvil, Grupo Carso
2	Bill Gates	$67.0 billion ▲	57	United States	Microsoft
3 ▲	Amancio Ortega	$57.0 billion ▲	76	Spain	Inditex Group
4 ▼	Warren Buffett	$53.5 billion ▲	82	United States	Berkshire Hathaway
5 ▲	Larry Ellison	$43.0 billion ▲	68	United States	Oracle Corporation
6 ▲	Charles Koch	$34.0 billion ▲	77	United States	Koch Industries
6 ▲	David Koch	$34.0 billion ▲	72	United States	Koch Industries
8 ▲	Li Ka-shing	$31.0 billion ▲	84	Hong Kong	Cheung Kong Holdings
9 ▲	Liliane Bettencourt & family	$30.0 billion ▲	90	France	L'Oréal
10 ▼	Bernard Arnault	$29.0 billion ▼	63	France	LVMH

=== 2014 ===
Gates added $9 billion to his fortune since 2013 and topped the Forbes 2014 billionaire list. He had topped the list in 15 of the previous 20 years, but his previous number one ranking was in 2009. Mexican telecommunication mogul Carlos Slim came in second place after being number one the previous four years. Zara founder Amancio Ortega placed third for the second consecutive year. American investor Warren Buffett was in the top five for the 20th consecutive year, placing fourth. America's Christy Walton was the highest ranking woman, placing ninth overall. Aliko Dangote of Nigeria became the first African to enter the top 25, with an estimated net worth of $25 billion.

A total of 1,645 people made the 2014 billionaire list, representing a combined wealth of $6.4 trillion. Of those, a record 268 were newcomers, surpassing 2008's 226 newcomers. 100 people listed in 2013 failed to make the list. The number of women on the list rose to a record 172 in 2014. Approximately 66 percent of the list were self-made, 13 percent achieved their wealth through inheritance alone, and 21 percent through a mixture of the two.

The United States had 492 billionaires on the list, the most of any country. It also had the most newcomers with 50, and women with 54. China had the second most billionaires with 152, while Russia was third with 111. Algeria, Lithuania, Tanzania, and Uganda were all represented on the list for the first time. Turkey saw the most people drop off the list, 19, due to a period of high inflation in the country.

No.	Name	Net worth (USD)	Age	Nationality	Source(s) of wealth
1 ▲	Bill Gates	$76.0 billion ▲	58	United States	Microsoft
2 ▼	Carlos Slim & family	$72.0 billion ▼	74	Mexico	América Móvil, Grupo Carso
3	Amancio Ortega	$64.0 billion ▲	77	Spain	Inditex
4	Warren Buffett	$58.2 billion ▲	83	United States	Berkshire Hathaway
5	Larry Ellison	$48.0 billion ▲	70	United States	Oracle Corporation
6	Charles Koch	$40.0 billion ▲	78	United States	Koch Industries
6	David Koch	$40.0 billion ▲	73	United States	Koch Industries
8 ▲	Sheldon Adelson	$38.0 billion ▲	80	United States	Las Vegas Sands
9 ▲	Christy Walton & family	$36.7 billion ▲	65	United States	Walmart
10 ▲	Jim Walton	$34.7 billion ▲	65	United States	Walmart

=== 2015 ===
In the 29th annual Forbes list of global billionaires, a record 1,826 billionaires were named with an aggregated net worth of $7.1 trillion compared to $6.4 trillion in the previous year. 46 of the billionaires in this list were under the age of 40. A record number of 290 people joined the list for the first time, of whom 25 percent hailed from China, which produced a world-leading 71 newcomers. The United States came in second, with 57; followed by India, with 28; and Germany, with 23. The United States had the largest number of billionaires with 526. Russia went down to 88 from 111 in 2014. Russia was placed behind China, Germany and India by the number of billionaires. Self-made billionaires made up the largest number of people on the list with 1,191 positions (over 65 percent), while just 230 (under 13 percent) had wealth through inheritance. The number of billionaires who inherited a portion but were still working to increase their fortunes is 405.

Bill Gates was named the richest man in the world by Forbes' annual list of the world's billionaires. This was the 16th time that the founder of Microsoft claimed the top spot. Carlos Slim came in second for the second consecutive time. Warren Buffett of Berkshire Hathaway placed third, while Amancio Ortega of Spain, slipped down a position from the previous year to number four. Larry Ellison, the founder of Oracle, rounded off the top five. Christy Walton was the highest-ranking female at number eight. America's Evan Spiegel, co-founder of photo messaging app Snapchat, became the youngest billionaire this year at age 24. At age 99, David Rockefeller maintained his position as the oldest billionaire included in the list. Mark Zuckerberg, the founder of Facebook, rose to number 16 with $33.4 billion. Iceland had a billionaire, Thor Bjorgolfsson, in the list after a gap of five years. Guatemala had a billionaire, Mario Lopez Estrada, for the first time in its history.

No.	Name	Net worth (USD)	Age	Nationality	Source(s) of wealth
1	Bill Gates	$79.2 billion ▲	59	United States	Microsoft
2	Carlos Slim	$77.1 billion ▲	75	Mexico	América Móvil, Grupo Carso
3 ▲	Warren Buffett	$72.7 billion ▲	84	United States	Berkshire Hathaway
4 ▼	Amancio Ortega	$64.5 billion ▲	78	Spain	Inditex
5	Larry Ellison	$54.3 billion ▲	70	United States	Oracle Corporation
6	Charles Koch	$42.9 billion ▲	79	United States	Koch Industries
6	David Koch	$42.9 billion ▲	74	United States	Koch Industries
8 ▲	Christy Walton	$41.7 billion ▲	66	United States	Walmart
9 ▲	Jim Walton	$40.6 billion ▲	66	United States	Walmart
10 ▲	Liliane Bettencourt	$40.1 billion ▲	92	France	L'Oreal

=== 2016 ===
For the third year in a row, Bill Gates was named the richest man in the world by Forbes' 2016 list of the world's billionaires. This is the 17th time that the founder of Microsoft had claimed the top spot. Amancio Ortega rose from last year's position of number four to second. Warren Buffett of Berkshire Hathaway came in third for the second consecutive time, while Mexican telecommunication mogul Carlos Slim slipped from last year's second position to fourth. Jeff Bezos of Amazon, Mark Zuckerberg of Facebook and Michael Bloomberg of Bloomberg L.P., appeared for the first time on the Forbes top 10 billionaires list, coming at fifth, sixth and eighth positions, respectively. Zuckerberg became the youngest top 10 billionaire this year at the age of 31. Larry Ellison, Charles Koch and David Koch also slipped from their previous year's positions, with Ellison dropping to seventh from fifth, and the Kochs falling to ninth position from sixth.

No.	Name	Net worth (USD)	Age	Nationality	Source(s) of wealth
1	Bill Gates	$75.0 billion ▼	60	United States	Microsoft
2 ▲	Amancio Ortega	$67.0 billion ▲	79	Spain	Inditex
3	Warren Buffett	$60.8 billion ▼	85	United States	Berkshire Hathaway
4 ▼	Carlos Slim	$50.0 billion ▼	76	Mexico	América Móvil, Grupo Carso
5 ▲	Jeff Bezos	$45.2 billion ▲	52	United States	Amazon
6 ▲	Mark Zuckerberg	$44.6 billion ▲	31	United States	Facebook, Inc.
7 ▼	Larry Ellison	$43.6 billion ▼	71	United States	Oracle Corporation
8 ▲	Michael Bloomberg	$40.0 billion ▲	74	United States	Bloomberg L.P.
9 ▼	Charles Koch	$39.6 billion ▼	80	United States	Koch Industries
9 ▼	David Koch	$39.6 billion ▼	75	United States	Koch Industries

=== 2017 ===
On the 30th anniversary of the Forbes list of the world's billionaires, for the fourth year in a row, Bill Gates was named the richest man in the world. In 2017, there was a record of 2,043 people on the list, which is the first time over 2,000 people were listed. This included 195 newcomers of whom 76 were from China and 25 from the U.S.; there were 56 people under 40 and it had a record of 227 women. The number of billionaires increased 13% to 2,043 from 1,810 in 2016; this was the biggest change in over 30 years of tracking billionaires globally. Added together, the total net worth for 2017's billionaires was US$7.67 trillion, up from US$7.1 trillion in 2015. This was the first time after 12 years that Carlos Slim was not within the top five. The U.S. had the most billionaires in the world, with a record of 565. China had 319 (not including Hong Kong, Taiwan or Macau), Germany had 114, and India had the fourth most with 101; India reached over 100 billionaires for its first time.

No.	Name	Net worth (USD)	Age	Nationality	Source(s) of wealth
1	Bill Gates	$86.0 billion ▲	61	United States	Microsoft
2 ▲	Warren Buffett	$75.6 billion ▲	86	United States	Berkshire Hathaway
3 ▲	Jeff Bezos	$72.8 billion ▲	53	United States	Amazon
4 ▼	Amancio Ortega	$71.3 billion ▲	80	Spain	Inditex, Zara
5 ▲	Mark Zuckerberg	$56.0 billion ▲	32	United States	Facebook, Inc.
6 ▼	Carlos Slim	$54.5 billion ▲	77	Mexico	América Móvil, Grupo Carso
7	Larry Ellison	$52.2 billion ▲	72	United States	Oracle Corporation
8 ▲	Charles Koch	$48.3 billion ▲	81	United States	Koch Industries
8 ▲	David Koch	$48.3 billion ▲	76	United States	Koch Industries
10 ▼	Michael Bloomberg	$47.5 billion ▲	75	United States	Bloomberg L.P.

=== 2018 ===
In the 32nd annual Forbes list of the world's billionaires, the aggregate wealth of the top 20 richest people on Earth amounted to about 13 percent of all billionaires' fortunes combined. A record of 2,208 billionaires were in the ranking and the total wealth was $9.1 trillion, up 18% since 2017. For the first time, Jeff Bezos was listed as the top billionaire due to Amazon's rising stock price that resulted in one person's biggest one-year gain in wealth ($35 billion) since Forbes started tracking in 1987. The U.S. had the most billionaires in the world, with 585, while China was catching up with 476 when including Hong Kong, Macau and Taiwan; it had 372 when excluding those three places. Forbes excluded Al-Walid bin Talal and all other Saudi billionaires due to the absence of accurate wealth estimations as a result of the 2017–19 Saudi Arabian purge.

No.	Name	Net worth (USD)	Age	Nationality	Source(s) of wealth
1 ▲	Jeff Bezos	$112 billion ▲	54	United States	Amazon
2 ▼	Bill Gates	$90 billion ▲	62	United States	Microsoft
3 ▼	Warren Buffett	$84 billion ▲	87	United States	Berkshire Hathaway
4 ▲	Bernard Arnault	$72 billion ▲	69	France	LVMH
5	Mark Zuckerberg	$71 billion ▲	33	United States	Facebook, Inc.
6 ▼	Amancio Ortega	$70 billion ▼	81	Spain	Inditex, Zara
7 ▼	Carlos Slim	$67.1 billion ▲	78	Mexico	América Móvil, Grupo Carso
8	Charles Koch	$60 billion ▲	82	United States	Koch Industries
8	David Koch	$60 billion ▲	77	United States	Koch Industries
10 ▼	Larry Ellison	$58.5 billion ▲	73	United States	Oracle Corporation

=== 2019 ===
In the 33rd annual Forbes list of the world's billionaires, the list included 2,153 billionaires with a total net wealth of $8.7 trillion, down 55 members and $400 billion from 2018. The U.S. continued to have the most billionaires in the world, with a record of 609, while China dropped to 324 (when not including Hong Kong, Macau and Taiwan).

No.	Name	Net worth (USD)	Age	Nationality	Source(s) of wealth
1	Jeff Bezos	$131 billion ▲	55	United States	Amazon
2	Bill Gates	$96.5 billion ▲	63	United States	Microsoft
3	Warren Buffett	$82.5 billion ▼	88	United States	Berkshire Hathaway
4	Bernard Arnault	$76 billion ▲	70	France	LVMH
5 ▲	Carlos Slim	$64 billion ▼	79	Mexico	América Móvil, Grupo Carso
6	Amancio Ortega	$62.7 billion ▼	82	Spain	Inditex, Zara
7 ▲	Larry Ellison	$62.5 billion ▲	74	United States	Oracle Corporation
8 ▼	Mark Zuckerberg	$62.3 billion ▼	34	United States	Facebook, Inc.
9 ▲	Michael Bloomberg	$55.5 billion ▲	77	United States	Bloomberg L.P.
10 ▲	Larry Page	$50.8 billion ▲	45	United States	Google

=== 2020 ===
In the 34th annual Forbes list of the world's billionaires, the list included 2,095 billionaires with a total net wealth of $8 trillion, down 58 members and $700 billion from 2019; 51% of these billionaires had less wealth than they possessed last year. The list was finalized as of 18 March, thus was already partially influenced by the COVID-19 pandemic.

No.	Name	Net worth (USD)	Age	Nationality	Source(s) of wealth
1	Jeff Bezos	$113 billion ▼	56	United States	Amazon
2	Bill Gates	$98 billion ▲	64	United States	Microsoft
3 ▲	Bernard Arnault & family	$76 billion	71	France	LVMH
4 ▼	Warren Buffett	$67.5 billion ▼	89	United States	Berkshire Hathaway
5 ▲	Larry Ellison	$59 billion ▼	75	United States	Oracle Corporation
6	Amancio Ortega	$55.1 billion ▼	84	Spain	Inditex, Zara
7 ▲	Mark Zuckerberg	$54.7 billion ▼	35	United States	Facebook, Inc.
8 ▲	Jim Walton	$54.6 billion ▲	71	United States	Walmart
9 ▲	Alice Walton	$54.4 billion ▲	70	United States	Walmart
10 ▲	S. Robson Walton	$54.1 billion ▲	77	United States	Walmart

=== 2021 ===
In the 35th annual Forbes list of the world's billionaires, the list included 2,755 billionaires with a total net wealth of $13.1 trillion, up 660 members from 2020; 86% of these billionaires had more wealth than they possessed last year.

No.	Name	Net worth (USD)	Age	Nationality	Source(s) of wealth
1	Jeff Bezos	$177 billion ▲	57	United States	Amazon
2 ▲	Elon Musk	$151 billion ▲	49	South Africa; Canada; United States	Tesla, SpaceX
3	Bernard Arnault & family	$150 billion ▲	72	France	LVMH
4 ▼	Bill Gates	$124 billion ▲	65	United States	Microsoft
5 ▲	Mark Zuckerberg	$97 billion ▲	36	United States	Meta Platforms
6 ▼	Warren Buffett	$96 billion ▲	90	United States	Berkshire Hathaway
7 ▼	Larry Ellison	$93 billion ▲	76	United States	Oracle Corporation
8 ▲	Larry Page	$91.5 billion ▲	48	United States	Google
9 ▲	Sergey Brin	$89 billion ▲	47	United States	Google
10 ▲	Mukesh Ambani	$84.5 billion ▲	63	India	Reliance Industries

=== 2022 ===
In the 36th annual Forbes list of the world's billionaires, the list included 2,668 billionaires with a total net wealth of $12.7 trillion, down 97 members from 2021.

No.	Name	Net worth (USD)	Age	Nationality	Primary source(s) of wealth
1 ▲	Elon Musk	$219 billion ▲	50	South Africa; Canada; United States	Tesla, SpaceX
2 ▼	Jeff Bezos	$177 billion ▼	58	United States	Amazon
3	Bernard Arnault & family	$158 billion ▲	73	France	LVMH
4	Bill Gates	$129 billion ▲	66	United States	Microsoft
5 ▲	Warren Buffett	$118 billion ▲	91	United States	Berkshire Hathaway
6 ▲	Larry Page	$111 billion ▲	49	United States	Google
7 ▲	Sergey Brin	$107 billion ▲	48	United States	Google
8 ▼	Larry Ellison	$106 billion ▲	77	United States	Oracle Corporation
9 ▲	Steve Ballmer	$91.4 billion ▲	66	United States	Microsoft
10	Mukesh Ambani	$90.7 billion ▲	64	India	Reliance Industries

=== 2023 ===
In the 37th annual Forbes list of the world's billionaires, the list included 2,640 billionaires with a total net wealth of $12.2 trillion, down 28 members and $500 billion from 2022. Over half of the list is less wealthy compared to the previous year, including Elon Musk, who fell from No. 1 to No. 2. The list also marks for the first time a French citizen was in the top position as well as a non-American for the first time since 2013 when the Mexican Carlos Slim Helu was the world's richest person. The list, like in 2022, counted 15 under 30 billionaires with the richest of them being Red Bull heir Mark Mateschitz with a net worth of $34.7 billion. The youngest of the lot were Clemente Del Vecchio, heir to the Luxottica fortune shared with his six siblings and stepmother, and Kim Jung-yang, whose fortune lies in Japanese-South Korean gaming giant Nexon, both under-20s.

No.	Name	Net worth (USD)	Age	Nationality	Primary source(s) of wealth
1 ▲	Bernard Arnault & family	$211 billion ▲	74	France	LVMH
2 ▼	Elon Musk	$180 billion ▼	51	South Africa; Canada; United States	Tesla, SpaceX
3 ▼	Jeff Bezos	$114 billion ▼	59	United States	Amazon
4 ▲	Larry Ellison	$107 billion ▲	78	United States	Oracle Corporation
5	Warren Buffett	$106 billion ▼	92	United States	Berkshire Hathaway
6 ▼	Bill Gates	$104 billion ▼	67	United States	Microsoft
7 ▲	Michael Bloomberg	$94.5 billion ▲	81	United States	Bloomberg L.P.
8 ▲	Carlos Slim & family	$93 billion ▲	83	Mexico	Telmex, América Móvil, Grupo Carso
9 ▲	Mukesh Ambani	$83.4 billion ▼	65	India	Reliance Industries
10 ▼	Steve Ballmer	$80.7 billion ▼	67	United States	Microsoft

=== 2024 ===
The 38th annual Forbes list of the world's billionaires found a record 2,781 billionaires with a total net wealth of $14.2 trillion. This is an increase of 141 members and $2 trillion from 2023, which held the previous record for the highest net worth gain on the list, surpassing the $900 billion record set in 2022. Two-thirds of the list members are wealthier compared to the previous year, including Mark Zuckerberg, whose net worth increased by $112.6 billion.

No.	Name	Net worth (USD)	Age	Nationality	Primary source(s) of wealth
1	Bernard Arnault & family	$233 billion ▲	75	France	LVMH
2	Elon Musk	$195 billion ▲	52	South Africa; Canada; United States	Tesla, SpaceX
3	Jeff Bezos	$194 billion ▲	60	United States	Amazon
4 ▲	Mark Zuckerberg	$177 billion ▲	39	United States	Meta Platforms
5 ▼	Larry Ellison	$141 billion ▲	79	United States	Oracle Corporation
6 ▼	Warren Buffett	$133 billion ▲	93	United States	Berkshire Hathaway
7 ▼	Bill Gates	$128 billion ▲	68	United States	Microsoft
8 ▲	Steve Ballmer	$121 billion ▲	68	United States	Microsoft
9	Mukesh Ambani	$116 billion ▲	66	India	Reliance Industries
10 ▲	Larry Page	$114 billion ▲	51	United States	Google

=== 2025 ===
The 39th annual Forbes list of the world's billionaires found a record 3,028 billionaires with a total net worth of $16.1 trillion. This represents an increase of 247 members and $1.9 trillion compared to 2024. This year also marked the first time Bill Gates dropped out of the top 10 richest people, which he had been part of for 33 years since the 6th annual Forbes list of the world's billionaires in 1992.

No.	Name	Net worth (USD)	Age	Nationality	Primary source(s) of wealth
1 ▲	Elon Musk	$342 billion ▲	53	South Africa; Canada; United States	Tesla and SpaceX
2 ▲	Mark Zuckerberg	$216 billion ▲	40	United States	Meta Platforms
3	Jeff Bezos	$215 billion ▲	61	United States	Amazon
4 ▲	Larry Ellison	$192 billion ▲	80	United States	Oracle Corporation
5 ▼	Bernard Arnault & family	$178 billion ▼	76	France	LVMH
6	Warren Buffett	$154 billion ▲	94	United States	Berkshire Hathaway
7 ▲	Larry Page	$144 billion ▲	52	United States	Google
8 ▲	Sergey Brin	$138 billion ▲	51	United States	Google
9 ▲	Amancio Ortega	$124 billion ▲	89	Spain	Inditex
10 ▼	Steve Ballmer	$118 billion ▼	69	United States	Microsoft

=== 2026 ===
The 40th annual Forbes list of the world's billionaires found a record 3,428 billionaires with a total net worth of $20.1 trillion. This represents an increase of 309 members and $4 trillion compared to 2025. For the first time, Nvidia CEO and founder Jensen Huang appeared in the top 10.

No.	Name	Net worth (USD)	Age	Nationality	Primary source(s) of wealth
1	Elon Musk	$907 billion ▲	54	United States	Tesla and SpaceX
2 ▲	Larry Page	$257 billion ▲	52	United States	Google
3 ▲	Sergey Brin	$237 billion ▲	52	United States	Google
4 ▼	Jeff Bezos	$224 billion ▲	62	United States	Amazon
5 ▼	Mark Zuckerberg	$222 billion ▲	41	United States	Meta Platforms
6 ▼	Larry Ellison	$190 billion ▼	81	United States	Oracle Corporation
7 ▼	Bernard Arnault & family	$171 billion ▼	77	France	LVMH
8 ▲	Jensen Huang	$154 billion ▲	63	Taiwan; United States	Nvidia
9 ▼	Warren Buffett	$149 billion ▼	95	United States	Berkshire Hathaway
10 ▼	Amancio Ortega	$148 billion ▲	89	Spain	Inditex

== Statistics ==
The dot-com bubble created the most paper wealth for some billionaires. However, once it burst, the new rich saw their fortunes disappear. Billionaires' fortunes were hit even harder by the Great Recession; 2009 was the first time in five years that the world had a net loss in the number of billionaires. The strong performance of the financial markets and global economic recovery have erased financial assets losses. Most of the richest people in the world saw their fortunes soar in the early 2010s.

Number and combined net worth of billionaires by year
Year	Number of billionaires	Combined net worth
2000	470	$898 billion
2001	538	$1.8 trillion
2002	497	$1.5 trillion
2003	476	$1.4 trillion
2004	587	$1.9 trillion
2005	691	$2.2 trillion
2006	793	$2.6 trillion
2007	946	$3.5 trillion
2008	1,125	$4.4 trillion
2009	793	$2.4 trillion
2010	1,011	$3.6 trillion
2011	1,210	$4.5 trillion
2012	1,226	$4.6 trillion
2013	1,426	$5.4 trillion
2014	1,645	$6.4 trillion
2015	1,826	$7.1 trillion
2016	1,810	$6.5 trillion
2017	2,043	$7.7 trillion
2018	2,208	$9.1 trillion
2019	2,153	$8.7 trillion
2020	2,095	$8.0 trillion
2021	2,755	$13.1 trillion
2022	2,668	$12.7 trillion
2023	2,640	$12.2 trillion
2024	2,781	$14.2 trillion
2025	3,028	$16.1 trillion
2026	3,428	$20.1 trillion
Sources: Forbes.

== See also ==
- Bloomberg Billionaires Index
- List of centibillionaires
- List of cities by number of billionaires
- List of countries by number of billionaires
- List of wealthiest animals
- List of wealthiest families
- List of wealthiest religious organizations
