= Walton Enterprises =

Family office of the Waltons

Walton Enterprises LLC
- Company type: Limited liability company
- Industry: Holding company
- Founded: 1953; 73 years ago
- Founder: Sam Walton
- Headquarters: Bentonville, Arkansas, U.S.
- AUM: $225 billion (2024)
- Owner: Walton family
- Divisions: WIT LLC
- Subsidiaries: Walmart (37.3%)

Walton Enterprises LLC (WEI) is an American investment holding company based in Bentonville, Arkansas, that serves as a family office to manage the wealth of the Walton family, the owners of Walmart.

Walton Enterprises is Walmart's largest shareholder and the world's largest family office.

== Background ==
In the early 1950s, Sam Walton was building his business by opening retail stores. His father-in-law, Leland Robson, convinced him that he should organize his own business as a family partnership.

In 1953, Walton Enterprises was established. Sam, Helen, and their four children Rob, John, Jim and Alice were all partners of the company per the legal documents. Sam and Helen owned 20% together while each child owned 20% personally.

According to Sam, their Walmart stocks went into WEI. Then the family which is its board makes decisions on a consensus basis. The amount paid out to each person is the same and is agreed upon. That way, the family accumulated funds in WEI rather than throwing it all over the place to live high.

Rob, using his law expertise, helped organize his family's ownership in Walmart into WEI, and also did legal work for Walmart's IPO in October 1970.

In 1975, the family agreed to make Jim the president of WEI since he was seen as being as tightfisted with money as his father.

By 1989, besides holding 218 million Walmart common shares, WEI also had acquired extensive real estate holdings, four banks and half of a fifth bank, and other assorted businesses. Notable examples include Arvest Bank and Llama Company.

After Sam and Helen died, their ownership of WEI passed to various family charities. The charities would get a minority interest in WEI, so that the stock voting rights remained under the control of the family. By turning over ownership of 80% children so early on with the remaining going to charities, substantial gift or inheritance taxes were avoided.

At the end of the 1990s, there was an effort to repeal inheritance taxes. WEI paid Patton Boggs to lobby on tax matters during that time. It supported "private foundation reforms to create new incentives for charitable giving" and did not involve "the specific issue of repealing the estate tax."

In March 2020, the Walton family transferred 14% of Walmart's outstanding shares from WEI to the Walton Family Holdings Trust which was formed in April 2015. However this did not change the family's total percentage of Walmart ownership which was about half of its outstanding shares.

While the majority of each Walton family member's wealth is in WEI, they also have holdings outside it. As a result, they are not equally wealthy.

== Investment operations ==
The investment arm of WEI is WIT LLC, an acronym for the Walton Investment Team. It commenced operations in 2020 a few months before WEI transferred some Walmart shares to the Walton Family Holdings Trust.

WIT held almost $5 billion in equities at the end of June 2021. Most of it was invested in low-cost exchange-traded funds (ETFs) such as the Vanguard FTSE Emerging Markets and Short-Term treasury ETFs. It also holds stakes in companies such as Apollo Global Management, Snowflake Inc. and Pinduoduo.

WEI doesn't disclose much about its assets which are run via a web of trusts and companies. Tax records of private trusts showed it held stakes in hedge funds run by Tiger Global Management and Viking Global Investors.
