= Llama Company =

American investment bank

The Llama Company
- Type: Private
- Industry: Investment banking
- Founded: 1988
- Founder: Alice Walton
- Defunct: 1998
- Headquarters: Fayetteville, Arkansas
- Number of employees: 90

The Llama Company was an investment bank founded by Alice Walton as a subsidiary of Walton Enterprises. It was headquartered in Fayetteville, Arkansas, and was founded in 1988, and was engaged in corporate finance, public and structured finance, real estate finance and sales and trading. Walton was President, Chairperson, and CEO of the company. The Walton family also operates a commercial bank, Arvest Bank. Alice's ownership stake in Llama likely prevented her from having equity in Arvest.

Although initially somewhat successful, the bank was closed in 1998 due to Walton's legal problems and economic uncertainty that also caused the failure of Long-Term Capital Management, a hedge fund. Llama went defunct approximately one month after Walton resigned from her role as its chief executive. Upon closure, the bank employed roughly ninety people.
