= Art Bridges Foundation =

Foundation lending art to American museums

- Formation: 2017; 9 years ago
- Founder: Alice Walton
- Type: 501(c)(3)
- Headquarters: Bentonville, Arkansas
- Key people: Anne Kraybill (CEO)

Art Bridges Foundation, referred to as Art Bridges, is an American nonprofit organization founded by Alice Walton in 2017. The foundation partners with museums across the United States to lend and share American art.

== Foundation overview ==
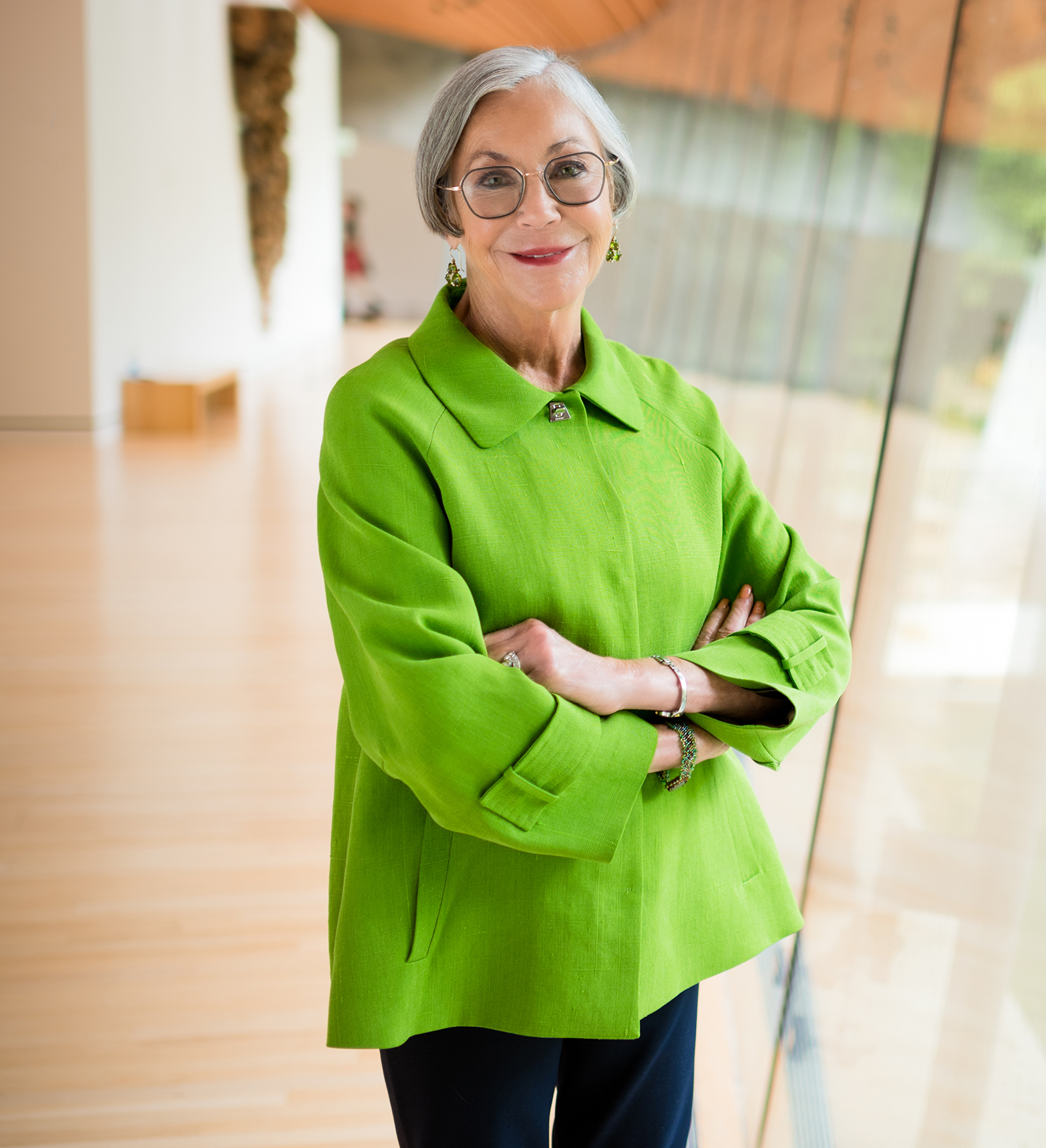
Founder Alice Walton in 2021

Alice Walton announced Art Bridges Foundation in 2017, based in Bentonville, Arkansas. Paul Provost was named as the foundation's CEO in 2019.

Art Bridges lends American art around the United States, supporting both smaller underfunded museums and large museums. The pieces come from its own collection and, since 2021, from its lending partners, which it connects with borrowing institutions via its Partner Loan Network. The intention of the foundation is to showcase art that would otherwise be stored and share the pieces with smaller museums lacking the resources to host the pieces or expand. The foundation has an in-house curatorial department and partners with established museums to organize exhibitions. It also acts like a conventional arts funder, awarding grants to its partner museums. As of 2022, its lending partners include Joslyn Art Museum in Omaha, Nebraska, Los Angeles County Museum of Art, and the Crystal Bridges Museum of American Art in Bentonville, Arkansas.

As of 2022, Art Bridges' board includes the chair Alice Walton, Michael Govan, Glenn D. Lowry, and Darren Walker. Anne Kraybill began as CEO in January 2024.

== History ==
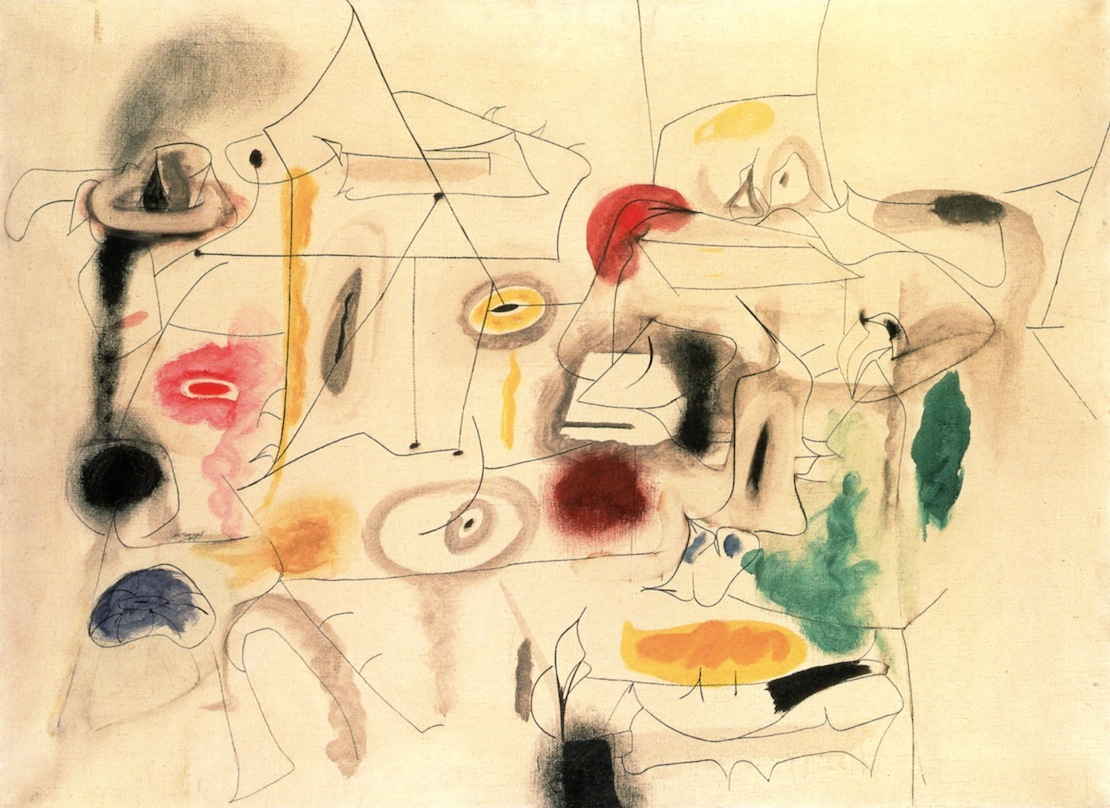
"Child's Companion", by Arshile Gorky

During its inaugural year in 2017, Art Bridges' collection had approximately 40 pieces including Arshile Gorky's 1945 painting "Child's Companion", and Jeff Koons' 1985 "One Ball Total Equilibrium Tank (Spalding Dr. J Silver Series)". As of 2021, the foundation had partnered with more than 250 museums and has up to 30 exhibits traveling the country at a given time. In 2022, there were nine reported museums designated as borrowers, which were made up of rural or regional venues with annual budgets of under $7 million. Borrowing museums receive 10–15 pieces at a time. Lent works include paintings, lithographs, photographs, sculptures, and videos. The selected artwork is picked by staff with gender diversity, racial, or demographic identity in mind.

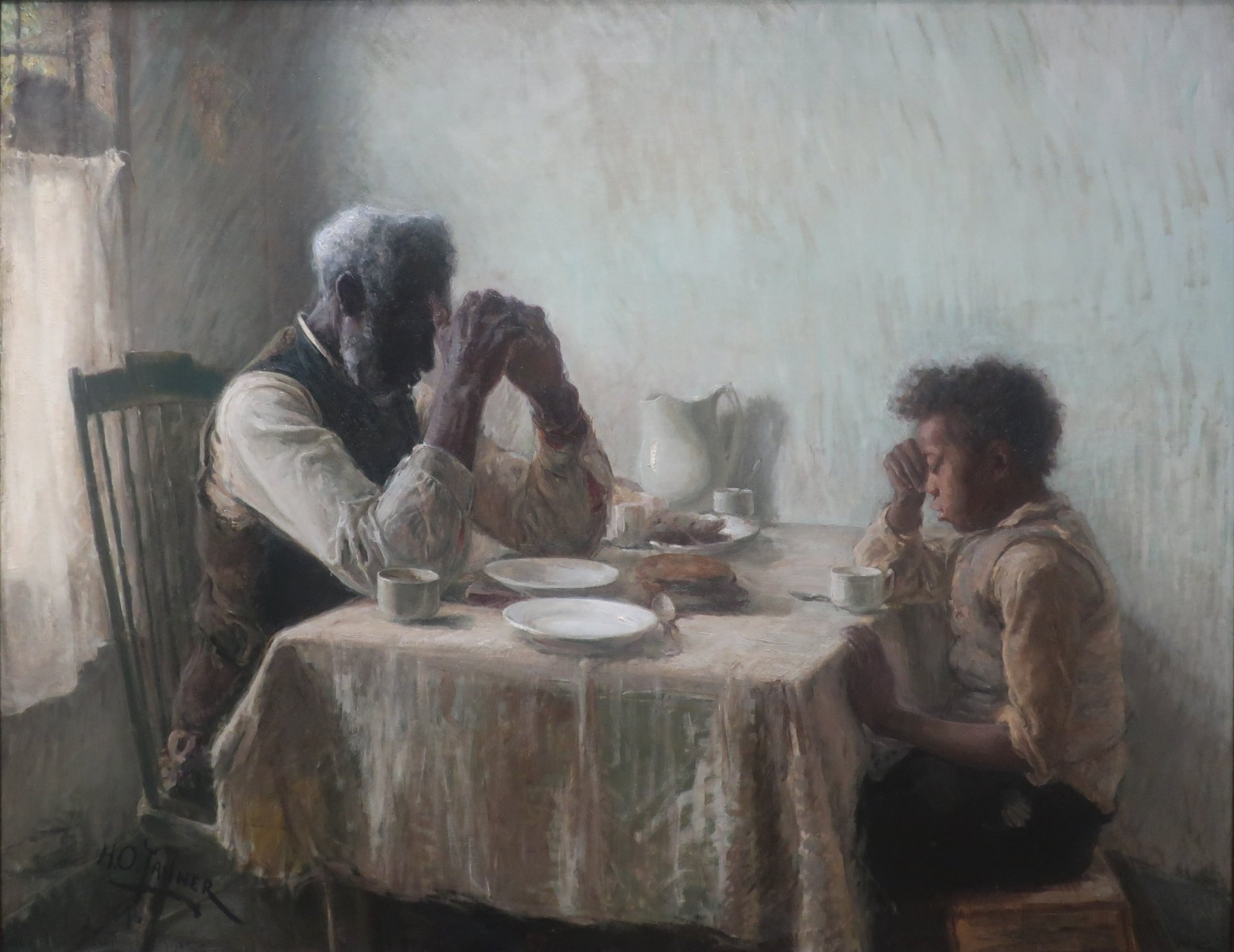
The Thankful Poor, Henry Ossawa Tanner, 1894, Art Bridges Foundation

In October 2017, Arkansas Business reported that Art Bridges partnered with the American Federation of Arts in New York City to bring the collection "Selections from The Studio Museum in Harlem" to six museums.

In 2021, the foundation began the Collection Loan Partnership, later Partner Loan Network, where other museums and foundations could join Art Bridges in lending out their collections to museums. As of 2022, this program offered 170 pieces of art by 136 artists.

During 2023, Art Bridges helped with the initiative that curated the exhibition "Many Wests: Artists Shape an American Idea", which was curated by five museums and organized by the Smithsonian American Art Museum and Art Bridges.

== Grants and programs ==
In 2018, Art Bridges and the Terra Foundation for American Art granted $2.4 million in funds for museums to develop traveling exhibitions and art sharing among a network of museums intended to be as large as 80 organizations. The money was granted to the Detroit Institute of Arts and the Museum of Fine Arts, Boston for a six-year program. In addition to that, Art Bridges and Terra Foundation also awarded a research-and-development grant to the Philadelphia Museum of Art.

In 2020, Art Bridges announced a $5 million initiative called "Bridge Ahead" that intended to support partner museums affected by the COVID-19 pandemic. Distributed funds include $20,000 to the Dennos Museum Center in Traverse City, Michigan, and $70,000 to the George Eastman Museum in Rochester, New York.

Art Bridges also gives museums funding for other programs such as education about the exhibits or community projects. Partner museums supplement their artwork with tangential education opportunities while working with Art Bridges. The Allentown Art Museum had an exhibition that was accompanied by a quilting and oral history project taught by artists. Art Bridges distributed a grant to the San Antonio Museum of Art that was used to commission three murals by local artists that were unveiled in 2021.

The Art Bridges Fellows Program selects individuals from underrepresented populations to participate in a three-year fellowship with the foundation's museum partners.

In 2023, the Art Bridges Cohort Program issued a $2 million grant for the Wadsworth Atheneum Museum of Art, South Carolina's Columbia Museum of Art, and Alabama's Mobile Museum of Art and Montgomery Museum of Fine Arts to create a series of traveling exhibitions called the American South Consortium. Tours were set to run from spring 2023 to early 2026.

=== Access for All ===
In 2023 the Foundation created the Access for All grant program with $40 million to assist with community museum attendance and engagement. It was created due to a decrease in museum attendance since the COVID-19 pandemic. As of 2025 there were 64 museums in the program, including the Orlando Museum of Art, Wichita Art Museum, the San Diego Museum of Art, and the Delaware Art Museum. The program provides three-year grants, allowing museums to offer free admittance, host activities, or create community programs.
