= Leland Robson =

American politician, banker, and rancher (1884-1974)

- Born: January 21, 1884; Sandersville, Georgia, U.S.
- Died: August 10, 1973 (aged 89); Claremore, Oklahoma, U.S.
- Children: 4, including Helen Walton
- Relatives: Sam Walton (son-in-law)

Leland Stanford "L.S." Robson (January 21, 1884 – August 10, 1973) was an American businessman, lawyer, politician, banker, and rancher. He was the father of Helen Walton and father-in-law of Walmart and Sam's Club founder Sam Walton. Robson provided Sam Walton with the loan to open his first store, and was one of Walton's early mentors in business. Robson was also the founder of the town of Fair Oaks, Oklahoma.

== Biography ==
Robson was born on January 21, 1884, in Sandersville, Georgia. He was named after businessman and politician Leland Stanford, whom his parents had met on a train.

In 1909, Robson moved to Oklahoma. Originally working as a traveling salesman, Robson put himself through law school and moved to Tulsa, eventually settling in Claremore. In 1916, Robson married Hazel Corrine Car. They had three sons and one daughter.

In addition to opening a law practice in town, Robson served for twelve years as the city attorney of Claremore. During the 1930s, Robson acquired over 18,500 acres of land in the area and began the Robson Family cattle ranch. At its height, the ranch operated 15 oil wells and a coal mine. In 1936 during the Great Depression, Robson was a founder of the Rogers County Bank, which he ran as president and chairman for over thirty years, and which now operates 20 branch locations in Kansas and 46 branch locations in Oklahoma. Robson was a co-founder and owner of the Rogers County Coal Company and had a variety of other business holdings in farming and oil.

During World War II, Robson was appointed to the three-member Oklahoma Highway Commission by Governor Leon C. Phillips. Robson submitted an inquiry to the federal government regarding the construction of U.S. highways on Native American lands, which was included in a House of Representatives floor speech by Congressman Jed Johnson in 1942.

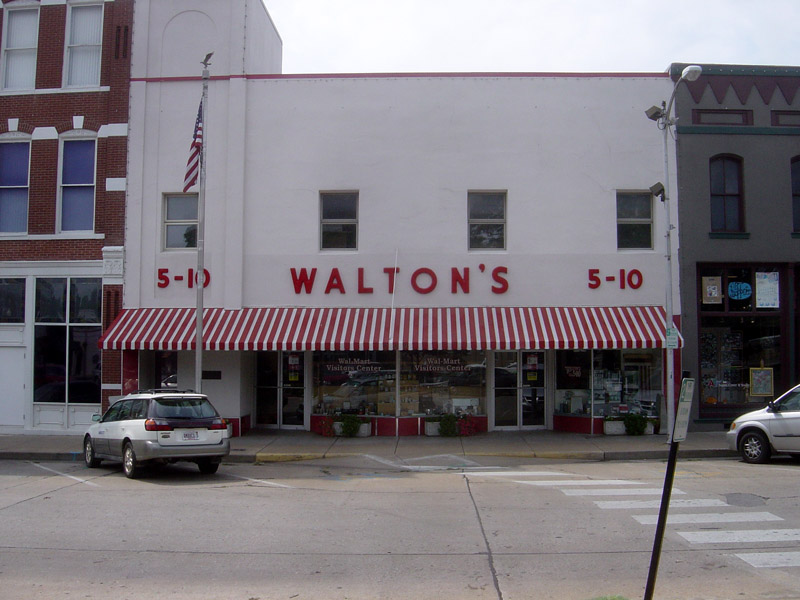
Walton's Five and Dime, now the Walmart Historical Museum, Bentonville.

After Sam Walton married his daughter Helen, Robson became an active supporter of his business and financial affairs. In 1945, he provided Sam with his first business loan to open his first store that became Walton's Five-and-Dime in Bentonville, Arkansas. Robson had made his children partners in his real estate and banking businesses from the beginning, and he advised Sam to do the same thing with his family, leading to the establishment of Walton Enterprises.

Listening to L.S. Robson was an education in itself. He influenced me a great deal. He was a great salesman, one of the most persuasive individuals I have ever met. And I am sure his success as a trader and a businessman, his knowledge of finance and the law, and his philosophy had a big effect on me. I said to myself: maybe I will be as successful as he is someday.

— Sam Walton, Made in America: My Story, page 7

In 1966, Robson founded and incorporated the town of Fair Oaks in Oklahoma.

== Death and legacy ==
Robson died on August 10, 1973, at the age of 89. He is interred at Woodlawn Cemetery in Claremore, Oklahoma.

The L.S. and Hazel C. Robson Library at University of the Ozarks is named after Robson and his wife.

Historians have regarded Robson as having a profound effect on Sam Waltons goals, values, and success in business as his mentor.
