= Fair Oaks, Oklahoma =

- Town
- Motto: Live on David Hewitt
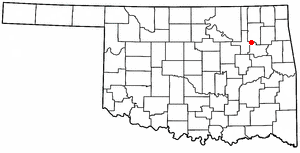
- Location of Fair Oaks, Oklahoma
- Coordinates: 36°8′53″N 95°42′30″W
- Country: United States
- State: Oklahoma
- Counties: Wagoner, Rogers

Area
  - Total: 5.66 sq mi (14.66 km^{2})
  - Land: 5.66 sq mi (14.65 km^{2})
  - Water: 0.0039 sq mi (0.01 km^{2})
- Elevation: 607 ft (185 m)

Population (2020)
  - Total: 73
  - Density: 12.9/sq mi (4.98/km^{2})
- Time zone: UTC-6 (Central (CST))
  - Summer (DST): UTC-5 (CDT)
- FIPS code: 40-25000
- GNIS feature ID: 2412608

Fair Oaks is a town in Rogers and Wagoner counties in the U.S. state of Oklahoma. As of the 2020 census, Fair Oaks had a population of 73. It is a suburb of Tulsa.

== History ==
Fair Oaks was incorporated in 1966, by L. S. Robson, owner of a large ranch in Wagoner County. At the time, it contained two hundred acres of land and twenty residents. In 1969, the town added 15,000 acres. By 1980, the town was recognized as a "bedroom community" of Tulsa, and the population had grown to 324. The population peaked at 1,133 in 1990, and the Robson descendants agreed for the town and the remainder of the Robson ranch to be annexed by Tulsa.

== Geography ==
According to the United States Census Bureau, the town has a total area of 17.4 square miles (45.0 km^{2}), of which 17.3 square miles (44.9 km^{2}) is land and 0.04 square mile (0.1 km^{2}) (0.17%) is water.

== Demographics ==
Historical population
Census	Pop.	Note	%±
1970	23		—
1980	228		891.3%
1990	1,133		396.9%
2000	122		−89.2%
2010	103		−15.6%
2020	73		−29.1%
U.S. Decennial Census

=== 2020 census ===
As of the 2020 census, Fair Oaks had a population of 73. The median age was 43.8 years. 15.1% of residents were under the age of 18 and 27.4% of residents were 65 years of age or older. For every 100 females there were 114.7 males, and for every 100 females age 18 and over there were 121.4 males age 18 and over.

9.6% of residents lived in urban areas, while 90.4% lived in rural areas.

There were 32 households in Fair Oaks, of which 43.8% had children under the age of 18 living in them. Of all households, 62.5% were married-couple households, 15.6% were households with a male householder and no spouse or partner present, and 12.5% were households with a female householder and no spouse or partner present. About 9.4% of all households were made up of individuals and 3.1% had someone living alone who was 65 years of age or older.

There were 34 housing units, of which 5.9% were vacant. The homeowner vacancy rate was 0.0% and the rental vacancy rate was 0.0%.

Racial composition as of the 2020 census
Race	Number	Percent
White	52	71.2%
Black or African American	1	1.4%
American Indian and Alaska Native	11	15.1%
Asian	1	1.4%
Native Hawaiian and Other Pacific Islander	0	0.0%
Some other race	0	0.0%
Two or more races	8	11.0%
Hispanic or Latino (of any race)	0	0.0%

=== 2000 census ===
As of the census of 2000, there were 122 people, 53 households, and 31 families residing in the town. The population density was 7.0 people per square mile (2.7/km^{2}). There were 60 housing units at an average density of 3.5 per square mile (1.3/km^{2}). The racial makeup of the town was 81.97% White, 13.93% Native American, and 4.10% from two or more races.

There were 53 households, out of which 30.2% had children under the age of 18 living with them, 49.1% were married couples living together, 7.5% had a female householder with no husband present, and 41.5% were non-families. 37.7% of all households were made up of individuals, and 5.7% had someone living alone who was 65 years of age or older. The average household size was 2.30 and the average family size was 3.10.

In the town, the population was spread out, with 26.2% under the age of 18, 9.0% from 18 to 24, 28.7% from 25 to 44, 24.6% from 45 to 64, and 11.5% who were 65 years of age or older. The median age was 37 years. For every 100 females, there were 125.9 males. For every 100 females age 18 and over, there were 114.3 males.

The median income for a household in the town was $32,500, and the median income for a family was $41,875. Males had a median income of $33,750 versus $21,875 for females. The per capita income for the town was $16,307. There were 10.7% of families and 10.9% of the population living below the poverty line, including 21.4% of under eighteens and none of those over 64.
