= Jim Walton =

American businessman (born 1948)

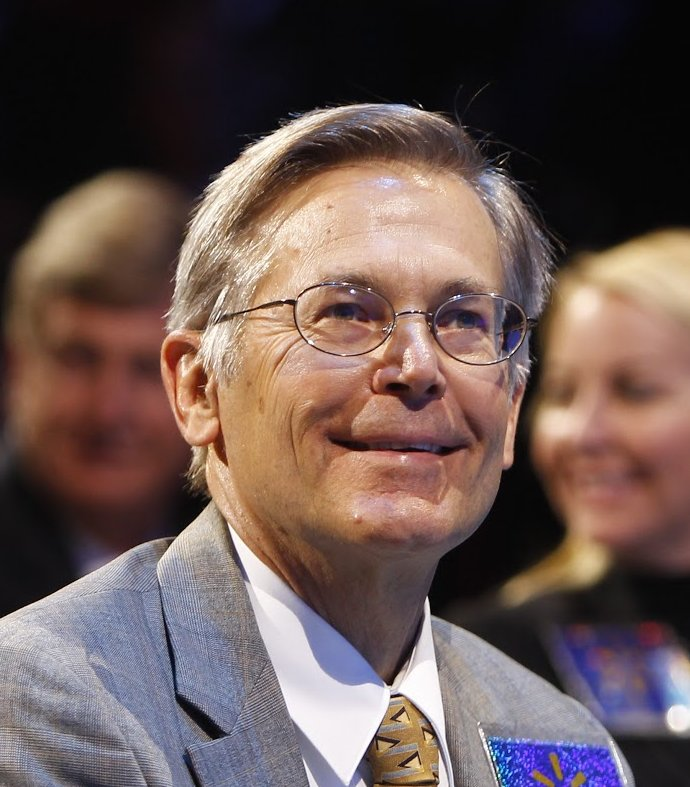
- Walton in 2011
- Born: James Carr Walton; June 7, 1948 (age 78); Newport, Arkansas, U.S.
- Education: University of Arkansas (BS)
- Occupations: Businessman; stock trader
- Political party: Independent
- Board member of: Arvest Bank (chairman); Community Publishers (chairman); Walmart (heir)
- Spouse: Lynne McNabb
- Children: 4
- Parents: Sam Walton (father); Helen Walton (mother)
- Relatives: Rob Walton (brother); John Walton (brother); Alice Walton (sister); Ann Walton Kroenke (cousin); Kelly Rohrbach (daughter-in-law)
- Family: Walton

James Carr Walton (born June 7, 1948) is an American businessman, currently an heir to the fortune of Walmart, the world's largest retailer. As of February 2026, Walton is the 12th-richest person in the world, with a net worth of US$142.4 billion according to Forbes. He is the youngest son of Sam Walton.

== Early life ==
Jim Walton was born in Newport, Jackson County, Arkansas, the third child of Walmart co-founder Sam Walton (1918–1992) and Helen Walton (1919–2007), with siblings Rob Walton, Alice Walton, and John Walton (1946 – 2005). Walton graduated from Bentonville High School in 1965, where he was president of his junior class, played football at all-state level and also learned to fly a plane. Walton received a bachelor's degree in Business Administration in Marketing from the University of Arkansas in Fayetteville, Arkansas in 1971, where he was also a member of the Lambda Chi Alpha fraternity. In 1972, he joined Walmart and was involved in its real-estate dealings. After four years, he moved to the family owned Walton Enterprises as president in 1975.

== Career ==
On September 28, 2005, Walton replaced his deceased brother, John, on the Wal-Mart Board of Directors. He was CEO of his family owned Arvest Bank, until becoming Chairman of Arvest Bank, and chairman of newspaper firm Community Publishers Inc. (CPI) owned by Jim Walton himself (but founded by his father Sam Walton after acquiring the local newspaper the Benton County Daily Record, both operating in Arkansas, Missouri, and Oklahoma). He has pledged about $2 billion to the Walton Family Foundation along with his siblings from 2008 to 2013.

In September 2016, Walton was reported to own over 152 million of Walmart shares worth over $11 billion (US).

== Political activity ==
Walton spent $111,600 in political contributions during the 2008 United States elections, largely in favor of Republicans. He supported the presidential campaign of John McCain. Making Change at Walmart filed a complaint to the Federal Election Commission alleging that Walton violated campaign finance laws by contributing more than the individual legal maximum to candidates during the 2008 election cycle. During the 2012 United States presidential election, Walton initially supported Jon Huntsman in the primary, spending over $102,500 in contributions, before switching his support to Mitt Romney, spending over $202,500 in support of his campaign. From 2015 to 2018, Walton donated $543,800 to two PACs affiliated with the Illinois Network of Charter Schools. In 2024, he donated $500,000 to a group lobbying against the proposed Arkansas Educational Rights Amendment, which would have required private schools that accept public funding in the form of school vouchers to meet the same academic standards as public schools. As of August 2026, Walton spent $10.7 million in support of Republican candidates in the 2026 United States elections.

== Personal life ==
He and his wife, Lynne McNabb Walton, have four children: Alice A. "Annie" Proietti (born November 1979), Steuart Walton (born April 1981), Thomas Layton "Tom" Walton (born September 1983), and James M. Walton (born August 1987). The family resides in Bentonville, Arkansas.

In 2014, he was ranked at #10 on the Forbes list of billionaires with a net worth of $34.7 billion that has increased by $3 billion. On the 2013 Forbes 400 list of the richest people in America he is ranked at #7. As of March 2019, he was ranked as the 16th-richest person in the world, with an estimated net worth of $45.7 billion. As of September 28, 2024, Jim Walton was ranked at #17 on the Bloomberg Billionaires Index with a net worth of $102 billion with a $ YTD change of +$29.8B.

== See also ==
- Walton family
- Walmart
