= Arvest Bank =

American bank

- Type: Private
- Industry: Financial services
- Founded: January 1, 1871; 155 years ago
- Headquarters: Bentonville, Arkansas
- Key people: Jim Walton (Chairman); Matt Machen (President)
- Net income: ▲$0.188 billion (2018)
- Total assets: ▲$18.445 billion (2018)
- Total equity: ▲$2.095 billion (2018)
- Owner: Walton family
- Number of employees: 6,324 (2018)
- Website: www.arvest.com

Arvest Bank is an American bank headquartered in Bentonville, Arkansas, with branches in Arkansas, Kansas, Oklahoma and Missouri. It is the oldest bank in Arkansas and is on the list of largest banks in the United States. It is almost entirely owned by the Walton family. Jim Walton serves as the chairman. The name "Arvest" is a portmanteau of "Arkansas" and "Investment".

In addition to banking, Arvest provides financial services including loans, deposits, treasury management, asset management, wealth management, life insurance, credit cards, title insurance, mortgage loans and mortgage servicing.

== Company history ==
Arvest's charter dates back to McIlroy Bank & Trust, founded in 1871. During the 2008 financial crisis, the bank did not take funds from the Troubled Asset Relief Program.

== Acquisitions ==
In 2003, Arvest acquired Superior Bank based in Little Rock. In December 2009, in a transaction organized by the Federal Deposit Insurance Corporation, the bank acquired SolutionsBank of Overland Park, Kansas, which suffered from bank failure. SolutionsBank had six branches and assets of $511 million. In June 2012, the bank acquired Union Bank. In March 2013, the bank acquired 29 branches in Arkansas, Kansas, Missouri and Oklahoma from Bank of America. In April 2018, the bank acquired Bear State Financial, with 42 branches and $2.2 billion in assets.

== Controversies ==
In June 2010, Blanche Lincoln, a U.S. senator from Arkansas, was accused of pushing for an increase to an asset threshold in a financial regulation bill to benefit Arvest. Lincoln stated that she did not want any bank in Arkansas to be affected by the bill.

In March 2014, Dennis Smiley, the CEO of the Benton County Arvest Bank, resigned as he was being investigated by the FBI for loan fraud. In 2016, he was sentenced to 97 months for obtaining loans wrongfully, coercing subordinates and forging family members' signatures.
