= Alice Walton =

American heiress (born 1949)

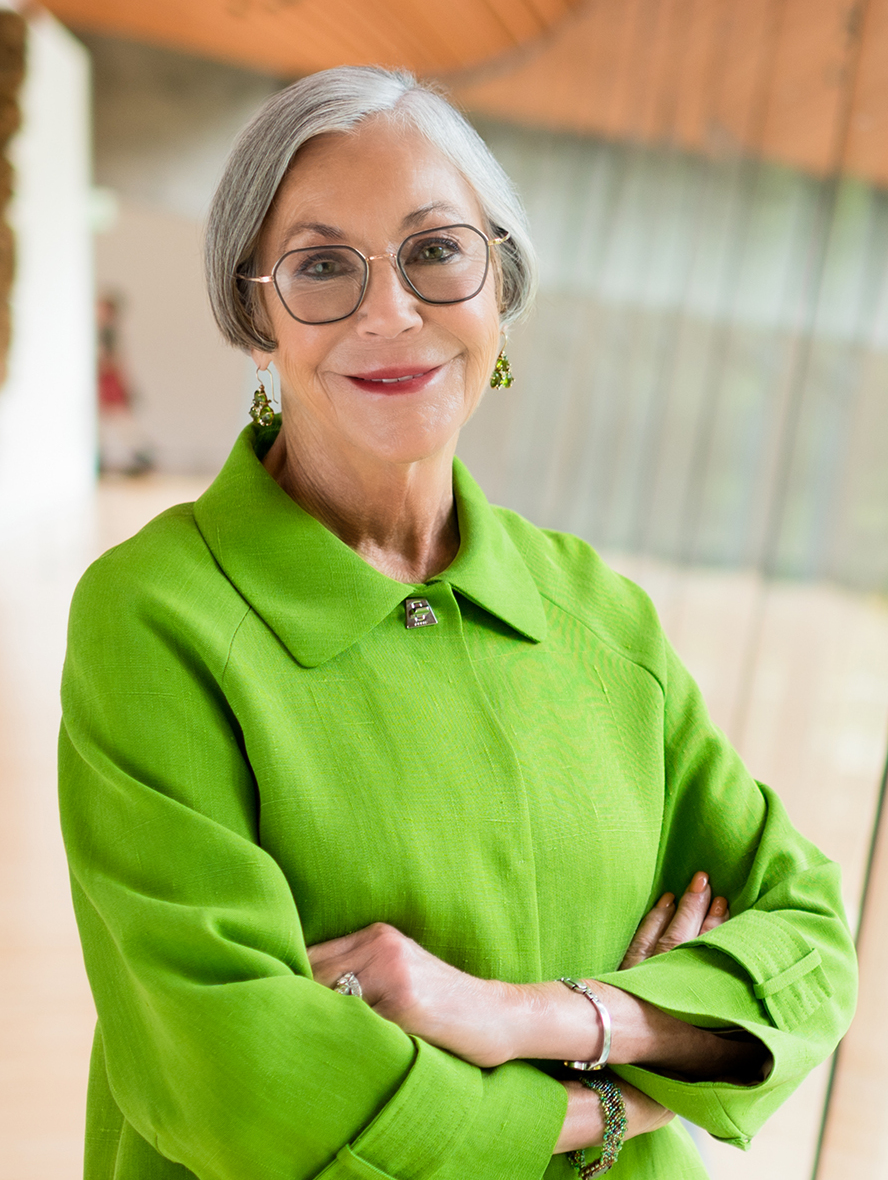
- Walton in 2021
- Born: Alice Louise Walton; October 7, 1949 (age 76); Newport, Arkansas, U.S.
- Education: Trinity University (BA)
- Known for: Heiress, Walton family fortune
- Parents: Sam Walton (father); Helen Walton (mother)
- Relatives: Rob Walton (brother); John Walton (brother); Jim Walton (brother)

Alice Louise Walton (born October 7, 1949) is an American billionaire and heiress to the fortune of Walmart, as she is the daughter of founder Sam Walton. As of September 2026, Walton has an estimated net worth of $134 billion, making her the richest woman in the world and 14th richest person overall, according to the Bloomberg Billionaires Index.

== Early life and education ==
Walton was born in Newport, Arkansas. She was raised along with her three brothers in Bentonville, Arkansas, and graduated from Bentonville High School in 1966. She graduated from Trinity University in San Antonio, Texas, with a B.A. in economics.

== Career ==
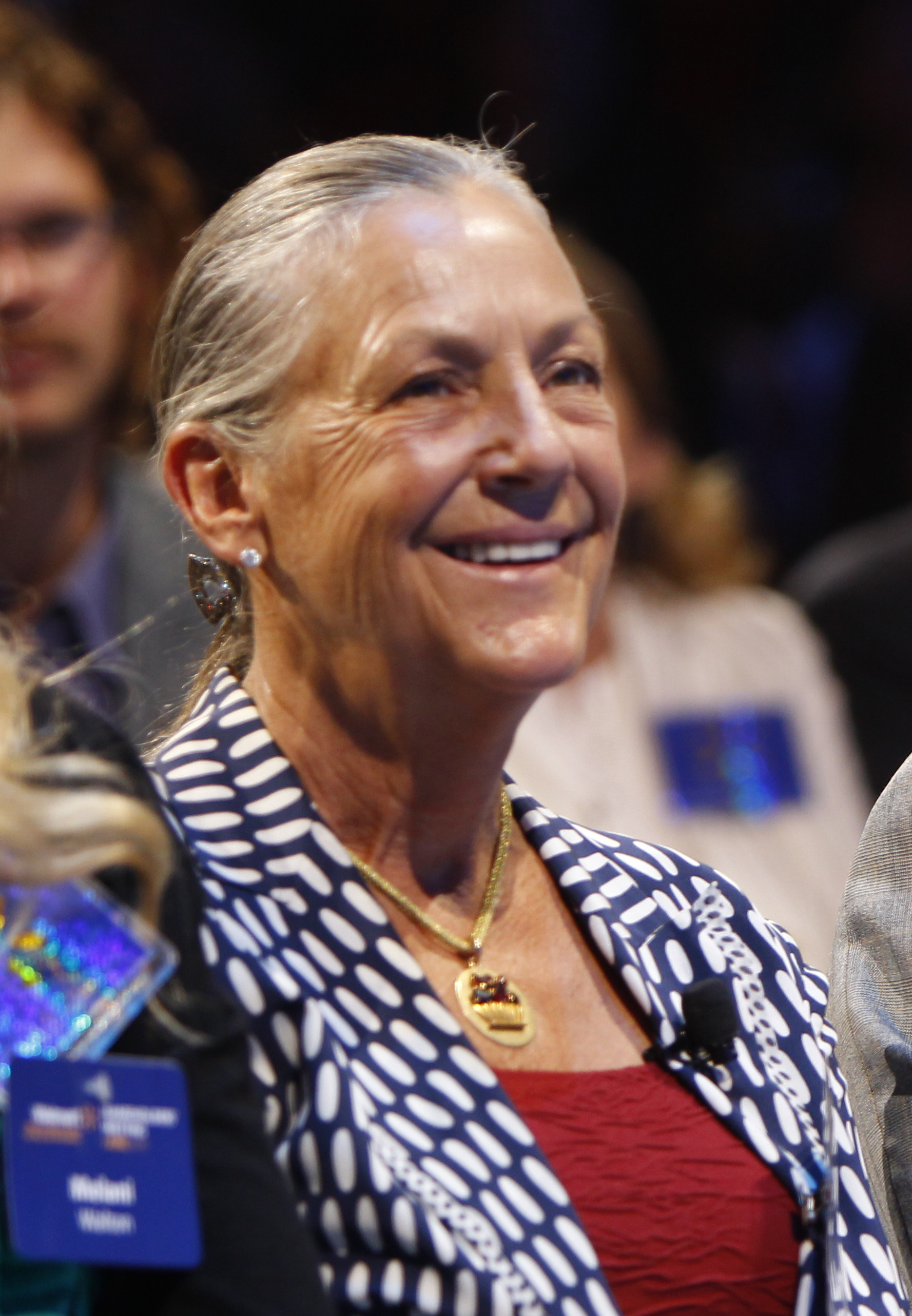
Walton at the 2011 Walmart Shareholders meeting

Early in her career, Walton was an equity analyst and money manager for First Commerce Corporation and headed investment activities at Arvest Bank Group. She was also a broker for EF Hutton. In 1988, Walton founded Llama Company, an investment bank, where she was president, chairwoman, and CEO.

Walton was the first person to chair the Northwest Arkansas Council and played a major role in the development of the Northwest Arkansas Regional Airport, which opened in 1998. At the time, the business and civic leaders of Northwest Arkansas Council found a need for the $109 million regional airport in their corner of the state. Walton provided $15 million in initial funding for construction, and Llama Company underwrote a $79.5 million bond. The Northwest Arkansas Regional Airport Authority recognized Walton's contributions to the creation of the airport and named the terminal the Alice L. Walton Terminal Building. She was inducted into the Arkansas Aviation Hall of Fame in 2001. Llama Company closed in 1998.

== Art ==
Walton and her mother would often paint watercolors on camping trips. The first piece of art Walton purchased was a print of Picasso's Blue Nude when she was ten years old; it cost her 5 weeks allowance. Her first museum quality artwork purchase was of two Winslow Homer watercolors in the late 1980s.

In December 2004, Walton purchased art sold from the collection of Daniel and Rita Fraad at Sotheby's, in New York. In 2005, Walton purchased Asher Brown Durand's celebrated painting, Kindred Spirits, in a sealed-bid auction for a purported US$35 million. The 1849 painting, a tribute to Hudson River School painter Thomas Cole, had been given to the New York Public Library in 1904 by Julia Bryant, the daughter of Romantic poet and New York newspaper publisher William Cullen Bryant, who is depicted in the painting with Cole. She has also purchased works by American painters Winslow Homer and Edward Hopper, as well as a notable portrait of George Washington by Charles Willson Peale, in preparation for the opening of Crystal Bridges. In 2009, Walton acquired Norman Rockwell's "Rosie the Riveter" for $4.9 million.

Walton's attempt to quit smoking inspired her to purchase a painting reminiscent of an earlier painting by John Singer Sargent by Alfred Maurer which depicts a full-length woman smoking.

In a 2011 interview, she spoke about acquiring great works by other artists, including Marsden Hartley and Andrew Wyeth, saying that she loved the emotion and spirituality they expressed. Other artists whose work Walton has purchased include Georgia O'Keeffe, Mark Rothko, Edward Hopper, Kehinde Wiley, and Titus Kaphar.

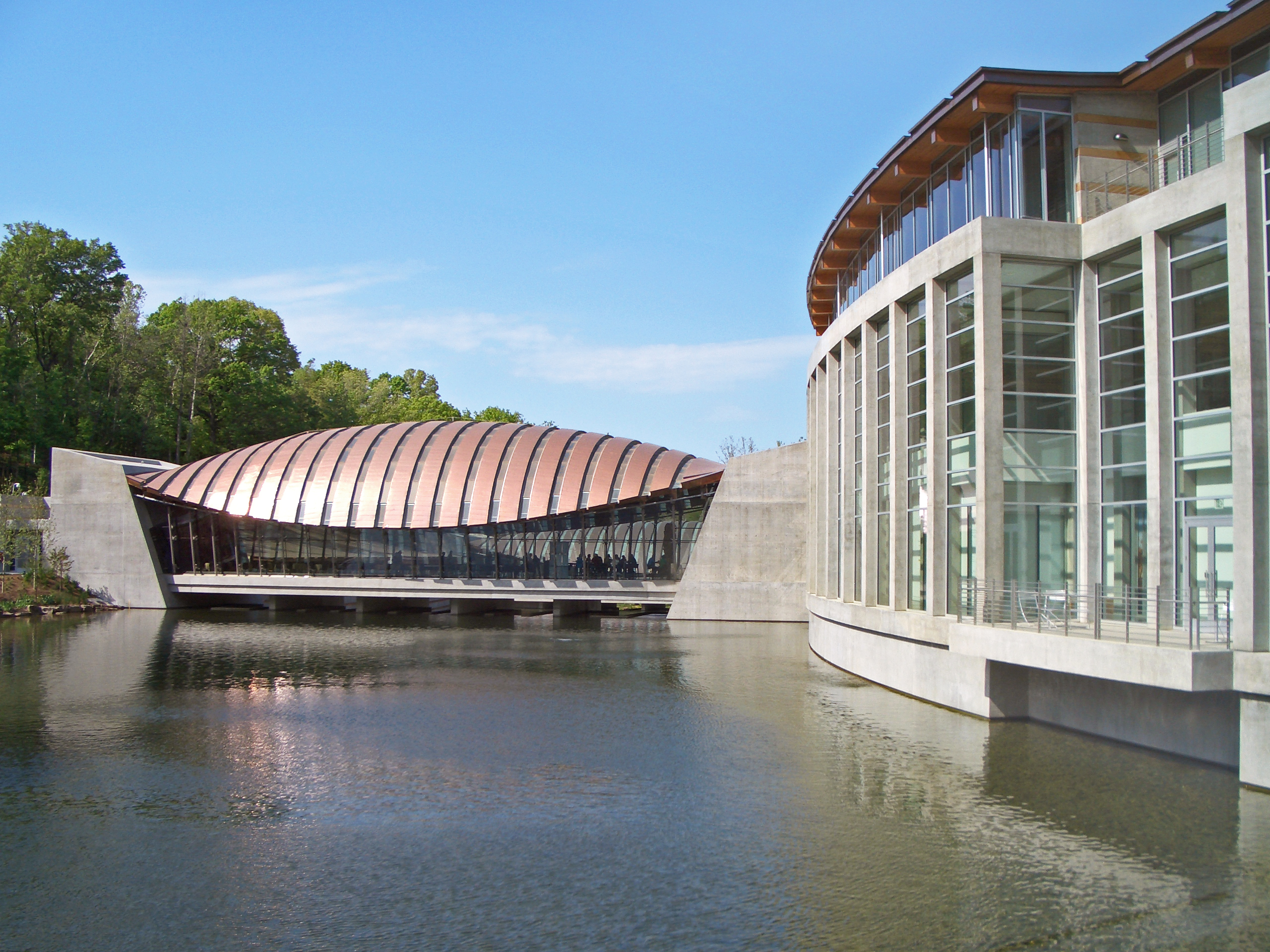
Crystal Bridges Museum of American Art, Bentonville, Arkansas

Walton's interest in art led to the Walton Family Foundation developing the Crystal Bridges Museum of American Art in Bentonville, Arkansas. The architect Moshe Safdie designed the 200,000 square foot museum, which was built on 120 acres of Walton family land. Crystal Bridges opened in 2011 and has been visited more than 5 million times as of 2021. It is free to attend. Walton says her motivation for the museum was to give access to art to people who had never had it.

== Political activity ==
Walton was the 20th-largest individual contributor to 527 committees in the U.S. presidential election 2004, donating US$2.6 million to the conservative Progress for America group. As of January 2012, Walton had contributed $200,000 to Restore Our Future, the super PAC associated with Mitt Romney's presidential campaign. Walton donated $353,400 to the Hillary Victory Fund, a joint fundraising committee supporting Hillary Clinton and other Democrats, in 2016. From 2015 to 2018, Walton donated $1.4 million to two PACs affiliated with the Illinois Network of Charter Schools.

== Philanthropy ==
In 2016, Walton donated $225 million among a total $407 million from Walmart heirs to the Walton Family Holdings Trust, which finances the family's philanthropy.

Walton formed the Alice L. Walton Foundation in 2017. The foundation promotes arts, education, health, and improving economic opportunity. In 2020, the foundation gave the University of Central Arkansas $3 million in funding for its fine arts program. That year, the foundation also gave a $1.28 million grant to the University of Arkansas for Medical Sciences to expand its program to provide healthy food in schools. In 2022, Walton's foundation gave a $3.5 million grant to the Northwest Arkansas Food Bank: $3 million to support construction of a food distribution center, and $500,000 to buy and distribute food.

Also in 2017, Walton formed the Art Bridges Foundation. It partners with small and regional museums with less access to cultural resources. The foundation provides funding, collection loans and traveling exhibits, and creates art programs with museums. Walton has said her goal is to reduce the amount of art kept in storage. As of September 2021, the foundation had approximately 30 exhibits traveling throughout the United States. The Arts Bridges Fellows Program provides opportunities for people from historically underrepresented groups to work with its museum partners. Additionally, Walton has given $10 million to the Crystal Bridges Museum of American Art, and partnered with the Ford Foundation through Art Bridges to fund programs to improve diversity in arts leadership.

=== Healthcare ===
In 2019, Walton established the Whole Health Institute. The institute works with health systems, employers and communities to build and expand access to holistic healthcare. In March 2021, Walton announced that the institute would build a non-profit medical school in Bentonville called the Alice L. Walton School of Medicine. The school will focus on allopathic medicine and graduates will receive a doctor of medicine degree. The campus will be located near Crystal Bridges. Construction began in 2023, with the first class enrolled in 2025. The school held its grand opening ceremony in late 2025.

In 2021, the Alice L. Walton Foundation partnered with the Cleveland Clinic to evaluate health care in Northwest Arkansas. Following that evaluation, in 2022, the foundation and Washington Regional Medical System announced plans to create a non-profit medical system aimed at training doctors in specialty care fields such as oncology, cardiology, and neurology.

== Personal life ==
Walton married a prominent Louisiana investment banker in 1974 at age 24. They were divorced two and a half years later. According to Forbes, she married "the contractor who built her swimming pool" soon after, "but they, too, divorced quickly".

Walton has been involved in multiple automobile accidents, one of them fatal to a pedestrian. She lost control of a rented Jeep during a 1983 Thanksgiving family reunion near Acapulco and plunged into a ravine, shattering her leg. She was airlifted out of Mexico and underwent more than two dozen surgeries; she suffers lingering pain from her injuries. In April 1989, she struck and killed 50-year-old Oleta Hardin, who had stepped onto a road in Fayetteville, Arkansas. No charges were filed. In 1998, she hit a gas meter while driving under the influence of alcohol. She paid a $925 fine.

In 1998, Walton moved to a ranch in Millsap, Texas, named Walton's Rocking W Ranch. An avid horse-lover, she was known for having an eye for determining which 2-month-olds would grow to be champion cutters. Walton listed the farm for sale in 2015 and moved to Fort Worth, Texas, citing the need to focus on the Crystal Bridges Museum of American Art. She moved back to Bentonville in 2020.

== Recognition ==
- Time magazine most influential people in the world, 2012
- Smithsonian Institution's Archives of American Art Medal, 2013
- International Women's Forum hall of fame inductee, 2018
- J. Paul Getty Medal, 2020
