= Helen Walton =

American philanthropist and prominent arts advocate (1919-2007)

- Born: Helen Alice Robson; December 3, 1919; Claremore, Oklahoma, U.S.
- Died: April 19, 2007 (aged 87); Bentonville, Arkansas, U.S.
- Education: University of Oklahoma
- Known for: Walton family fortune
- Spouse: Sam Walton (m. 1943; died 1992)
- Children: Robson; John; Jim; Alice
- Relatives: Lukas Walton (grandson); Sybil Robson Orr (niece)

Helen Alice Robson Walton (née Robson; December 3, 1919 – April 19, 2007) was an American philanthropist and prominent arts advocate, dedicated to being a grandmother and to her community in Bentonville, Arkansas where she instituted a committee for a national museum of arts. After 31 years of activity, the Arkansas Committee on the National Museum for Women in the Arts is the longest standing committee in the state. She was also the wife of Walmart and Sam's Club founder Sam Walton. At one point in her life, she was the richest American and the eleventh-richest woman in the world.

== Biography ==
Helen Alice Robson was born in Claremore, Oklahoma. She was the daughter of homemaker Hazel Carr Robson and a prosperous banker/rancher Leland Stanford "L.S." Robson. She was the valedictorian of her high school class in Claremore, Oklahoma, and a graduate of the University of Oklahoma at Norman with a degree in finance. She married Sam Walton on Valentine's Day, February 14, 1943, in Claremore. They had met in a bowling alley where her dad took her. She once said in a TV interview that upon marrying, they agreed to avoid family squabbling at all costs.

In September 1945, Sam and Helen Walton opened a Ben Franklin "five and dime", their first retail store, in Newport, Arkansas. In 1950, they moved to Bentonville, Arkansas, and in 1962, they opened the first Wal-Mart. Sam Walton credits her for having the idea of the profit-sharing plan with the company's associates.

In 1982, Walton established a children's enrichment center in Bentonville. The center is now called the Helen R. Walton Children's Enrichment Center and has the goal of educating children from 6 weeks old through pre-kindergarten and assisting other child care providers to improve the quality of child care in Arkansas.

When Sam Walton died in 1992, he left his ownership in Wal-Mart to Helen and their four children.

In 2002, as Helen Walton was the president of the Walton Family Foundation, a $300 million donation was made to the University of Arkansas, the biggest donation ever made to a public university in the United States. This donation was preceded by a $50 million donation to the same university's School of Business. Helen also established a scholarship program called the “Walton Scholars,” which helps 150 students annually and helped create a program meant to move students from Central America to the U.S. to learn about democracy and free enterprise.

In the last eight years of her life, Helen suffered from dementia but gained peace painting watercolors. "They're abstract but just lyrical and beautiful," said her daughter Alice in an October 2013 interview with Forbes. "I have two. One's very happy and…oh, whimsical, I guess you would say. Then there's one she did right before she died. I mean, you could almost tell. She knew."

She died of heart failure on April 19, 2007. At the time of her death, she had an estimated net worth of $16.4 billion and owned 8.1% of Wal-Mart. Ms. Walton was survived by her brother, Frank Robson; three children, Samuel Robson Walton, Jim C. Walton, and Alice Louise Walton; eight grandchildren; and four great-grandchildren.

== Involvement in the Arts ==
In 1987, Helen Walton was the leading support and integral figure in the development of the Walton Arts Center in Fayetteville, Arkansas. The construction was completed in 5 years, with the goals of bringing art and artists to the community and educating the younger generations. The Walton Arts Center is one of the most prominent art presenters in the mid-south and one of the few to still perform full-week Broadway productions.

In 1989, Helen Walton, after meeting with Wilhelmina (Billie) Holladay, was inspired to form an Arkansan committee for the National Museum of Women in the Arts or ACNMWA. After discussing their trips to Europe, Walton and Holladay expressed their want to establish a committee that would display the women artists of Arkansas. Texas, Ohio, New York, North Carolina, and Colorado had already held galleries that displayed their women artists by this time. The committee was organized in Little Rock, AR with representatives from 12 demographic districts divided by population; Little Rock was the exception with three representatives. Each representative donated $100 and $2000 was donated by the NMWA to fund an Arkansas Gallery in the NMWA Elisabeth Kasser Wing, the first gallery was exhibited in 1990. Helen was the first acting president of the ACNMWA and from 1990 to 1992 was actively a part of the galleries, what artists would be displayed, who would curate the galleries, the budgets for the events, etc. The committee would prove its dedication to accurately portraying the community, displaying not only the women of Arkansas, but minorities of Arkansas as well. ACNMWA held their first national exhibit in 1992, A Personal Statement: Arkansas Women Artists. In 1991, a museum show was dedicated to children's literature, prominently displaying African-American characters and authors. Since Walton's departure from the committee, the ACNMWA has established the Artist Award, the College Internship, and an Arkansan women artist registry to further encourage involvement and interest in the arts. The ACNMWA is the only branch of the national committee that does state-wide tours of the national exhibits.

== Arms ==
Coat of arms of Helen Walton

Notes
Granted by Conrad Swan, 24th January 1995
Escutcheon
Azure a tau cross triple parted throughout between in chief a dove descending and in base two mullets Argent.
Motto
Laborare Est Orare
