= Walton family =

Family descended from the founders of Walmart

Walton
- Business family
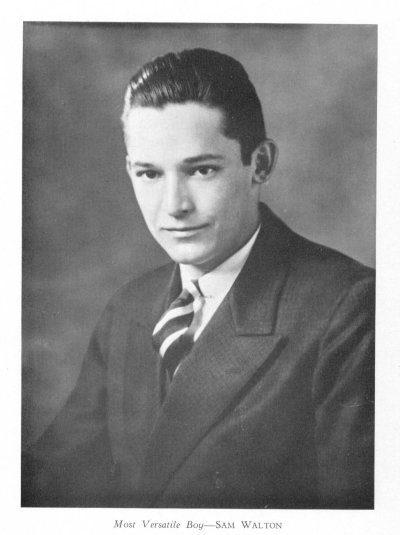
- Sam Walton, founder of Walmart
- Etymology: Walton (surname); for "a place with the suffix tun ('town, farm, hamlet') and one of the prefixes wald ('a wood'), walesc ('foreigner') or walh ('farm worker')"
- Founder: Sam Walton (1918–1992)
- Distinctions: Wealthiest family in the world (US$432 billion; 2024)
- Website: WaltonFamilyFoundation.org

The Walton family is an American family whose collective fortune is derived from Walmart Inc., the largest retailer in the world. As of 2025, the family is the richest family in the world.

== Overview ==
The three most prominent living members (Jim, Rob, and Alice Walton) have consistently been in the top twenty of the Forbes 400 list since 2001, as were John (d. 2005) and Helen (d. 2007) prior to their deaths. Christy Walton took her husband John's place in the ranking after his death. The majority of the family's wealth derives from the heritage of Bud and Sam Walton, who were the co-founders of Walmart. Walmart is the world's largest retailer, one of the world's largest business enterprises in terms of annual revenue, and, with just over 2.2 million employees, the world's largest private employer.

The Walton family's wealth is majority held through the investment holding company Walton Enterprises.

As of December 2014, the Waltons collectively owned 50.8 percent of Walmart. In 2018, the family sold some of their company's stock and now owns just under 50%. In December 2024, the Walton family's net worth was estimated to be US$432.4 billion.

== Walton Family Foundation ==
In 1987, Sam Walton endowed a charitable foundation. The Walton Family Foundation primarily focused on charter schools, but it later extended its program to include environmental issues, particularly water-related.

In 2016, Alice and Jim Walton put a $250 million grant towards building charter school facilities. The Walton Family Foundation created the Building Equity Initiative to provide charter schools with access to capital to create and expand their facilities. This initiative was established after the foundation announced in 2016 that it would spend $1 billion over the next five years to expand "educational opportunity" by partnering with charter school operators, researchers, and education reformers.

== Ownership and Initiatives ==
=== Education ===
The Bentonville Institute of Technology is an upcoming STEM-focused independent university backed by the Walton family and built on the site of Walmart's former home office in Arkansas, which is designed to bridge the gap between education and industry. The university’s curriculum is built around AI, robotics, automation, and entrepreneurship.

=== Sports ===
Walton family owns NBA's Denver Nuggets, the NHL's Colorado Avalanche and NFL's Denver Broncos.

=== Others ===
The superyacht Kaos.

Walton family owns $300 million superyacht Kaos, once owned by the Emir of Qatar.

== Walton family fortune ==
The Walton family fortune is broken down as such, as of February 2025:

- Jim Walton, $117.7 billion
- S. Robson Walton, $119 billion
- Alice Walton, $109.8 billion
- Lukas Walton, $40.9 billion
- Christy Walton, $19.9 billion
- Nancy Walton Laurie, $16.1 billion
- Ann Walton Kroenke, $13.4 billion

== Family tree ==
Walton family tree

Samuel Robson (Rob) Walton (b. October 27, 1944)
three children
Carolyn Funk (divorced)
John Thomas Walton (8 October 1946–27 June 2005)
Lukas Walton (b. September 19, 1986)
Samuel Moore (Sam) Walton (29 March 1918–5 April 1992)	Christy Walton
Helen Robson Kemper (3 December 1919–19 April 2007)	Alice Louise Walton (b. October 7, 1949)
unknown (divorced)
James Carr (Jim) Walton (b. 1948)
four children
Lynne McNabb
Ann Walton Kroenke (b. October 7, 1949)
Josh Kroenke
James Lawrence ("Bud") Walton (20 December 1921–21 March 1995)
Whitney Ann Kroenke
Audrey Walton	E. Stanley Kroenke
Nancy Walton Laurie (b. May 15, 1951)
Elizabeth Paige Laurie
Bill Laurie

Notes:

Their immediate family includes Jim, Christy, and Lukas Walton.
