= 2026 South by Southwest Film & TV Festival =

Edition of film and television festival

South by Southwest
- Opening film: I Love Boosters
- Location: Austin, Texas, U.S.
- Founded: 1987
- Hosted by: SXSW, LLC.
- Festival date: March 12–18, 2026
- Language: English
- Website: www.sxsw.com
- 2027 2025

The 2026 South by Southwest Film & TV Festival took place from March 12–18 at several venues in Austin, Texas, as part of the larger South by Southwest annual event. The festival opened with the film I Love Boosters.

== Feature films ==
=== Headliner ===
English title	Director(s)	Production country
I Love Boosters	Boots Riley	United States
Mike & Nick & Nick & Alice	BenDavid Grabinski	United States
Over Your Dead Body	Jorma Taccone	United States
Pretty Lethal	Vicky Jewson	United Kingdom, United States
Ready or Not 2: Here I Come	Matt Bettinelli-Olpin and Tyler Gillett	United States
They Will Kill You	Kirill Sokolov	United States

=== Narrative Feature Competition ===
English title	Director(s)	Production country
Brian	Will Ropp	United States
Edie Arnold Is a Loser	Megan Rico and Kade Atwood	United States
Mallory's Ghost	Arabella Oz	United States
Plantman & Blondie: A Dress Up Gang Film	Robb Boardman	United States
Seahorse	Aisha Evelyna	Canada
Sender	Russell Goldman	United States
The Snake	Jenna MacMillan	Canada
Wishful Thinking	Graham Parkes	United States

=== Documentary Feature Competition ===
English title	Director(s)	Production country
The Ascent	Edward John Drake, Scott Veltri, and Francis Cronin	United States
The Last Critic	Matty Wishnow	United States
The Life We Leave	JJ Gerber	United States
My NDA	Juliane Dressner and Miriam Shor	United States
Phoenix Jones: The Rise and Fall of a Real Life Superhero	Bayan Joonam	United States
Stormbound	Miko Lim	United States
Summer 2000: The X-Cetra Story	Ayden Mayeri	United States
#WhileBlack	Sidney Fussell and Jennifer Holness	Canada, United States

=== Narrative Spotlight ===
English title	Director(s)	Production country
Anima	Brian Tetsuro Ivie	United States
Basic	Chelsea Devantez	United States
Beast Race	Ernesto Solis Rodrigo Pesavento, and Fernando Meirelles	Brazil
Campeón Gabacho	Jonás Cuarón	Mexico
Chili Finger	Edd Benda and Stephen Helstad	United States
Crash Land	Dempsey Bryk	Canada
Dead Deer High	Jo Rochelle	United States
Downbeat	Danny Madden	United States
DreamQuil	Alex Prager	United Kingdom, United States
Family Movie	Kyra Sedgwick and Kevin Bacon	United States
Forbidden Fruits	Meredith Alloway	United States
The Fox	Dario Russo	Australia
He Bled Neon	Drew Kirsch	United States
Kill Me	Peter Warren	United States
Love Language	Joey Power	United States
Mam	Nan Feix	France
Normal	Ben Wheatley	United States, Canada
Pizza Movie	Brian McElhaney and Nick Kocher	United States
Poetic License	Maude Apatow	United States
Power Ballad	John Carney	United States, Ireland
A Safe Distance	Gloria Mercer	Canada
Same Same but Different	Lauren Noll	United States
The Saviors	Kevin Hamedani	United States
Seekers of Infinite Love	Victoria Strouse	United States
Sparks	Fergus Campbell	United States
The Sun Never Sets	Joe Swanberg	United States
Their Town	Katie Aselton	United States
Ugly Cry	Emily Robinson	United States

=== Documentary Spotlight ===
English title	Director(s)	Production country
Adam's Apple	Amy Jenkins	United States
Amazing Live Sea Monkeys	Mark Becker	United States
Baby/Girls	Alyse Walsh and Jackie Jesko	United States
Black Zombie	Maya Annik Bedward	Canada
My Brother's Killer	Rachel Mason	United States
Capturing Bigfoot	Marq Evans	United States
Ceremony	Banchi Hanuse	Canada
Cornbread Mafia	Evan Mascagni and Drew Morris	United States
The Dads	Luchina Fisher	United States
Drift	Deon Taylor	United States
First They Came for My College	Patrick Bresnan	United States
I Got Bombed at Harvey's	Amy Bandlien Storkel and Bryan Storkel	United States
Manhood	Daniel Lombroso	United States
One Another	Amber Love	United States
Serling	Jonah Tulis	United States
Summer of '94	Dave LaMattina and Chad N. Walker	United States
#Skyking	Patricia Gillespie	United States
The Truth and Tragedy of Moriah Wilson	Marina Zenovich	United States
The Way We Move	Vanessa Dumont and Nicolas Davenel	United States
Your Attention Please	Sara Robin	United States

=== Midnighter ===
English title	Director(s)	Production country
American Dollhouse	John Valley	United States
Drag	Raviv Ullman and Greg Yagolnitzer	United States
Fifteen	Jack Zagha and Yossy Zagha	Argentina, Mexico
Grind	Brea Grant, Ed Dougherty, and Chelsea Stardust	United States
Hokum	Damian McCarthy	United States, Ireland
Imposters	Caleb J. Phillips	United States
Monitor	Matt Black and Ryan Polly	United States
Never After Dark	Dave Boyle	United States

=== Festival Favorite ===
English title	Director(s)	Production country
The AI Doc: Or How I Became an Apocaloptimist	Daniel Roher and Charlie Tyrell	United States
American Doctor	Poh Si Teng	United States, State of Palestine, Malaysia, Qatar
Big Girls Don't Cry	Paloma Schneideman	New Zealand
Buddy	Casper Kelly	United States
Chasing Summer	Josephine Decker	United States
Cookie Queens	Alysa Nahmias	United States
Erupcja	Pete Ohs	United States, Poland
Joybubbles	Rachael J. Morrison	United States
Leviticus	Adrian Chiarella	Australia
Obsession	Curry Barker	United States
The Oldest Person in the World	Sam Green	United States
Paralyzed by Hope: The Maria Bamford Story	Judd Apatow and Neil Berkeley	United States
See You When I See You	Jay Duplass	United States
Idiots	Macon Blair	United States
Rock Springs	Vera Miao	United States, Canada
Time and Water	Sara Dosa	United States, Iceland

=== Visions ===
English title	Director(s)	Production country
And Her Body Was Never Found	Polaris Banks	United States
Bagworm	Oliver Bernsen	United States
Beyond The Duplex Planet	Beth Harrington	United States
Daughters of the Forest: Mycelium Chronicles	Otilia Portillo Padua	Mexico
Dead Eyes	Richard E. Williams	Australia
Perfect	Millicent Hailes	United States
Sinner Supper Club	Daisy Rosato and Nora Kaye	United States
The Peril at Pincer Point	Jake Kuhn and Noah Stratton-Twine	United Kingdom

=== 24 Beats Per Second ===
English title	Director(s)	Production country
Agridulce (Bittersweet)	Frank Pavich	United States, Dominican Republic
A Cowboy in London	Jared L. Christopher	United States
Jack Johnson: SURFILMUSIC	Emmett Malloy	United States
Lainey Wilson: Keepin' Country Cool	Amy Scott	United States
Los Lobos Native Sons	Doug Blush and Piero F. Giunti	United States
The Man with the Big Hat	Austin Sayre	United States
Mile End Kicks	Chandler Levack	Canada
Noah Kahan: Out of Body	Nick Sweeney	United States
The Rise of the Red Hot Chili Peppers: Our Brother, Hillel	Ben Feldman	United States
Stages	Ryan Booth	United States
We Are The Shaggs	Ken Kwapis	United States

=== Global ===
English title	Director(s)	Production country
Apolo	Isis Broken and Tainá Müller	Brazil
Do You Love Me	Lana Daher	Lebanon
Mickey	Dano García	Mexico
Scarlet Girls	Paula Cury	Dominican Republic, Germany, Mexico
Thanks for Nothing	Stella Marie Markert	Germany

== Short films ==
=== Narrative Short Competition ===
English title	Director(s)	Production country
Achiever	Charlie Traisman	United States
Best Friends with the Devil	Hugo de Sousa	United States
Buah	Jen Nee Lim	Singapore
Can I Put You On Hold	James Cutler	United States
Copy, Save	Alyssa Loh	United States
Dua Ji	YuHan Tsai	United States
Gamberra	Marine Auclair March	Spain
Gender Studies	Jamie Kiernan O'Brien	United States
I Saw You In The Flood	Kevin Xian Ming Yu	United States
Imago	Ariel Zengotita	United States
Marga en el DF	Gabriela Ortega	United States
A Shot at Art	Ilke Paddenburg	Netherlands
Souvenir	Renée Marie Petropoulos	Australia
Stairs	Riley Donigan	United States
Supper	Savannah Braswell	United States
Talk Me	Joecar Hanna	United States
Them That's Not	Mekhai Lee	United States
Visitors	Minnie Schedeen	United States
Vomit	Roi Cydulkin	United States
We Were Here	Pranav Bhasin	India

=== Documentary Short Competition ===
English title	Director(s)	Production country
Air Horse One	Lasse Linder	Belgium, Switzerland
Divorce Resort	Coby Becker	United States
Eructation	Victoria Trow	United States
Glacier's Requiem	Saddiq Abubakar	United Kingdom
He's Out There	Kurt Andrew Schneider	United States
How To Catch A Butterfly	Kiriko Mechanicus	Netherlands
I Got My Brother	Victor K. Gabriel	United States
In the Morning Sun	Serville Poblete	Canada, Philippines
A New Inferno	Nita Blum-Reddick and Jonathan Pickett	United States
Not Scared, Just Sad	Isabelle Mecattaf	Bulgaria, Lebanon
A Wolf in the Suburbs	Amélie Hardy	Canada
Yiyíists'ą́ą́' (Listen)	Malakye Zaayin Tsosie	United States

=== Animated Short Competition ===
English title	Director(s)	Production country
Hag	Anna Ginsburg	United Kingdom
Im Auto Tapes und Butterbrot	Kiana Naghshineh	Germany
In The Beginning	Ala Nunu	Poland, Portugal, Spain
Paper Trail	Don Hertzfeldt	United States
Praying Mantis	Joe Hsieh	Taiwan
Tell Me When You Get Home	Tshay	United States
What We Leave Behind	Jean-Sébastien Hamel, Alexandra Myotte	Canada

=== Midnight Short Competition ===
English title	Director(s)	Production country
Jealous People Are Ugly People	Theo James Krekis	United Kingdom
Man Eating Pussy	Emily Lawson	United States
Mantis Stream! Like & Subscribe	Lincoln Robisch and Sarah Maerten	United States
The Seeing Eye Dog Who Saw Too Much	Eric Jackowitz	United States
A Stable Marriage	Josephine Decker	United States
Tongue	Lim Da Seul	South Korea
Wax	Alexandre Forgues	Canada

=== Texas Short Competition ===
English title	Director(s)	Production country
Forcefield of Love	Liz Moskowitz	United States
Freedom At Stake	Raeshem Nijhon and Stacey Young	United States
A Fragile Vessel	Samuel Díaz Fernández	United States
Shut The Fuck Up When We Speak	Ryan Darbonne	United States
Stalin Boys	Ora DeKornfeld and Bianca Giaever	United States
Winter Ceremony	Sidi Wang	United States

== Television ==
=== TV Premiere ===
English title	Created by	Production country
The Audacity	Jonathan Glatzer	United States
The Dark Wizard	Peter Mortimer and Nick Rosen	United States
Margo's Got Money Troubles	David E. Kelley	United States
Monsters of God	Jeremy McBride	United States

=== TV Spotlight ===
English title	Created by	Production country
The Comeback	Lisa Kudrow and Michael Patrick King	United States
They Called Us Outlaws - The Cosmic Cowboys, Honky Tonk Heroes and Rise of Redneck Rock	Eric Geadelmann and Kelly Magelky	United States
Woodstockers	Corbin Bernsen	United States

=== Independent TV Competition ===
English title	Created by	Production country
Are We Still Married?	Kit Steinkellner	United States
Birth is For P*ssies	Hannah Shealy	United States
Codependent	Wade McElhaney and Weston McElhaney	United States
Cold Call	Emma Lenderman and Elise Kibler	United States
In My Blood	Alex Bendo	United States
Son of a Bikram	Ash T and Johnny Rey Diaz	United States
