= Tribeca Films =

American film distribution company

- Industry: Motion pictures
- Founded: 2010
- Headquarters: New York City, U.S.
- Key people: Nick Savva; Jane Rosenthal; Robert De Niro; Craig Hatkoff
- Services: Digital Distribution
- Parent: Tribeca Enterprises, Giant Pictures
- Website: Tribeca Films

Tribeca Films is an American independent film distribution label which focuses on acquiring prestige independent films from the top international film festivals to distribute on streaming platforms for wider audiences. Additionally, Tribeca Films is presented as a label under Giant Pictures, which also owns Drafthouse Films.

== History ==
The Tribeca Films began as an independent film distribution TVOD initiative in the in 2010, which expanded in 2014 with an SVOD service. They established themselves as a prestige distributor with critically praised titles like Tony Kaye's Detachment with Adrien Brody and Gia Coppola's debut Palo Alto with Emma Roberts. Tribeca Films is a separate distribution label from the film the production company TriBeCa Productions founded by Robert De Niro and producer Jane Rosenthal.

The label however was formally revitalized and relaunched in January 2024, with a focus of acquiring and distributing new and incisive works from filmmakers who premiered at festivals like Cannes, Venice, Sundance, Berline and TIFF.

The label was created to continue the New York spirit legacy of the Tribeca Film Festival and Tribeca Enterprises. Tribeca co-founder and CEO Jane Rosenthal stated “The Tribeca Festival has always...championed emerging filmmakers by providing a global platform to showcase their projects. As the film industry evolves, we recognize the need to better support independent filmmakers in today’s crowded streaming and distribution market." The goal of the Tribeca Films label would be to spotlight high quality independent films and give them life beyond the festival circuit.

Giant Pictures had been the distribution and technology partner of the Tribeca Festival for several years when they decided to partner on the label. Giant Pictures GM Nick Savva, stated “with deals for specialized films harder to come by, this is a great time for Tribeca to re-enter U.S. distribution.”

Tribeca Films is focused on distribution to streaming platforms including AppleTV, Prime Video, Netflix, Tubi and Peacock. They also have a first-of-their-kind education based output agreement for public libraries and universities via a multi-year partnership with streaming services Kanopy and Kinema. On the deal, Jane Rosenthal said "wider audiences" would be able "to discover and watch festival favorites using a library card"

== Content ==
=== Select filmography ===
Title	Director	Release
The Wild and Wonderful Whites of West Virginia	Julien Nitzberg	2010
My Awkward Sexual Adventure	Sean Garrity	2012
Detachment	Tony Kaye	2012
Palo Alto	Gia Coppola	2013
Listen Up Philip	Alex Ross Perry	2014
Nas: Time Is Illmatic	One9	2014
I Am Big Bird: The Caroll Spinney Story	Dave LaMattina, Chad N. Walker	2014
In Her Name	Sarah Carter	2022
Nude Tuesday	Armağan Ballantyne	2022
Good Girl Jane	Sarah Elizabeth Mintz	2022
Suze	Dane Clark, Linsey Stewart	2023
A Bronx Tale (30th Anniversary Edition)	Robert De Niro	2023
Phantom Parrot	Kate Stonehill	2024
Graduates	Hannah Peterson	2024
Tendaberry	Haley Elizabeth Anderson	2024
Egghead & Twinkie	Sarah Kambe Holland	2024
The Featherweight	Robert Kolodny	2024
