= Summer of '94 =

- Directed by: Dave LaMattina; Chad N. Walker
- Produced by: Christopher Leggett; Rafael Marmor; Marc Gilbar; Dave LaMattina; Chad N. Walker
- Edited by: Billy McMillin
- Music by: Ryan "Bullet" Shields
- Release date: March 14, 2026 (SXSW)
- Country: United States
- Language: English

Summer of '94 is a sports documentary film directed by Dave LaMattina and Chad N. Walker documenting the United States men's national soccer team from its team selection, training, through the 1994 FIFA World Cup.

== Release ==
The film had its premier at the 2026 South by Southwest Film & TV Festival on March 14, 2026.

== Reception ==
The Hollywood Reporter called it inspiring, but a bit generic. UK Film Review called it a good build up to the 2026 FIFA World Cup.
