= Liturgy of Anti-Tank Obstacles =

2022 documentary film

- Directed by: Dmytro Sukholytkyy-Sobchuk
- Screenplay by: Dmytro Sukholytkyy-Sobchuk
- Produced by: Daniel Lombroso
- Starring: Roman Sova; Serhiy Danko; Andriy Holdiy
- Cinematography: Dmytro Sukholytkyy-Sobchuk; Andriy Lesetskiy; Kostyantyn Klyatskin; Denys VorontsovDenys Tokarev
- Production companies: Babylon'13; Mellivora Production
- Distributed by: Contemporary Ukrainian Cinema
- Release date: 2022
- Running time: 12 minutes
- Countries: United States; Ukraine
- Language: Ukrainian

Liturgy of Anti-Tank Obstacles (Ukrainian: «Літургія протитанкових перешкод», romanized: Liturgiia protytankovyh pereshkod) is a 2022 US-Ukrainian 12-minute experimental documentary film directed by Dmytro Sukholytkyy-Sobchuk, about Ukrainians who temporarily changed their profession to be useful in Ukraine's war with Russia. The return to documentary filmmaking for the director was an act of service to the state, creating counterarguments for the perspective.

The film was funded by one of world's biggest media, The New Yorker, which holds the copyright both in Ukraine, and on the international market.

World premiere took place at the Sarajevo Film Festival on August 13, 2022 – the film opened the documentary program of the festival. Following this, the film participated in over 100 international film festivals, among them International Documentary Film Festival Amsterdam (IDFA), Toronto International Film Festival, American's Sundance Film Festival, Doc NYC, New York's documentary festival, Clermont-Ferrand International Short Film Festival.

== Plot ==
The film takes place in the workshops where sculptors are producing anti-tank obstacles. Silent figures of prominent Ukrainian figures, angels, cossacks, and numerous copies of a sculpture of Jesus, similar to the Terracotta Army, as if frozen in the expectation of new creations. The artists are welding the metal defenses for the Armed Forces of Ukraine.

== Starring ==
- Roman Sova
- Serhiy Danko
- Andriy Holdiy

== Team ==
- Director – Dmytro Sukholytkyy-Sobchuk
- Screenplay – Dmytro Sukholytkyy-Sobchuk
- Producer – Daniel Lombroso
- Executive Producer – Paul Moakley Soo-Jeong Kang
- Supervising Producer – Melissa Fajardo
- Line producers – Dmytro Sukholytkyy-Sobchuk, Oleksandra Sorokhan
- Cinematography – Dmytro Sukholytkyy-Sobchuk, Andriy Lesetskiy, Kostyantyn Klyatskin, Denys Vorontsov, Denys Tokarev
- Editing – Serhiy Klepach
- Music – Artos choir (conductor – Natalia Ivashkiv)
- Sound design – Maria Nesterenko
- Production – The New Yorker

== Filming process ==
During the full-scale invasion, director Dmytro Suholytkyi-Sobchuk worked as a volunteer in Lviv, while continuing to film for the Babylon'13 project, with which he had worked together since the time of the Revolution of Dignity. Among other stories, he learned about sculptors who create anti-tank obstacles in their workshop according to all the requirements of the Armed Forces of Ukraine. He visited them to take a few photos and shoot a small video for Babylon'13. Then, on the recommendation of Daria Bassel (DocuDays UA) he filled out the application form, as it turned out later, for a competition from one of the most popular world publications, The New Yorker, in support of the Ukrainian project.

The filming took a month and a half, during which it was necessary to film the production process of anti-tank structures, their final destination, and how they work. The work took place in the room where the masters put together elements of the Stations of the Cross for several villages, consisting of 13 stations (stops on the Stations of the Cross, depicting scenes from the life of Jesus). The total number was 39, located in the workshop at the same time, like the Terracotta Army, the model of which was a starting point for the director.

The sound basis of the film is radio – built from fragments of radio broadcasts, which, with constant news from the frontlines, have become an integral part of Ukrainians. News is heard of the battles for Azovstal. News messages are built into the film's soundtrack, similar to a liturgical service led by a priest. Liturgy of Anti-Tank Obstacles was built according to the structure of the Easter liturgy, in which Jesus defeats death.

The watercolor poster for the film was created by Andrii Sakun together with Anna Alpatieva.

== Festival life ==
World premiere took place in Sarajevo. The film by Sukholytkyy-Sobchuk was one of the six works to represent Ukraine at the 28th Sarajevo Film Festival in Bosnia and Herzegovina. Liturgy of Anti-Tank Obstacles opened the documentary program of the festival on August 13, 2022.

The media covering film festivals spoke of the work as of a powerful documentary examining the current situation in Ukraine, noting that without delivering an obvious message, the film brings home the indomitability and the ingenuity of the Ukrainian resistance.

== Awards and nominations ==
List of awards and nominations
| Date of ceremony | Country | Award | Category | Nominee(s) | Result | Ref. |
|---|---|---|---|---|---|---|
| 2022 | Netherlands | Pure Magic International Film Festival | Best Documentary Short | Dmytro Sukholytkyy-Sobchuk | Won | |
| 2022 | Australia | Brisbane International Film Festival | Best International Short Film – In Competition (SHORTS: DOCUMENTARIES) | Dmytro Sukholytkyy-Sobchuk | Won | |
| 2022 | United States | Doc NYC, New York's documentary festival | Short Film Awards / Special Mention | Dmytro Sukholytkyy-Sobchuk | Won | |
| 2022 | Hungary | Faludi International Film Festival And Photo Competition | Documentary Film Category | Dmytro Sukholytkyy-Sobchuk | 2nd place | |
| 2023 | Hungary | Budapest Independent Film Festival | Best Documentary Short | Dmytro Sukholytkyy-Sobchuk | Won | |
| 2023 | India | Jammu Film Festival | Best Documentary | Dmytro Sukholytkyy-Sobchuk | Won | |
| 2023 | Austria | Intuition Earth Film Festival | Best Documentary Short | Dmytro Sukholytkyy-Sobchuk | Won | |
| 2023 | Japan | Meihodo International Youth Visual Media Festival | Documentary Film – Gold Award | Dmytro Sukholytkyy-Sobchuk | Won | |
| 2023 | Spain | Huesca International Film Festival | «Concurso Documental» competition. (qualify for Oscar) | Dmytro Sukholytkyy-Sobchuk | Won | |
| 2023 | Greece | Santorini Film Festival | Best Short Documentary | Dmytro Sukholytkyy-Sobchuk | Won | |
| 2023 | United States | LA Documentary Film Festival | Best Short Form Short Film | Dmytro Sukholytkyy-Sobchuk | Won | |
| 2023 | Turkey | Andromeda Film Festival | Da Vinci Special Section | Dmytro Sukholytkyy-Sobchuk | Won | |
| 2023 | Turkey | Andromeda Film Festival | Jury Special Award | Dmytro Sukholytkyy-Sobchuk | Won | |
| 2023 | Turkey | Andromeda Film Festival | Best Poster | Sakun, Anna Alpatieva | Won | |
| 2023 | United States | Florida Shorts | International Documentary | Dmytro Sukholytkyy-Sobchuk | Won | |
| 2023 | Ukraine | Ukrainian International Film Festival «BRUKIVKA» | Best film in the National Competition by the Union of the Ukrainian Film Critics | Dmytro Sukholytkyy-Sobchuk | Won | |
| 2023 | Ukraine | Ukrainian International Film Festival «BRUKIVKA» | Special jury mention of the National Competition: «For seeing beauty in details in the most tragic times, for faith and hope!» | Dmytro Sukholytkyy-Sobchuk | Won | |
| 2023 | Portugal | Ciudad del Este Independent Film Festival | Best Documentary Short Film | Dmytro Sukholytkyy-Sobchuk | Won | |
| 2023 | United States | Nashville Film Festival | Best Documentary Short (qualify for Oscar) | Dmytro Sukholytkyy-Sobchuk | Won | |
| 2023 | Italy | Ardesio Film Festival «Sacrae Scenae» | Special Mention | Dmytro Sukholytkyy-Sobchuk | Won | |

== Participation in festivals ==
- 2022
  - Aug 12 – 19 – Sarajevo International Film Festival (Bosnia and Herzegovina) – opening film of the documentary program
  - Sep 8 – 18 – Toronto International Film Festival (Canada)
  - Sep 22 – 23 – EDUKINO Festival of Films Against War (Poland)
  - Sep 29 – Oct 8 – Filmfest Hamburg (Germany)
  - Oct 1 – 2 – Louth International Film Festival (Ireland)
  - Oct 5 – 8 – AZYL Shorts – International Short Film Festival (Slovakia)
  - Oct 5 – 16 – Montreal Festival du nouveau cinéma (Canada)
  - Oct 6 – 16 – Doclisboa International Film Festival (Portugal)
  - Oct 6 – 23 – Central and Eastern European Film Festival (Luxembourg)
  - Oct 12 – 16 – FECIS – Salto Independent Film Festival (Uruguay)
  - Oct 13 – 23 – Riga International Film Festival (Latvia)
  - Oct 17 – 23 – Festival International du Film de La Roche-sur-Yon (France)
  - Oct 26 – 30 – Ukrainian Film Festival Berlin (Germany)
  - Oct 27 – 28 – Abitibi-Témiscamingue International Film Festival (Canada)
  - Nov 9 – 20 – International Documentary Filmfestival Amsterdam (Netherlands)
  - Nov 11 – 13 – Docudays UA – International Documentary Human Rights Film Festival (Ukraine)
  - Nov 11 – 15 – Black Cat Award International Film Festival (Bolivia)
  - Nov 11 – 18 – ZINEBI64 – International Festival of Documentary and Short Film of Bilbao (Spain)
  - Nov 17 – 22 – Kyiv International Short Film Festival (Ukraine)
  - Nov 19 – 23 – International Erzincan Short Film Festival (Turkey)
  - Nov 23 – 25 – Mriya International Film Festival (Belgium)
  - Nov 23 – 27 – Ekurhuleni International Film Festival-EIFF 22 (South Africa)
  - Dec 1 – 7 – Molodist Kyiv Film Festival (Ukraine)
  - Dec 7 – 11 – ŻUBROFFKA International Short Film Festival Białystok (Poland)
  - Dec 14 – 17 – Intima Lente Film Festival (Italy)
  - Dec 15 – 18 – Wiz-Art Film Festival (Ukraine)
- 2023
  - Jan 18 – 24 – Vilnius International Short Film Festival (Latvia)
  - Jan 19 – 29 – Sundance Film Festival (UT, United States)
  - Jan 20 – 28 – FIPADOC (France)
  - Jan 20 – 29 – Flickerfest International Short Film Festival (Australia)
  - Jan 21 – 28 – Trieste Film Festival (Italy)
  - Jan 27 – Feb 4 – Clermont-Ferrand International Short Film Festival (France)
  - Feb 17 – 26 – Big Sky Documentary Film Festival (MT, United States)
  - Feb 24 – Melbourne Short Film Festival (Australia)
  - Feb 28 – Mar 4 – Film O’Clock International Festival (Ukraine)
  - Mar 2 – 12 – Thessaloniki Documentary Festival (Greece)
  - Mar 10 – 11 – Mile High Human & Civil Rights Pop-Up Film Festival (CO, United States)
  - Mar 15 – 19 – International Film Festival Febiofest Bratislava (Slovakia)
  - Mar 17 – 26 – Fribourg International Film Festival (Switzerland)
  - Mar 22 – 26 – Glasgow Short Film Festival (United Kingdom)
  - Mar 22 – 26 – Sonoma International Film Festival (CA, United States)
  - Mar 24 – Apr 1 – Movies That Matter Film Festival (Netherlands)
  - Mar 27 – Apr 1 – Music & Cinema – Festival International du Film à Marseille (France)
  - Mar 29 – Apr 2 – ACT Human Rights Film Festival (CO, United States)
  - Mar 30 – Apr 10 – Hong Kong International Film Festival (Hong Kong)
  - Apr 26 – 30 – Freep Film Festival (MI, United States)
  - May 11 – 14 – Short Encounters International Film Festival (Greece)
  - May 26 – 28 – Pune Short Film Festival (India)
  - Jun 1 – 7 – Friss Hús Budapest International Short Film Festival (Hungary)
  - Jun 6 – 26 – Short Shorts Film Festival & Asia (Japan)
  - Jun 7 – 10 – Adriatic Film Festival (Italy)
  - Jun 7 – 11 – The Norwegian Short Film Festival (Norway)
  - Jun 20 – 26 – Palm Springs International Festival of Short Films (CA, United States)
  - Jun 23 – 25 – Nevada City Film Festival (CA, United States)
  - Jun 23 – 25 – EuropeNow Film Festival (United Kingdom)
  - Jun – Huesca International Film Festival (Spain)
  - Jul 2 – 8 – Freedom Film Festival (Poland)
  - Jul 2 – 14 – Psarokokalo International Short Film Festival (Greece)
  - Jul 31 – Sydney Indie Short Festival (Australia)
  - Aug 2 – 6 – Inventa a Film Festival (Italy)
  - Aug 28 – Sep 2 – Odense International Film Festival (Denmark)
  - Sep 2 – ANTI-Festival «Svoymy Slovamy» (Ukraine)
  - Sep 8 – 16 – BRUKIVKA International Film Festival (Ukraine)
  - Sep 14 – 21 – DMZ International Documentary Film Festival (South Korea)
  - Sep 16 – 19 – Ciudad del Este Independent Film Festival (Portugal)
  - Sep 27 – Hong Kong Indie Film Festival (Hong Kong)
  - Sep 27 – 30 – Golden Grape Short Film Festival (Georgia)
  - Sep 27 – Oct 1 – Crested Butte Film Festival (CO, United States)
  - Sep 28 – Oct 4 – Nashville Film Festival (TN, United States)
  - Oct 6 – 14 – Hot Springs Documentary Film Festival (AR, United States)
  - Oct 7 – 15 – Sedicicorto Forlì International Film Festival (Italy)
  - Oct 11 – 15 – Filmfest Sundsvall (Sweden)
  - Oct 12 – 22 – NHdocs: the New Haven Documentary Film Festival (CT, United States)
  - Oct 20 – 29 – FILMETS Badalona Film Festival (Spain)
  - Oct 24 – 29 – Bardak Film Fest (Ukraine)
  - Oct 31 – TMFF – The Monthly Film Festival (United Kingdom)
  - Nov 3 – 4 – 24fps International Short Film Festival (TX, United States)
  - Nov 8 – 12 – We Make Movies International Film Festival (CA, United States)
  - Nov 24 – 26 – XXX festival de films courts «COURT, C'EST COURT» (France)
  - Nov 24 – 26 – Kettupäivät Social Cinema Film Festival (Finland)
