= Flying Heritage & Combat Armor Museum =

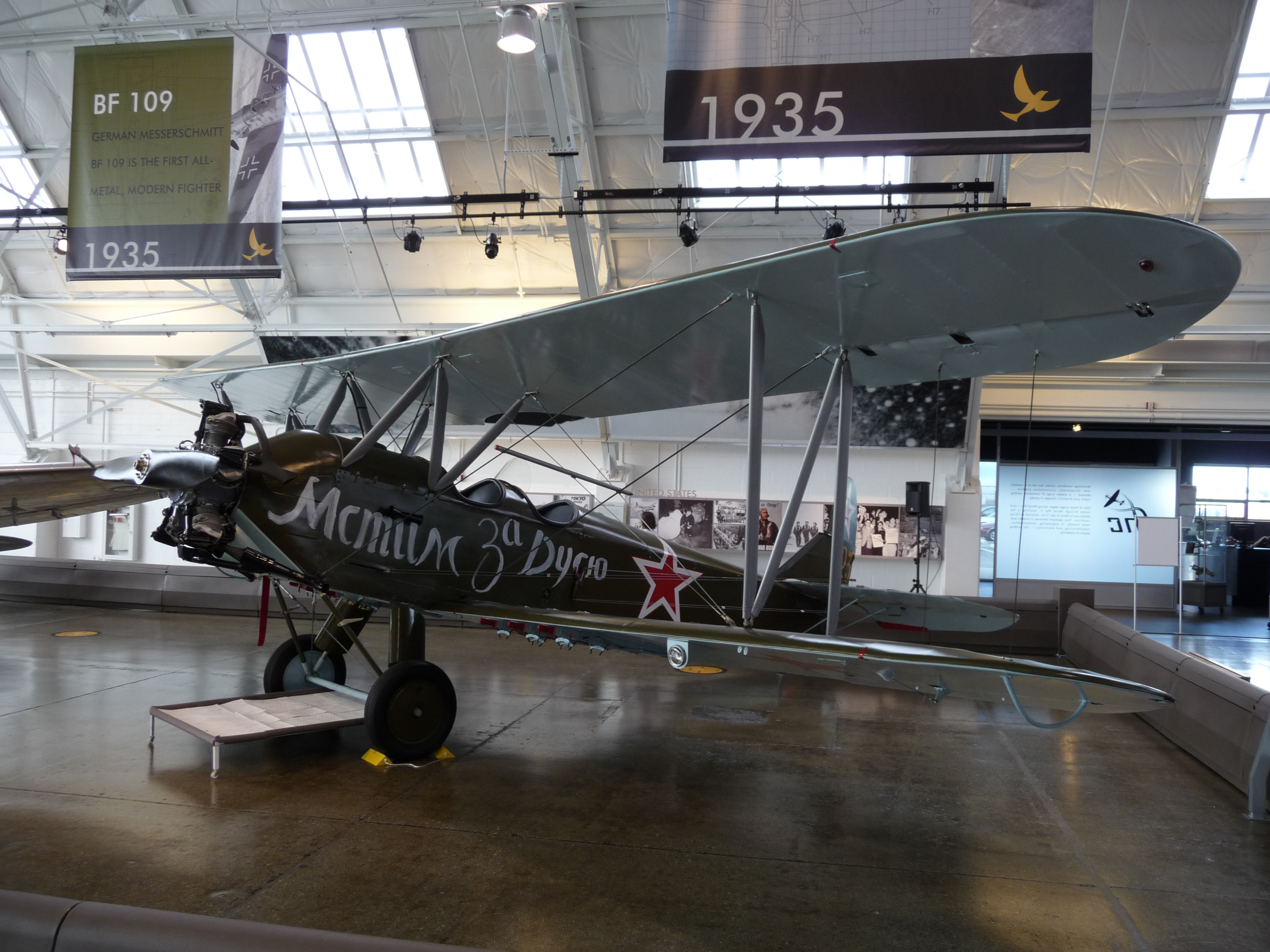
- The collection's Polikarpov Po-2 on display
- Former name: Flying Heritage Collection
- Established: 2004
- Location: Paine Field, Everett, Washington
- Coordinates: 47°53′57″N 122°16′47″W
- Type: Aviation museum
- Founder: Paul Allen
- Owner: Steuart Walton
- Website: www.flyingheritage.org

The Flying Heritage & Combat Armor Museum is a nonprofit organization dedicated to the display and preservation of rare military aircraft, tanks and other military equipment. Opened in 2004 by Paul Allen, the museum was sold in 2022 to Walmart heir Steuart Walton.

On rotation in the three working hangars are military artifacts from the United States, the United Kingdom, Germany, Japan, and the Soviet Union.

The Flying Heritage & Combat Armor Museum is based at Seattle-Paine Field International Airport in Everett, Washington. Mechanics are typically on-site Monday through Friday, working on maintaining the technology and operating condition. The museum provides guided tours three days a week, hosts a variety of activities, features war conflict simulators, and possesses historical artifacts.

== History ==
In 1998, Microsoft Corporation co-founder Paul Allen began to buy and preserve vintage aircraft. He sought to restore these artifacts to the highest standard of authenticity and share them with the public.

The Flying Heritage Collection opened to the public in 2004 at the Arlington, Washington, airfield, but in 2008 moved to a newly renovated historic industrial hangar located at Paine Field in Everett, Washington, United States. In 2013, the Flying Heritage & Combat Armor Museum added a 22,000-square-foot hangar for its expanding collection. In 2018, the museum expanded again, adding Hangar C and more than two dozen artifacts. On March 24, 2017, the Museum changed its name to the Flying Heritage & Combat Armor Museum to reflect the addition of military vehicles and weapons. In 2018, the museum became a public 501c(3) nonprofit. On March 3, 2020, the museum temporarily closed because of the COVID-19 pandemic.

In April 2022, the industry magazine Air Classics reported that the museum's collection was sold, promising further details in its June issue. The Dutch Aviation Society reported that the buyer was Steuart Walton, grandson of Walmart founder Sam Walton. The sale was confirmed by CNN and other media in August 2022. Walton established a new nonprofit organization, the Wartime History Museum, to operate the museum. The museum reopened on Memorial Day Weekend of 2023.

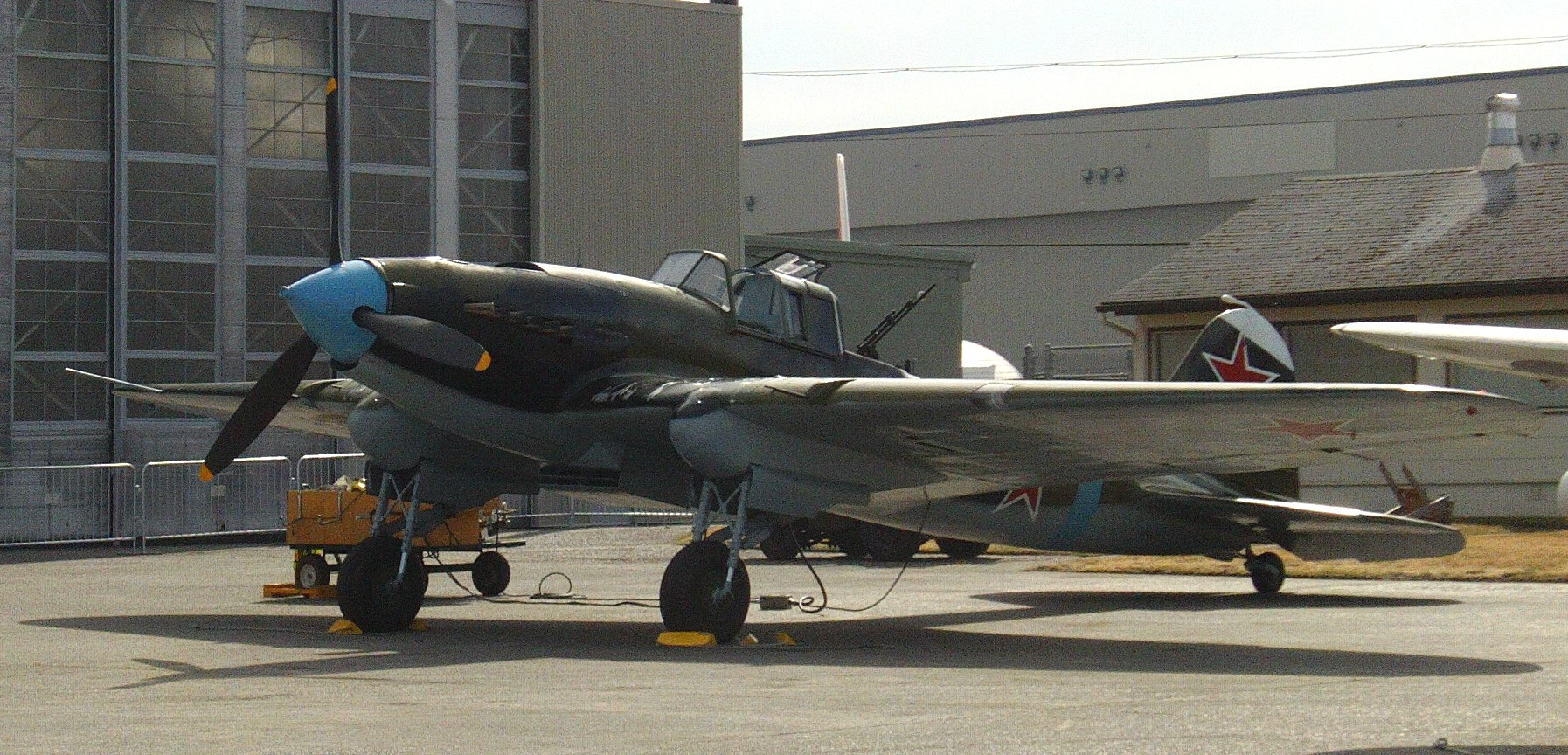
The airworthy Ilyushin Il-2 of the Flying Heritage Collection, flown with an Allison V-1710 powerplant in "reversed" orientation, like the original engine

== Collection ==
=== Aircraft ===
The newest acquisition is the P-38J Lightning "Jandina III".

==== United States ====
- North American P-51D Mustang
- Lockheed P-38J Lightning
- North American B-25J Mitchell
- Republic P-47 Thunderbolt
- Curtiss P-40C Tomahawk
- Goodyear FG-1D Corsair
- Grumman F6F Hellcat
- Curtiss JN-4D Jenny
- Bell UH-1B Iroquois "Huey"

==== United Kingdom ====
- Supermarine Spitfire Mk.Vc
- Hawker Hurricane Mk.XIIAa
- de Havilland D.H.98 Mosquito T.Mk.III
- Avro Lancaster B. Mk.I (nose section)

==== Soviet Union ====
- Polikarpov I-16 Type 24 "Rata"
- Polikarpov U-2/Po-2
- Ilyushin II-2M3 Shturmovik

==== Imperial Japan ====
- Nakajima Ki-43 Hayabusa (Oscar)
- Mitsubishi A6M3-22 Reisen (Zero or Zeke)

==== Germany ====
- Fieseler Fi 103 V-1
- Fieseler Fi 103R Reichenberg
- Fieseler Fi 156 C-2 Storch
- Focke-Wulf Fw 190 A-5
- Focke-Wulf Fw 190 D-13 (Dora)
- Messerschmitt Me 262
- Junkers Ju 87 R-4 Stuka - Under restoration
- Messerschmitt Bf 109 E-3 (Emil)
- Messerschmitt Me 163 B Komet
- Mittelwerk GmbH V-2 Rocket

=== Tanks ===
The collection includes vehicles and armament from WWII to the present day, mostly from the United States, Germany, Japan, and the Soviet Union.

==== United States ====
- M1A1 Abrams turret trainer
- M48A1 Patton (Cut in Half)
- M4A1 Sherman
- M5A1 Stuart
- M60A1 Patton
- M24 Chaffee
- M7B1 Priest
- M8 Greyhound
- M26 Pershing
- M55 self-propelled howitzer

==== United Kingdom ====
- Churchill Mk VII Crocodile

==== Soviet Union ====
- FMDB T-34/85
- T-54M

==== Germany ====
- Jagdpanzer 38(t) (Hetzer).
- Panzerkampfwagon IV Ausf. H

==== Japan ====
- Type 95 Ha-Go

=== Artillery ===
==== United States ====
- M2 155mm "Long Tom" field gun

==== United Kingdom ====
- 17-Pounder Mk. I anti-tank gun

==== Soviet Union ====
- R-11M missile on 8U218 transporter-erector-launcher vehicle (Ss-1b Scud-A)

==== Germany ====
- 75mm PaK 40 anti-tank gun
- 88mm Flak 37 anti-aircraft gun

==== Japan ====
- 47mm Type 1 anti-tank gun

=== Vehicles ===
==== United States ====
- M5A4 high-speed tractor
- AM General M936A2 wrecker
- Dodge WC24 command car
- Dodge WC54 ambulance
- Ford GPW "Jeep"
- Harley-Davidson WLA
- Landing craft, vehicle, personnel (LCVP)
- M3A1 half-track personnel carrier
- M274A5 Mule

==== Germany ====
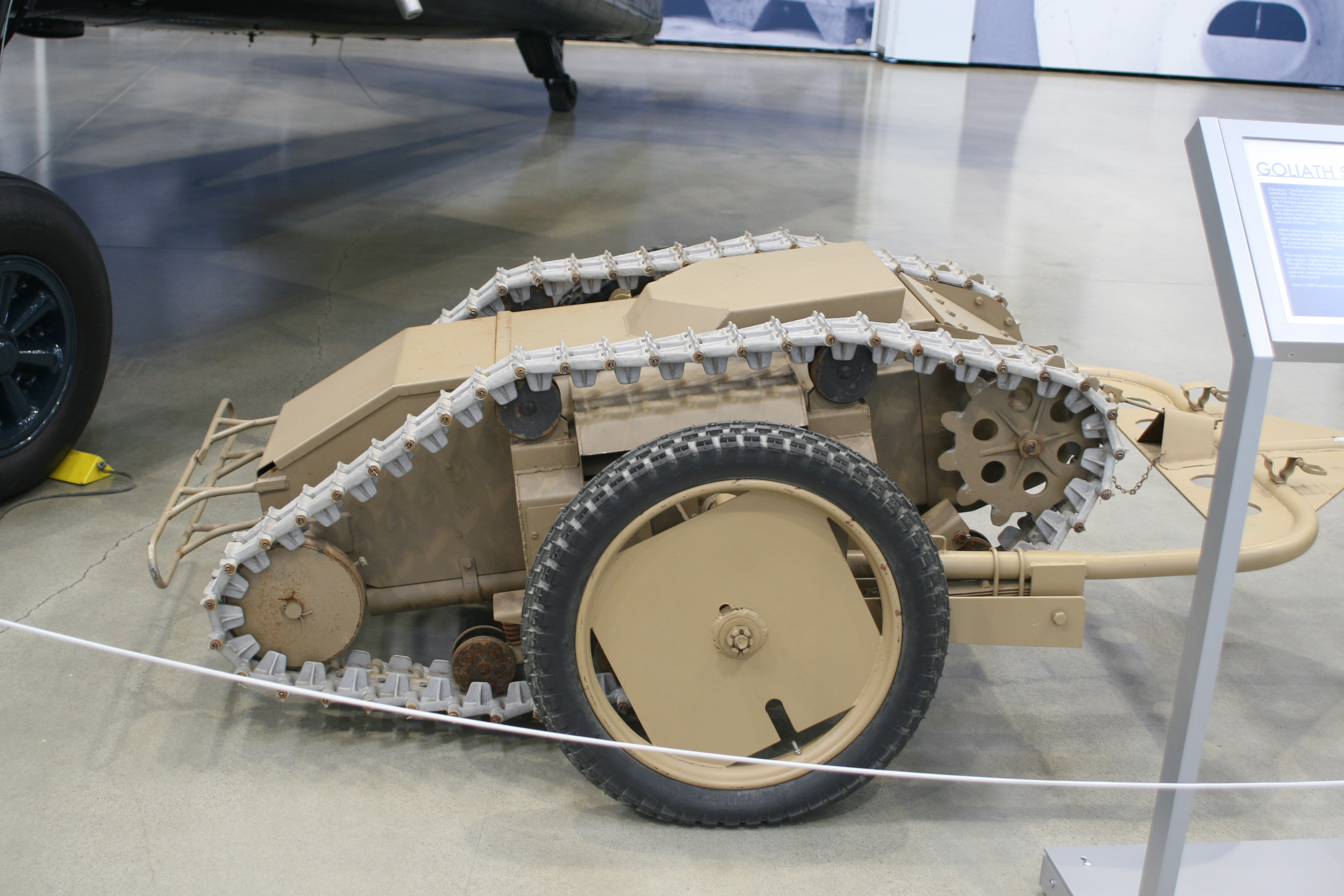
The museum's German Sd.Kfz. 303 Goliath

- BMW R75
- Opel Super 6
- Scheuch-Schlepper
- Volkswagen Kubelwagen Typ 82 Kfz.1
- Sonderkraftfahrzeug 2 Kleines Kettenkraftrad HK 101
- Leichter Ladungsträger Goliath Sd.Kfz. 303

== See also ==
- List of aerospace museums
