= We Were Here =

We Were Here may refer to:

- We Were Here (Boy album), released in 2015
- We Were Here (Joshua Radin album), released in 2006
- We Were Here (Turin Brakes album), released in 2013
- "We Were Here" (song), released in 2017
- We Were Here (2011 film), a documentary about the HIV/AIDS crisis in San Francisco
- We Were Here (2026 film), a short mockumentary about tech backlash
- We Were Here (novel), by Matt de la Peña
- We Were Here Tour, 2016 concert tour by American country musician Jason Aldean
- We Were Here (series), a series of puzzle-solving video games

== See also ==
- And While We Were Here, a 2012 film directed by Kat Coiro
- "Gonna Know We Were Here", a 2015 song by Jason Aldean
- We Were There, a series of historical novels written for children
