= Noah Kahan: Out of Body =

2026 American documentary film

- Directed by: Nick Sweeney
- Produced by: Samantha Mustari; Dave Sirulnick; Stacey Reiss; David Blackman; Ryan Kroft; Vaughn Trudeau; Anna Keegan; Jeff Ludwig; Devon Libran
- Starring: Noah Kahan
- Cinematography: James Adolphus; Asher Brown; Noah Collier; Nick Sweeney
- Edited by: Paul Little; Ana Veselic
- Music by: Oliver Claridge
- Production companies: RadicalMedia; PolyGram Entertainment; Live Nation Studios; Federal Films
- Distributed by: Netflix
- Release dates: March 16, 2026 (SXSW); April 13, 2026
- Running time: 94 minutes
- Country: United States
- Language: English

Noah Kahan: Out of Body is a 2026 American documentary film directed by Nick Sweeney. The film follows singer-songwriter Noah Kahan in the period after the success of his album Stick Season (2022) as he embarks on his follow-up album The Great Divide (2026). It premiered at the 2026 South by Southwest Film & TV Festival, where it won the 24 Beats Per Second Audience Award, and was released on Netflix on April 13, 2026.

== Synopsis ==
The film opens with Noah Kahan preparing to perform at Fenway Park in Boston and follows him through a period of rapid success and personal reckoning in the wake of his album Stick Season (2022). Combining concert footage, childhood home videos from rural Vermont, and interviews with Kahan, his family, and collaborators, the documentary chronicles his struggles with depression, body dysmorphia, as well as his complex relationships with his family. The film also explores the creative challenges Kahan faces as he attempts to write his fourth studio album, and concludes with footage of Kahan in the recording studio.

== Production ==
Noah Kahan first discussed the idea of a documentary in 2021, before the release of Stick Season (2022), initially envisioning a tour documentary. Production began in late 2023, with the focus shifting toward Kahan's mental health, family dynamics, and personal challenges. Filming concluded in the spring of 2025. The documentary features concert footage from Fenway Park and Madison Square Garden, as well as scenes filmed with Kahan's family in Strafford, Vermont. Kahan has described the filmmaking process as "really difficult" but "incredibly therapeutic."

== Release ==
The film had its world premiere at the 2026 South by Southwest Film & TV Festival on March 16, 2026, and was released on Netflix on April 13, 2026.

== Reception ==
On Rotten Tomatoes, the film holds a 100% approval rating based on 10 reviews. Brian Tallerico of RogerEbert.com gave the film three out of four stars, writing that it is "not a typical hagiographic music doc" and calling it "remarkably vulnerable and focused." Rebecca Milzoff of Billboard called it "the rare musician doc that isn't a tool for self-aggrandizement," noting its "incredibly poignant look at the real mental consequences of catapulting to stardom." Ethan Shanfeld of Variety described it as "beautiful and revealing."

== Awards ==
| Year | Award | Category | Recipient(s) | Result | Ref. |
|---|---|---|---|---|---|
| 2026 | SXSW Film Festival | 24 Beats Per Second Audience Award | Nick Sweeney | Won | |
