= Nina & Irena =

2023 American short documentary film

- Directed by: Daniel Lombroso
- Produced by: Devon Blackwell
- Starring: Nina Gottlieb
- Cinematography: Vittoria Campaner
- Edited by: David P. Zucker
- Music by: Gil Talmi
- Distributed by: The New Yorker
- Release date: November 15, 2023
- Running time: 22 minutes
- Country: United States
- Language: English

Nina & Irena is a 2023 American short documentary film directed by Daniel Lombroso. It was produced by Devon Blackwell for The New Yorker and executive produced by Errol Morris.

The film was Shortlisted for the 96th Academy Awards in the Documentary Short Film category.

== Synopsis ==
Holocaust survivor Nina Gottlieb, who is getting close to turning 90, tells her grandson (Daniel Lombroso) the tragic story of her sister Irena going missing during the Holocaust. After emigrating to the United States in 1951, Nina never mentioned the fact that she had lost 25 members of her extended family.

== Release ==
The film had its world premiere at the Big Sky Documentary Film Festival on March 1, 2023, and also made its Los Angeles premiere on November 1, 2023, at the Museum of Tolerance. It was also screened at the Museum of Jewish Heritage, Brooklyn Film Festival, Mountainfilm Festival, Nantucket Film Festival and the Hot Springs Documentary Film Festival, among others.

The film was publicly released on November 15, 2023, by The New Yorker as part of The New Yorker Documentary. The film is available for students worldwide, with a free educational study guide.

== Reception ==
David Sugarman of the Tablet wrote: "Lombroso’s success at presenting his grandmother this way—as more than an object of history—is one of the major accomplishments of the film." Eric Althoff of Screen Comment called it an "It’s another extraordinary effort from this most talented of filmmakers." Documentary filmmaker Errol Morris, who said of the film, "It's the absence of tears that gives it such extraordinary poignancy."

=== Accolades ===
Year	Award	Category	Recipient(s)	Result	Ref.
2023	Brooklyn Film Festival	Spirit Award	Daniel Lombroso	Won	
2023	Mountainfilm Festival	Best Short Film	Daniel Lombroso	Won	
2023	Sonoma International Film Festival	Best Short Film	Daniel Lombroso	Won	
2023	Montclair Film Festival	Documentary Shorts Competition	Daniel Lombroso	Nominated	
2023	National Magazine Awards	Best Video	Daniel Lombroso	Nominated	
