= Santa Camp =

2022 documentary film

- Theatrical release poster
- Directed by: Nick Sweeney
- Country of origin: United States
- Original language: English

Production
- Producers: Stacey Reiss; Nick Sweeney; Joseph Purfield
- Cinematography: Noah Collier
- Editor: Lise Lavallée
- Running time: 92 minutes

Original release
- Network: HBO Max
- Release: November 17, 2022

Santa Camp is a 2022 documentary film about a training camp for people to learn the roles of Santa Claus, Mrs. Claus, and the elves, run by the New England Santa Society in New Hampshire. The film focuses on the camp's efforts to address the lack of diversity in the portrayal of Santa, and follows three new trainees: a Black Santa, a transgender Santa, and a Santa with a disability. The film also explores the role of Mrs. Claus and the call for equal pay and billing for public appearances. The film's world premiere was at the 2022 Doc NYC film festival.

The documentary was released on November 17, 2022, on HBO Max.

== Synopsis ==
Santa Camp is set at a training camp co-founded by Dan Greenleaf, and follows his efforts to diversify the traditional portrayal of Santa Claus. Greenleaf puts it this way: "A child wants somebody who looks like them. What's the problem?" The film's director, Nick Sweeney, was attracted to the idea of documenting the Santa subculture. The experiences of both the new trainees and the trainers of the camp itself are explored.

The film focuses on the motivation of the new Santa recruits. The first recruit, Chris, was motivated to attend the camp after receiving hate mail attacking the Black Santa decorations he put up around his house in Arkansas. Chris cites the importance of representation in the film: "Representation is important to me because growing up, I didn't see it." The movie highlights Chris reading and then burning the racist letter in a campfire in front of the other Santa recruits. The film also focuses on Levi in his training to be a trans Santa. Levi cites the difference meeting a trans Santa would have had on him as a child: "I think I could have become my whole self sooner in life." When Levi appears at an event as Trans Santa, the film captures the arrival of the Proud Boys and their protestations that Trans Santa is "destroying America". Sweeney also documents the journey of Fin, who was born with spina bifida and uses an iPad to communicate. Greenleaf praised Fin, saying: "His enthusiasm and dedication to becoming Santa was obvious to all". By the end of the film, Fin appears as Santa in his town's annual Christmas parade.

Santa Camp also explores the growing role of Mrs. Claus, and highlights concerns of her performers being "sidelined" or disregarded in comparison to Santa. The film showcases camp meetings for the Mrs. Claus performers, where the topic of equal pay for Mrs. Claus as a performer is discussed.

== Reception ==
On review aggregator Rotten Tomatoes, the film holds an approval rating of 100% based on 5 reviews.

The Los Angeles Times found the movie to be "sometimes challenging and frequently moving". Salon found the film to be heartwarming, citing its exploration into evolving traditions by saying: "Santa Camp is an example of people with good intentions and insular views realizing they needed to expand the way they view the world, and the world views the figure they represent." Seven Days gave the film 4 out of 5 stars, appreciating Sweeney's attempt to document a "quirky subculture" while also "exploring broader American cultural conflicts".
