= Kelly Rohrbach =

American actress and model (born 1990)

Kelly Rohrbach Walton
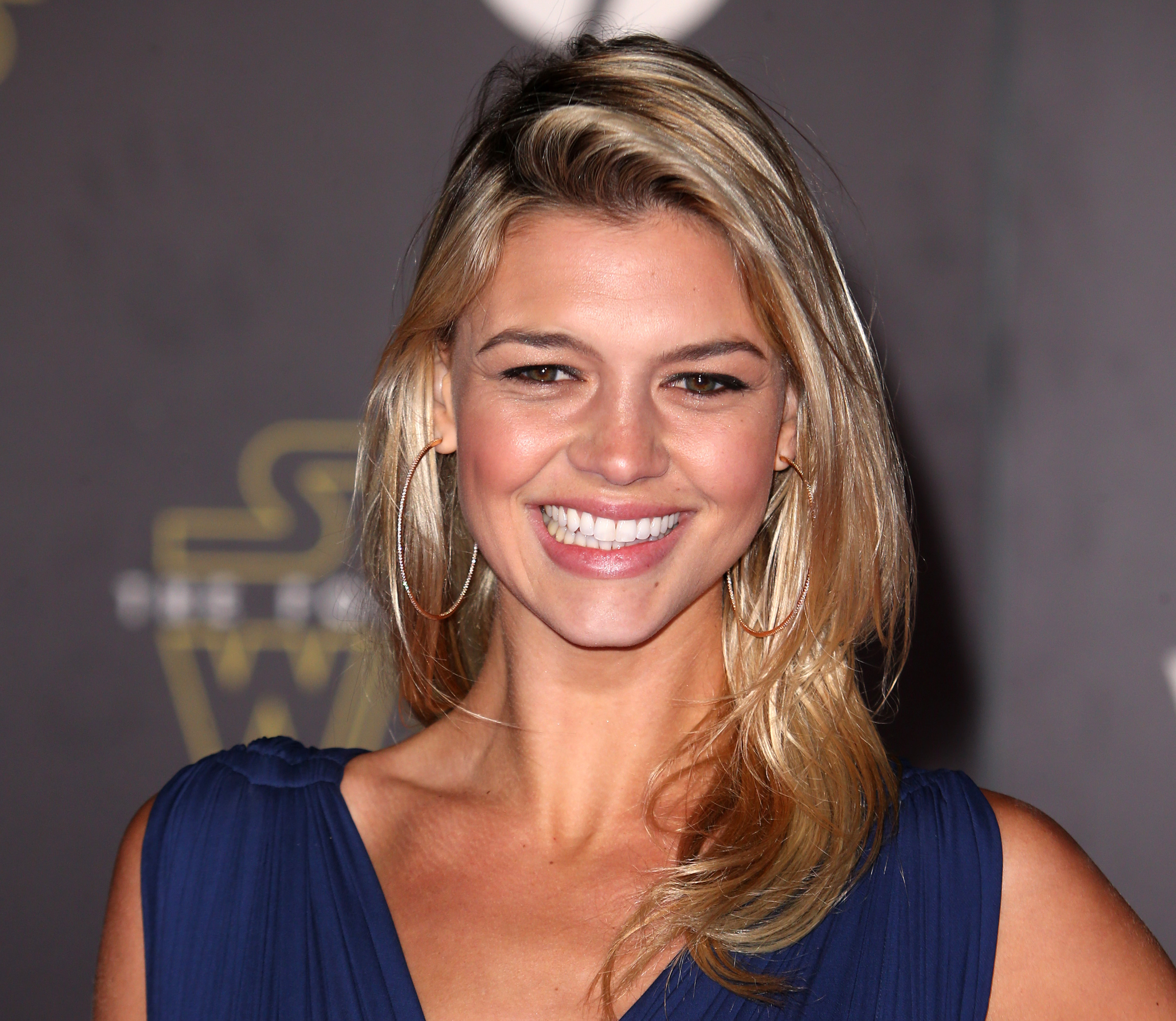
- Rohrbach in 2015
- Born: Kelly Anne Rohrbach; January 21, 1990 (age 36); New York City, U.S.
- Occupations: Model; actress; producer
- Years active: 2012–present
- Spouse: Steuart Walton (m. 2019)
- Children: 2
- Relatives: S. Robson Walton (uncle-in-law); John T. Walton (uncle-in-law); Alice Walton (aunt-in-law)

Kelly Rohrbach Walton (born January 21, 1990) is an American film producer and founder of Maybe? Productions, an independent filmmaking company. She is a former model and actress, known for her roles in Baywatch (2017), A Rainy Day in New York, and Yellowstone.

== Early life ==
Rohrbach was born in New York City and raised in Greenwich, Connecticut. She is the daughter of Anne (née Wholey) and Clay Rohrbach, an investment banker. She attended Greenwich Academy. She played golf for Greenwich and earned an athletic scholarship to Georgetown University to play golf for the Georgetown Hoyas. She graduated from Georgetown in 2012 with a degree in theatre, and enrolled at the London Academy of Music and Dramatic Art to pursue acting.

== Career ==
Rohrbach had small roles in the TV series Two and a Half Men, The New Normal, Rizzoli & Isles, Broad City, and Rush.

After working in Hollywood for two years, Rohrbach began modeling. She appeared in Gap Inc.'s 2014 holiday marketing campaign and for Old Navy denim in 2015. She appeared in the 2015 Sports Illustrated Swimsuit Issue, and was named its "Rookie of the Year". She played C. J. Parker in the 2017 feature film Baywatch, which is based on the 1989–2001 TV series of the same name. After roles in A Rainy Day in New York and Yellowstone, Rohrbach married and became a mother, which further influenced her decision to step away from acting. Additionally, Rohrbach Walton commented, "nonprofit work led me to documentary making".

In 2023, Rohrbach Walton founded Maybe? Productions, an independent filmmaking company. The production company was named after a Taoist parable: The old man lost his horse. Its first project, the documentary film, baby/girls, followed the lives of three teenage mothers in rural Arkansas. The film was released in 2026, and Rohrbach Walton was credited as a producer. Filming for the documentary took place over the course of two years and began shortly after Rohrbach Walton became pregnant with her first child.

== Personal life ==
Rohrbach dated actor and film producer Leonardo DiCaprio in 2015. In 2019, she married attorney and Walton family heir Steuart Walton. The family has two children, and as of November 2026, is expecting a third.

== Filmography ==
=== Film ===
Year	Title	Role	Notes
2012	Wilt	Beatrice	
2015	My Last Film	Ashley	Short film
2016	Café Society	Woman	Uncredited
2017	Baywatch	C. J. Parker	
2018	Ocean's 8	Herself	Cameos
2019	A Rainy Day in New York	Terry	
2026	baby/girls	—N/a	Producer

=== Television ===
Year	Title	Role	Notes
2013	The New Normal	Amber	Episode: "Dairy Queen"
2013	Two and a Half Men	Amber	Episode: "Big Episode: Someone Stole a Spoon"
2013–14	Rizzoli & Isles	Officer Charlotte "Charlie" Hansen	2 episodes
2013–15	The PET Squad Files	Jayne Duncan	12 episodes
2014	Rush	Young hottie	Episode: "Pilot"
2014	Love is Relative	Emily	Television film
2015	Deadbeat	Beth	Episode: "The Unholy Trinity"
2016	Broad City	Alice Ackerman	Episode: "Philadelphia"
2017	Angie Tribeca	Laura Ashley	Episode: "License to Drill"
2019	Yellowstone	Cassidy Reid	Recurring role; 4 episodes
