= Basic (2026 film) =

2026 American comedy film

- Directed by: Chelsea Devantez
- Written by: Chelsea Devantez
- Produced by: Marc Platt; Katie McNicol; Adam Siegel; Nadine DeBarros; Michael Philip; Richard Alan Reid
- Starring: Ashley Park; Leighton Meester; Taylor John Smith; Kate Linder; Nelson Franklin; Kandy Muse; Ashley Nicole Black; Kenzie Elizabeth; Amber Ruffin; Jon Gabrus; Georgia Mischak; Eleanor Choi
- Cinematography: Veronica Bouza
- Edited by: Drew van Steenbergen
- Music by: Tara Trudel
- Production companies: Marc Platt Productions; Fortitude International; BuzzFeed Studios; 100 Zeros; CaliWood Pictures
- Distributed by: Magenta Light Studios (United States and Canada); Universal Pictures (International)
- Release date: March 16, 2026 (SXSW)
- Running time: 96 minutes
- Country: United States
- Language: English

Basic is a 2026 American comedy film written and directed by Chelsea Devantez in her directorial debut. It stars Ashley Park, Leighton Meester, Kate Linder, Taylor John Smith, Nelson Franklin, Kandy Muse, Ashley Nicole Black, Kenzie Elizabeth, Amber Ruffin, Jon Gabrus, Georgia Mischak and Eleanor Choi.

It had its world premiere at the 2026 South by Southwest Film & TV Festival on March 16, 2026.

== Cast ==
- Ashley Park as Gloria
- Leighton Meester as Kaylinn
- Taylor John Smith as Nick
- Nelson Franklin
- Kandy Muse
- Ashley Nicole Black
- Kenzie Elizabeth
- Amber Ruffin
- Jon Gabrus
- Georgia Mischak
- Kate Linder
- Eleanor Choi

== Production ==
In October 2025, it was announced Ashley Park, Taylor John Smith, Leighton Meester, Ashley Nicole Black, Kandy Muse, Nelson Franklin, Kenzie Elizabeth and Kate Linder had joined the cast of the film, with Chelsea Devantez directing from a screenplay she wrote. Marc Platt serves as a producer.

== Release ==
It had its world premiere at the 2026 South by Southwest Film & TV Festival on March 16, 2026.
