= Savior Complex (TV series) =

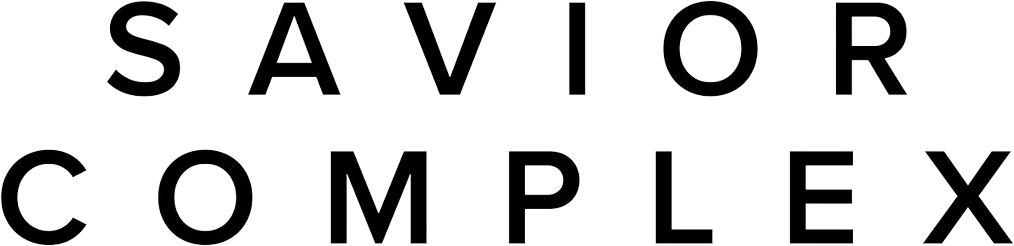
- Genre: Documentary
- Directed by: Jackie Jesko
- Music by: T. Griffin
- Country of origin: United States
- Original language: English
- No. of episodes: 3

Production
- Executive producers: Roger Ross Williams; Nick Capote; Alex Waterfield; Nancy Abraham; Lisa Heller; Sara Rodriguez
- Producers: Jackie Jesko; Paul Kabango; Derrick Kibisi
- Cinematography: Daniel Hollis
- Editors: Alicia Ellis; Andrew Coffman; Diana DeCilio
- Running time: 57–59 minutes
- Production companies: HBO Documentary Films; Latchkey Films; One Story Up

Original release
- Network: HBO
- Release: September 26 – September 27, 2023

Savior Complex is an American true crime documentary series directed and produced by Jackie Jesko. It explores the case of Serving His Children, a nonprofit organization founded by Renee Bach. Allegations arise when Bach treated sick children without medical qualifications, resulting in the deaths of children on the charity’s watch.

It premiered on September 26, 2023, on HBO.

== Premise ==
In 2009, Renee Bach starts Serving His Children, a Christian nonprofit organization, offering free meals and treatment for malnourished children. Despite not being a doctor and having no formal training, Bach treated children, resulting in the deaths of 105 children on the charity's watch. The series additionally explores missionary work, and non-governmental organizations that are used to provide resources in developing countries. Bach appears in the series alongside the founders of No White Saviors; Olivia Alaso and Kelsey Nielsen, head nurse of SHC, Constance Alonyo, SHC volunteer Jackie Kramlich, head of pediatrics at Jinja Hospital, Aber Tagnoola, human rights attorney, Primah Kwagala, two mothers who sued Renee after the deaths of their children, Kakai Annet and Gimbo Zubeda.

== Episodes ==
No.	Title	Directed by	Original release date
1	"God Doesn't Call the Qualified, He Qualifies the Called"	Jackie Jesko	September 26, 2023
2	"Cast the First Stone"	Jackie Jesko	September 27, 2023
3	"Reap What You Sow"	Jackie Jesko	September 27, 2023

== Production ==
Jackie Jesko discovered Renee Bach's story after reading an NPR article, wanting to make a documentary focusing on the legacy of colonialism and harmful white savior narratives that shape the minds of missionaries. Ugandan officials including the police and department of health, did not want to participate, which the filmmakers attribute to politics. Jesko did not show Bach the series prior to its release, and has not remained in touch with her. Roger Ross Williams serves as an executive producer.

== Reception ==
On the review aggregator website Rotten Tomatoes, 100% of 5 critics' reviews are positive, with an average rating of 8.10/10. On Metacritic, the series has a weighted average score of 81 out of 100, based on 4 critics, indicating "universal acclaim".

Brian Tallerico of RogerEbert.com gave the series 3.5 out of 4 stars, writing: "Savior Complex" is a remarkably detailed examination of this shocking case that answers most viewer questions as they arise by segueing back and forth from Bach’s story to the other people involved in this tale, intercut with sharp, revealing footage. And it never lets Bach off the hook, countering her claims with heartbreaking eyewitness testimony, showing how no one has the full picture here". Chris Vognar of Rolling Stone gave the series a positive review writing: "The result is a deeply troubling story that you paradoxically don’t want to see end, never boring but never descending to the hyperbole employed by more than one of its subjects."
