= I Am Big Bird: The Caroll Spinney Story =

- Film poster
- Directed by: Dave LaMattina; Chad N. Walker
- Screenplay by: Dave LaMattina
- Produced by: Dave LaMattina; Chad N. Walker
- Starring: Caroll Spinney; Debra Spinney; Jerry Nelson; Emilio Delgado; Loretta Long; Sonia Manzano; Bob McGrath; Joan Ganz Cooney
- Cinematography: Chad N. Walker
- Edited by: Chad N. Walker
- Music by: Joshua Johnson
- Distributed by: Tribeca Films, FEG Pictures
- Release dates: April 27, 2014 (Hot Docs); May 6, 2015
- Running time: 90 minutes
- Country: United States
- Language: English
- Box office: $75,156

I Am Big Bird: The Caroll Spinney Story is a 2014 American documentary film about Caroll Spinney, the original performer of Sesame Street characters Big Bird and Oscar the Grouch. The film received generally positive reviews. It was shown at many film festivals, including the April 2014 Hot Docs Festival.

== Reception ==
=== Commercial performance ===
The film grossed $75,156 in box office receipts and $174,553 in DVD sales, bringing the total revenue to $249,709.

=== Critical reception ===
The film has received positive reviews. On review aggregator Rotten Tomatoes, the film holds an approval rating of 84% based on 73 reviews, with an average rating of 6.7/10. The website's critical consensus reads, "Every bit as good-natured as longtime fans might hope, I Am Big Bird: The Carroll Spinney Story offers heartwarming behind-the-scenes perspective on a cultural icon." On Metacritic, the film received a weighted average score of 71 out of 100 based on 20 critics, indicating "generally favorable" reviews.
