= Nick Sweeney (director) =

Australian documentary filmmaker

- Born: Australia
- Occupations: Director, producer
- Years active: 2014–present

Nick Sweeney is a documentary director and producer. He is best known for his films AKA Jane Roe, Santa Camp and Noah Kahan: Out of Body.

== Career ==
Sweeney's early work includes the Channel 4 documentary Secrets of the Living Dolls (2014) and series Born in the Wrong Body (2015).

Sweeney directed the documentary AKA Jane Roe in 2020, which examined the life of Norma McCorvey, known as "Jane Roe" in the 1973 U.S. Supreme Court case Roe v. Wade, and premiered on FX. In 2022, he directed the HBO Max documentary Santa Camp, about a training program run by the New England Santa Society, which premiered at Doc NYC.

In 2026, Sweeney directed Noah Kahan: Out of Body, a documentary that follows singer-songwriter Noah Kahan. The film premiered at the South by Southwest, where it won the Audience Award, and was released on Netflix in April 2026.

== Selected filmography ==
Year	Title	Contribution	Note
2014	Secrets of the Living Dolls	Director and producer	Documentary
2015	Born in the Wrong Body	Director and producer	Documentary series
2017	The Sexbots Are Coming	Director and producer	Documentary
2020	AKA Jane Roe	Director and producer	Documentary
2022	Santa Camp	Director, cinematographer and producer	Documentary
2026	Noah Kahan: Out of Body	Director	Documentary

== Awards and nominations ==
Year	Result	Award	Category	Work	Ref.
2026	Won	South by Southwest Film & TV Festival	Audience Award	Noah Kahan: Out of Body	
