= Beast Race =

- English version poster
- Portuguese: Corrida dos Bichos
- Directed by: Fernando Meirelles; Rodrigo Pesavento; Ernesto Solis
- Written by: Marco Abujamra; Eva Klaver; Rodrigo Lages; Ernesto Solis
- Produced by: Vinicio Espinosa; Fernando Meirelles; Andrea Barata Ribeiro
- Starring: Matheus Abreu; Rodrigo Santoro; Isis Valverde; Bruno Gagliasso; Seu Jorge
- Cinematography: Gustavo Hadba
- Edited by: Lucas Gonzaga
- Music by: Antonio Pinto
- Production company: O2 Filmes
- Distributed by: Amazon MGM Studios
- Release dates: 17 March 2026 (SXSW); 7 August 2026 (Prime Video)
- Running time: 124 minutes
- Country: Brazil
- Language: Portuguese

Beast Race (Portuguese: Corrida dos Bichos) is a 2026 Brazilian action science fiction film directed by Fernando Meirelles (in his first Portuguese language feature since City of God), Rodrigo Pesavento and Ernesto Solis, co-written by Solis and Rodrigo Lages. Starring Matheus Abreu, Rodrigo Santoro, Isis Valverde, Bruno Gagliasso, Grazi Massafera, Seu Jorge and Leandro Firmino, it is set in a dystopian Rio de Janeiro, where the sea has dried up and the city has taken on a new geographic configuration.

The film had its world premiere at the Narrative Spotlight section of the 2026 South by Southwest Film & TV Festival on 17 March. It is scheduled to be release by in 7 August on Prime Video.

== Plot ==
In a dark future, Rio de Janeiro faces a radical transformation after the disappearance of the sea. In this new scenario, the city hosts a brutal competition known as the "Beasts Racing" in which people from marginalized classes, called "Bichos" (slang for animals) are used by tycoons as pawns in million-dollar gambling. A courageous young man enters the racing with the goal of saving his sister's life, confronting the oppressive system and putting his own life at risk.

== Cast ==
- Matheus Abreu as Mano
- Rodrigo Santoro as Abu
- Isis Valverde as Nadine
- Bruno Gagliasso
- Thainá Duarte as Dalva
- Seu Jorge
- João Guilherme
- Silvero Pereira
- Grazi Massafera
- Anitta
- Metturo
- Leandro Firmino
- Igor Fernandez

== Production ==
It marks Meirelles' feature film return to his native Portuguese language after 24 years, following City of God in 2002.

== Release ==
The film will have its world premiere at the Narrative Spotlight section of the 2026 South by Southwest Film & TV Festival on 17 March. It is scheduled to be release by Prime Video in Brazil in 2026.
