= White Noise (2020 film) =

2020 American documentary films

- Film poster
- Directed by: Daniel Lombroso
- Produced by: Kasia Cieplak-Mayr von Baldegg
- Cinematography: Daniel Lombroso
- Edited by: Carlos Rojas Felice
- Music by: Gil Talmi
- Production company: The Atlantic
- Release date: June 20, 2020 (AFI Docs)
- Running time: 94 minutes
- Country: United States
- Language: English

White Noise is a 2020 American documentary film directed by Daniel Lombroso. The film covers three figures in the alt-right movement: Richard B. Spencer, Mike Cernovich, and Lauren Southern.

== Interviews ==
- Richard B. Spencer, a white nationalist. Spencer worries that he will be blamed for further violence after the 2017 Unite the Right rally.
- Mike Cernovich, a men's rights activist and conspiracy theorist. Cernovich attempts to find a marketable opening in the movement and admits that he has no clear agenda.
- Lauren Southern, an anti-feminism and anti-immigration activist on YouTube. She reveals her issues with misogyny and sexism in the alt-right.

== Production ==
White Noise is the first full-length documentary produced by The Atlantic. Daniel Lombroso, the director, focused on the alt-right after the 2016 United States presidential election. One of his interests was answering the question, "What made white-power ideology so intoxicating, especially among my generation?" Part of his interest in the topic came from having grandparents who survived the Holocaust. Lombroso proposed documentary coverage about the alt-right movement to The Atlantic. After the Unite the Right rally, a full-length documentary was green-lit, and Lombroso said he worked "almost exclusively" on White Noise after 2017. Lombroso had done prior documentary shorts on the alt-right, which he used to build further connections to alt-right activists. Lombroso focused on the three people he identified as the most influential, then persistently worked to get revealing interviews with them.

== Release ==
White Noise premiered at AFI Docs on June 20, 2020. IndieWire highlighted it as one of the 10 most interesting films in the line-up. The film had its international premiere at IDFA in November 2020. It had its UK premiere at the Raindance Film Festival, where it won Best Documentary Film.

== Reception ==
On the review aggregator Rotten Tomatoes, the film holds an approval rating of 87% based on 30 reviews and an average rating of 7.4/10. The site's critics' consensus reads: "White Noise pulls back the curtain on the morbidly fascinating -- and chillingly mundane -- private lives of far-right figureheads." On Metacritic, the film holds a weighted average score of 77 out of 100 based on 6 critic reviews, signifying "generally favorable reviews".

Writing for Variety, Owen Gleiberman called White Noise a "lively and disturbing documentary" that exposes alt-right celebrities as "deeply shallow and self-deluded hypocrites", and wrote: "Lombroso did his homework, embedding himself with these people for several years, so that he won their trust and became privy to their private lives." Richard Roeper of the Chicago Sun-Times gave the film a score of 3 out of 4 stars, writing: "Ten minutes into Lombroso's film, it's painfully clear these are people with ugliness in their hearts and dangerously racist ideas. But there's value in seeing these how these hate hucksters operate and going behind the curtain to see how small they really are."

Chris Barsanti of The Playlist gave the film an "A", saying that it "reveals the grift behind the genocidal rhetoric" of the alt-right. Frank Scheck of The Hollywood Reporter wrote that the film "sheds a much-needed spotlight" on its subjects, but the focus comes at the expense of being more informative about the wider alt-right movement. Peter Keough of The Boston Globe called the film "fascinating, outrageous, and disturbing." Eric Kohn of IndieWire wrote, "Lombroso has made the scariest documentary of the year without telling us anything new", and stated that the film "has a compelling message at its core, by daring viewers to see the worst of our society, and cautioning against the tendency to simply tuning it out." In an interview with the director, Vox's chief film critic Alissa Wilkinson said that the film is "excellent" and "far more engaging and smart than most journalistic profiles of each of these people." Wendy Ide of Screen International called it "unprecedented" and "queasily compelling." Randy Myers of the Mercury News said it is "one of the most important - and scariest - documentaries of 2020," giving it 3.5 out of 4 stars.

Nick Allen of RogerEbert.com gave the film a score of 2 out of 4 stars, writing that the film "is not so much about interrogating the alt-right as it is humanizing them through observation". He added: "as everyone seems to have run out of hate to sell, "White Noise" says little about its movement except showing that to stay grifting, you have to adapt." Ben Kenisberg, writing for The New York Times, said: "While the film doesn't take a strict fly-on-the-wall approach — Lombroso can occasionally be heard offscreen challenging his subjects — it sticks close enough to inner circles that its message sometimes risks coming across as "extremists are just like us."" Barbara Shulgasser-Parker of Common Sense Media gave the film a score of 2 out of 5 stars, writing: "Director Daniel Lambroso [sic] thinks that fair reporting in White Noise means letting the racist activists he's profiling speak for themselves in the hopes that viewers will see through their hatred. Given that his subjects have already proven themselves experts at exploiting social media to spread lies to millions (Pizzagate, Hillary Clinton is dying, etc.), this documentary mostly serves to expose an even wider audience to their vile attitudes."

White Noise was named one of the top documentaries of 2020 by Vox and The Boston Globe. The film is a 2021 finalist for the Livingston Award in National Reporting.
