= Tendaberry =

2024 independent film

- Official poster
- Directed by: Haley Elizabeth Anderson
- Screenplay by: Haley Elizabeth Anderson
- Produced by: Carlos Zozaya; Matthew Petock; Zach Shedd; Daniel Patrick Carbone; Hannah Dweck; Theodore Schaefer; Haley Elizabeth Anderson
- Starring: Kota Johan; Yuri Pleskun; Stella Tompkins; Erika Kutalia
- Production companies: Flies Collective; Dweck Productions; Neon Heart Productions; Spark Features
- Distributed by: Tribeca Films
- Release dates: January 21, 2024 (Sundance); March 25, 2025
- Running time: 117 minutes
- Country: United States
- Language: English

Tendaberry is a 2024 American film about a woman's life in post-pandemic New York City. The world premiere of the film was at the 2024 Sundance Film Festival.

== Synopsis ==
Set in New York City, the film followed 23-year-old protagonist Dakota as she navigates life after her boyfriend leaves for Ukraine against the backdrop of Coney Island and Brighton Beach.

== Cast ==
- Kota Johan
- Yuri Pleskun
- Stella Tompkins
- Erika Kutalia
- Malkam Saunds

== Production ==
The film was produced by Carlos Zozaya, Matthew Petock, Zach Shedd, Daniel Patrick Carbone, Hannah Dweck, Theodore Schaefer, Haley Elizabeth Anderson.

== Release ==
The film premiered in the Next section at the 2024 Sundance Film Festival on January 21, 2024. In November 2024, Tribeca Films acquired distribution rights to the film. It was released on March 25, 2025.

== Reception ==
=== Critical reception ===
On the review aggregator website Rotten Tomatoes, 91% of 11 critics' reviews are positive, with an average rating of 7.10/10.

In a review for Variety, Carlos Aguilar wrote: "By the time a stirringly assembled coda on time's cruelty and the insignificance of our presence on this planet knocks the wind out of us, we have come to the realization that Anderson's quietly sumptuous 'Tendaberry' has allowed us to intimately inhabit another person's existence."
