= Chili Finger =

2026 American black comedy film

- Directed by: Edd Benda; Stephen Helstad
- Written by: Stephen Helstad
- Produced by: Sam Sandweiss; Jo Henriquez
- Starring: Judy Greer; Sean Astin; Bryan Cranston; John Goodman
- Cinematography: Cristina Dunlap
- Edited by: Todd Zelin
- Music by: Dan Deacon
- Production companies: Beyond the Porch; Darkwell Entertainment; YellowHouse Entertainment
- Distributed by: Sumerian Pictures
- Release date: March 14, 2026 (SXSW)
- Running time: 101 minutes
- Country: United States
- Language: English

Chili Finger is a 2026 American crime black comedy film directed by Edd Benda and Stephen Helstad, and written by Helstad. It stars Judy Greer, Sean Astin, Bryan Cranston, and John Goodman.

It had its world premiere at the 2026 South by Southwest Film & TV Festival on March 14, 2026.

== Premise ==
A recently empty-nested mother Jessica Lipki discovers a severed human finger in her bowl of chili and blackmails the regionally-beloved "Blake Junior's" fast-food chain for $100,000. Blake Junior, the plutocratic founder behind the restaurant, recruits his ex-marine buddy, Dave, to investigate Jess and discover the truth behind the chili finger.

== Cast ==
- Judy Greer as Jessica Lipki
- Sean Astin as Ron Lipki
- Bryan Cranston as Dave, war veteran and fixer for Blake Jr
- John Goodman as Blake Jr, CEO of a fast-food restaurant
- Madeline Wise as Blake Jr. II, Blake Jr's daughter and business executive of his fast-food restaurant
- Paul Stanko as Trevor, factory worker
- Sarah Herrman as Nia, Trevor's pregnant wife
- Sara Sevigny as Jackie
- Dann Florek as Carl
- Shaya Harris as Kris Lipki, Jessica and Ron's daughter who is heading to college

== Production ==
In November 2024, it was announced that a crime comedy film directed by Edd Benda and Stephen Helstad was in pre-production, with Judy Greer, Sean Astin, Bryan Cranston, John Goodman, Sarah Herrman, and Paul Stanko joining the cast. Principal photography began in May 2025, in central Illinois.

== Release ==
It had its world premiere at the 2026 South by Southwest Film & TV Festival on March 14, 2026. In September 2026, Sumerian Pictures acquired U.S. and Canadian distribution rights.
