= Daniel Lombroso =

American documentary filmmaker and journalist

- Lombroso at Sundance Film Festival 2024
- Born: 1992 or 1993 (age 32–33); New Rochelle, New York, U.S.
- Occupations: Director, producer, journalist
- Years active: 2020–present

Daniel Lombroso (born 1993) is an American documentary filmmaker and journalist. He is known for embedding inside of extremist groups to capture their influence on modern politics. His films White Noise, American Scar, Nina & Irena, and Manhood have received critical acclaim.

== Life and career ==
Lombroso was born in New Rochelle, New York, the grandson of two Holocaust survivors. After graduating from McGill University, where he studied political science, he began working for The Atlantic and The New Yorker. While on staff at those magazines, Lombroso's films explored Russian espionage, Israel's settlement movement, plastic surgery addiction, and the Holocaust, and were recognized with major journalism awards.

In 2020, Lombroso directed his first documentary feature, White Noise, for which he spent four years embedded inside the so-called alt-right movement. During the production of the film, he exposed Vice co-founder Gavin McInnes for sexual harassment and captured alt-right members embracing Nazi ideology. The film was named one of the top documentaries of 2020 by Vox and The Boston Globe.

In 2021, Lombroso's documentary short on the US-Mexico border, American Scar, won a Special Jury Mention at DOC NYC and was nominated for the National Magazine Awards. In 2023, he directed Nina & Irena about his grandmother's survival in the Holocaust. It was Executive Produced by Errol Morris. He was named to the 2023 Forbes 30 under 30 list in the Media category. In 2024, he co-directed the documentary short Denial with Paul Moakley, which premiered worldwide on September 09, 2024 via The New Yorker.

In April 2025, Lombroso and Kerry Mack founded Outerboro Films in Brooklyn. Its projects include Manhood, a documentary about a Texas businessman’s efforts to normalize penis enlargement. The project was developed under the working title You’ll Be Happier and had its world premiere at the 2026 South by Southwest Film & TV Festival, with backing from World of Wonder and Penny Lane. It has received positive reviews from critics, who note its sensitive and non-judgmental style.

== Filmography ==
Year	Title	Contribution	Note
2020	White Noise	Director, cinematographer and producer	Documentary
2021	American Scar	Director and producer	Documentary short
2022	Liturgy of Anti-Tank Obstacles	Producer	Documentary short
2023	Nina & Irena	Director	Documentary short
2024	Denial	Director	Documentary short
2026	Manhood	Director	Documentary

== Awards and nominations ==
Year	Result	Award	Category	Work	Ref.
2021	Won	Raindance Film Festival	Best Documentary Film	White Noise	
2021	Won	Jacksonville Film Festival	Best Documentary Feature	White Noise	
2021	Nominated	Livingston Award	National Reporting	White Noise	
2022	Nominated	American Film Institute	Documentary Short Film	American Scar	
2022	Won	Doc NYC	Special Mention	American Scar	
2022	Nominated	National Magazine Awards	Best Video	American Scar	
2022	Won	Doc NYC	Special Mention	Liturgy of Anti-Tank Obstacles	
2023	Nominated	Big Sky Documentary Film Festival	Best Mini Doc	Liturgy of Anti-Tank Obstacles	
2023	Nominated	International Documentary Association	Best Short Documentary	Liturgy of Anti-Tank Obstacles	
2023	Nominated	Flickerfest	Best Documentary Short	Liturgy of Anti-Tank Obstacles	
2023	Won	Sonoma International Film Festival	Best Short Film	Nina & Irena	
2023	Won	Brooklyn Film Festival	Spirit Award	Nina & Irena	
2023	Won	Mountainfilm	Best Short Film	Nina & Irena	
2023	Nominated	National Magazine Awards	Best Video	Nina & Irena	
2023	Nominated	Montclair Film	Documentary Shorts Competition	Nina & Irena	
2025	Nominated	Livingston Award	National Reporting	Denial	
