= Rapha (sportswear) =

Sportswear and lifestyle brand

- Traded as: Rapha Performance Roadwear
- Industry: Sporting goods
- Founded: 2004; 22 years ago
- Founders: Simon Mottram; Luke Scheybeler
- Headquarters: London, England
- Area served: Worldwide
- Key people: Francois Convercey (CEO)
- Products: Clothing, accessories, skin care, cafés, Books
- Website: rapha.cc

Rapha Performance Roadwear is a cycling lifestyle brand focused on road bicycle racing and mountain biking clothing and accessories. Rapha has its headquarters in London and a United States office in Bentonville, Arkansas.

== History ==
The company was started in London in early 2004 by Simon Mottram and Luke Scheybeler. Its first products were launched in July of the same year. The name Rapha was taken from the 1960s cycling team Rapha, itself named after the apéritif drink company Saint-Raphaël.

In 2007, Rapha partnered with British designer Paul Smith to create a range of cycle clothing and accessories. In 2016, it collaborated with bikepacking designer Apidura on a range of cycling luggage.

In August 2017, RZC Investments, a company set up by Steuart Walton, announced that it would buy Rapha for £200m.

In February 2020, Rapha announced that it would move its North American headquarters from Portland, Oregon to Bentonville, Arkansas.

In the same year, Rapha collaborated with Palace Skateboards on a cycling kit for professional cycling team EF Education–EasyPost at the 2020 Giro d'Italia.

In 2021, Rapha entered the mountain bike market, launching its first range of mountain biking clothing in collaboration with Smith on a line of helmets.

== Organizations and venues ==
In 2015, Rapha developed an international cycling club called the Rapha Cycling Club (RCC), whose members get benefits with the company. Today, it has over 20,000 members.

Rapha has about 21 international stores throughout North America, Europe, Asia and Oceania. They are called "clubhouses."

The Rapha Foundation was created in 2019 by Rapha co-founder Simon Mottram and shareholders Tom and Steuart Walton to fund various non-profit cycling organizations, and to introduce cycling to a wider audience. It provides $1.5 million a year in funding, and supports non-profits in the UK, United States, Germany, Australia and Japan.

== Sponsorships ==
In August 2012, Rapha announced that from 2013 it would be producing the clothing for the British cycling team, Team Sky. On 3 November 2015 it announced that its Team Sky sponsorship would end after the 2016 season.

In 2015, Rapha announced it would begin supplying clothing to the UCI Women's WorldTour team Canyon-SRAM. However, in 2022, Canyon-SRAM said it would drop Rapha as its clothing outfitters. EF Education First started wearing Rapha clothing in the 2019 race season, alongside UCI Men's WorldTour team EF Education–EasyPost.

In 2022, Rapha became a supporter of the UCI Women's WorldTour team EF Education–Tibco–SVB.

Rapha also sponsors UCI Continental cycling teams L39ION of Los Angeles and Roxsolt Liv SRAM, and professional cyclists Lael Wilcox, Maghalie Rochette, and Sarah Sturm.

== See also ==
- Sportswear (activewear)
