= Sarah Carter =

Canadian actress (born 1980)

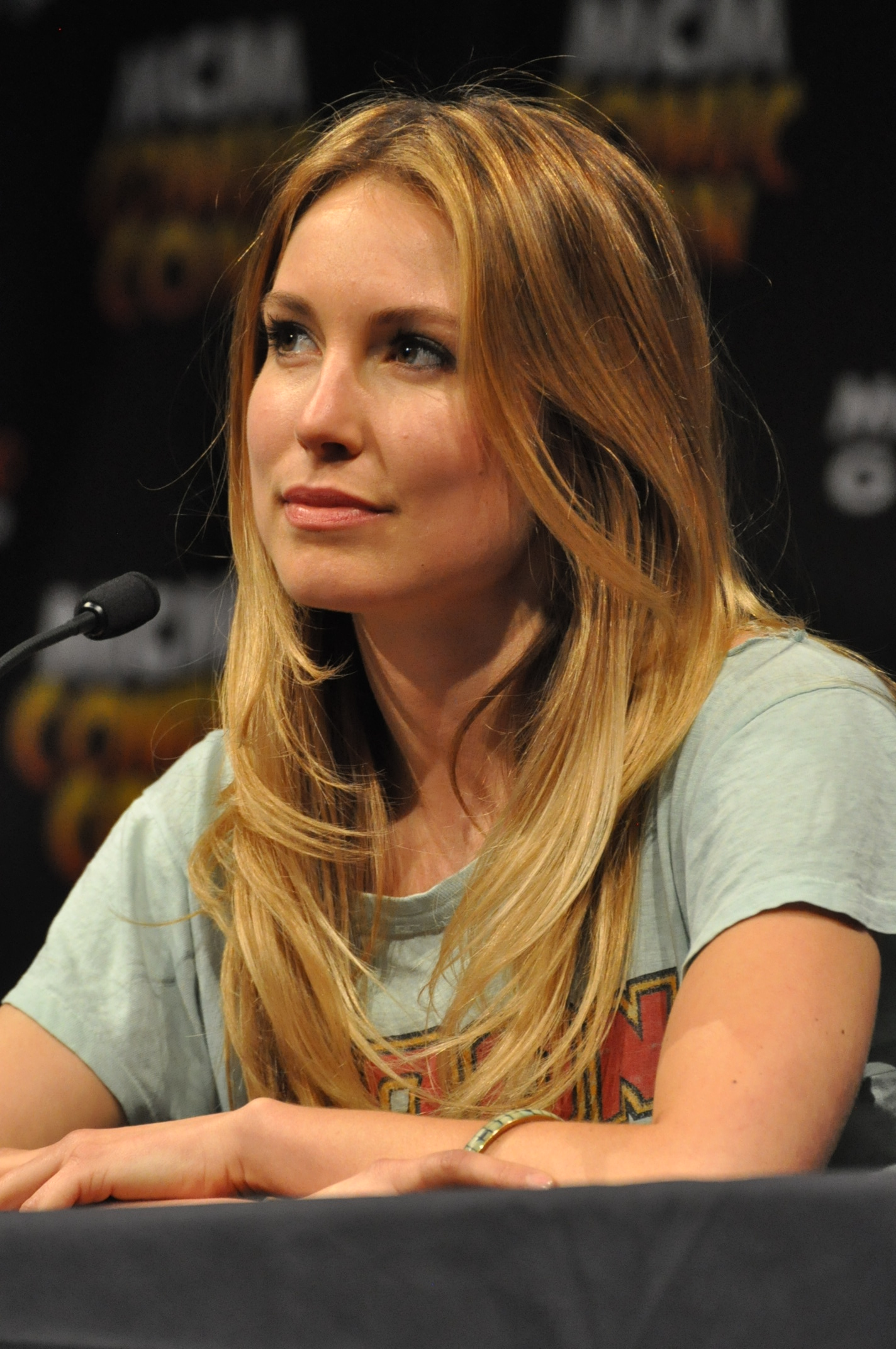
- Carter at the Falling Skies Panel; MCM London Comic Con 2013
- Born: Sarah Sanguin Carter; October 30, 1980 (age 45); Toronto, Ontario, Canada
- Occupations: Actress; writer; director
- Years active: 2000–present
- Spouse: Kevin Barth (m. 2014)
- Children: 1

Sarah Sanguin Carter (born October 30, 1980) is a Canadian actress, writer and director. She is known for her recurring role as Alicia Baker in the superhero series Smallville (2004–2005), Madeleine Poe in Shark (2006–2008), and main role as Maggie May in the TNT science fiction series Falling Skies (2011–2015).

== Personal life ==
Sarah Carter was born in Toronto and raised in Winnipeg, Manitoba. She was a student in the prestigious Royal Winnipeg Ballet and an accomplished member of the debate team. She competed in various countries including Austria, the United Kingdom, and Argentina.

After graduating high school at Balmoral Hall School in Winnipeg, Carter moved to Switzerland where she studied fine arts for one year. She subsequently attended Ryerson Theatre School in Toronto. Later, Carter took time off from acting, spending time in India and Cuba, where she worked in an orphanage.

On June 19, 2011, Carter was one of thirty-five climbers who scaled Mount Shasta to raise money for the Breast Cancer Fund, for which she is a spokesperson. She has also hiked the West Coast Trail.

Carter is married to Kevin Barth, whom she wed in 2014. They have a daughter born in 2017.

== Career ==
=== Acting ===
Carter's early television career included appearances in Wolf Lake, Dark Angel, and Undeclared, and she was also cast in Final Destination 2. She also appeared in three episodes of Smallville, in which she played Alicia Baker, who has a romantic relationship with Clark Kent (Tom Welling). In 2006, Carter starred in the film DOA: Dead or Alive, playing the character Helena Douglas, a fighter who enters a martial arts contest.

Carter's later television career has included playing the character Madeline Poe, a rookie prosecutor in Shark between 2006 and 2008, appearing in all 38 episodes of the series. In 2009, she also appeared in CSI: NY, as the character Haylen Becall, a forensic school graduate.

Carter became a regular character, Maggie May, on the TNT series Falling Skies, which debuted in June 2011. An apocalyptic alien invasion story, season 2 began on June 17, 2012 and concluded on August 19, 2012. Season 3 premiered June 9, 2013. On the heels of Falling Skies airing its series finale in 2015, Carter booked a recurring arc on CBS’ Hawaii Five-0 as a potential love interest to Steve McGarrett (Alex O'Loughlin).

=== Music ===
Carter released a solo album, Before Three, in December 2009. She is part of the duo SanguinDrake, founded in 2010. As of December 2012, the band has released four self-produced music videos on their website. On May 12, 2012, SanguinDrake released their first album Pretty Tricks.

=== Directing ===
Carter wrote and produced her feature directing debut film, In Her Name, which premiered at the 2022 Tribeca Film Festival. The film won an Audience Award, and was released in June 2024 by Tribeca Films, Giant Pictures, and Drafthouse Films.

== Acting Credits ==
=== Film ===
Year	Title	Role	Notes
2001	Mindstorm	Rayanna Armitage	
2001	Wishmaster 3: Beyond the Gates of Hell	Melissa Bell	
2002	K-9: P.I.	Babe	
2003	Final Destination 2	Shaina	
2004	Haven	Chanel	
2005	Berkeley	Alice	
2006	Skinwalkers	Katherine	
2006	DOA: Dead or Alive	Helena Douglas	
2006	Pledge This!	Kristen Haas	
2007	Killing Zelda Sparks	Zelda Sparks	
2009	Red Mist	Kim	
2009	Misconceptions	Lucy	
2012	The Vow	Diane	
2012	Tripping Tommy	Maggie	
2014	Guardian	Paquita	
2016	The Guru and The Gypsy	Maggie Turner	
2019	Business Ethics	Veronica	
2020	Pearl	Helen	
2022	In Her Name	Mother	Also director, producer and writer
2023	Nosferatu	Ellen Hutter	

=== Television ===
Year	Title	Role	Notes
2000	Cold Squad	Libby Logan	Episode: "Root Cause"
2001	The Immortal	Ellie	Episode: "The Good Squire"
2001	Los Luchadores	Maria Valentine	Main role (16 episodes)
2001	Trapped	Claire Thorensen	Television film
2001	Wolf Lake	Brianna	Episode: "The Changing"
2001	Dark Angel	Katarina	Episode: "Boo"
2002	Undeclared	Evie	Episode: "The Perfect Date"
2002	The Sausage Factory	Valerie	Episode: "Hang Ups"
2003	Black Sash	Allie Bennett	Main role (8 episodes)
2003	The Twilight Zone	Amber	Episode: "Sunrise"
2003	A Date with Darkness	Sarah	Television film
2004–2005	Smallville	Alicia Baker	3 episodes
2005	Boston Legal	Tracey Green	Episode: "It Girls and Beyond"
2005	Entourage	Cassie	Episode: "The Sundance Kids"
2005	Numb3rs	Nadine Hodges	3 episodes
2006–2008	Shark	Madeleine Poe	Main role (38 episodes)
2008	Confessions of a Go-Go Girl	Angela Lucas	Television film
2008	Dirty Sexy Money	Wrenn Darcy	2 episodes
2008	The Cleaner	Liz	Episode: "Standing Eight"
2009	CSI: NY	Haylen Becall	3 episodes
2010	White Collar	Pierce	Episode: "Home Invasion"
2011	Salem Falls	Addie Peabody	Television film
2011–2015	Falling Skies	Margaret "Maggie" May	Main role (50 episodes)
2013	The Toyman Killer	Kate Kovic	Television film
2014	One Starry Christmas	Holly Jensen	Television film
2015	Rogue	DEA Agent Harper Deakins	Main role (20 episodes)
2015	Buried Secrets	Sarah Winters	Television film
2015	Hawaii Five-0	Lynn Downey	4 episodes
2018	Law & Order: Special Victims Unit	Lilah Finch	Episode: "Accredo"
2019	The Flash	Grace Gibbons / Cicada II	6 episodes
2025	The Family Business: New Orleans	Sheriff Clay	Main role (8 episodes)

== Awards and nominations ==
Year	Award	Category	Work	Result	Refs
2019	Teen Choice Awards	Choice TV Villain	The Flash	Nominated	
