= American Scar =

2021 film directed by Daniel Lombroso

- Directed by: Daniel Lombroso
- Produced by: Daniel Lombroso; Yara Bishara; Melissa Fajardo; Stephania Taladrid
- Cinematography: Adam Perez John Darwin Kurc
- Edited by: Eric Maierson
- Music by: Gil Talmi
- Distributed by: The New Yorker
- Release dates: 2021 (Premiere); April 30, 2022 (Public online release)

American Scar is a 2021 documentary short film directed by Daniel Lombroso. It focuses on the damage caused to desert ecosystems by the construction of a barrier at the Mexico–United States border.

== Synopsis ==
American Scar focuses on the damage caused to desert ecosystems by the Mexico–United States barrier, with a particular focus on that caused by the 400-mile portion built under the Trump administration. The administration's classification of the construction as a matter of national security made it exempt from more than 80 regulations including the Clean Water Act, the Clean Air Act, and the Endangered Species Act; the newly built sections of wall endanger more than 70 species. The film additionally argues that the wall is ineffective at preventing border crossings by humans.

== Production ==
American Scar was directed by Daniel Lombroso. Its executive producer was Soo-Jeong Kang, while producers included Lombroso as well as Yara Bishara, Melissa Fajardo, and Stephania Taladrid. Adam Perez was the cinematographer, Eric Maierson was editor, and music was provided by Gil Talmi. The film was publicized by The New Yorker. It also features video footage taken from a drone by photographer John Kurc.

Produced in the United States, the documentary film is a short with a runtime of 13 minutes.

== Release ==
American Scar made its world premiere at DOC NYC in 2021 as one in a group of short films under the theme "OUR IMPACT/OUR CRISIS", where it received an honorable mention for the grand jury prize for short film, which was won by Nasir. Its international premiere occurred at Hot Docs. It was also shown at Big Sky Documentary Film Festival and the Environmental Film Festival in the Nation's Capital, among others.

American Scar was publicly released on April 30, 2022 by The New Yorker as part of The New Yorker Documentary. It was later featured on Short of the Week, where it was praised as a "a depiction of 'the wall' as it is not often seen."

== Reception ==
Wildlands Network borderlands coordinator Myles Traphagen praised the film, describing it as "really highlighting the harms that border-wall construction have inflicted upon protected lands and water and wildlife". Peter Keough of The Boston Globe called the film "potent" and recommended it as a documentary to watch.
