= Manhood (2026 film) =

2026 American documentary film

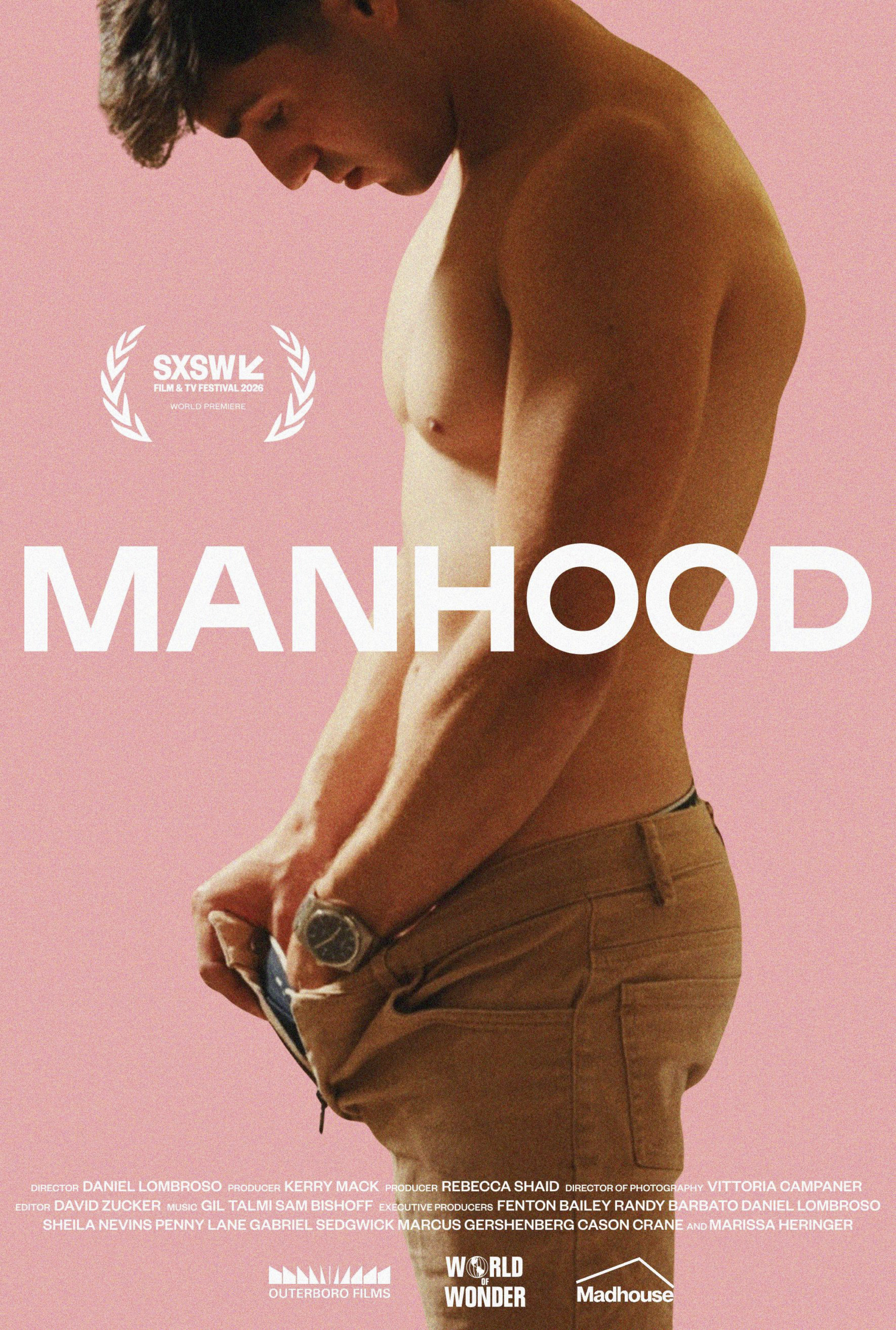
- Directed by: Daniel Lombroso
- Produced by: Kerry Mack; Rebecca Shaid
- Starring: William Moore; Ruben Ramirez; David Smith
- Cinematography: Vittoria Campaner
- Edited by: David P. Zucker
- Music by: Gil Talmi; Sam Bishoff
- Production companies: Outerboro Films; World of Wonder Productions; Madhouse Films
- Release date: March 14, 2026 (South by Southwest)
- Running time: 91 minutes
- Country: United States
- Language: English

Manhood is a 2026 American documentary film directed by Daniel Lombroso. It follows Dallas entrepreneur Bill Moore as he attempts to make penis enlargement procedures as commonplace as Botox injections.

The film had its world premiere at the 2026 South by Southwest Film & TV Festival on March 14, 2026. It received positive reviews from critics.

== Synopsis ==
The documentary centers on Bill Moore, a businessman in Dallas, Texas, who seeks to normalize cosmetic penis enlargement procedures. It follows his efforts alongside other subjects, including an OnlyFans creator and a father of five, who engage with or consider the treatments.

== Production ==
This documentary is directed by Daniel Lombroso. The project was developed under the working title You’ll Be Happier. Lombroso left his position at The New Yorker and pursued this project as a way to explore the manosphere and men's mental health. It is produced by Kerry Mack and Rebecca Shaid, with executive producers Randy Barbato, Fenton Bailey, Sheila Nevins, and Penny Lane. The film is a production of Outerboro Films in association with World of Wonder Productions and Madhouse Films.

== Release ==
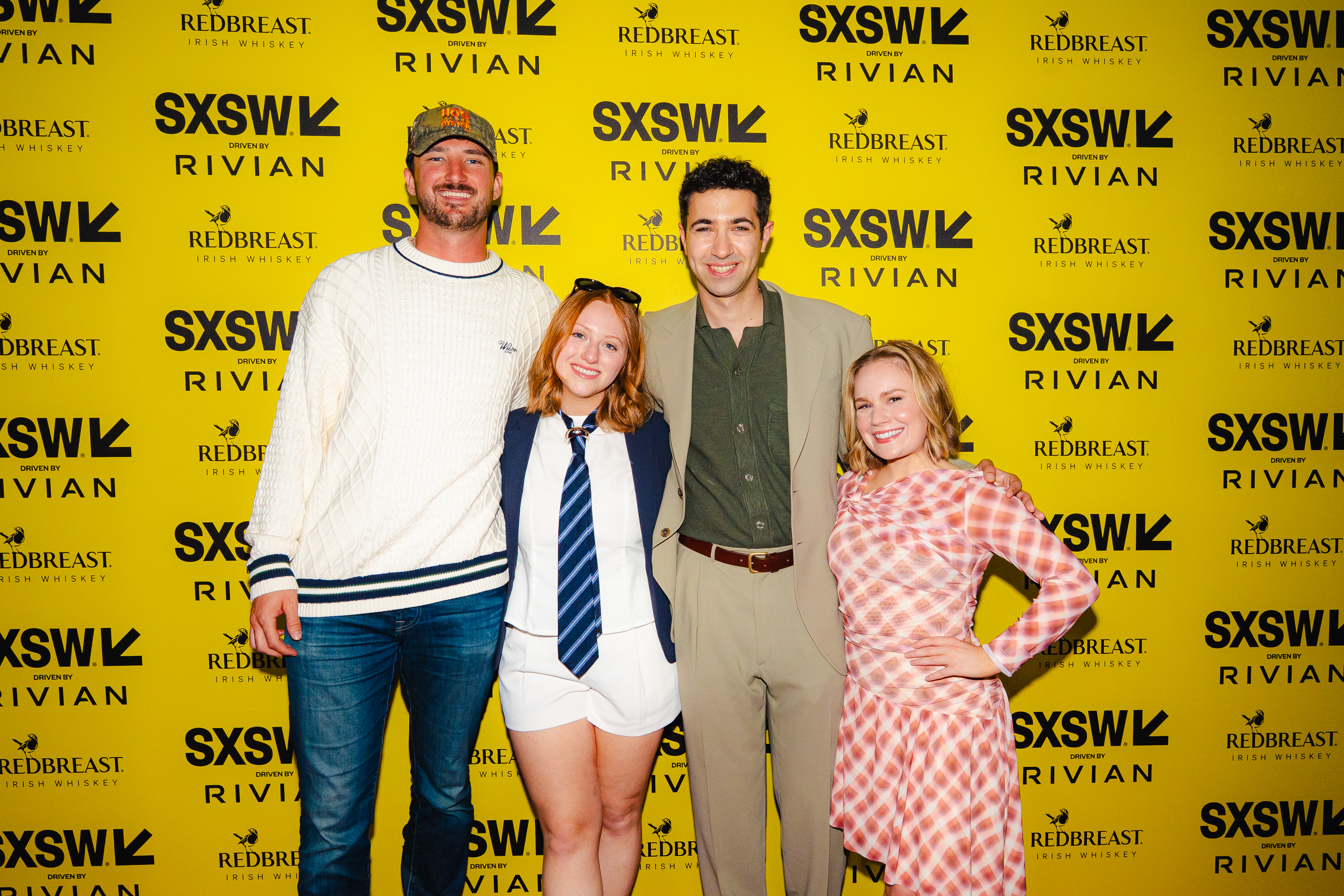
Director Daniel Lombroso and the Manhood team at the SXSW Premiere

The film had its world premiere at the 2026 South by Southwest Film & TV Festival on March 14, 2026. Ahead of the festival, IndieWire included it in its list of "15 Films to Check Out" at SXSW 2026, while Deadline featured it in its "SXSW Preview + Hot List.

== Reception ==
On the review aggregator website Rotten Tomatoes, 100% of 17 critics' reviews are positive, with an average rating of 7.7/10. On Metacritic, the film has a weighted average score of 77 out of 100 based on seven critics, which the site labels as "generally favorable" reviews.

Ryan Lattanzio at IndieWire noted that Lombroso’s skillfully constructed film is "funny in the best and worst ways," understanding "the humor inherent to this situation, but he also understands the sad parts, the well of male insecurity it’s all coming from." Tomris Laffly of Variety wrote that Lombroso "finds humanity, humor, and empathy in the fragility of the male self-esteem," praising how he balances "a gentle approach with serious contemplation and a sense of humor". For The Hollywood Reporter, Daniel Fienberg called Manhood "Very gnarly and admirably non-judgmental."
