= Barbara Walters: Tell Me Everything =

2025 American documentary film

Barbara Walters Tell Me Everything
- Official poster
- Directed by: Jackie Jesko
- Produced by: Jackie Jesko; Marcella Steingart; Sara Bernstein; Meredith Kaulfers
- Cinematography: Matt Porwoll
- Edited by: Andrew Morreale
- Music by: Sami Jano
- Production companies: ABC News Studios; Imagine Documentaries; Latchkey Films
- Distributed by: Hulu
- Release dates: June 12, 2025 (Tribeca); June 23, 2025 (United States)
- Running time: 95 minutes
- Country: United States
- Language: English

Barbara Walters: Tell Me Everything is a 2025 American documentary film, directed and produced by Jackie Jesko. It follows the life and career of Barbara Walters. Ron Howard and Brian Grazer serve as executive producers under their Imagine Documentaries banner.

It had its world premiere at the Tribeca Festival on June 12, 2025, and was released on June 23, 2025, by Hulu.

== Premise ==
Explores the life and career of Barbara Walters told with archive footage and interviews with Cindy Adams, Joy Behar, Connie Chung, Martin Clancy, Andy Cohen, Katie Couric, Peter Gethers, Lori Klein, Cynthia McFadden, Bette Midler, Victor Neufeld, David Sloan, Katie Nelson Thomson, Chris Vlasto and Oprah Winfrey.

== Production ==
In June 2024, it was announced Jackie Jesko would direct a documentary revolving around Barbara Walters with ABC News Studios producing alongside Imagine Documentaries and Hulu distributing.

== Release ==
It made its world premiere at the Tribeca Festival on June 12, 2025. It will also screen at DC/DOX Film Festival on June 14, 2025. It was released on June 23, 2025, by Hulu.

== Reception ==
On the review aggregator website Rotten Tomatoes, 100% of 13 critics' reviews are positive. Metacritic, which uses a weighted average, assigned the film a score of 65 out of 100, based on 6 critics, indicating "generally favorable" reviews.

Owen Gleiberman of Variety wrote, "Barbara Walters Tell Me Everything is a documentary a lot like its subject. It's sharp and inquiring in a playful way. It asks friendly questions but knows just when to toss in a tough one. It sizes up important people with clear-eyed worldly perception, but it's also enthralled by the seductions of fame and money and power."

Daniel Fienberg of The Hollywood Reporter wrote, "The conceit of letting Walters' own interview tactics steer the documentary isn't a bad one, but as executed here, it isn't interesting either, which is a pity since Walters was absolutely interesting."
