= In Her Name =

2022 coming-of-age film

In Her Name is a 2022 coming-of-age comedy-drama film written and directed by Sarah Carter in her directorial debut. The film follows estranged sisters forced to confront the misery that has become their lives while dealing with their egomaniacal, formerly-important-artist father's descent.

In Her Name had its world premiere at Tribeca Film Festival in 2022, where it won an Audience Award. The film has gone on to screen at festivals around the world, and will be distributed in June 2024 by Tribeca Films, Giant Pictures, and Drafthouse.
