= Baby/girls =

2026 American documentary film

baby/girls
- Directed by: Jackie Jesko; Alyse Walsh
- Produced by: Kelly Rohrbach Walton; Melissa Leardi; Alex Waterfield
- Cinematography: Cassandra Giraldo
- Edited by: Daniela I. Quiroz
- Music by: T. Griffin; Dash Hammerstein
- Production companies: Maybe? Productions; Latchkey Films
- Release date: March 12, 2026 (South by Southwest)
- Running time: 94 minutes
- Country: United States
- Language: English

baby/girls is a 2026 American documentary film co-directed by Jackie Jesko and Alyse Walsh. The documentary follows the lives of three teenage mothers living in a Christian maternity home in rural Arkansas, following the 2022 Dobbs decision.

== Premise ==
baby/girls documents the lives of Olivia, Grace, and Ariana, teenage mothers living in Arkansas raising children following the 2022 Dobbs decision, which overturned constitutional protections previously established by Roe v. Wade. The girls are based in a Christian maternity home in Arkansas called Compassion House. The documentary follows their pregnancies, births, and experiences through the postpartum period, celebrating these women raising children, while critiquing the "failing" systems that are in place to help them, including the late teachings of sexual education in public schools and the rising costs of daycare preventing the pursuit of careers.

baby/girls was filmed over a period of two years, utilizing one-on-one interviews and an "omnipresent" camera. The documentary interviews the teenage mothers at the center of the film, their friends and families, and workers at Compassion House.

== History ==
The film debuted at the 2026 South by Southwest Film Festival and would later be screened at the Bentonville Film Festival. Following the film's initial screening at the Brentonville Film Festival, a panel of healthcare providers, advocates, and the film's directors discussed teen pregnancy in Arkansas and resources for new parents. The documentary continued to be screened in Arkansas, with showings in Fayetteville, Springdale, and Rogers.

In November 2026, baby/girls was screened as part of DOC NYC.

=== Campaign ===
In addition to the full-length documentary, the film was edited down to screen as an "educational 40-minute version", which is shown in schools, community centers, and churches for free. The film also has an impact campaign, supporting nonprofits focusing on young mothers and other organizations supporting similar causes.
