= Steuart Walton =

American attorney and businessman (born 1981)

- Born: April 1981 (age 45); Bentonville, Arkansas, U.S.
- Education: University of Colorado Boulder; Georgetown University Law Center (JD)
- Occupations: Attorney; businessman
- Spouse: Kelly Rohrbach (m. 2019)
- Children: 1
- Parents: Jim Walton (father); Lynne McNabb (mother)
- Relatives: Sam Walton (paternal grandfather); Helen Walton (paternal grandmother); S. Robson Walton (paternal uncle); John T. Walton (paternal uncle); Alice Walton (paternal aunt)

Steuart Walton (born 1981) is an American attorney and businessman. Born into the billionaire Walton family, he is a director of Walmart, the world's largest company by revenue, co-founder of private equity firm RZC Investments, which bought British cycling brand Rapha in 2017, and founder of Game Composites, a composite aircraft manufacturer.

== Early life ==
Walton was born in 1981 in Bentonville, Arkansas. He is the son of Lynne McNabb and Jim Walton, a former director of Walmart. His paternal grandfather, Sam Walton, was the founder of Walmart.

Walton graduated from the University of Colorado Boulder with a degree in business administration. He earned a Juris Doctor degree from the Georgetown University Law Center.

== Career ==
In 2004, Walton worked for Republican Senator Peter Fitzgerald. He subsequently worked for a law firm in Santiago, Chile. From 2007 to 2010, Walton was a lawyer at Allen & Overy.

Afterward, Walton worked in Walmart's mergers and acquisitions division, as well as the company's Carnaby Street office in London. He left Walmart in 2013 to found a company. Walton, who is also a pilot, in 2013 founded Game Composites, a composite aircraft manufacturer in Northwest Arkansas, and serves as its chairman.

Walton joined the board of Walmart on June 3, 2016.

Walton and his brother, Tom Walton, co-founded an investment company, RZC Investments. The company bought a majority stake of British bikewear business Rapha in August 2017, in addition to investing in road-bike maker Allied Cycle Works.

== Philanthropy ==
Walton and his brother, Tom Walton, who are mountain biking enthusiasts, were influential in the Walton Family Foundation's US$15 million charitable contribution to establish the Razorback Regional Greenway in 2015. In 2016, they also played a role in the foundation's US$20,000 donation for the expansion of a garden at the Samaritan Community Center in Bentonville.

Walton helped Bentonville, Arkansas, become host city for the 2016 International Mountain Bicycling Association World Summit. Also in 2016, Steuart and Tom Walton launched the Innovation Competition to focus on healthy living and strong downtowns in Benton County, Arkansas.

Walton sits on the boards of directors of the Crystal Bridges Museum of American Art, Smithsonian National Air and Space Museum, and Leadership for Educational Equity.

Through their work with Crystal Bridges Museum of American Art, Steuart and Tom Walton oversaw a project renovating a 63,000-square-foot former Kraft cheese plant in Bentonville into "The Momentary," exhibit space for contemporary art, music, theater and film.

Walton spoke at the 2016 Aspen Ideas Festival about the benefits of bike trails.

In 2017, Walton and the Walton Family Foundation granted $787,000 to six Benton County cities to increase and diversify the region's tree canopy. The program allows the cities to plant large trees near trails, highways, parks, and other public places.

== Political activity ==
In 2012, Walton donated US$299,500 to Keep Dollars in Benton County, an organization that advocated for the successful effort to allow retailers to sell alcohol in Benton County, Arkansas.

== Personal life ==
In 2019, Walton married actress and model Kelly Rohrbach.

Walton is a pilot and owns numerous warbirds including a Goodyear F2G Corsair and several North American P-51 Mustangs. In May 2020, Walton led a flyover over numerous cities in Arkansas to honor first responders during the COVID-19 pandemic.
