= Babylon'13 =

Ukrainian documentary filmmakers' association

- Вавилон'13
- Formation: 2013; 12 years ago
- Official language: Ukrainian, Surzhyk, Russian, English

Babylon'13 (Ukrainian: Вавилон'13) is a Ukrainian documentary filmmakers' association founded in 2013. Established to raise awareness of the Maidan protests in Ukraine and oppose Russian propaganda surrounding the Annexation of Crimea, the association has produced more than seven full-length documentaries and over a hundred short web films.

== Films ==
During the Maidan protests, the films of Babylon'13 focused on the large demonstrations and sweeping movements of the revolution. The collective continued to produce films through the 2022 Russian invasion of Ukraine, but shifted its focus to low-tech, small-scale short films that had a much more narrow and grounded focus. These short films, uploaded by individuals and collected by Babylon'13, consist of scenes of life on the ground in Ukraine and seek to provide a different perspective on the conflict. Themes throughout the war have included portraits of brave individuals, as well as insight into often overlooked groups in Ukraine, such as the Roma.

Title	Translated title	Director	Released	Length	Genre	Notes
Maidan		Sergey Loznitza	2014	134 minutes	Documentary	
Winter on Fire: Ukraine’s Fight for Freedom		Evgeny Afineev	2015	102 minutes	Documentary	
Desyat' secund	Ten Seconds	Yuliia Hontaruk	2016	69 minutes	Docudrama	
Zalizni metelyky	Iron Butterflies	Roman Liubyi	2023	84 minutes	Documentary	

== See also ==
- Media portrayal of the Russo-Ukrainian War
