= Chelsea Devantez =

American author, comedian, director

- Born: New Mexico, U.S.
- Education: United World College; NYU Tisch School of the Arts; The Second City
- Occupations: Author, comedian, director, podcaster
- Years active: 2017–present
- Notable work: The Problem with Jon Stewart; Basic
- Spouse: Yassir Lester (m. 2022)
- Website: www.chelsearosedevantez.com

Chelsea Devantez is an American author, comedian, director, and podcaster. Devantez was nominated for an Emmy in 2022 for Outstanding Writing For A Nonfiction Program for The Problem with Jon Stewart where she was Head Writer.

Her television credits include Not Dead Yet, Girls5Eva, Bless This Mess, The Opposition with Jordan Klepper, and The Gong Show.

Her 2024 memoir, I Shouldn't Be Telling You This (But I'm Going To Anyway), was a New York Times Bestseller. Her podcast, Glamorous Trash has over six million downloads.

== Early life and education ==
Chelsea Devantez was raised by a single mom in New Mexico. She studied at the United World College and NYU's Tisch School of the Arts on scholarships. She spent a semester abroad in Chicago's Comedy Studies program at The Second City.

== Career ==
After college, Devantez moved to Chicago and became a Second City regular, which included doing improv shows on cruise ships, touring companies, and on the main stage.

Her first job as a writer on a television series was for an un-aired Jon Stewart animated project.

In March 2020, her short film Basic, premiered at SXSW. In 2026, Devantez returned to SXSW with Basic, the feature film she directed, starring Leighton Meister and Ashley Park.

Devantez launched the podcast, Glamorous Trash: A Celebrity Memoir Podcast in 2020. It was originally called Celebrity Book Club and the first book covered was Mariah Carey's 2020 memoir, The Meaning of Mariah Carey.

In 2021, Devantez put out a call on social media for blind submissions as they were assembling the writers room for the yet-unnamed Jon Stewart project. They received 2400 writers packets. The show launched on Apple TV+ and was called The Problem With Jon Stewart.

Her 2024 memoir, I Shouldn't Be Telling You This (But I'm Going to Anyway), about her journey as a domestic violence survivor, was heavily redacted.

== Personal life ==
Devantez is married to Yassir Lester. They live with their three dogs in California.

== Filmography ==
=== Television ===
Year	Title	Role	Notes
2017	The Opposition with Jordan Klepper	Writer	59 episodes
2018	The Gong Show	Writer	10 episodes
2019	Abby's	Writer	Episode: "The Fish"
2019	Bless This Mess	Writer	Executive story editor (19 episodes), story editor (5 episodes), written by (3 episodes)
2021	Girls5eva	Co-producer	8 episodes; also, written by episode: "Catskills"
2021	The Problem with Jon Stewart	Head writer	8 episodes

=== Film ===
Year	Title	Role	Notes
2020	Basic	Gloria	Short film; also director, writer, and executive producer
2026	Basic		Feature Film

== Awards and nominations ==
Year	Award	Category	Work	Result
2022	Emmy Awards	Outstanding Writing for a Nonfiction Program	The Problem with Jon Stewart	Nominated
