= We Were Here (2026 film) =

2026 Indian short film

- Official poster
- Directed by: Pranav Bhasin
- Written by: Pranav Bhasin
- Produced by: Yash Gonsai
- Starring: Arindol Bagchi; Devendra Dodke; Kalpana Gagdekar
- Cinematography: Rajiv Malu
- Edited by: Pralay Valanju
- Music by: Yash Sahai
- Production companies: Sunshine Motion Pictures; SPLF Media
- Distributed by: The New Yorker
- Release date: March 2026 (SXSW)
- Running time: 10 minutes
- Country: India
- Languages: Hindi; English

We Were Here is a 2026 Indian short comedy-drama film written and directed by Pranav Bhasin. Set in a small Indian town, it follows three retirees, who are certain that machines are stealing human jobs, so they mount a protest by posing as household appliances.

The film was screened at the 2026 South by Southwest Film & TV Festival in March 2026, where it won Narrative Short Film competition award and Redbreast Unhidden Award.

== Cast ==
- Satish Kashyap as Mr. Bagchi
- Devendra Dodke as Mr. Pimple
- Arindol Bagchi as Mr. Ganguli
- Shubham Kujur as Pimple's Son
- Kalpana Gagdekar as Mrs. Bagchi
- Yash Gonsai as Store Manager

== Production ==
Aarti Lohia (SPLF Media), Priyanka Chopra Jonas (Purple Pebble Pictures) and activist-playwright V, formerly known as Eve Ensler, have joined Andrew Scott as executive producers of the film.

== Release ==
We Were Here was screened in Comedy Shorts: Anxious/Attachments of the 62nd Chicago International Film Festival on 16 October.

The New Yorker has acquired the film and will premiere it on its YouTube channels.

== Awards ==
Award	Date	Category	Status	Ref
SXSW	2026	Audience Award for Short Narrative	Won	
SXSW	2026	RedBreast Unhidden Award	Won	
Palm Springs International ShortFest	2026	Best Live-Action Short Film Under 15 Minutes	Won	
Palm Springs International ShortFest	2026	Best Comedy Short	Won	
