= Jackie Jesko =

American film director, producer, and journalist

- Occupations: Film director, producer, journalist
- Years active: 2011–present

Jackie Jesko is an American film director, producer, and journalist. Jesko has worked on Vice on both iterations on HBO and Showtime. She has additionally worked on projects for Vice TV. In 2023, she directed and produced Savior Complex for HBO.

== Career ==
Jesko started out at ABC News, producing investigative stories for Nightline. Jesko worked on both iterations of Vice for HBO and Showtime, serving as a producer on the episodes After the Fall, The Battle for Idlib and India Burning, which won the James Foley Award for Courage in Journalism, OPC Edward R. Murrow Award, and Alfred I. duPont–Columbia University Award respectively.

Jesko is the co-founder of Latchkey Films, a production company focusing on non-fiction storytelling. She served as a producer on Between Life & Death: Terri Schiavo's Story for MSNBC Films, and Demons and Saviors for Hulu.

In 2023, Jesko directed and produced Savior Complex for HBO, revolving around Serving His Children and its founder, Renee Bach.

In 2025, Jesko directed and produced Barbara Walters: Tell Me Everything for ABC News Studios/Hulu, revolving around the life and career of Barbara Walters. It had its world premiere at the Tribeca Festival on June 12, 2025, and was released on June 23, 2025, by Hulu.

In 2026, Jesko co-directed the documentary film, baby/girls. The film followed the lives of three teenage mothers in rural Arkansas, debuting at the South by Southwest Film Festival.

== Filmography ==
=== Film ===
Year	Title	Director	Producer	Notes	Ref.
2025	Barbara Walters: Tell Me Everything	Yes	Yes		
2026	baby/girls	Yes	No		

=== Television ===
Year	Title	Director	Producer	Notes	Ref.
2014–2017	ABC News Nightline	No	Yes	3 episodes	
2018	Vice	No	Yes	5 episodes	
2020	Fringe Nation	Yes	Yes	Episode: "The Legacy of the KKK"	
2023	Savior Complex	Yes	Yes	3 episodes	
2023	Between Life & Death: Terry Schiavo's Story	No	Executive	TV Documentary	
2023	Demons and Saviors	No	Yes	3 episodes	

== Awards and nominations ==
Organizations	Year	Category	Work	Result	Ref.
News and Documentary Emmy Awards	2015	Outstanding Coverage of a News Story	ABC News Nightline ("The Ebola Crisis")	Nominated	
News and Documentary Emmy Awards	2015	Outstanding Hard News Report in a Regularly Scheduled Newscast	ABC News Nightline ("The Gates of Hell")	Nominated	
News and Documentary Emmy Awards	2015	Best Story in a Regularly Scheduled Newscast	ABC News Nightline ("The Ebola Crisis")	Nominated	
News and Documentary Emmy Awards	2017	Outstanding Investigative Report in a Newscast	ABC News Nightline ("Daughters for Sale")	Nominated	
News and Documentary Emmy Awards	2018	Outstanding Feature Story in a Newscast	ABC News Nightline ("Femicide: The Untold War")	Nominated	
News and Documentary Emmy Awards	2021	Outstanding Feature Story in a News Magazine	Vice Investigates	Won	
