= Bitconned =

2024 Cryptocurrency documentary

- Directed by: Bryan Storkel
- Written by: Jonathan Ignatius Green
- Production company: Netflix
- Release date: January 1, 2024 (location)

Bitconned is a true crime documentary film released by Netflix on January 1, 2024. The film was directed by Bryan Storkel.

The film follows the three founders of Centra Tech as they raise more than $32 million in a fraudulent initial coin offering.

The documentary is being adapted by the film's producers into a podcast series called Creating a Con: The Story Behind Bitconned.

== Reception ==
On review aggregator Rotten Tomatoes, the film holds an approval rating of 100% based on 10 reviews.
