= Dave LaMattina =

American filmmaker

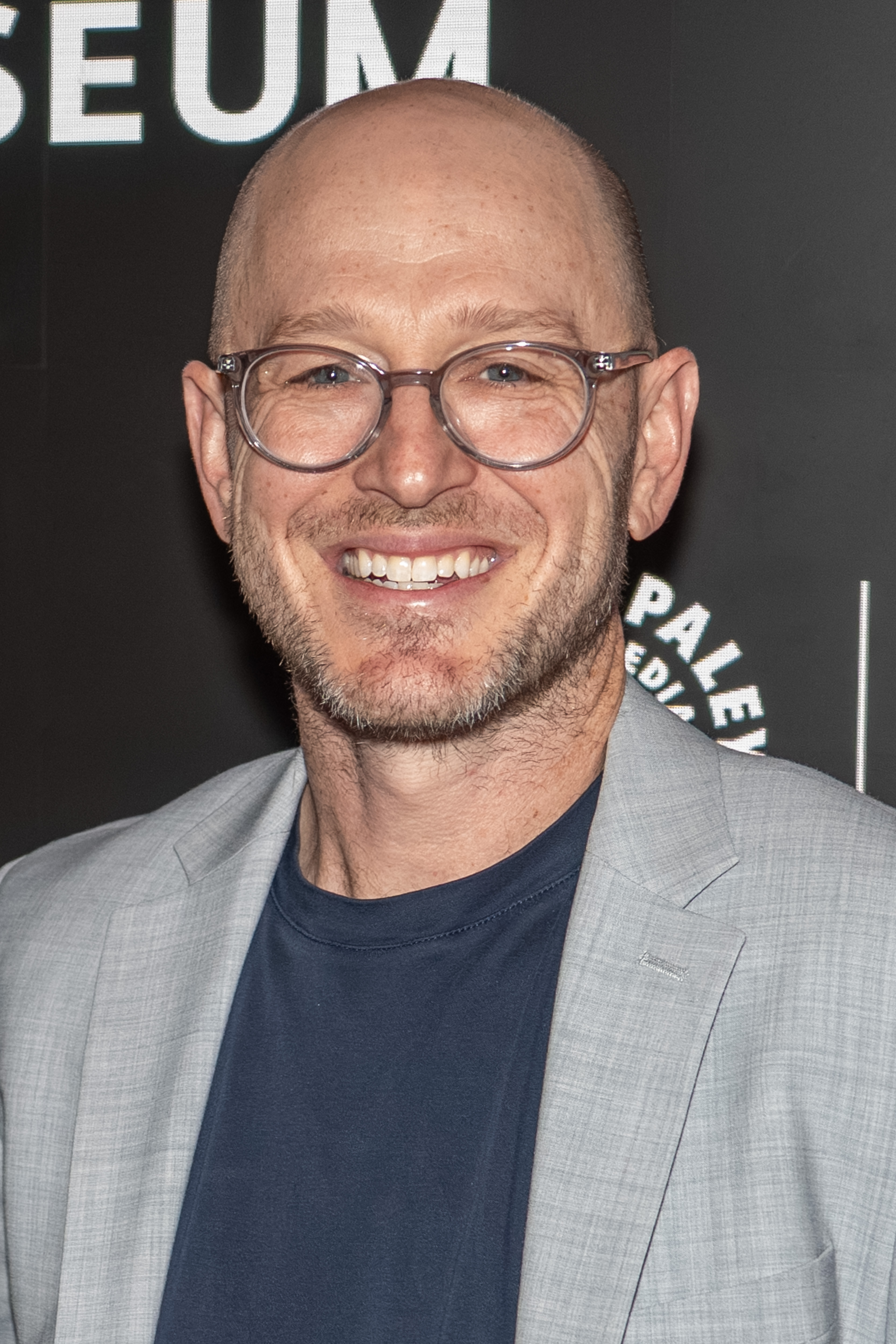
- LaMattina in 2026
- Born: Dave LaMattina; December 29, 1980 (age 45); Ledyard, CT, United States
- Occupations: Director, producer, writer
- Years active: 2008–present

Dave LaMattina is an American filmmaker. He is best known as the director/producer of the documentaries Summer of 94, Don Bluth: Somewhere Out There and I Am Big Bird: The Caroll Spinney Story, as well as being the creator and executive producer of The Zoo franchise, all of which he did alongside longtime creative partner Chad Walker.

== Career ==
LaMattina's first job in the film industry was at Blue Sky Studios, where he was assistant to the directors on the film Horton Hears a Who! It was while working at Blue Sky where he met Walker, who at the time was a production assistant on Ice Age: The Meltdown.

In 2010, LaMattina & Walker made their directorial debut with the documentary Brownstones to Red Dirt, which captured the relationships that develop between children in Bedford–Stuyvesant, Brooklyn and their pen pals in Freetown, Sierra Leone. The film became a fundraising tool for Schools for Salone, raising enough money to build a primary school in Freetown. LaMattina and Walker returned to work in Sierra Leone to shoot two short documentaries: Kei, about Kei Kamara, the second all-time leading scorer in Major League Soccer, and Aunty, which profiled a remarkable headmistress.

In 2014, LaMattina and Walker premiered I Am Big Bird: The Caroll Spinney Story at Hot Docs Canadian International Documentary Festival. The film earned an 84% Fresh rating on Rotten Tomatoes, and was awarded the Audience Choice Award for the Best Documentary at Cinéfest Sudbury International Film Festival. Tribeca Film acquired the documentary, releasing it theatrically and on demand in 2015.

While on the festival circuit with I Am Big Bird, LaMattina and Walker also released We Must Go, a documentary about the Egyptian national soccer team's quest to qualify for the 2014 World Cup. The film featured Mohamed Salah, Mohamed Aboutrika and American coach Bob Bradley.

2016 saw LaMattina and Walker continue their work in soccer stories with Exploring Planet Futbol, a series they created for Sports Illustrated which featured journalist James Piotr Montague. Over the course of three weeks, the trio traversed Africa from Algeria to Rwanda to Lesotho to Botswana to see how soccer reflected the people and places where it is played.

In 2017, LaMattina and Walker launched The Zoo, which they created and executive produced. Featuring the day-to-day lives of the people and animals at the Bronx Zoo, it was followed by spinoffs The Zoo: San Diego and The Aquarium.

LaMattina and Walker returned to the world of animation with their film Don Bluth: Somewhere Out There. The documentary profiles Don Bluth, the filmmaker behind the films An American Tail, The Land Before Time, Anastasia, the video game Dragon's Lair and more. The documentary premiered at the Savannah Film Festival in October 2025 and will be released in 2026. The film features an original score by Fergal Lawler of the cranberries.

2026 marked the release of Summer of 94, a documentary about the 1994 World Cup campaign of the U.S. Men's National Soccer Team. LaMattina and Walker directed and produced the film, alongside their partners at Stand Together, Cookie Jar & a Dream Studios, Imagine Entertainment and Delirio Films. The documentary was executive produced by Brian Grazer and Ron Howard. The film premiered at SXSW before airing nationwide on Fox.

== Personal life ==
LaMattina graduated with a degree in communications from Boston College. While there, he received a grant from the Jacques Salmanowitz Program for Moral Courage in Documentary Film, which enabled him to direct and produce a documentary about child AIDS activist Nkosi Johnson. He earned his MFA from the University of Southern California's School of Cinematic Arts.

In 2007, he co-founded the production company Copper Pot Pictures with Chad Walker and Clay Frost.

== Filmography ==
Year	Film	Role	Genre	Ref.
2008	Horton Hears a Who!	Director assistant	Film	
2009	Ice Age: Dawn of the Dinosaurs	Additional production support	Film	
2010	Brownstones to Red Dirt	Director, producer, writer	Documentary	
2011	Rio	Additional production manager, script coordinator	Film	
2012	Kei	Director, producer, writer	Documentary short	
2013	Epic	Production coordinator	Film	
2014	I Am Big Bird: The Caroll Spinney Story	Director, producer, writer	Documentary	
2014	We Must Go	Director, producer, writer	Documentary	
2016	Exploring Planet Futbol	Director, producer, writer	Documentary Series	
2017–21	The Zoo	Executive producer	TV series	
2019-22	The Zoo: San Diego	Executive producer	TV series	
2019-22	The Aquarium	Executive producer	TV series	
2019	La Gran Madre	Director, producer, writer	Documentary	
2019	Aunty	Director, producer, writer	Documentary short	
2025	Don Bluth: Somewhere Out There	Director, producer, writer	Documentary	
2026	Summer of 94	Director, producer, writer	Documentary	
