= Silver State South Solar Project =

Photovoltaic power plant located in Clark County, Nevada,

- Country: United States
- Location: Clark County
- Coordinates: 35°36′37″N 115°20′06″W
- Status: Operational
- Construction began: September 3, 2014
- Commission date: December 9, 2016
- Owner: NextEra Energy Resources

Solar farm
- Type: Flat-panel PV single-axis tracking
- Site area: 2,900 acres (1,200 ha)

Power generation
- Nameplate capacity: 250 MW_{AC}
- Capacity factor: 31.6% (average 2017-2019)
- Annual net output: 692 GW·h, 239 MW·h/acre

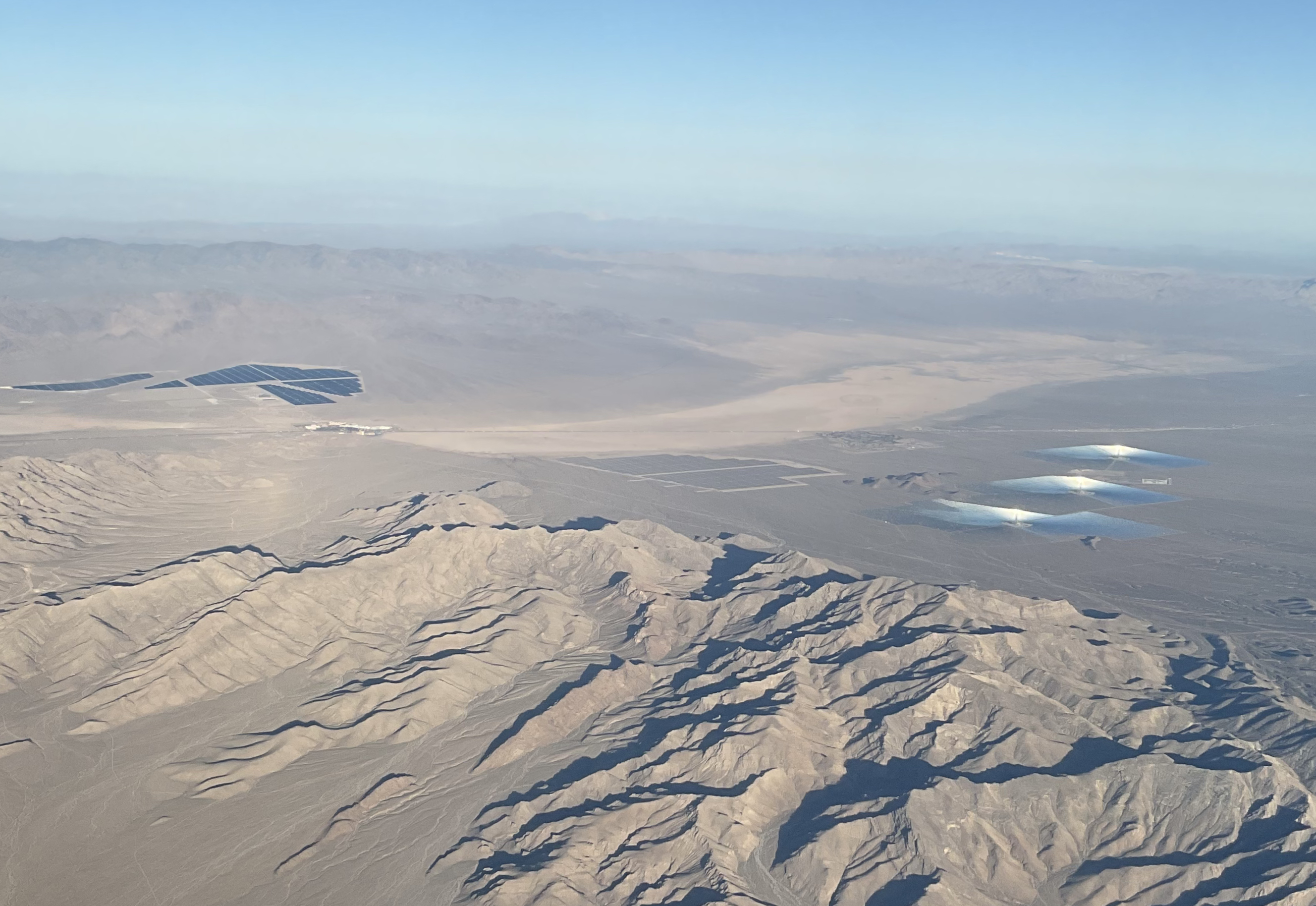
The Silver State South Solar Project (left), with the Ivanpah Solar Power Facility to its right

The Silver State South Solar Project is a 250 megawatt (MW_{AC}) photovoltaic power plant located in Clark County, Nevada, and near the previously completed 50 MW_{AC} Silver State North Solar Project and the 530 MW gas-fired Higgins Generating Station. The project was completed in late 2016 and was constructed by subcontractors for First Solar. The plant is owned and operated by a subsidiary of NextEra Energy Resources, and power is being sold to Southern California Edison.

== Electricity Production ==
Generation (MW·h) of Silver State Solar Power South
Year	Jan	Feb	Mar	Apr	May	Jun	Jul	Aug	Sep	Oct	Nov	Dec	Total
2015											384	8,211	8,595
2016	13,533	23,351	29,167	45,956	62,921	61,971	66,962	71,718	63,439	51,756	39,479	28,335	558,588
2017	29,556	32,848	56,693	62,421	69,859	73,677	71,278	78,328	73,826	71,825	46,787	44,062	711,159
2018	33,729	43,256	55,401	69,164	73,144	85,662	72,966	73,783	70,975	55,643	43,498	33,672	710,894
2019	34,522	37,774	52,251	61,824	65,523	72,168	72,876	70,959	60,663	58,888	40,185	27,138	654,772
Average Annual Production (years 2017-2019) --->													692,275

== Location ==
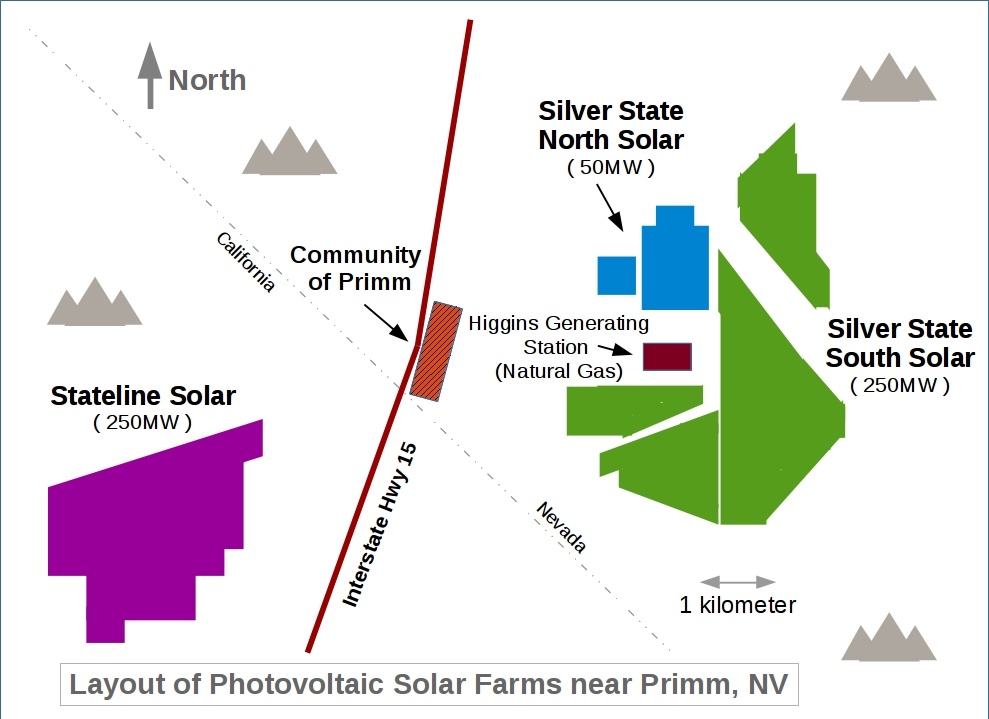
Layout of the project near Primm, NV

The project occupies approximately 2,900 acres of public lands and is located adjacent to Primm, Nevada, in the Jean Lake/Roach Lake Special Recreation Management Area (SRMA).

== See also ==
- Solar power in Nevada
- List of power stations in Nevada
