= Christy Walton =

American billionaire heiress

- Born: Christy Ruth Tallant; February 8, 1949 (age 77); Jackson, Wyoming, U.S.
- Occupation: Heiress
- Known for: Walton family fortune, philanthropy
- Spouse: John T. Walton
- Children: Lukas Walton

Christy Ruth Walton (née Tallant; born February 8, 1949) is an American billionaire heiress and philanthropist. She is the widow of John T. Walton, who was one of the sons of the Walmart founder Sam Walton.

In June 2005, her husband died in a homebuilt ultralight plane crash, making her the main heir to his fortune of US$18.2 billion. Forbes listed Christy Walton as the richest woman in the world for several years. Her net worth was estimated to $41.7 billion in March 2015, the bulk of which came from her shares in Walmart, but also from First Solar, in which her husband had invested. In November 2015, an analysis of court documents by Bloomberg revealed that the bulk of her husband's wealth had been transferred to her son, Lukas Walton, resulting in an estimated net worth of approximately US$5 billion.

== Early life ==
Walton was born in Wyoming to Lewis and Doris Tallant (née Boldes).

== Philanthropy ==
Profiled by Condé Nast Portfolio magazine in The Giving Index, she is ranked as the highest female philanthropist according to the amount she gives as a percentage of her wealth. At a then estimated $16.3 billion net worth, she contributed a total of $3.5 billion cumulatively between 2002 and 2006.

Non-profit organizations in which Walton is actively serving include the national association of trustees and staff, corporate giving officers, and individual donors of The Philanthropy Roundtable. The San Diego Natural History Museum, where she is a board member, as well as the San Diego Zoological Society and the Mingei International Museum are also institutions to which she makes donations. In 2006, Walton donated her own old Victorian home which was built in 1896 for former National City, California postmaster Oliver Noyes and is of historical significance, to the International Community Foundation - Center for Cross-Border Philanthropy. Since her donation, she has endowed $4 million toward the edifice's preservation.

Additionally, she supports her family's own charitable foundation, the Walton Family Charitable Support Foundation, which prioritizes education and benefits institutions of higher education such as the Sam M. Walton College of Business at the University of Arkansas, and several other colleges, community trusts, universities and foundations. In 2007, her family's foundation donated as much as $1.6 billion.

Variety reported on March 2, 2009 that Christy Walton had set up a production company called Tenaja Productions to finance a film adaptation of Bless Me, Ultima, a popular Chicano coming of age novel. Filming wrapped in Santa Fe, New Mexico in late 2010. The film premiered at the Plaza Theatre in El Paso, Texas on September 17, 2012, and received a general release in February 2013.

== Politics ==
Walton donated $52,500 in support of Jon Huntsman 2012 presidential campaign. Walton backed The Lincoln Project, an anti-Trump super-PAC, which ran ads in battleground states. She donated $20,000 to The Lincoln Project in January 2020 and a further $10,000 in May 2020. Walton backed No Kings Day, a nationwide anti-Trump protest on June 14, 2025, placing a full-page ad in The New York Times to promote it.

== See also ==
- Walton family, whose net worth is about US$240.6 billion
