= Michael Ahearn =

Michael Ahearn may refer to:

- Mike Ahearn (Michael F. Ahearn, 1878–1948), athletic director and football coach at Kansas State University
- Michael J. Ahearn (born 1956/7), CEO of First Solar
