= Bless Me, Ultima (film) =

- Film poster
- Directed by: Carl Franklin
- Screenplay by: Carl Franklin
- Based on: Bless Me, Ultima by Rudolfo Anaya
- Produced by: Jesse Beaton; Sarah DiLeo; Mark Johnson
- Starring: Luke Ganalon; Míriam Colón; Benito Martinez; Dolores Heredia; Cástulo Guerra; Alfred Molina; James Victor
- Cinematography: Paula Huidobro
- Edited by: Alan Heim
- Music by: Mark Kilian
- Production companies: Gran Via Productions; Monarch Pictures; Monkey Hill Films; Tenaja Productions
- Distributed by: Arenas Entertainment
- Release dates: September 17, 2012 (Plaza Theatre); February 22, 2013 (U.S.)
- Running time: 106 minutes
- Country: United States
- Language: English
- Box office: $1,553,826

Bless Me, Ultima is a 2012 American coming-of-age drama film written and directed by Carl Franklin, based on the 1972 novel by Rudolfo Anaya. It stars Luke Ganalon, Míriam Colón, Benito Martinez, Dolores Heredia, Cástulo Guerra, Alfred Molina and James Victor in his final film role.

== Plot ==
The social-psychological maturation of a Hispano, living on the eastern plains of New Mexico during the 1940s. The novel begins with Ultima, a curandera, or folk healer, going to live with the Márez family during the summer. Antonio is preoccupied with and anxious about attending school and having to be separated from his mother. Related to these concerns is his engrossment with knowing his destiny. This concern is exacerbated by his mother's desire that he become a priest to a community of farmers, where her family lives. At the same time, Antonio is concerned about realizing the wandering desire that stems from his paternal lineage.

Antonio is nearly at the point of starting religious study for his first holy communion and is becoming concerned with good and evil in the world. Early in the novel, he witnesses the killing of Lupito, a war veteran, and fears that his father may be punished by God for being with the guys who killed Lupito. Antonio is deeply concerned about the fate of Lupito's soul.

As the plot develops, Antonio's fears and concerns intensify and become woven together as he struggles to understand the events surrounding his life. He becomes preoccupied with questions about his destiny, life and death, and good and evil. Ultima conveys an indigenous viewpoint to him that provides guidance when he loses confidence in parental viewpoints and the teachings of the Church. Ultima tells him the stories and legends of his ancestors, and he comes to understand how the history of his people stirs his blood. Through her, Antonio learns the "old ways" and develops a new relationship with nature. This relationship opens him to the contemplation of the possibility of other gods.

Antonio learns there are powers in the world that differ from those honored by the Catholic faith. He helps Ultima perform a healing that saves the life of his Uncle Lucas, who had been bewitched by the Trementina sisters. Later, he witnesses another healing performed by Ultima and begins to understand the world differently; he learns to overcome his fears, especially his fear of change. In the end, Antonio understands himself and the world around him better, and he learns to accept life and the many challenges that it presents.

== Cast ==
- Luke Ganalon as Antonio
- Míriam Colón as Ultima
- Benito Martinez as Gabriel
- Dolores Heredia as Maria
- Cástulo Guerra as Tenorio
- Alfred Molina as voice of Antonio
- Joaquín Cosío as Narciso
- Manuel Garcia-Rulfo as Uncle Pedro
- Reko Moreno as Uncle Lucas
- Luis Bordonada as Uncle Juan
- Joseph A. Garcia as Uncle Mateo
- James Victor as Antonio's Grandfather
- Raúl Castillo as Andrew
- Miguel Gomez as Eugene
- Bernardo Saracino as Lupito
- David Rees Snell as Father Byrnes
- Hemky Madera as Chavez

== Production ==
Variety reported on March 2, 2009 that Christy Walton, heiress to the Walton fortune, had set up Tenaja Productions company solely to finance a film adaptation of Bless Me, Ultima. Monkey Hill Films' Sarah DiLeo is billed as producer with collaboration and support from Mark Johnson of Gran Via Productions and Jesse B. Franklin of Monarch Pictures. Carl Franklin was hired as the writer and director. Walton and DiLeo shared a passion for the book, and the latter had succeeded in convincing Anaya to agree to the adaptation over six years earlier.

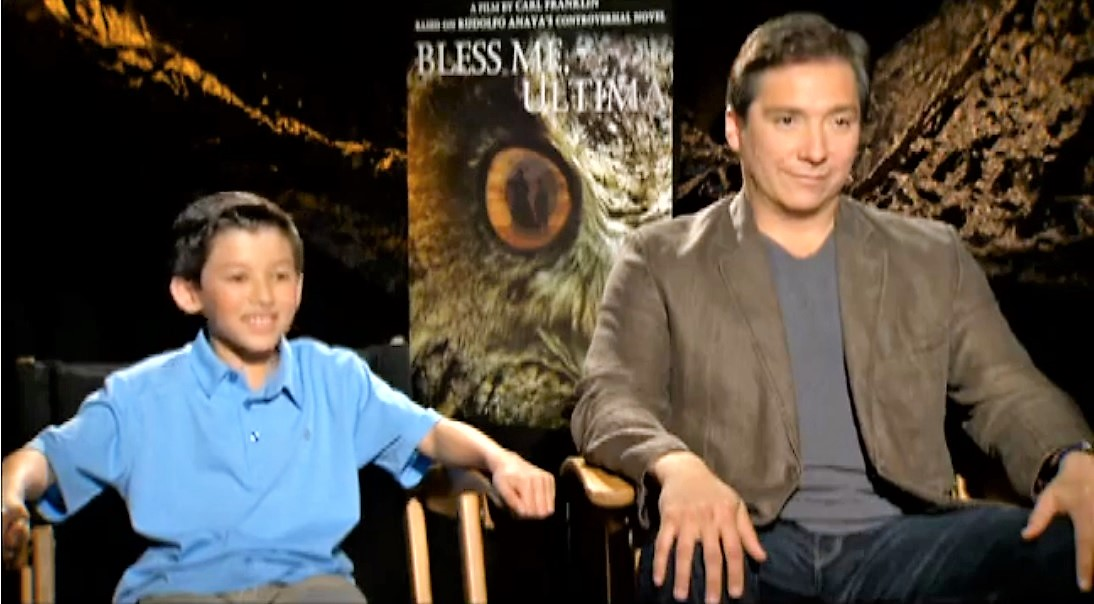
Luke Ganalon (left) and Benito Martinez (right) interviewed about Bless Me, Ultima in 2013.

Shooting was scheduled in the Albuquerque, New Mexico area, and then resumed in Santa Fe for some interiors at Garson Studios on the Santa Fe University of Art and Design campus during the last week in October 2010. Filming wrapped in Santa Fe, New Mexico in late 2010. The film credits thank The College of Santa Fe, Ruby Ranch, The Pecos River Ranch, Santa Cruz Lake Recreational Area, and Albuquerque. Locations include Albuquerque, New Mexico; Rowe, New Mexico; Las Vegas, New Mexico; and Santa Fe, New Mexico.

== Release ==
Bless Me, Ultima premiered at the Plaza Theatre in El Paso, Texas on September 17, 2012 and received a general release in February 2013.

== Reception ==
Bless Me, Ultima has a 69% from critics on Rotten Tomatoes based on 35 reviews.
