= New Mexican literature =

Literature of the U.S state of New Mexico

New Mexican literature includes the modern American literature of the U.S state of New Mexico, along with its former Santa Fe de Nuevo México and New Mexico territories. It is influential in English language and Spanish language literatures, and most of its history has been influenced by Native American literature, Spanish literature, Mexican literature, and English literature.

== History ==
Histories in the region date back to the Hispanos of New Mexico chronicling the oral traditions of the Pueblo, Navajo, Apache, and Comanche peoples. One of the earliest mentions of New Mexico was in Nahuatl as "Yancuic Mexico" in the Crónica Mexicayotl. Among the earliest works of New Mexican literature was Gaspar Pérez de Villagrá's 1610 Historia de la Nueva México.

In the 19th century, Western fiction became popular globally, with tales of Geronimo, Pat Garrett, Billy the Kid, and Elfego Baca becoming folklore icons. Other novels written in New Mexico at this time include Ben-Hur: A Tale of the Christ.

During the 20th century, the 1927 novel Death Comes for the Archbishop set in New Mexico was published, and Fabiola Cabeza de Baca Gilbert produced the first English language cookbook to mention New Mexican cuisine. Scholarly works of the 20th century also remain relevant, especially ones related to the works of Angelico Chavez, James Fulton Zimmerman, Evelina Zuni Lucero, and those of Project Y. Authors and writers of the later 20th and early 21st centuries include Rudolfo Anaya, George RR Martin, and Simon Romero.

== As a genre ==
New Mexican literature as a genre often expresses four themes; tourist, priest, dramatist, and local. With a distinctively Hispano, Puebloan, Apache, Navajo, American frontier, Mexican-American, and Chicano expressed worldview.

New Mexican authors of fiction and non-fiction alike make use of these aforementioned themes, and its fiction is categorized as a distinctive genre by the Library of Congress. Screenplays set in the region often to make use of the New Mexican literary motifs, even if they were changed from a prior setting elsewhere.

Books that are considered to be recommended reading for this genre are Bless Me, Ultima by Rudolfo Anaya, Eyes Bottle Dark With a Mouthful of Flowers by Jake Skeets, Night at the Fiestas by Kirstin Valdez Quade, Peel My Love Like an Onion by Ana Castillo, Face of an Angel by Denise Chávez, and Pasó Por Aquí by Gene Rhodes.

== Writers from New Mexico ==
- Lee K. Abbott
- Louise Abeita
- Daniel Abraham
- Rudolfo Anaya
- Ari Aster
- Sheila Black
- Michael Blake
- Jean-Louis Bourgeois
- Charles Bowden
- Steve Brewer
- Fabiola Cabeza de Baca Gilbert
- Gregory Cajete
- Julia Cameron
- Denise Chávez
- Van Deren Coke
- Stanley Crawford
- Genese Davis
- Charles Duhigg
- Chris Eboch
- Max Evans
- Amber Fallon
- Doug Fine
- Ty Franck
- Lois Ellen Frank
- Euell Gibbons
- Drew Goddard
- Joy Harjo
- Fred R. Harris
- Alexander S. Heard
- Mark Heyman
- Tony Hillerman
- Zach Hively
- Paul Andrew Hutton
- Darynda Jones
- Adam Kokesh
- Uma Krishnaswami
- Margaret Larkin
- Aurora Lucero-White Lea
- Susan Shelby Magoffin
- N. Scott Momaday
- Agnes Morley Cleaveland
- Chester Nez
- Steve Pearce
- Donald Edmond Pelotte
- Karl T. Pflock
- Bruce D. Porter
- Martín Prechtel
- Kirstin Valdez Quade
- Joseph Rael
- Eugene Manlove Rhodes
- Simon Romero
- Barry Sadler
- Benjamin Alire Sáenz
- M. H. Salmon
- Jenn Shapland
- Stephen van Dyck
- Sage Walker
- Jack Williamson

== Periodicals ==
=== Newspapers ===
The newspapers of record for New Mexico are the Albuquerque Journal, The Santa Fe New Mexican, and Las Cruces Sun-News.

=== Magazines and journals ===
- Albuquerque the Magazine
- First American Art Magazine
- The Horsemen's Voice
- Journal of Asian Martial Arts
- Local iQ
- Los Alamos Science
- Mothering
- New Mexico Historical Review
- New Mexico Magazine
- New Mexico Wildlife
- Outside
- Puerto del Sol
- Revista Católica
- Soaring
- Stereophile
