= THV =

THV may refer to:

== Science ==
- Tetrahydrocannabivarin, a drug
- A fluorocarbon copolymer (tetrafluoroethylene / hexafluoropropylene / vinylidene fluoride)
- Terrestrial herbaceous vegetation

== Other uses ==
- The Horsemen's Voice, an American periodical
- Ship prefix for Trinity House vessels
