= Harold McMaster =

American inventor, scientist and entrepreneur

Harold A. McMaster
- Born: July 20, 1916; Deshler, Ohio, U.S.
- Died: August 25, 2003 (aged 87); Perrysburg, Ohio, U.S.
- Occupations: Inventor, scientist, and entrepreneur
- Known for: Toughened glass
- Spouse: Helen Clark

Harold A. McMaster (July 20, 1916 – August 25, 2003) was an American inventor with over 100 patents and entrepreneur who founded four companies. Fortune Magazine called him "The Glass Genius". He also worked on developing commercial-scale solar cell technology and developed a new type of engine, the "McMaster Rotary Engine."

McMaster was an inventor early on. His father gave him a set of tools at age 6. By 8, he had built a set of farm machinery, by 10, a threshing machine that husked corn, and by 12 he was making car motors.

Following his graduation from Ohio State with a combined master's degree in physics, mathematics, and astronomy in 1939, McMaster worked as the first research physicist ever employed by the Libbey Owens Ford Glass in Toledo, Ohio. He received his first patent during World War 2 (WWII) for a periscope used by fighter pilots to see behind them.

== Permaglass ==
In 1948, he started his own company, Permaglass, in Genoa, Ohio. Permaglass produced curved and tempered glass for the consumer and automotive markets. Within 3 months, he was producing glass for appliances, and for display cases; within 3 years, Permaglass was a leading manufacturer of glass plates for television sets. As the auto and electronics industries boomed in the 1950s, Permaglass was very successful. McMaster merged Permaglass into Guardian Industries of Detroit, Michigan in 1969, creating the third-largest glass company in the world, and left the company in 1971.

== Glasstech ==
In 1971, with partners Norman Nitschke and Frank Larimer, McMaster started another glass company, Glasstech, which he sold in 1987 for $100 million. Glasstech was not an overnight success; in fact, they filed for bankruptcy protection more than once. However, McMaster, was "recognized as the world's leading authority on tempering glass, that is, compressing glass to add tensile strength" and Glasstech essentially created the market for tempered glass, receiving not only the sticker price, but also a royalty on glass produced, for machines that produce 80% of the world’s automotive glass.

== Solar cells ==
Inspired by a vacation in sunny Arizona, McMaster began another company, Glasstech Solar, in 1984, to produce cost-effective solar arrays. His insight was that the essential cost element of large area solar arrays was glass, and he could treat the actual solar cell as simply a different kind of coating on glass. After doing little except absorbing $12 million cash, McMaster gave up on the amorphous silicon research, offered to pay back the 57 investors who followed him into solar cells. He then raised yet another $15 million to create Solar Cells Inc. in Toledo OH to work on a different thin-film technology, cadmium telluride photovoltaics. By 1997, Solar Cells had a prototype production machine. In 1995, he brought in a new president, and bought still more stock in the company to fund research, although the company had yet to pay a dividend. According to Ken Zweibel, former head of the Thin Film Partnership program at the Department of Energy's National Renewable Energy Laboratory, SCI was clearly the industry leader in thin-film photovoltaic technology. In 1999, True North Partners, LLC purchased controlling interest and renamed the company First Solar LLC.

According to his obituary in the local paper, the Toledo Blade, "Some believe he will be remembered as the "father" of commercial-scale solar energy, having practically handed the needed technology to society on a platter in the 1990s."

== McMaster rotary engine ==
Since the 1940s, McMaster was sketching and tinkering with models, continuously reworking various designs for what has since become the McMaster Rotary Engine (MRE), Patent US2002043238, 'Wobble engine'. His son Ronald started working on the project in the 1970s, and brother Robert joined in after the sale of Solar Cells Inc. in 1999. The engine is shaped like a drum with the same circumference as a basketball, and is claimed to:

- Weigh only one-tenth as much as a current six-cylinder engine
- Have only two moving parts other than a ball valve; eight parts total
- function under water or deep in space

Unlike the Wankel rotary, which has a heavy rotor, the MRE rotor is light wobble plate, promising greater efficiency. In addition to the two-cycle basketball model, work is continuing on a two-cycle engine about the size of a coffee-can that could be built into wheel hubs, and a four-cycle gasoline version, as well as an engine based on a two-part fuel system utilizing gaseous hydrogen and oxygen US2002043238

== Philanthropy ==
The Harold and Helen McMaster Foundation was founded in 1988, and has made contributions to libraries, colleges, universities, museums, and hospitals in Northwest Ohio and Southeast Michigan.

== Awards ==
- Doctor of Science (honorary), Ohio State University
- Doctor of Science (honorary), Defiance College
- Pilgrim Award, Defiance College
- Ohio State University Department of Physics Distinguished Alumni Award
- Ohio Department of Development Entrepreneur of the Year Award, 1998
- National Glass Industry's Phoenix Award
- Engineering and Science Hall of Fame, Dayton
- Ohio Science and Technology Hall of Fame, Columbus.

== Family ==
Harold McMaster was born on a tenant farm near Deshler, Ohio. He met his wife, the former Helen Clark, while both were students at Defiance College in the 1930s. In addition to his widow, he was survived by their four children: Ronald McMaster, Jeanine Dunn, Nancy Cobie, and Alan McMaster. Harold McMaster died in 2003.

== See also ==
- Nutating disc engine
- Stanford R. Ovshinsky
