= 5N Plus =

Canadian materials company

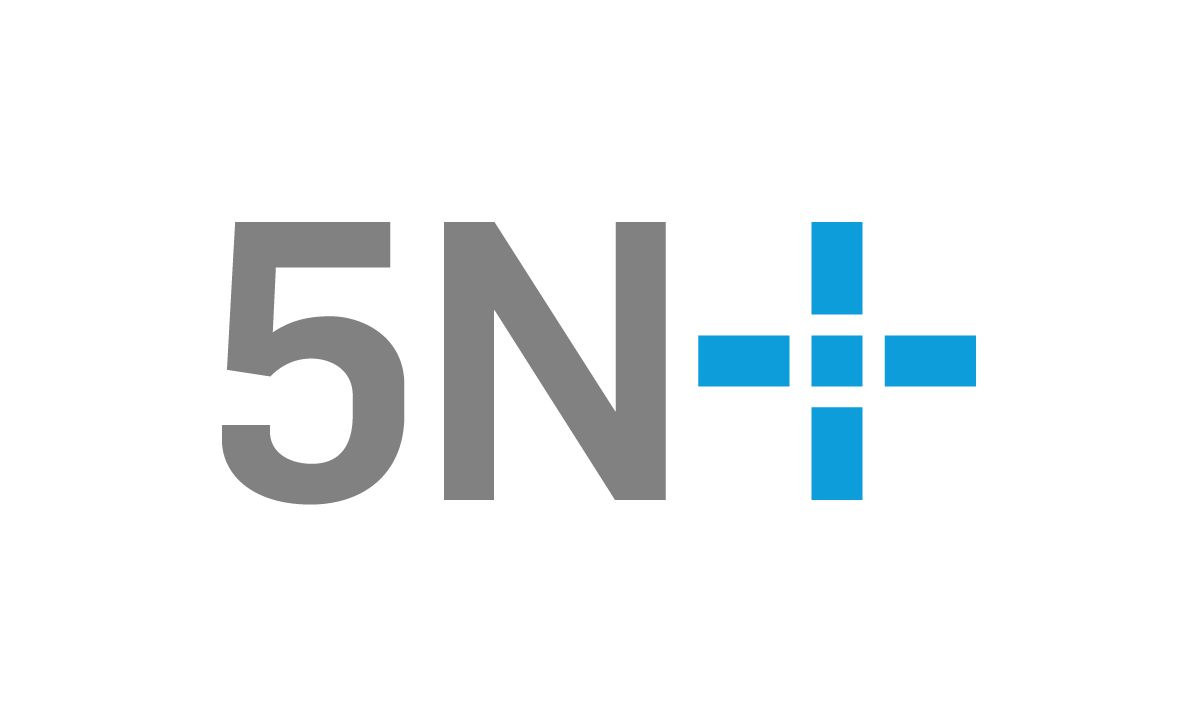
- Type: Public (TSX: VNP)
- Industry: Refining; Recycling
- Founded: Saint-Laurent, Quebec (2000)
- Headquarters: Saint-Laurent, Quebec, Canada
- Area served: Worldwide
- Key people: Luc Bertrand; Chairman of the Board; Jacques L'Écuyer; Founder; Gervais Jacques; President and CEO; Richard Perron; CFO
- Revenue: ▲ C$ 493.2 million (Fiscal 2011)
- Number of employees: 780 (Fiscal 2023)

5N Plus is a Canadian producer of high-purity metals and compounds for electronic applications best known as the major supplier of cadmium telluride (CdTe) to First Solar. The company was founded in 2000 and is headquartered in Saint-Laurent, Quebec, Canada. 5N Plus is a leading producer of specialty metals and chemicals, including high-purity metals such as bismuth, indium, and tellurium, as well as other materials such as cadmium, gallium, and selenium. The company's products are used in a range of applications, including electronics, solar energy, and medical devices. 5N Plus has operations in North America, Europe, and Asia and serves customers around the world.

== Overview ==
5N Plus draws its name from the purity of its products, 99.999% (five nines or 5N) and more. It produces tellurium, cadmium, zinc and related compounds of 5N, 6N and 7N purity, as well as selenium, antimony and bismuth of 5N purity. Its products are critical precursors in a number of electronic applications, including the rapidly expanding thin-film photovoltaic market and to the radiation detector market.

5N Plus is an integrated producer with both primary and secondary refining capabilities.

It sales increased from C$10.3 million for the fiscal year ended May 31, 2005 to C$69.4 million for the fiscal year ended May 31, 2009, representing a compound annual growth rate of 61.1%. During this period, which was characterized by rapid growth and significant expansion of its production capacity, 5N Plus has been able to increase its profitability; its net income grew from $0.9 million to $20.9 million over the same period, representing a CAGR of 119.5%.
