= Bernardo Saracino =

American actor

- Born: New Mexico, U.S.
- Occupation: Actor

Bernardo Saracino is an American actor. He is a native of New Mexico.

== Filmography ==
=== Film ===
Year	Title	Role	Notes
2009	Descansos	Nick	
2010	Passion Play	Father	
2010	Before We Say Goodbye	Miguel Garcia	
2011	A Bird of the Air	Neil	
2011	The Reunion	Armory Guard #1	
2012	Bless Me, Ultima	Lupito	
2014	After the Fall	Loan Officer	
2014	50 to 1	Saeed bin Suroor	
2014	Frontera	Middle Eastern Man	
2015	Sicario	Manuel Diaz	
2015	Dead River	Jaime	
2016	Whiskey Tango Foxtrot	Jaweed's Friend	
2016	Katie Says Goodbye	Rodrigo	
2017	The Space Between Us	Pilot	
2018	Killer in Law	Lt. Mendez	

=== Television ===
Year	Title	Role	Notes
2008	Crash	Carlos	Episode: "Your Ass Belongs to the Gypsies"
2013	Overlook, NM	Alberto De La Paz	Episode: "Special Assembly on Emergency Management"
2013	The Sixth Gun	Juan	Television film
2014	Killer Women	Cartel Leader	Episode: "Queen Bee"
2014	Manhattan	Acevedo	Episode: "You Always Hurt the One You Love"
2015	The Messengers	Cesar Garcia	2 episodes
2016	Dad's House	Dad	Television film
2016	From Dusk till Dawn: The Series	—N/a	2 episodes
2017–2018	Midnight, Texas	Chuy Strong	10 episodes
