= Silver State North Solar Project =

Photovoltaic power station near Primm, Nevada

- Country: United States
- Location: Clark County
- Coordinates: 35°37′36″N 115°21′12″W
- Status: Operational
- Commission date: May 7, 2012
- Owner: First Solar

Solar farm
- Type: Flat-panel PV fixed tilt
- Site area: 600 acres

Power generation
- Nameplate capacity: 60 MW_{p}, 50 MW_{AC}
- Capacity factor: 27.0% (average 2013-2019)
- Annual net output: 118 GW·h, 197 MW·h/acre

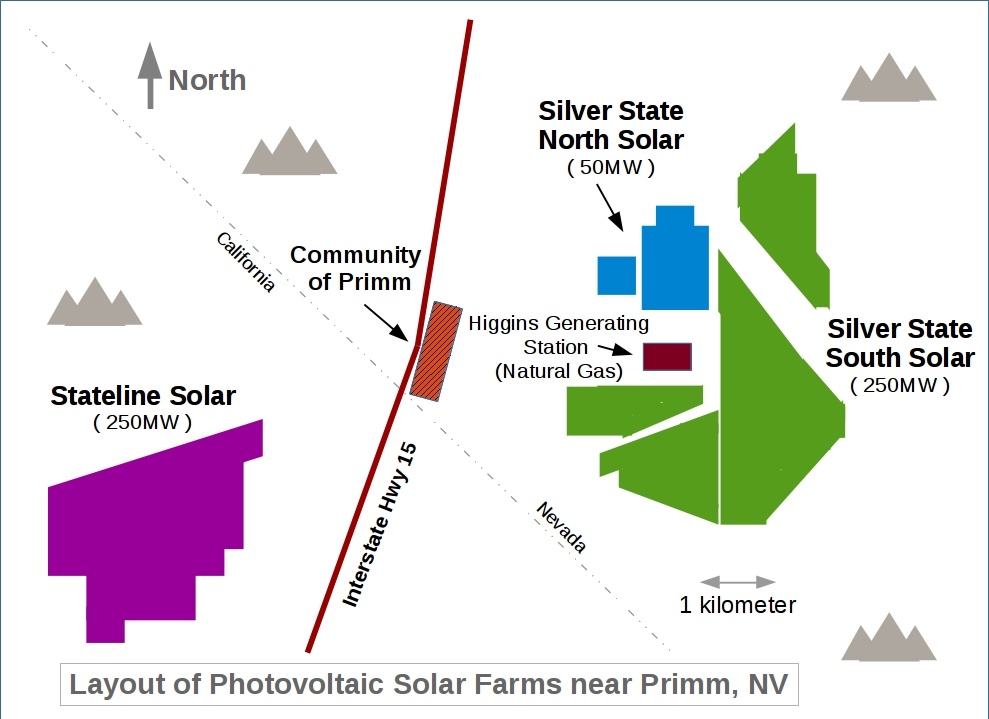
Layout of the project near Primm, NV

Silver State North Solar Project is a 60 MW_{p} (50 MW_{AC}) photovoltaic power station near Primm, Nevada.

== Electricity production ==
Generation (MW·h) of Silver State Solar Power North
Year	Jan	Feb	Mar	Apr	May	Jun	Jul	Aug	Sep	Oct	Nov	Dec	Total
2012				7,098	12,992	12,472	10,838	8,975	9,177	10,877	8,345	6,968	87,742
2013	8,305	8,986	10,653	11,677	12,326	12,064	10,338	10,750	10,247	10,808	7,992	8,102	122,248
2014	8,318	8,463	11,022	11,075	12,119	11,952	10,525	10,906	10,874	10,720	8,893	4,925	119,792
2015	7,504	9,171	10,788	11,778	11,041	11,441	10,804	11,125	10,543	9,340	8,966	7,325	119,826
2016	6,454	9,727	10,252	10,212	11,825	11,440	11,766	11,036	10,636	9,560	8,253	6,385	117,546
2017	4,846	5,386	9,296	10,235	11,455	12,081	11,687	12,843	12,105	11,777	7,671	7,225	116,607
2018	5,601	7,183	9,200	11,486	12,147	14,225	12,117	12,253	11,786	9,240	7,223	5,592	118,054
2019	5,993	6,558	9,072	10,733	11,376	12,529	12,652	12,319	10,539	10,224	6,977	4,712	113,676
Average Annual Production (years 2013–2019) --->													118,250

== See also ==
- Silver State South Solar Project
- Solar power in Nevada
- List of power stations in Nevada
