= True North Venture Partners =

American venture capital firm

- Company type: private
- Industry: venture capital
- Founded: 2011
- Founder: Michael J. Ahearn
- Headquarters: Chicago, Illinois, US
- Key people: Matthew S. Ahearn

True North Venture Partners is an American venture capital firm, based in Chicago, Illinois and Phoenix, Arizona. The founder, managing partner and chairman is Michael J. Ahearn, who is also the co-founder and chairman of First Solar.

== History ==
True North was founded in 2011 with a $300 million fund. The firm's focus is mostly on early stage companies, with investments ranging from $100,000 to $25 million, and geared towards startups across the energy, water, agriculture and waste industries.

Ahearn was a former partner and president of an equity investment firm called JWMA (formerly called True North Partners, LLC), which he started with John T. Walton, son of Walmart founder Sam Walton, in 1996. JWMA Partners was one of the largest holders of First Solar stock, and Walmart invested $25 million in First Solar in 2008.

== See also ==
- First Solar
- John T. Walton
- Lukas Walton
