= John T. Walton =

Vietnam war veteran and a son of Walmart founder (1946–2005)

- Born: October 8, 1946; Newport, Arkansas, U.S.
- Died: June 27, 2005 (aged 58); Jackson, Wyoming, U.S.
- Resting place: Bentonville Cemetery, Bentonville, Arkansas, U.S.
- Spouse(s): Mary Ann Gunn (divorced); Christy Walton
- Children: Lukas Walton
- Parents: Sam Walton (father); Helen Walton (mother)
- Relatives: S. Robson Walton (brother); Jim Walton (brother); Alice Walton (sister); Kelly Rohrbach (niece-in-law); and see Walton family

John Thomas Walton (October 8, 1946 – June 27, 2005) was an American war veteran, businessman and a son of Walmart founder Sam Walton. He was the chairman of True North Venture Partners, a venture capital firm. Walton cofounded the Children's Scholarship Fund, providing tuition scholarships for disadvantaged youth.

== Early life and service in the Vietnam War ==
Walton was born in Newport, Arkansas. He graduated from Bentonville High School where he was a star football player. Walton went on to attend the College of Wooster in Wooster, Ohio. He dropped out of college in 1968 to spend more time playing the flute and enlisted in the U.S. Army (after the Vietnamese Tet Offensive).

During the Vietnam war, Walton served in the Green Berets as part of the Studies and Observations Group. He was involved in combat in the A Shau Valley and in Laos, where he was the medic and the 1-1 (assistant team leader) of a unit named Spike Team Louisiana. Walton later received a Silver Star for bravery in combat.

== Later life ==
After returning from Vietnam, Walton learned to fly and went to work as a pilot for Walmart. He later left the company to fly crop-dusters over cotton fields in several southern states and co-founded Satloc, an aerial application company that pioneered the use of GPS technology in agricultural crop-dusting. Walton then moved to San Diego where he founded Corsair Marine, a company that built trimaran sailboats. He also lived in Durango, Colorado, and was an enthusiastic skier, mountain biker, hiker, motorcycle rider, skydiver and scuba diver.

In 1998, as part of the Philanthropy Roundtable, Walton and friend Ted Forstmann established the Children's Scholarship Fund to provide tuition assistance for low-income families to send their children to private schools. He was an advocate of school vouchers. For his achievements, he received the William E. Simon Prize for Philanthropic Leadership.

== Death ==
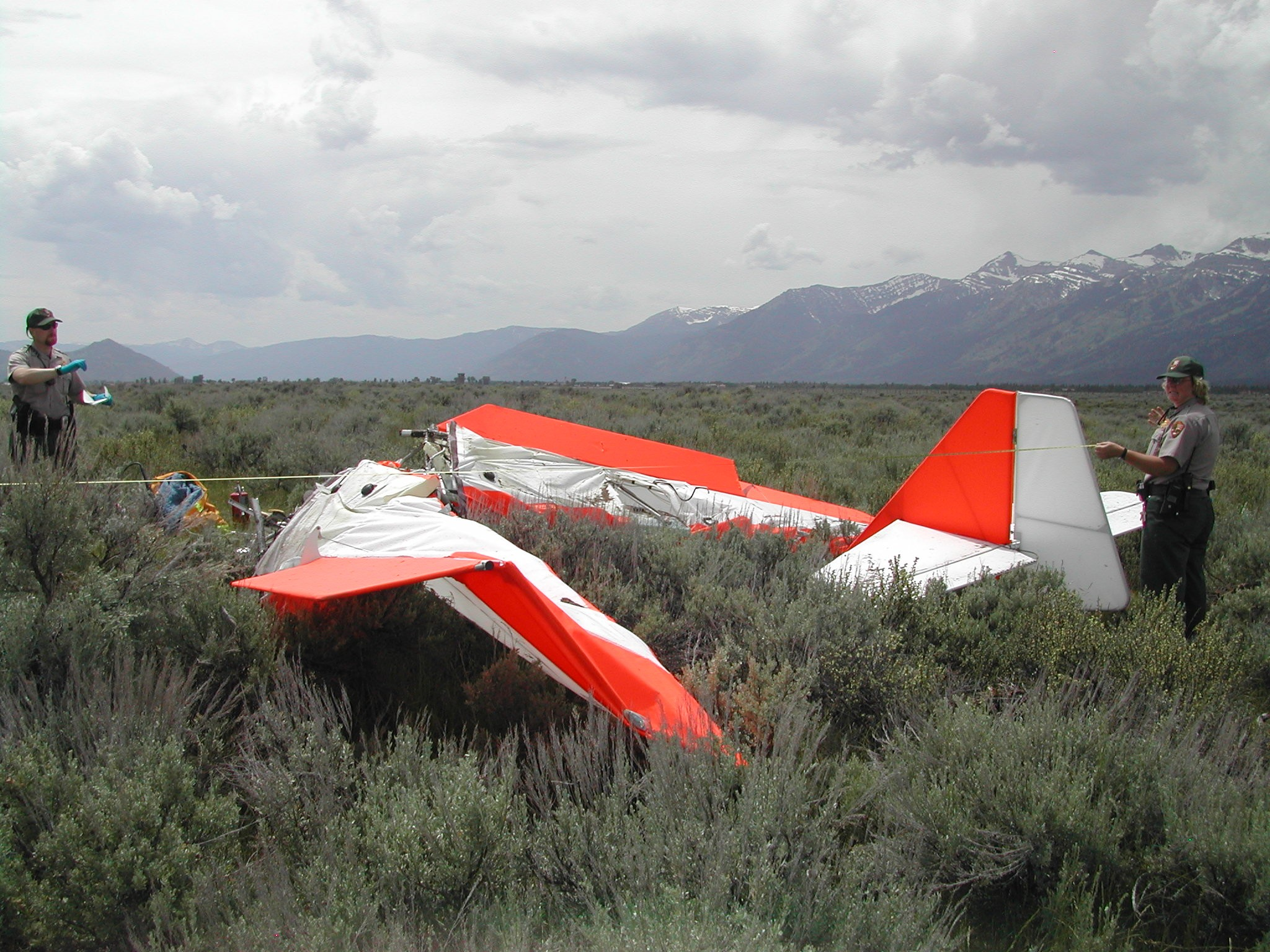
Wreckage of Walton's experimental aircraft at Grand Teton National Park. Photo taken by the National Park Service on June 27, 2005.

Walton died on June 27, 2005, when the CGS Hawk Arrow home-built ultralight aircraft (registered as an "experimental aircraft" under FAA regulations) that he was piloting crashed in Jackson, Wyoming. Walton's plane crashed at 12:20 p.m. local time (18:20 UTC) shortly after taking off from Jackson Hole Airport.

The National Transportation Safety Board later reported that Walton had improperly reinstalled the rear locking collar on the elevator control torque tube. This allowed the torque tube to move rearward during his flight and loosened the elevator control cable tension. The outcome of the failed repair was an inflight loss of pitch control, without which Walton could not control the aircraft's altitude.

Shortly before his death, Forbes magazine had estimated Walton's net worth to be US$18.2 billion, tied with his brother Jim as the 4th richest person in the United States and 11th-richest person in the world.

Walton was survived by his wife Christy and their son Lukas. He was previously married to Mary Ann Gunn, who later became a judge in Arkansas. He had two brothers, S. Robson Walton and Jim Walton and a sister, Alice Walton.

== See also ==
- The World's Billionaires 2004
- Walton family
