= Lukas Walton =

American billionaire, grandson of Walmart founder Sam Walton

- Born: Lukas Tyler Walton; September 19, 1986 (age 39); San Diego, California, U.S.
- Education: Colorado College (BS)
- Spouse: Samantha Walton
- Parent(s): John T. Walton; Christy Walton
- Relatives: Sam Walton (grandfather); Helen Walton (grandmother); Walton family

Lukas Tyler Walton (born September 19, 1986) is an American billionaire heir. He is the grandson of Sam Walton, the founder of Walmart. As of September 2025, Forbes estimated his net worth at US$41.5 billion.

== Early life and career ==
Lukas Walton is the only child of John T. Walton (1946–2005) and his wife Christy Walton. He grew up in National City, California, and Jackson Hole, Wyoming. His father, John T. Walton, died in a plane crash in 2005. Following his father's death, he moved with his mother to Jackson, Wyoming.

When he was three years old, Walton was diagnosed with a rare kidney cancer, from which he eventually recovered.

He has a bachelor's degree in environmentally sustainable business from Colorado College, where he graduated in 2010.

He went on to work at True North Venture Partners.

In 2026, Walton and his wife purchased a minority stake in National Basketball Association (NBA) team the Chicago Bulls, and the team's home venue United Center.

== Politics ==
In 2020, Walton gave $5,600 to the Biden campaign and $142,000 to the Democratic National Committee.

== Personal life ==
Walton lives in Jackson, Wyoming and Chicago. He is married to Samantha Walton, who is listed as the co-president with Lukas Walton in the Builders Initiative, which is a Walton family foundation.

In 2022, Walton was ranked 106th in the Forbes annual list of the world's billionaires with a net worth of $16.5 billion. In 2024, Forbes estimated his net worth at $28 billion, ranking him as the 60th-richest person in the world as well as the richest person in the state of Illinois, which he had previously been in 2020 and 2023.
