= Children's Scholarship Fund =

The Children's Scholarship Fund is a privately funded tuition assistance program in the United States. The fund provides scholarships enabling low-income children to attend private schools. More than 25,700 students in Kindergarten to 8th Grade receive the fund's scholarships. It was founded in 1998 by Theodore J. Forstmann and John T. Walton.

== History ==
Forstmann and the late John Walton met as donors to the Washington Scholarship Fund (WSF), founded in 1993 to provide scholarships for low-income families in Washington D.C. When more than 8,000 applications applied to WSF for the 1998-99 school year the two men realized there was substantial demand among poorer families for alternatives to the public school system.

This need in Washington convinced Ted and John that low-income parents everywhere would welcome the opportunity to choose a private or parochial school over their assigned public school, even if it meant they had to pay a portion of the tuition themselves. After the DC scholarships were awarded, they began thinking of a way to take the program nationwide and truly open the doors of educational opportunity. John and Ted first announced the formation of the Children's Scholarship Fund at the New York Public Library on June 9, 1998. Then Ted, John and CSF's new staff traveled across the country to secure partnerships in major cities and states. Once the partner programs were in place, CSF began to get the word out to parents through local community organizations, churches, and the private schools themselves, and scholarship applications began to roll in. The demand for scholarships was much higher than anticipated. By the March 31 deadline, the parents of more than 1.25 million children had applied.

An astonishing 43% of the eligible population in Newark, NJ, applied for scholarships. In New York, 168,000 applications came in – representing 32% of those eligible to apply. Other cities with especially notable numbers of applications included Los Angeles (26% of those eligible), Baltimore (38%), St. Louis (32%), and Philadelphia (35%). Parents all over the country were sending the same message: they wanted alternatives for their children's education, and they were willing to pay something out of their own pockets to get it.

On April 21, 1999, the first Children's Scholarship Fund scholarships were awarded to 40,000 children all across America. Ceremonies were held in New York, Los Angeles, and many other CSF cities. In New York, Ted Forstmann explained his goal for the scholarships, saying, "Every child, regardless of their parents' income, should have access to a quality education – an education that will not only prepare them for successful private lives, but help them to build cohesive communities and a strong democracy."

Present

Originally, CSF was planned as a four-year program, and families were not promised anything beyond that. But it quickly became obvious that to truly ensure the children would gain a solid foundation, funding would have to continue through the 8th grade. So, after the first four years, CSF went back to the partner programs and donors in an attempt to extend the original awards through 8th grade and allow younger siblings to get scholarships, too. Most of the partner programs not only agreed to extend the original scholarships through 8th grade and add siblings – they also awarded brand new scholarships.

Today, many of the CSF partner programs continue to offer new scholarships annually. The CSF national headquarters in New York administers more than 8,000 scholarships in New York City, as well as providing matching funds and program support for the partner programs nationwide.

Since inception, CSF has awarded $654 million in scholarships to 152,000 needy children. In the 2012-13 school year, more than 25,700 children in 30 partner programs across the country are using CSF scholarships to attend private school. Of the students who receive CSF scholarships, 92 percent graduate high school on time, and 90 percent enroll in college.
