= The Messengers (TV series) =

- Genre: Supernatural; Drama; Mystery
- Created by: Eoghan O'Donnell
- Starring: Shantel VanSanten; Diogo Morgado; J. D. Pardo; Joel Courtney; Jon Fletcher; Sofia Black-D'Elia; Anna Diop; Craig Frank
- Composer: Paul Haslinger
- Country of origin: United States
- Original language: English
- No. of seasons: 1
- No. of episodes: 13

Production
- Executive producers: Trey Callaway; Basil Iwanyk
- Producers: Joseph Incaperra; Oanh Ly; Matt Pitts
- Cinematography: Sid Sidell; John Newby
- Editors: Jeff McEvoy; Jon Koslowsky; Evan Ahlgren
- Camera setup: Single-camera
- Running time: 42 minutes
- Production companies: Thunder Road Television; Warner Bros. Television; CBS Television Studios

Original release
- Network: The CW
- Release: April 17 – July 24, 2015

The Messengers is an American supernatural mystery drama television series that aired on The CW during the 2014–15 season. The series was officially picked up on May 8, 2014, and premiered on April 17, 2015. The series was cancelled by the CW after three episodes, on May 7, 2015, but aired all of its episodes, and concluded on July 24, 2015.

== Plot ==
A mysterious object plummets to Earth, sending out a shock wave that causes five strangers to die, only to miraculously come back to life moments later. The members of the group are Vera (Shantel VanSanten), a struggling radio-astronomer living in New Mexico who is searching for her missing son; Erin (Sofia Black-D'Elia), a young mother in Tucson, Arizona, who is desperate to protect her seven-year-old daughter Amy from her abusive policeman ex-husband; Peter (Joel Courtney), a troubled high school student and orphan in Little Rock, Arkansas; Raul (J. D. Pardo), a federal agent in Mexico who is looking to escape his dangerous and violent undercover assignment; and Joshua (Jon Fletcher), a charismatic second-generation televangelist in Houston, Texas.

Most mysterious of all is the figure known only as The Man (Diogo Morgado), who offers Vera the location of her abducted son if she will help him with one morally complicated task. The task puts her on a collision course with Rose (Anna Diop), a nurse in Houston who has been in a coma for seven years, after being shot by an unknown hitman. Drawn together by fate and biblical prophecy, "The Messengers" soon learn that they now have supernatural gifts which might be the only hope for preventing the impending Rapture.

== Cast and characters ==
=== The Messengers ===
The main characters of the series are the Messengers (real term: "Angels of the Apocalypse"), a group of ordinary humans chosen by God to determine if humanity is worth saving. They are hit by an energy wave from the meteorite that brought The Man to earth, which causes them to die for a few minutes. Then they awaken with strange supernatural abilities denominated as "gifts". However, their gifts have side-effects on their bodies unless the seven true Messengers are united.

- Shantel VanSanten as Vera Buckley

An emotionally and financially struggling radio-astronomer who is searching for her missing son, Michael, who was kidnapped seven years earlier. After finding out her ex-boyfriend (and Michael's father), Leo Travers, carries a genetic disease, which was the reason he broke up with her, Vera decides to tell him about their kidnapped son's existence, rekindling their relationship.
Gift: spirit-walking; side-effect: If her spirit doesn't return to her body in a short time, her body dies.

- J. D. Pardo as Raul Garcia

A former drug courier who became a US Federal agent to bring down the Mexican drug cartel he worked for. It is soon revealed that the detective who arrested him was the one who betrayed him to the same drug cartel. After failing to save his brother, Raul is trying to make amends with his niece, Nadia; both are initially unaware that they are biological father and daughter, but as the series progresses they learn the truth.
Gift: mind-reading and telepathy; side-effect: headaches.

- Joel Courtney as Peter Moore

A troubled high school student and orphan with previous suicidal tendencies. After developing his ability, he kills one of his tormentors in self-defense and ends up on the run. When he meets the other Messengers, Peter learns the meaning of having a family and wants to make amends with his last foster parents, David and Melissa Cooper. He also develops an interest in Raul's niece, Nadia.
Gift: super strength; side-effect: emotional instability.

- Jon Fletcher as Joshua Silburn Jr.

A second-generation televangelist preacher and recovered addict who struggles to find his place in the world. After he realized that his wife cheated on him with his own father (Silburn, Snr.) which makes him the possible father of her baby, Joshua leaves in anger and meets the rest of the Messengers on the way. By the end, he is the only one aware of Erin's daughter, Amy and her true self as the Antichrist.
Gift: Having psychic visions of the future; side-effect: seizures.

- Sofia Black-D'Elia as Erin Calder

A young woman trying to make a new life for herself and daughter after fleeing from her abusive and controlling husband, who is a policeman, but what she doesn't know is that her own daughter is in fact the new Antichrist, the Devil's daughter. She develops an interest in Raul.
Gift: physical healing; side-effect: deterioration in her body.

- Jessika Van as Koa Lin

An orphaned grifter from Hong Kong who learned everything from her father, who was murdered when she was young. She joins the team during the time they are facing the Abaddon hacker so she can regain her lost money.
Gift: shape-shifting; side-effect: losing her own memories in turn.

- Winston Duke as Zahir Zakaria

A journalist from Mali who is determined to seek justice after the Plowman brothers' agricultural experiment goes wrong in a West African village.
Gift: electricity manipulation; side-effect: unknown.

==== The Messengers' allies ====
- Craig Frank as Alan Harris

Vera's assistant astronomer who was oblivious to Vera's powers and of the other Messengers as well, but is convinced that a government conspiracy is behind the recent events. However, after learning the truth from Vera, Alan became a trusted ally for the team. He has a crush on Vera.

- Jennifer Griffin as Eliza Shepard

A former Messenger from a previous generation. She has been watching over the new team's activities, and she has her suspicions about Rose's activity and intentions (by deducing she is a Horseman). She is later killed by the Fairburns under the Devil's orders because she refused to tell him how the antichrist can be destroyed.
Former gift: visions (currently Joshua's gift).

- Brittany O'Grady as Nadia Garcia

Raul's daughter, who she blames for her legal father's (Raul's brother, Cesar) death, especially after she found out that Raul was having an affair with her mother, Gabriela.

- Justin Bruening as Leo Travers

A research scientist who dated Vera while they were attending the same university and is Michael's father. However, after being diagnosed with Huntington's disease, he broke off his relationship with Vera by claiming he'd met someone else and was unaware of his son's existence. Seven years later, he is reunited with Vera and confesses the truth about the break-up, as well as learning about their kidnapped son, leading them to rekindle their relationship.

- Zeb Sanders as Michael Buckley-Travers / Brian Fairburn

Originally known as the archangel who led God's armies against Satan in ancient times, he was sent to Earth by God and ended up being reincarnated as Vera and Leo's son, who was kidnapped by The Man years ago and then given to the Fairburn family.

=== Army of Hell ===
- Diogo Morgado as "The Man"

The Devil incarnate, who attempts to stop the Messengers. He cannot physically harm or kill any Messenger (or any other human being) by himself, which leads to him using and manipulating other people to try to carry out his wishes. He considers himself an admirer of the Horsemen's work, but competes with Rose Arvale (Horseman of Death) for the seals and the power of the meteorite in which the Devil was sent to Earth. The Man is also responsible for taking Vera's son, Michael, to Saint Monica.

- Madison Dellamea as Amy Calder

Erin's daughter who grew up in a broken home with her parents constantly fighting before separating. She draws paintings about future events, pretending to be unconscious about what she does. What no one knows, as it is shown in the penultimate episode, is since her birth, Amy has been chosen to become the next Antichrist whose future is to cause the "lake of fire" on Earth.

- Lane Garrison as Ronnie

A paranoid, abusive and stalking policeman who is Erin's ex-husband and Amy's human father. Despite recognizing his time hurting his family, he still desperately tries to be reunited with them, even if he has to use drastic methods.

- Victor Slezak as Joshua Silburn Sr.

A first-generation televangelist and the father of Joshua Jr. He secretly has violent and aggressive behavior towards his son's wife, with whom he had an affair.

- Miguel Martinez as "El Jefe"

A drug lord linked to Raul Garcia's past, who also has business with The Man.

- Jason Dohring and Elizabeth Bogush as Jeff and Kay Fairburn

A couple who lost a child and made a deal with The Man to adopt Michael, who was kidnapped from his biological mother, Vera.

==== Four Horsemen ====
Every generation there are four people who commit a grievous sin and are assigned to become the Horsemen of the Apocalypse. Rose Arvale, the Horseman of Death, is the leader of the current generation, and they want to use The Man's meteorite as their ultimate weapon for the end of humanity. In contrast to the angel Messengers, the Horsemen immediately become aware of their powers upon a seal being broken as well as their destiny, and about each other's identity. It is also implied that all four of them are telepathic (only to each other) and can read each other's minds.

- Anna Diop as Rose Arvale

A former nurse whose experience during war turned her into a cold-blooded murderer with psychotic tendencies. Back from war, she began killing ill patients as an act of mercy while having an affair with a married doctor until he ended the affair to return to his wife. Feeling jealous, Rose killed the doctor's wife and kept her ring as a souvenir, completing her transformation into the Horseman of Death. Rose then decided to pose as and become the de facto leader of the Messengers as a ruse to find the other Horsemen of the Apocalypse with their help. She shelters the Messengers at a foreclosed house and uses a local eatery/bar entitled "The Last Supper Bar-Grill" as their base of operations. After she shows her true colors by killing Joshua, he is later resurrected by the Devil himself.
Abilities: use of dark magic; speaking and understanding any language (e.g. the language of the dead)

- Lauren Bowles as Cindy Richards

Chosen as the Horseman of War, she is a Senator with an immense resentment against Afghanistan after her son was killed while serving in the Armed Forces.

- Sam Littlefield as Leland Schiller

Chosen as the Horseman of Pestilence, he is the leader of a hacking group called "Abaddon", who wants revenge against an insurance company for denying medical treatment for his ill mother. His plan (which involved killing many innocent people) was stopped once by the Messengers, but he was later released from prison by Rose so he could choose to complete his plan, thus breaking his seal.

- Riley Smith as Mark Plowman

Chosen as the Horseman of Famine, he is initially one of the chairmen of an agricultural company. He cares about the field and his workers, unlike his charismatic and unscrupulous brother Vincent, towards whom he harbors deep resentment. It turns out that both brothers were set up as potential Horsemen of Famine, but Mark is chosen in the end when he kills his brother out of that resentment and thus (like the other three Horsemen) instantly loses his humanity and joins the Horsemen's cause.

=== Others ===
- Robb Moon as the patron of the "Last Supper Bar and Grill".
- Lexi Atkins as Alice, a student who attends Peter's school.
- Katy Rowe as Charlotte Silburn, Joshua Jr.'s wife who is pregnant with his child despite having a short affair with her father-in-law, Joshua Snr.
- Bernardo Saracino as Cesar Garcia, Raul's brother, Gabriela's husband and Nadia's legal father.
- Loren Escandon as Gabriela Garcia, Cesar's widowed wife who has an extramarital affair with his brother Raul, conceiving their daughter Nadia.
- Navid Negahban as the Prime Minister of Afghanistan, Senator Richards' target during her attempted assassination.
- Hannah Marshall as Hope Silburn, Joshua Jr.'s sister whose father discarded her after she came out as a lesbian.
- Roberta Isgreen as Margaret Schiller, Leland's late mother.
- J.B. Tuttle and Fawnda McMahan as Dave and Melissa Cooper, Peter's last foster family who later returned him to Social Services because of his suicidal tendencies, but they are still in contact with him.
- Jamie Bamber as Vincent Plowman, the co-chairman of Plowman Family Farms and the younger brother of Mark Plowman. He is described as unapologetic and aggressive; he is the favorite son which may uproot his ambitious plans.
- Jodi Lynn Thomas as Anne Moore, Peter's biological mother who lived in psychiatric hospital until she killed herself for not having her son with her.
- Jack O'Donnell as Dr. Simon, the lead scientist in charge of the Black Site Laboratory. He is one of the people in charge of investigating the Devil's meteorite, but he and his workers feel threatened by the Four Horsemen.
- Toby Azeem as one of the Patient in Houston hospital in the awakening episode

== Episodes ==
No.	Title	Directed by	Written by	Original release date	U.S. viewers (millions)
1	"Awakening"	Stephen Williams	Eoghan O'Donnell	April 17, 2015	1.19
In Houston, a local hospital nurse named Rose is shot by an unknown thug. Seven years later, a mysterious object falls from deep space and lands in the desert of New Mexico, sending out a shock-wave, killing five different people: Vera, a radio-astronomer searching for her missing son; Erin, a mother who is desperate to protect her daughter from her abusive ex-husband; Peter, a troubled student and orphan; Raul, a federal agent looking to escape his dangerous undercover assignment; and Joshua, a charismatic televangelist. The five wake up, bestowed with mystical powers. Raul develops the power of mind-reading. Erin unknowingly heals her daughter after a car crash. Peter learns that he has powers of super strength when he is attacked by a bully. Joshua develops powers of "second sight", where he tells everyone that the Rapture is coming. A man, who had been in the object that crashed to Earth, appears before Vera to tell her that he knows where her missing son is.
2	"Strange Magic"	Duane Clark	Trey Callaway & Eoghan O'Donnell	April 24, 2015	0.77
The group is drawn to the hospital where Rose is laying in a coma for the past seven years. The Man tries to force Vera to kill her in her bed, when Rose awakens and the Man flees. Rose then explains to the five that they all have been resurrected as angels, and that they have been chosen to be the Messengers of God in order to prevent the impending Rapture. Their mission is to find and kill the Four Horsemen of the Apocalypse before the Man finds them first. Joshua tries to convince Vera otherwise and tries to help her find a one-armed Iraq War veteran before the Man approaches him first. Each one of the Messengers are now fugitives, and they also learn that they cannot rely on anyone else. Meanwhile, Raul tries to find his brother who has been abducted by the drug cartel, and he teams up with his niece, Nadia. Peter learns that he is now a fugitive and attempts to go into hiding. Erin continues avoiding the police, while Vera is plagued with dreams about her missing son.
3	"Path to Paradise"	Cherie Nowlan	Story by : Oanh Ly; Teleplay by : Matt Pitts	May 1, 2015	0.65
The Messengers attempt to find the Horseman of War before the Man finds him first. With the help of Joshua's visions and Peter's computer skills, Rose and Erin follow the leads to two suspects; a visiting Arab dignitary and a Senator who is the mother of an Iraqi War soldier killed in action. Meanwhile, Raul continues his personal quest to locate his missing brother, unaware that the Man has set a trap for him. Vera continues to investigate the mysterious meteor rock particle which leads her and her co-worker Alan to a former lover who went into hiding for her own good nine years ago, and who was her son's biological father. The government is revealed to be holding the remains of the meteor that brought the Man to Earth as a top secret research project called Project Genesis. Peter is ambushed by the police and is arrested for murder.
4	"Drums of War"	Guy Bee	Carl Binder	May 8, 2015	0.68
With Peter in jail, the Man tries everything in his power to keep him there by playing on his insecurity as well harming his self-defense claim. Peter's background story is revealed of him being a life-long orphan and his first attempt at suicide years earlier after learning that his kind but destitute foster parents cannot afford to keep him. As Rose tries to help Peter, she leads the rest of the Messengers to an international energy summit in Houston to look for the Horseman of War where they learn that a corrupt US senator, named Cindy, is plotting to assassinate the prime minister of Afghanistan. As Vera gradually embraces her new power of spirit-walking, she continues to throw off Alan who becomes suspicious to what is now going on with her life. Elsewhere, Joshua pays a visit to his estranged sister, who was disowned by the family years earlier after she came out about her sexual orientation.
5	"Eye in the Sky"	Eriq La Salle	Matt Pitts	May 15, 2015	0.71
Erin decides to celebrate her daughter Amy's seventh birthday, but another complication sets in when Erin's estranged and revenge-seeking husband tracks her down with the intent to take Amy away. Erin's background story is shown of her troubled marriage. While attempting to help Erin, Peter confides in Nadia about his powers and of the group's mission. Peter also has a run-in with a homeless woman who advises him to "follow the signs". Having not had a vision in over a week, Joshua attempts to re-start his visions with Raul's help who takes him to the desert to meet with a Native American shaman in hope to unlock Joshua's memories. Rose and the rest of the group tries to learn the identity of the next Horseman before the second seal is broken and the clues lead to an unknown computer hacker targeting wealthy corporations around the world. Vera learns that using her spirit-walking powers are draining her life force. Elsewhere, another Messenger angel is revealed: Koa Lin is a Hong Kong resident who sets off to find the Messengers after she too becomes the victim of the cyber hacking group. Her gift is that of shape-shifting.
6	"Metamorphosis"	Jeff Hunt	Dre Alvarez and Anna Fishko	May 22, 2015	0.80
The Messengers try to figure out the identity of the Horseman of Pestilence by trying to figure out the identity of computer hacker known as Abaddon within the next 36 hours before the next computer hacking strike will happen and the Second Seal will be broken. Koa Lin arrives in Houston and finally runs into the Messengers while searching for Abaddon, seeking retribution for the loss of all her money. Koa Lin's background story is shown of her growing up as a child pickpocket and career criminal in Hong Kong and to the day she got her powers and used them for own advantages of gambling and stealing. While Raul, Joshua and Peter rightfully do not trust Koa, aware that her motivations stem from self-interest, Rose and Erin try to give Lin the benefit of a doubt to help them find a connection between the banks and businesses that have been hacked which leads all of them to a local, low-income health clinic. Erin comes to learn has her powers of healing have growing side affects on herself. Meanwhile, Vera and Alan venture off to investigate the origins of the so-called Genesis rock, which leads them to a national park where they are chased by armed gunmen working for the government.
7	"Deus Ex Machina"	Jim Conway	Clark Perry	May 29, 2015	0.72
Koa sets off on her own to find the Abaddon hacker, Leland Schiller, only to end up a captive by him. After Vera confides in Alan about who she and the Messengers are, he willingly decides to join their cause despite protests from Rose and everyone else. They soon discover a cyber scheme by Leland to murder thousands of people in hospital care and try to shut down the system before Leland can upload a virus. Erin's attempt to heal Koa nearly costs Erin her life due to her healing powers. Meanwhile, Joshua tries to escape from his past when his estranged pregnant wife shows up after running away from his father. Joshua's background story is revealed at how he met his wife while he was in rehab and of her tryst with his unethical father who decides to take matters into his own hands. As always, the Devil is behind Joshua Senior's actions in order to continue to drive the Messengers apart.
8	"A House Divided"	Paul Kaufman	Harrison Weinfeld & Daniel Zucker	June 5, 2015	0.86
After a latest setback, the Messengers begin to think about their value of being angels. Erin wants to go away with Raul to start her life over with him, but Nadia runs away which makes Raul delay his travel plans to team up with Nadia's estranged mother to find her. More of Nadia and Raul's background story is shown when Nadia discovered years earlier that her mother was cheating on her father with, of all people, Raul. Meanwhile, Joshua's pill-popping addiction resumes when he is pressured to take over leadership of his father's church. Also, Peter and Koa venture to an abandoned mental hospital to look up the origins of Peter's birth mother and learn from the groundskeeper the real story where Peter came from. Vera finally tells her old beau about the existence of their son, who is revealed to be living with another couple, whom are connected to Joshua. Elsewhere, Leland finally becomes the dark angel Horseman and joins Senator Cindy Richards, but they both express displeasure with the Devil over his impending plans for both of them, and the world.
9	"Death Becomes Her"	Larry Shaw	Oanh Ly	June 12, 2015	0.83
Vera, Raul, Joshua and Koa are held hostage at the Last Supper Grill by the Devil who tries to persuade them to listen to him in explaining about a secret that Rose has been keeping from all of them which knowing the truth might put all of them in danger. More of Rose's background story is revealed of being a combat medic in Iraq which lead to her own dark path after she accepted the practice of euthanasia. Meanwhile, Peter, Erin, and Nadia receive a visit from Eliza, the homeless woman who interacted with all of them on several occasions, where she reveals that she was a former Messenger who used to have Joshua's abilities, but that Rose may not appear who she claims to be since her gift is not one that any previous Messenger has had. Also, Erin discovers that Amy has the ability of clairvoyance when she sees Amy's drawings of what might be to come and of the location of the fourth and final Horseman.
10	"Why We Fight"	Tim Hunter	Joe Peracchio	June 19, 2015	0.76
Reeling from the recent events, the Devil brings Joshua back to life on some conditions that the group keep him informed to their plans. Afterwards, the Messengers board a train to travel to California to find and stop a pair of brothers, one of whom may be the Horseman of Famine, from committing a fateful sin and breaking the Fourth Seal, but the group gets sidetracked by things beyond their control. Vera and Alan disembark from the train in New Mexico after Vera sees a sign to where her missing son might be located. Raul, Peter and Erin are forced to disembark to evade the authorities in which they end up hiding out at a rural Arizona farm from one of Joshua's visions where they become embroiled in a family conflict between the family owning the farm and a hired hand. Also, Koa confides in Joshua that frequent use of her shapeshifting powers are taking a toll on her short and long term memories. Elsewhere, Senator Richards and Leland Schiller oversee the final recovery of the Genesis meteor rock and decide to use the rock fragments as their new weapon of war and genocide.
11	"Harvest"	Oz Scott	Carl Binder	July 10, 2015	0.82
The Messengers assemble in California to locate the fourth Horseman. Raul, Joshua, and Erin go undercover to find which one of the Plowman brothers, Mark or Vincent, is the Horseman of Famine before a project by the Plowmans begins which will break the fourth seal. Meanwhile, Peter and Koa set out to find and rescue Vera who searches for the abducted Alan and learns more about Senator Richards plans when she stumbles upon the secret location of the Genesis meteor rock and of its powers when the fragments glow blue with healing power when in close contact to the Angel Messengers and it glows red with destructive power when in close contact to the Evil Horsemen. Also, the Devil continues to try to win the approval and trust of Joshua and the other Messengers to stop the Rapture, even though they still do not trust him.
12	"Spark of Hope"	Fred Toye	Eoghan O'Donnell	July 17, 2015	0.62
The Messengers team up to try to locate and free a seventh messenger from a black site prison, an African national named Zahir Zakaria who has the power to harness electricity. But their plans start to unravel when Koa begins losing her memories from the excessive use of her powers and she and Raul are captured. Using her spirit-walking powers, Vera tries to convince Zahir about his own destiny to help prevent the Rapture. Meanwhile, the Devil meets with former Messenger Eliza about her knowledge about the upcoming Rapture and what the Messengers know. The Devil then has Jeff and Amy Fairburn murder Eliza to make sure she will never talk to the Messengers again.
13	"Houston, We Have a Problem"	Duane Clark	Trey Callaway	July 24, 2015	0.82
The seven united Messengers, Vera, Raul, Peter, Joshua, Erin, Koa and Zahir, face off against the Four Horsemen of the Apocalypse, Rose, Cindy, Leland, and Mark, in a final confrontation. Following another vision from Joshua, they realize that the Horsemen plot to release a lethal "red acid rain" upon Houston, Texas, to break the fifth seal using government drones to carry out the plot. Meanwhile, the Devil tries to persuade Erin's ex-husband to set fire and burn down the motel where the Fairburns are holding Vera's son, Michael, in attempt to kill all of them to tie up any loose ends. Alan teams up with Leo to try to find Michael following Joshua's vision, while Nadia is asked to take Erin's daughter, Amy, away from the city before the event will take place. Despite the Messengers combined powers, they all end up captive by the evil Horsemen and their mercenaries when they realize that joining their powers and perform as selfless act will make a difference. Just as the red acid rain begins to fall upon the city and people begin dying, the Messengers allow themselves to be shot by the mercenaries allowing the powers of God to transform the red rain into healing blue rain, which turns the balance in their favor. The Four Horsemen are defeated and the city is saved and the fifth seal remains intact and the Messengers are resurrected. Vera is finally reunited with her son Michael after he is found in the rubble of the burned-down motel with not an injury upon him. Two weeks later, as the Messengers are back at the Last Supper Bar, Joshua confides in Vera that he had another vision that her son, Michael, is the archangel of Heaven to bring peace, but that Erin's daughter, Amy, is in fact the antichrist (the woman with the upside-down face in his vision) who will bring death to the world. It is confirmed to the viewers when the Devil eyes the Messengers from a distance and addresses Amy as his daughter.

== Reception ==
=== Critical reception ===
The Messengers has received mixed reviews from critics. Rotten Tomatoes gives the show a rating of 47% based on 17 reviews with an average rating of 5.6 out of 10. The site's consensus reads: "The Messengers flashes bursts of potential, but ultimately sags beneath derivative, muddled storytelling". Metacritic gave the show a score of 56 out of 100, based on 15 reviews, indicating "mixed or average reviews".

== Release ==
The Messengers was scheduled to premiere on April 10, 2015, but was moved back a week to April 17, 2015. In Australia, the series premiered on FOX8 on June 3, 2015.
