= Michael J. Ahearn =

American businessman

- Born: 1956 or 1957 (age 68–69)
- Education: Arizona State University College of Law (J.D.)
- Known for: co-founder and chairman of First Solar founder and managing partner of True North Venture Partners
- Board member of: First Solar; Cox Enterprises; Endeavor

Michael J. Ahearn (born 1956/1957) is an American businessman, co-founder and chairman of First Solar, and founder and managing partner of True North Venture Partners.

He received BS in Finance and JD degree from Arizona State University.

In 1996, Ahearn started True North Partners, LLC (which later changed to JWMA), an equity investment firm, with John T. Walton. Ahearn was a partner and president of the firm.

Ahearn co-founded First Solar in 1999, and was CEO from 2000 to 2009.

In 2011, Ahearn launched True North Venture Partners, which funds solar startups.

Ahearn is a director of Cox Enterprises, Endeavor, and several True North portfolio companies.

Ahearn lives in Phoenix, Arizona.
