= The Horsemen's Voice =

American magazine

The Horsemen's Voice (THV) is an independent, privately owned magazine founded in 1982 by Sallie Pennybacker as the newsletter for the New Mexico Horse Council, in New Mexico, USA. She published the magazine for 17 years.

THV grew beyond the New Mexico Horse Council and became a magazine. For a time during 2000–2004, there was an additional, online newsletter, but this caused confusion, with many newsletter subscribers thinking the newsletter and magazine were the same. The magazine's tagline has undergone variations, such as "New Mexico's All Breed, All Discipline horse magazine" and "New Mexico's Horse Magazine." In 2006, the introduction of color printing extended to the cover and select pages. A notable aspect of the magazine is its complimentary calendar of events, frequently featuring 6–8 listings for events occurring on a given weekend.

== History ==
Owners:

- Sallie Pennybacker, founding–1999
- Nancy Gage and Jay Koch, 2000–2004
- Catherine Logan-Carrillo, 2004–current
