= List of centibillionaires =

Cataloging of people with a net worth of $100 billion or more

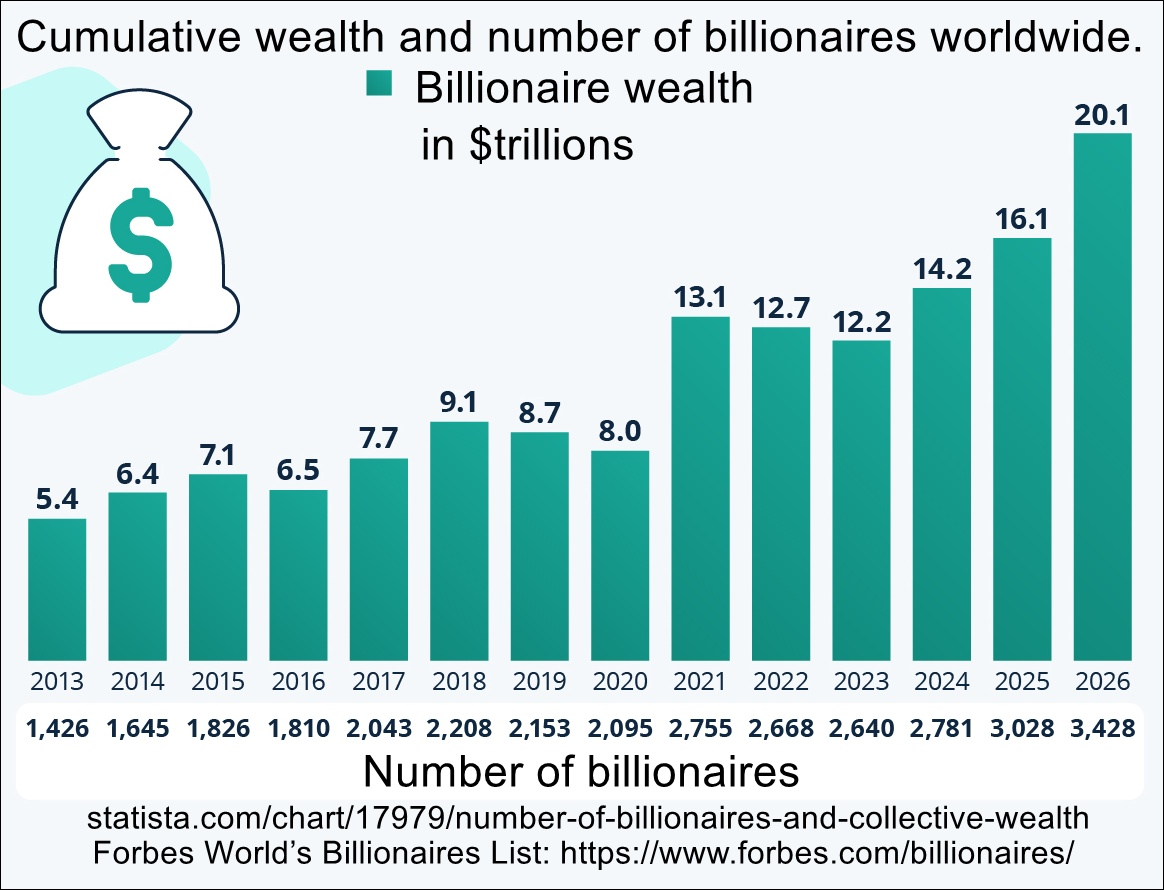
World's billionaires. Number and total wealth by year. Trillions of dollars.

A centibillionaire (prefix: centi- from Latin centum 'hundred' and billionaire) is an individual whose net worth is at least 100 billion units of a given currency, typically USD. As of October 2026, there are 18 centibillionaires in the world.

== List ==
List of centibillionaires Data from Forbes. Figures rounded to the nearest ten billion as of November 7, 2026.
Net worth	Name	Source	Centibillionaire status reached	Rank at highest wealth
$850B	(United States) Elon Musk (world's first trillionaire, Jun/Oct 2026)	Tesla, SpaceX	Aug. 2020	1
$370B	(United States) Jeff Bezos	Amazon	Nov. 2017	3
$230B	(United States) Larry Page	Alphabet	Apr. 2021	4
$210B	(United States) Sergey Brin	Alphabet	Apr. 2021	5
$200B	(United States) Mark Zuckerberg	Meta	Aug. 2020	7
$190B	(United States) Michael Dell	Dell Technologies	Mar. 2024	6
$170B	(United States) Larry Ellison and family	Oracle	Jul. 2021	2
$160B	(United States) Steve Ballmer	Microsoft	Jul. 2021	10
$160B	(United States) Jensen Huang	Nvidia	Feb. 2024	9
$160B	(United States) Warren Buffett	Berkshire Hathaway	Mar. 2021	12
$150B	(Spain) Amancio Ortega and family	Inditex	Aug. 2024	17
$140B	(United States) Rob Walton and family	Walmart	Sep. 2024	14
$140B	(United States) Jim Walton and family	Walmart	Sep. 2024	13
$130B	(United States) Alice Walton	Walmart	Sep. 2025	15
$120B	(Mexico) Carlos Slim and family	América Móvil, Grupo Carso	May 2024	18
$120B	(France) Bernard Arnault and family	LVMH	Jun. 2019	8
$120B	(United States) Bill Gates	Microsoft	Apr. 1999	11
$110B	(Canada) Changpeng Zhao	Binance	Mar. 2026	20
$100B	(France) Francoise Bettencourt Meyers	L'Oreal	Dec. 2023	21

== See also ==
- The World's Billionaires
- Forbes 400
- Bloomberg Billionaires Index
- Business oligarch
- List of cities by number of billionaires
- List of countries by number of billionaires
- List of universities by number of billionaire alumni
- List of wealthiest families
- Trillionaire
