= List of countries by number of millionaires =

This is a list of countries by the number of millionaires by net worth (in United States dollars) based on an annual assessment of wealth and assets compiled and published by the Swiss bank Credit Suisse. According to estimates, in the middle of 2021, there were 56 million people worldwide whose assets exceeded one million US dollars, of whom nearly 40% lived in the United States.

== By region ==
Numbers of US dollar millionaires by world region per Credit Suisse (2022)
| Rank | Region | Numbers (in thousands) | Percentage of world total numbers | As percentage of total adult population |
|---|---|---|---|---|
| - | World | 62,489 | 100.0 | 1.1 |
| 1 | Northern America | 26,778 | 41.9 | 9.5 |
| 2 | Europe | 16,696 | 26.7 | 2.8 |
| 3 | Asia-Pacific | 10,755 | 17.2 | 0.8 |
| 4 | China | 6,190 | 9.9 | 0.6 |
| 5 | Latin America | 915 | 1.5 | 0.2 |
| 6 | India | 796 | 1.3 | 0.1 |
| 7 | Africa | 352 | 0.6 | 0.1 |

== By country ==
* Indicates links to articles on the economy of the country or territorial goods.

Numbers of US dollar millionaires by country per UBS (2026)
| Country or subnational area | Number of millionaires | % of population |
|---|---|---|
| United States | 23,627,000 | 6.85 |
| China | 5,305,000 | 0.38 |
| Japan | 2,902,000 | 2.37 |
| Germany | 2,648,000 | 3.21 |
| United Kingdom | 2,428,000 | 3.51 |
| France | 2,388,000 | 3.52 |
| Canada | 2,098,000 | 5.07 |
| Australia | 1,634,000 | 6.05 |
| South Korea | 1,317,000 | 2.59 |
| Netherlands | 1,294,000 | 7.18 |
| Italy | 1,235,000 | 2.12 |
| Spain | 1,077,000 | 2.29 |
| Switzerland | 944,000 | 10.12 |
| India | 944,000 | 0.06 |
| Taiwan | 772,000 | 3.52 |
| Hong Kong SAR | 628,000 | 7.72 |
| Belgium | 556,000 | 5.02 |
| Sweden | 507,000 | 5.03 |
| Russia | 447,000 | 0.31 |
| Brazil | 386,000 | 0.18 |
| Saudi Arabia | 348,000 | 0.94 |
| Mexico | 333,000 | 0.25 |
| Singapore | 244,000 | 4.71 |
| Israel | 195,000 | 2.08 |
| Ireland | 192,000 | 3.6 |
| United Arab Emirates | 183,000 | 1.63 |
| Portugal | 181,000 | 1.82 |
| Poland | 101,000 | 0.27 |
| South Africa | 97,000 | 0.16 |
| Turkey | 93,000 | 0.11 |
| Luxembourg | 85,000 | 12.73 |
| Greece | 82,000 | 0.79 |
| Qatar | 30,000 | 1.04 |
| Hungary | 27,000 | 0.29 |
| Cyprus | 24,000 | 2.37 |

== See also ==
- Millionaire
- List of countries by number of billionaires
- List of countries by share of income of the richest one percent
