= Billionaire =

Person who has at least one billion units of a currency

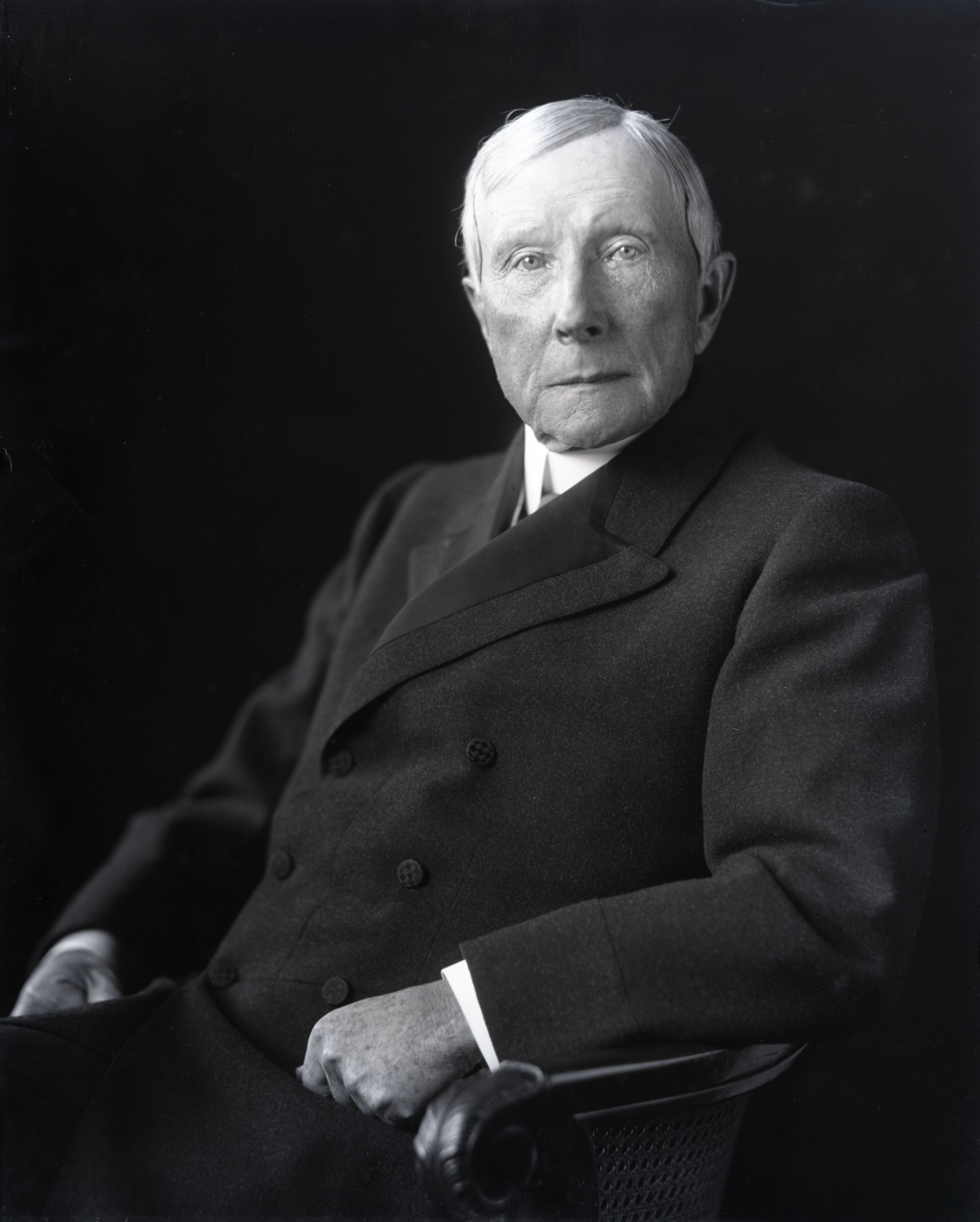
The Standard Oil founder John D. Rockefeller became the first billionaire in US dollars in 1916.

A billionaire is a person whose net worth is at least one billion units of a given currency, typically USD. It is a sub-category of the concept of the ultra high-net-worth individual. The American business magazine Forbes produces a global list of known U.S. dollar billionaires every year and updates an internet version of this list in real time. The American oil magnate John D. Rockefeller became the world's first confirmed billionaire in 1916.

As of October 2026, 18 individuals are centibillionaires (with a net worth of at least $100 billion), one of whom has been a trillionaire (with a net worth of at least $1,000 billion or $1 trillion). As of March 2025, there are 3,028 billionaires worldwide, with a combined wealth of over $16.1 trillion, up nearly $2 trillion over 2024.

== Current U.S. dollar billionaires ==
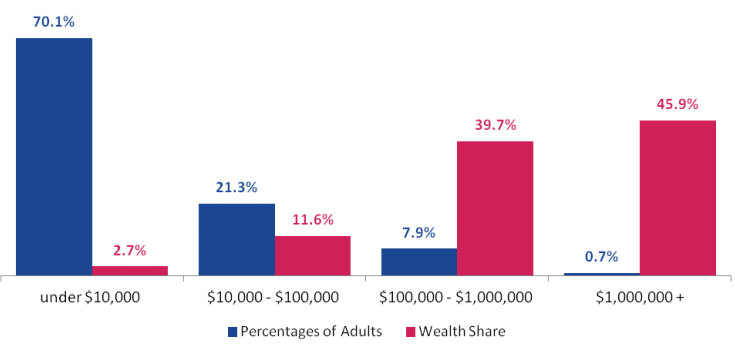
Global share of wealth by wealth group, Credit Suisse, 2017

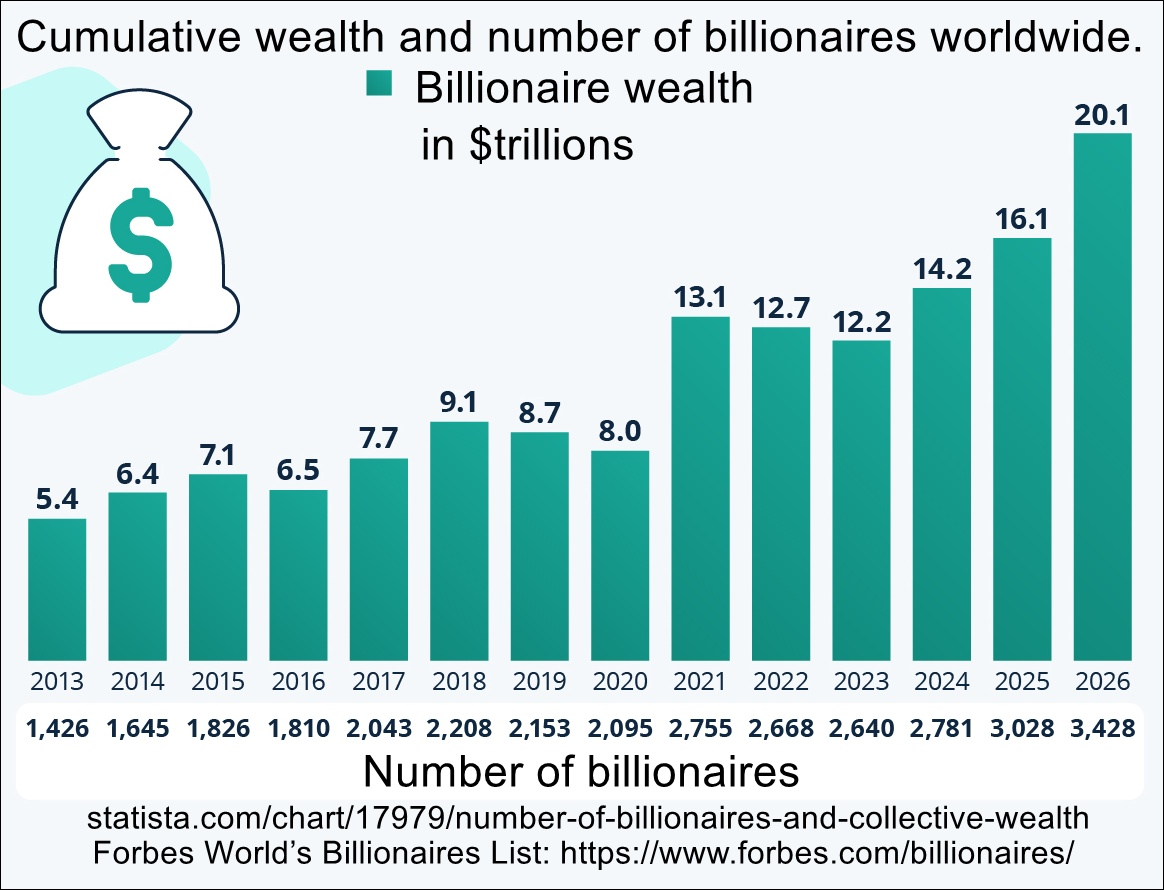
World's billionaires. Number and total wealth by year. Trillions of dollars.

According to the UBS/PwC Billionaires Report 2019 report released in November 2019, there are currently 2,101 U.S. dollar billionaires worldwide, from 66 countries, with a combined net worth of $8.5 trillion. Also according to the report, billionaires have a substantial positive contribution to the sustainability and success of companies controlled by them. Billionaire-controlled companies listed on the equity market returned 17.8 percent, compared with the 9.1 percent of the MSCI AC World Index. According to the authors of the report, this Billionaire Effect is connected with smart risk-taking and willingness to plan and invest for the long term.

The majority of billionaires are male, as fewer than 11% (197 of 1,826) on the 2015 list were female billionaires. The United States has the largest number of billionaires of any country, with 536 as of 2015, while China, India and Russia are home to 213, 90 and 88 billionaires, respectively. As of 2015, only 46 billionaires were under the age of 40, while the list of American-only billionaires, as of 2010, had an average age of 66.

Different authorities use different methodologies to determine net worth and to rank them, and not all information about personal finances is publicly available. In 2019, Forbes counted a record 607 billionaires in the U.S. Over the course of the 2020s, depending on the source and the year, the world's richest person has been reckoned to be Jeff Bezos, Bernard Arnault and family, or Elon Musk.

From 2014 to 2019, the number of female billionaires grew by 46%. That is more than the number of male billionaires in the same period (39%). As of 2019 there were 233 female billionaires in the world, compared to 160 in 2013.

== Education and work experience ==
Billionaires come from a very wide variety of backgrounds. College education is not universal among billionaires, as almost 30% of billionaires around the world in 2015 did not have a college degree of any kind. But this shows substantial correlation between education and success. More than 70% of these billionaires have some kind of college degree, while in the general US population only 38% have a college degree, and in the general world population less than 10% of people have a college degree.

There is also a substantial correlation between top university education and billionaire status. The top 10 universities in the United States produced 99 of the top 400 billionaires in 2018, which makes these schools overrepresented among billionaires compared with the general population. For example, 10 billionaires (or 4%) had graduated from Harvard University, while Harvard graduates only make up 0.2% of the general population of adults in the United States; in other words, a billionaire from the Forbes 400 list that year was 20 times more likely to have gone to Harvard than a non-billionaire.

Billionaires come from a wide range of fields of study and initial employment. The most common field of university education for billionaires was finance and economics, which contributed to a combined 15.5% of billionaire educations, a similar proportion to the general US population. Very few college-educated billionaires pursued business interests in their field of study, with the exception of computer science majors. All twelve of the computer science major billionaires worked in computer science, while only half of engineers worked in engineering, and less than a quarter of finance and economics majors ever worked in finance or economics. The most common field for billionaires to enter for their first job was sales and military service. Military service produced 21 billionaires.

== Inequality ==
Between 2010 and 2015 the wealth of the richest 62 people among the World's Billionaires increased by $500 bn (£350 bn) to $1.76 tn. More recently, in 2017, an Oxfam report noted that just eight billionaires have as much net worth as "half the human race". However, the Oxfam report has been criticized for considering debt as negative wealth, which leads to wealthy people with large amounts of debt being considered poor or not wealthy.

== Public perception ==
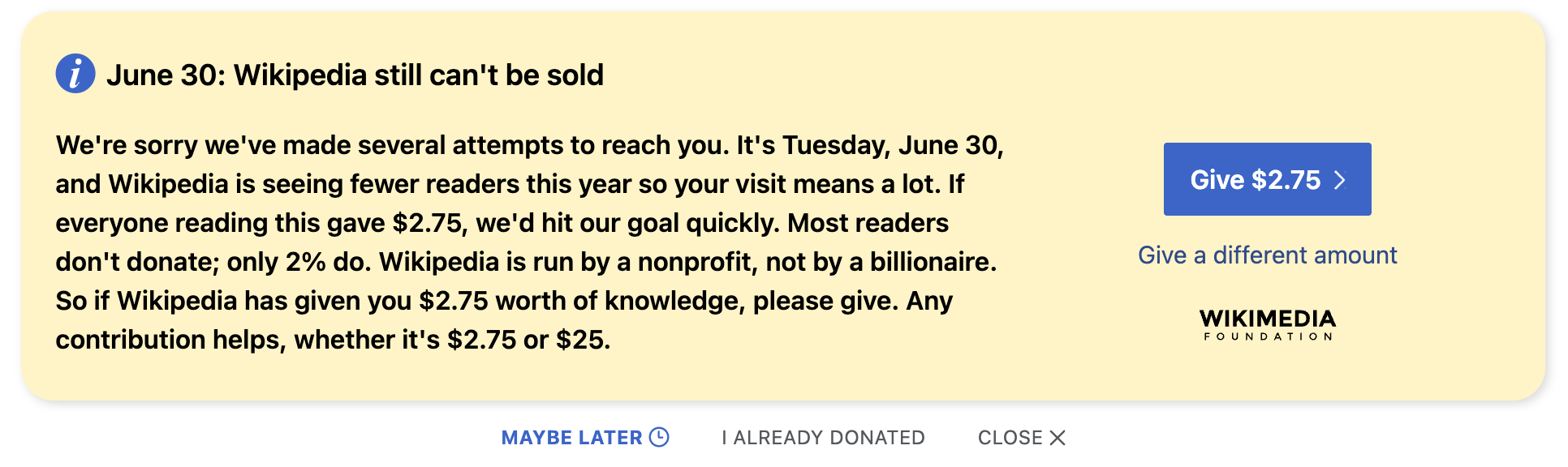
"Wikipedia is run by a nonprofit, not by a billionaire."

Attitudes toward billionaires vary by country. A comparative study of 13 countries found attitudes were most positive in Vietnam, South Korea, and Japan, and most negative in France and Germany. A 2024 study of over 4,300 people in 20 countries found that people in wealthier and more income-equal countries were more likely to view extreme wealth as immoral, and that cultural and religious background shaped attitudes: in countries with strong Protestant traditions, wealth was more often seen as acceptable if earned through hard work.

In the United States, a 2021 Pew Research Center survey of over 10,000 adults found that 29% considered the existence of billionaires bad for the country (up from 23% in 2020), while 15% said it was good and a majority said it was neither; half of adults under 30 held a negative view. In France, an IFOP poll found that 85% wanted fiscal austerity to fall more heavily on large fortunes and corporations. A 2024 Survation poll of millionaires across G20 countries found that over half believed extreme wealth threatens democracy, and seven in ten supported raising taxes on the richest.

Oxfam's 2026 inequality report, released at the World Economic Forum in Davos, cited a World Values Survey of 66 countries in which nearly half of respondents said the rich often buy elections in their country; the report also counted 142 anti-government protests across 68 countries in 2025, many driven in part by economic inequality.

Billionaires have been the subject of street protests. The Occupy Wall Street movement, which began in 2011, popularized the framing of "the 1%" versus "the 99%." In September 2025, thousands marched in New York City and other U.S. cities in "Make Billionaires Pay" protests organized by a coalition including 350.org and the Women's March. A rarer example of mobilization in the opposite direction was a small March for Billionaires in San Francisco in February 2026, organized in support of billionaires and against a proposed California wealth tax, yet there was substantial confusion regarding whether this protest was satire.

== Statistics ==
These aggregated statistics for billionaires include the total number of known billionaires and the net worth of the world's wealthiest individual for each year since 2008. Data for each year is from the annual Forbes list of billionaires, with currency figures given in U.S. dollars. Data since 2018 also includes the Wealth-X billionaire census which typically finds higher numbers than Forbes.

Billionaires worldwide. Number, total wealth, and wealthiest individual by year
Year	Total number of billionaires	Total combined wealth	Number of billionaires					Wealthiest individual	
Year	Total number of billionaires	Total combined wealth	U.S.	Chinese	Indian	German	Russian	Name	Net worth
2024	2,781	$14.2 trillion	813	473	200			Bernard Arnault and family	$233 billion
2022	2,668	$9.562 trillion	735	539	166	134	83	Elon Musk	$219 billion
2021	2,755	$10.016 trillion	724	626	140	136	117	Elon Musk	$320 billion
2020	2,095	$10.2 trillion	614	389	102		99	Jeff Bezos	$188 billion
2019	2,153–2,604	$8.6–8.7 trillion	609–705	285–324	82–106		98–102	Jeff Bezos	$131 billion
2018	2,208–2,754	$9.1–9.2 trillion	585–680	338–372	117–119		96–111	Jeff Bezos	$133 billion
2017	2,043	$7.71 trillion	565	319	101		106	Jeff Bezos	$99.6 billion
2016	1,810	$6.48 trillion	540	251	90		75	Bill Gates	$75 billion
2015	1,826	$7.05 trillion	536	213	88		88	Bill Gates	$79.2 billion
2014	1,645	$6.4 trillion	492	152	56		111	Bill Gates	$78 billion
2013	1,426	$5.4 trillion	442	122	–		110	Carlos Slim	$73 billion
2012	1,226	$4.6 trillion	425	95	–		96	Carlos Slim	$73 billion
2011	1,210	$4.5 trillion	413	115	–		101	Carlos Slim	$74 billion
2010	1,011	$3.6 trillion	404	89	–		62	Carlos Slim	$53.5 billion
2009	793	$2.4 trillion	359	28	–		32	Bill Gates	$40 billion
2008	1,125	$4.4 trillion	470	–	–		87	Warren Buffett	$62 billion

== See also ==
- List of centibillionaires
- Billionaire space race
- Bloomberg Billionaires Index (global)
- Business oligarch
- Foundation
- List of cities by number of billionaires
- List of countries by number of billionaires
- List of universities by number of billionaire alumni
- List of wealthiest families
- Quantitative easing
- The World's Billionaires
