= List of cities by number of billionaires =

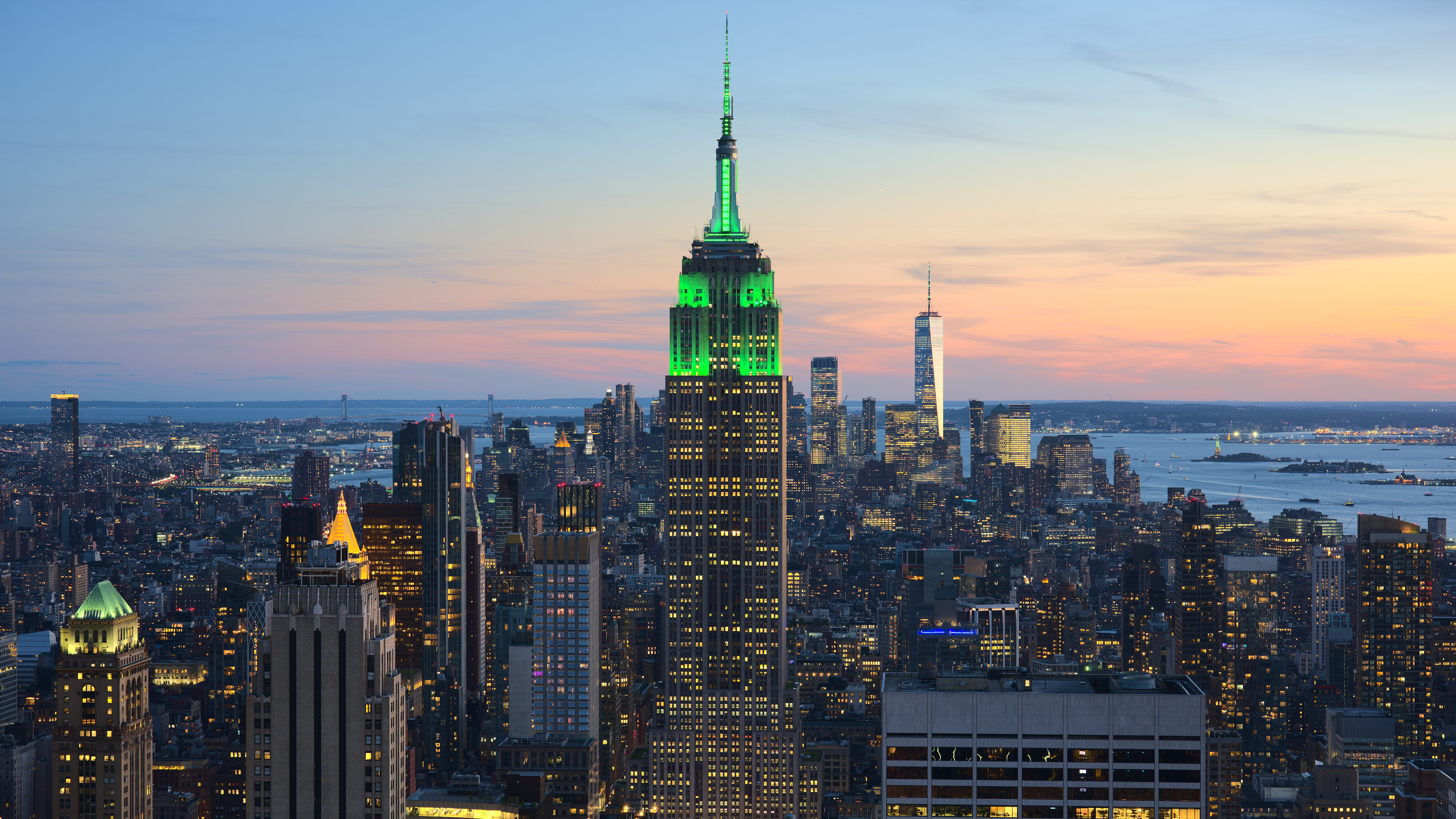
New York City leads with the highest number of billionaires, counted at 123 in 2025 by Forbes.

There are a number of different lists compiled by various publications around the world that attempt to determine the number of billionaires in the world's major cities. The best-known estimate is by Forbes.

== Lists ==
Forbes (2025)
City	Billionaires
(United States) New York City	123
(Russia) Moscow	90
Hong Kong	72
(United Kingdom) London	71
(China) Beijing	68
(India) Mumbai	67
Singapore	60
(United States) San Francisco	58
(China) Shanghai	58
(United States) Los Angeles	56

Hurun Research Institute (2026)
City	Billionaires
(United States) New York City	146
(China) Shenzhen	132
(China) Shanghai	120
(China) Beijing	107
(United Kingdom) London	102
(India) Mumbai	95
Hong Kong	88
(United States) San Francisco	86
(Russia) Moscow	82
(China) Hangzhou	65
(India) New Delhi	64
Singapore	59
(Taiwan) Taipei	51
(France) Paris	44
(Brazil) São Paulo	41
(China) Guangzhou	41
(United States) Los Angeles	40
(Thailand) Bangkok	40
(China) Suzhou	39
(South Korea) Seoul	32
(China) Ningbo	32
(Indonesia) Jakarta	32
(Japan) Tokyo	31
(Turkey) Istanbul	31
(India) Bengaluru	30
(Sweden) Stockholm	29
(Italy) Milan	28
(United States) Dallas	28
(Canada) Toronto	26
(United States) Palm Beach	24
(Australia) Melbourne	24
(United Arab Emirates) Dubai	24

== See also ==
- The World's Billionaires
- Lists of people by net worth
- List of cities by number of millionaires
- List of cities by number of ultra high-net-worth individuals
- List of cities by total wealth
- List of countries by number of billionaires
- List of countries by total wealth
- List of wealthiest families
- List of universities by number of billionaire alumni
