= Trillionaire =

Person who has at least one trillion units of a currency

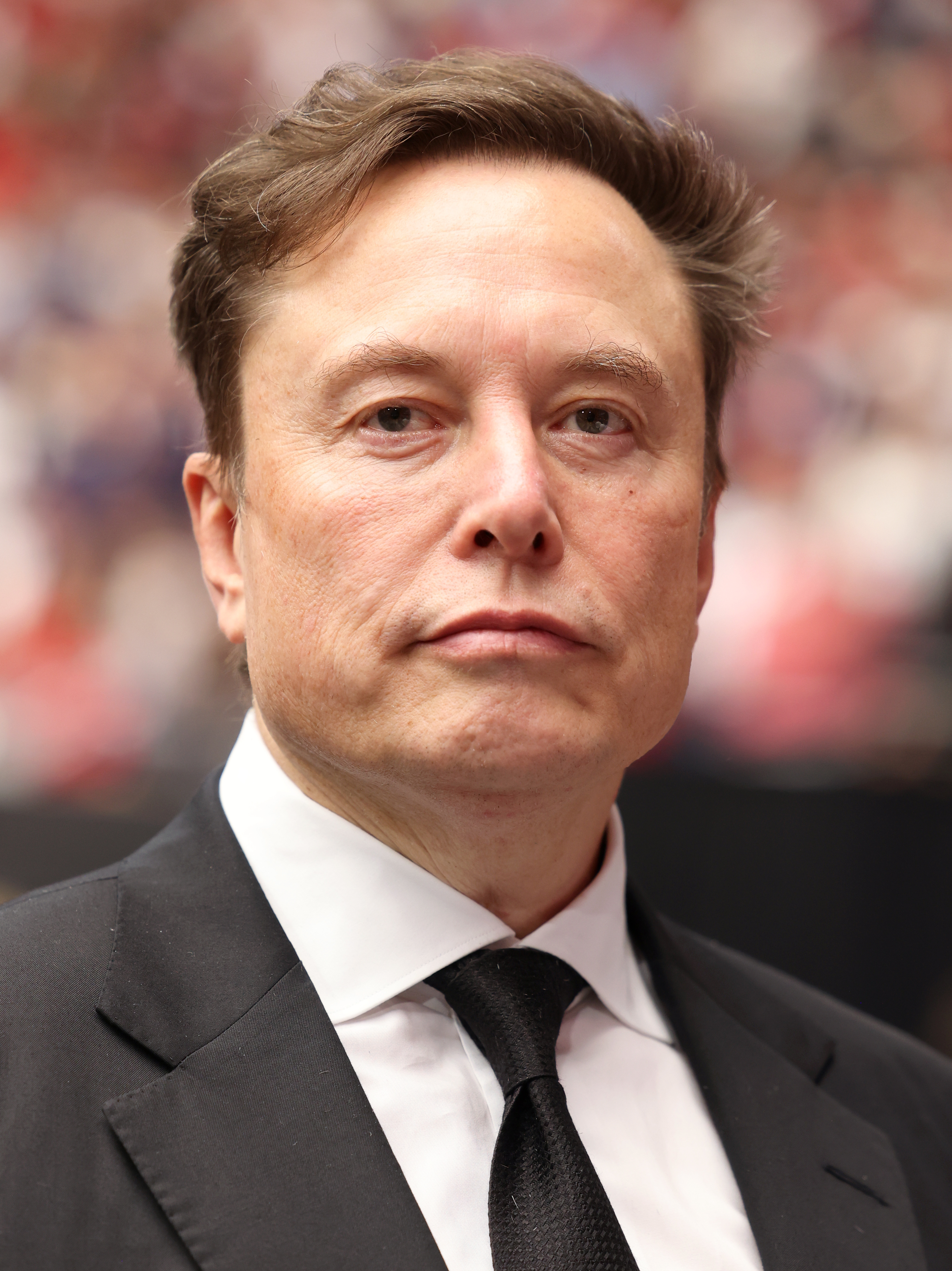
In 2026, Elon Musk became the only US-dollar trillionaire in history upon the initial public offering of his company SpaceX.

A trillionaire is a person whose net worth is at least one trillion units of a given currency, typically the US dollar due to its status as a world currency. The only person to reach trillionaire status in terms of US dollars is Elon Musk, who first reached trillionaire status upon the initial public offering of his company SpaceX in 2026. Musk's net worth is highly concentrated in SpaceX, which debuted at a record valuation of nearly US$2 trillion. Since then, SpaceX's volatile stock price has primarily influenced Musk's net worth, with its fluctuations causing him to frequently lose and regain trillionaire status. Several other currencies have had their own trillionaires, sometimes owing to hyperinflation.

== Etymology ==
The earliest evidence of the word trillionaire, according to the Oxford English Dictionary, is from a letter to the editor published in an 1861 issue of the Huddersfield Chronicle and West Yorkshire Advertiser.

== In US dollars ==
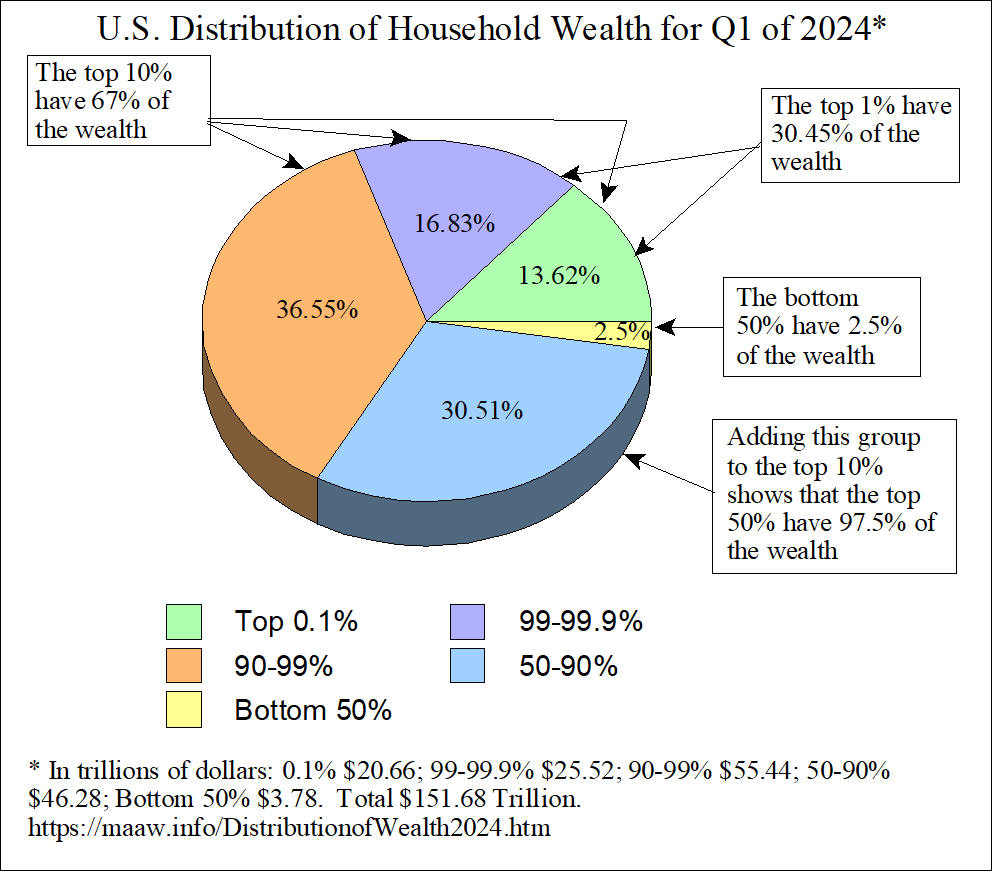
US distribution of household wealth for the first quarter of 2024. Federal Reserve data.

=== Predictions for the first trillionaire ===
In 1999, Evan L. Marcus of Wired provided four scenarios in which Microsoft founder Bill Gates becomes not only the first trillionaire in US dollars, but also the first quadrillionaire (having a net worth of one thousand trillions or one quadrillion). In 2005, astrophysicist Neil deGrasse Tyson also said that Gates would become the first trillionaire. In 2017, a report from international charity Oxfam predicted that the first trillionaire would emerge within 25 years, pointing to increasing global wealth inequality and individuals such as Gates.

In 2008, Peter Diamandis, founder of the Xprize foundation, predicted that the first trillionaire would be made in the space industry by asteroid mining. In 2015, Tyson predicted the same, as did US senator Ted Cruz in 2018. Musk said in 2003 that asteroid mining was "bogus", and has not publicly updated that view since then, and in 2018 Andrew Glester of Physics World questioned the feasibility of precious metal extraction as well as of the effect on prices that a sudden influx of a supply of precious metals might have.

Entrepreneur Mark Cuban predicted in 2017 that the first trillionaire would make their fortune from artificial intelligence.

A study by Approve, a platform for finance teams, predicted in 2022 that Musk would become the world's first trillionaire by 2024. The same study also predicted nine other individuals would become trillionaires after Musk: Gautam Adani in 2025, Zhang Yiming in 2026, Bernard Arnault in 2029, Mukesh Ambani in 2029, Jeff Bezos in 2030, Larry Page in 2032, Sergey Brin in 2032, Steve Ballmer in 2032, and Michael Dell in 2033.

A study by wealth-tracking service Informa Connect in 2024 predicted Musk would become a trillionaire in 2027, Adani in 2028, Prajogo Pangestu in 2028, Jensen Huang in 2028, Mark Zuckerberg in 2030, Arnault (and his family) in 2030, and Phil Knight (and his family) in 2030.

=== First trillionaire ===
On June 12, 2026, with the initial public offering of Musk's company SpaceX at a record valuation of nearly US$1.8 trillion, he became the only person whose net worth has exceeded $1 trillion. His ownership of 42% of SpaceX shares, combined with his multi-billion-dollar holdings in Tesla, Inc. and other companies, brought him over the threshold upon the IPO. His net worth reached an intraday peak of $1.45 trillion in the week after the IPO, but by late July 2026, a SpaceX stock collapse had reduced his net worth by $750 billion, the largest loss in history. By October 5, 2026, SpaceX stocks had rebounded sufficiently to restore Musk's trillionaire status. By October 21, he had fallen under the threshold.

==== Reactions ====
Net worth and 1-year growth of the top 16 US billionaires individually and together, and all US billionaires as a whole, as of June 16, 2026

Musk's status as the first US dollar trillionaire drew historical comparisons, acclaim, and criticism. The New York Times drew the connection between Musk and John D. Rockefeller, who became the first US dollar billionaire in 1916. Rockefeller's wealth was estimated at $900 million in 1913, which was 2.3% of the US gross domestic product (GDP); when Musk's wealth was $970 billion on June 11, 2026 due to the pricing of SpaceX at $135 per share, it was 3% of the US GDP. When Musk became a trillionaire, he was nearly four times as wealthy as the second richest person, Larry Page. Left-wing American political figures such as Elizabeth Warren and Zohran Mamdani used the milestone to call for the implementation of a wealth tax.

Economist Gabriel Zucman argued that extreme wealth will always lead to extreme power and threatens the very possibility of democracy. Columnist Jonah Goldberg argued that Musk was "creating wealth" rather than hoarding it, and that "no one was made poorer by Musk getting richer." In Reason, commentator John Stossel wrote that "consumers are better off when Musk makes money" and said he hoped the United States would have more trillionaires.

== In other currencies ==
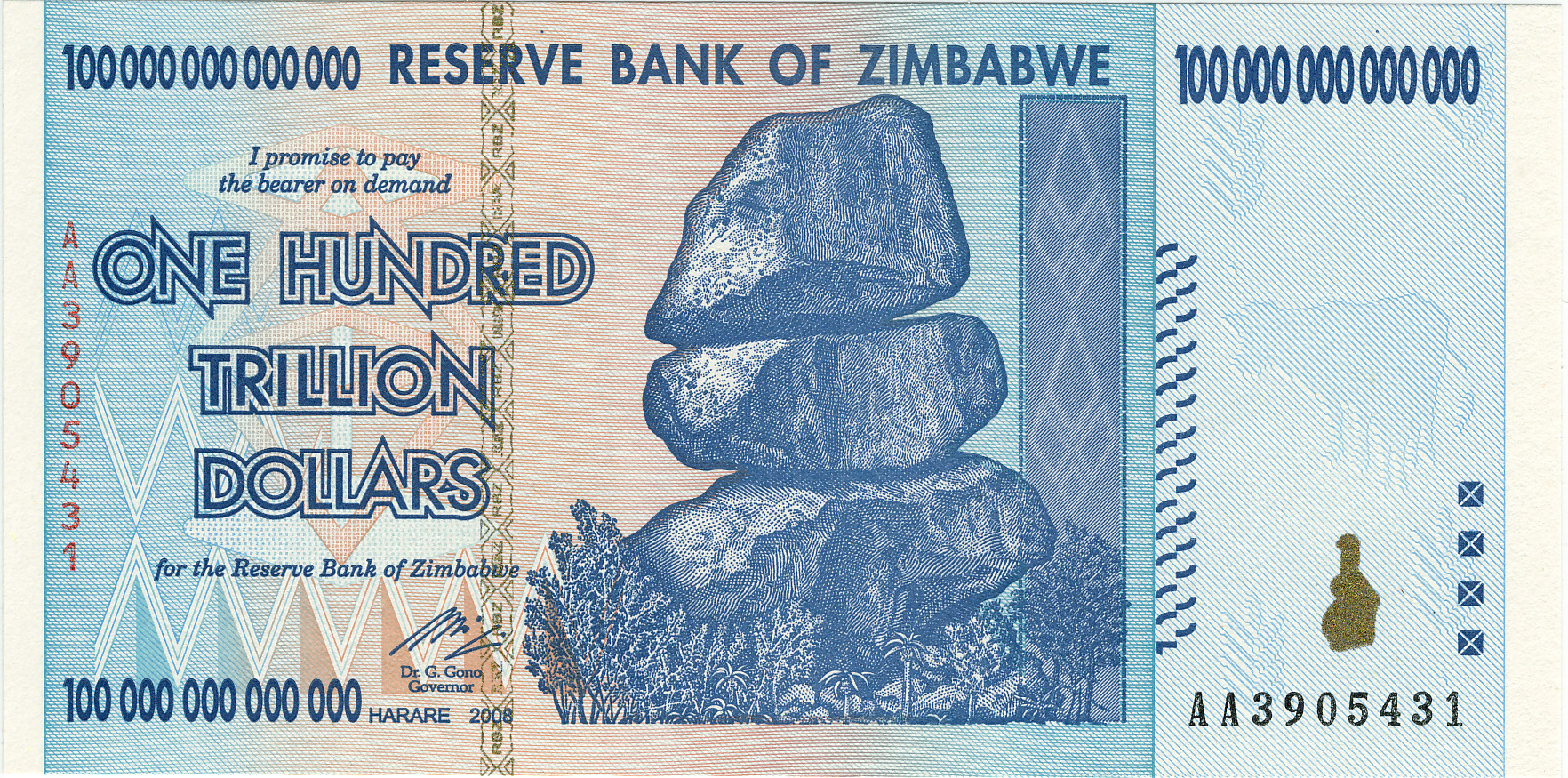
100 trillion Zimbabwean dollars, an example of hyperinflation

People have been considered trillionaires in other currencies, often due to hyperinflation, such as the Zimbabwean dollar in 2008.

The net worth of people outside the US is often calculated in their respective currencies, creating dong trillionaires, ruble trillionaires, peso trillionaires, yen trillionaires, and others.

== See also ==
- Billionaire
- Millionaire
- List of wealthiest families
- List of centibillionaires
- Inflation
