= List of universities by number of billionaire alumni =

Counting all degrees, Harvard University comes in first place in terms of the total number of billionaire alumni. The University of Pennsylvania comes in first if only bachelor's degrees are counted, according to the most recent 2022 Forbes report. Harvard also ranks first in the number of ultra-high net worth alumni with assets greater than $30 million. Harvard's total number of ultra-high net worth alumni is more than twice that of the next highest ranking institution, Stanford University. These figures have not been adjusted for the relative size of these institutions. The list is dominated by US universities, which account for all of the global Top 10 universities by number of billionaire alumni.

== Global top 10 universities by number of billionaire alumni per Forbes World’s Billionaires List 2025 ==
| Rank | University | Number |
|---|---|---|
| 1 | (United States) Harvard University | 127 |
| 2 | (United States) Stanford University | 93 |
| 3 | (United States) University of Pennsylvania | 62 |
| 4 | (United States) Columbia University | 40 |
| 5 | (United States) Massachusetts Institute of Technology | 39 |
| 6 | (United States) University of Southern California | 30 |
| 7 | (United States) Yale University | 24 |
| 8 | (United States) Cornell University | 21 |
| 9 | (United States) Princeton University | 20 |
| 10 | (United States) New York University | 20 |

== Global top 20 universities by number of ultra high net worth alumni (>$30 million) per Wealth-X 2019 ==
| Rank | University | Number | Combined wealth |
|---|---|---|---|
| 1 | (United States) Harvard University | 13,650 | $4.769 trillion |
| 2 | (United States) Stanford University | 5,580 | $2.899 trillion |
| 3 | (United States) University of Pennsylvania | 5,575 | $2.780 trillion |
| 4 | (United States) Columbia University | 3,925 | $1.501 trillion |
| 5 | (United States) New York University | 3,380 | $712 billion |
| 6 | (United States) Massachusetts Institute of Technology | 2,785 | $990 billion |
| 7 | (United Kingdom) University of Cambridge | 2,760 | $390 billion |
| 8 | (United States) Northwestern University | 2,725 | $389 billion |
| 9 | (United States) University of Southern California | 2,645 | $748 billion |
| 10 | (United States) University of Chicago | 2,405 | $707 billion |
| 11 | (United States) Yale University | 2,400 | $777 billion |
| 12 | (United Kingdom) University of Oxford | 2,290 | $349 billion |
| 13 | (United States) Cornell University | 2,245 | $483 billion |
| 14 | (United States) University of Texas at Austin | 2,195 | $463 billion |
| 15 | (United States) Princeton University | 2,180 | $1.126 trillion |
| 16 | (United States) University of Notre Dame | 2,085 | $179 billion |
| 17 | University of California, Los Angeles | 1,945 | $275 billion |
| 18 | (United States) University of Miami | 1,970 | $691 billion |
| 19 | (France) (Singapore) (United Arab Emirates) (United States) INSEAD | 1,965 | $356 billion |
| 20 | (United States) University of California, Berkeley | 1,385 | $260 billion (United States) |

== Global top 20 universities by number of ultra high net worth alumni (>$30 million) per Altrata 2024 ==
| Rank | University | Number |
|---|---|---|
| 1 | (United States) Harvard University | 17,660 |
| 2 | (United States) Stanford University | 7,972 |
| 3 | (United States) University of Pennsylvania | 6,017 |
| 4 | (United States) Columbia University | 5,528 |
| 5 | (United States) University of Southern California | 4,994 |
| 6 | (United States) New York University | 4,214 |
| 7 | (United States) Northwestern University | 4,354 |
| 8 | (United States) Massachusetts Institute of Technology | 4,089 |
| 9 | (United Kingdom) London School of Economics | 3,921 |
| 10 | (United States) Yale University | 3,654 |
| 11 | National University of Singapore | 3,653 |
| 12 | (United States) University of Chicago | 3,588 |
| 13 | (United States) University of Texas System | 3,407 |
| 14 | (United Kingdom) University of Oxford | 3,356 |
| 15 | (United States) Princeton University | 3,173 |
| 16 | (United States) Cornell University | 2,911 |
| 17 | (United States) University of California, Los Angeles | 2,906 |
| 18 | (United Kingdom) University of Cambridge | 2,849 |
| 19 | (United States) University of Notre Dame | 2,804 |
| 20 | (France) (Singapore) (United Arab Emirates) (United States) INSEAD | 2,625 |

== Global top 20 universities by number of billionaire undergraduate alumni per Wealth-X 2022 ==
| Rank | University | Number |
|---|---|---|
| 1 | (United States) University of Pennsylvania | 25 |
| 2 | (United States) Harvard University | 22 |
| 3 | (United States) Yale University | 20 |
| 4 | (United States) University of Southern California | 20 |
| 5 | (United States) Princeton University | 14 |
| 5 | (United States) Cornell University | 14 |
| 5 | (United States) Stanford University | 14 |
| 8 | (United States) University of California, Berkeley | 12 |
| 8 | (India) University of Mumbai | 12 |
| 10 | (United Kingdom) London School of Economics and Political Science | 12 |
| 10 | (Russia) Moscow State University | 11 |
| 12 | (United States) Dartmouth College | 10 |
| 12 | (United States) University of Michigan | 10 |
| 12 | (United States) University of Texas System | 10 |
| 15 | (United States) Duke University | 9 |
| 15 | (United States) New York University | 9 |
| 17 | (United States) Columbia University | 8 |
| 17 | (United States) Brown University | 8 |
| 19 | (United States) Massachusetts Institute of Technology | 7 |
| 20 | (Switzerland) ETH Zurich | 6 |

== Global top 11 universities by number of undergraduate billionaire alumni per Forbes 2021 ==
| Rank | University | Number | Total Net Worth |
|---|---|---|---|
| 1 | (United States) University of Pennsylvania | 29 | $1,284.8 billion |
| 2 | (United States) Harvard University | 28 | $207 billion |
| 2 | (United States) Stanford University | 28 | $124.4 billion |
| 4 | (United States) Yale University | 21 | $140.8 billion |
| 5 | (United States) University of Southern California | 21 | $128.5 billion |
| 6 | (India) University of Mumbai | 20 | $162.8 billion |
| 7 | (United States) Cornell University | 18 | $65.1 billion |
| 8 | (United States) New York University | 16 | $97.5 billion |
| 9 | (United States) Massachusetts Institute of Technology | 14 | $104 billion |
| 10 | (United States) Columbia University | 11 | $40.9 billion |
| 11 | (United States) Princeton University | 11 | $288.4 billion |
| 12 | (United States) University of California, Berkeley | 11 | $82.6 billion |

== Top 12 US universities by number of undergraduate alumni† on 2023 Forbes 400 list ==
| Rank | University | Number |
|---|---|---|
| 1 | (United States) Harvard University | 15 |
| 2 | (United States) University of Pennsylvania | 14 |
| 3 | (United States) Stanford University | 12 |
| 3 | (United States) Yale University | 12 |
| 5 | (United States) University of Southern California | 11 |
| 6 | (United States) Cornell University | 9 |
| 7 | (United States) Princeton University | 8 |
| 8 | (United States) Columbia University | 7 |
| 8 | (United States) University of Michigan | 7 |
| 10 | (United States) Duke University | 6 |
| 10 | (United States) University of California, Berkeley | 6 |
| 10 | (United States) Dartmouth College | 6 |

== Top 11 US universities by number of undergraduate alumni† on 2024 Forbes 400 list ==
| Rank | University | Number |
|---|---|---|
| 1 | (United States) University of Pennsylvania | 17 |
| 2 | (United States) Harvard University | 15 |
| 2 | (United States) Yale University | 11 |
| 4 | (United States) University of Southern California | 11 |
| 5 | (United States) Stanford University | 9 |
| 6 | (United States) Princeton University | 8 |
| 7 | (United States) Cornell University | 7 |
| 7 | (United States) Columbia University | 7 |
| 7 | (United States) University of Michigan | 7 |
| 10 | (United States) Dartmouth College | 6 |
| 10 | (United States) New York University | 6 |

† Includes only those alumni who received undergraduate degrees

== See also ==
- List of countries by number of billionaires
- List of cities by number of billionaires
