= List of countries by number of billionaires =

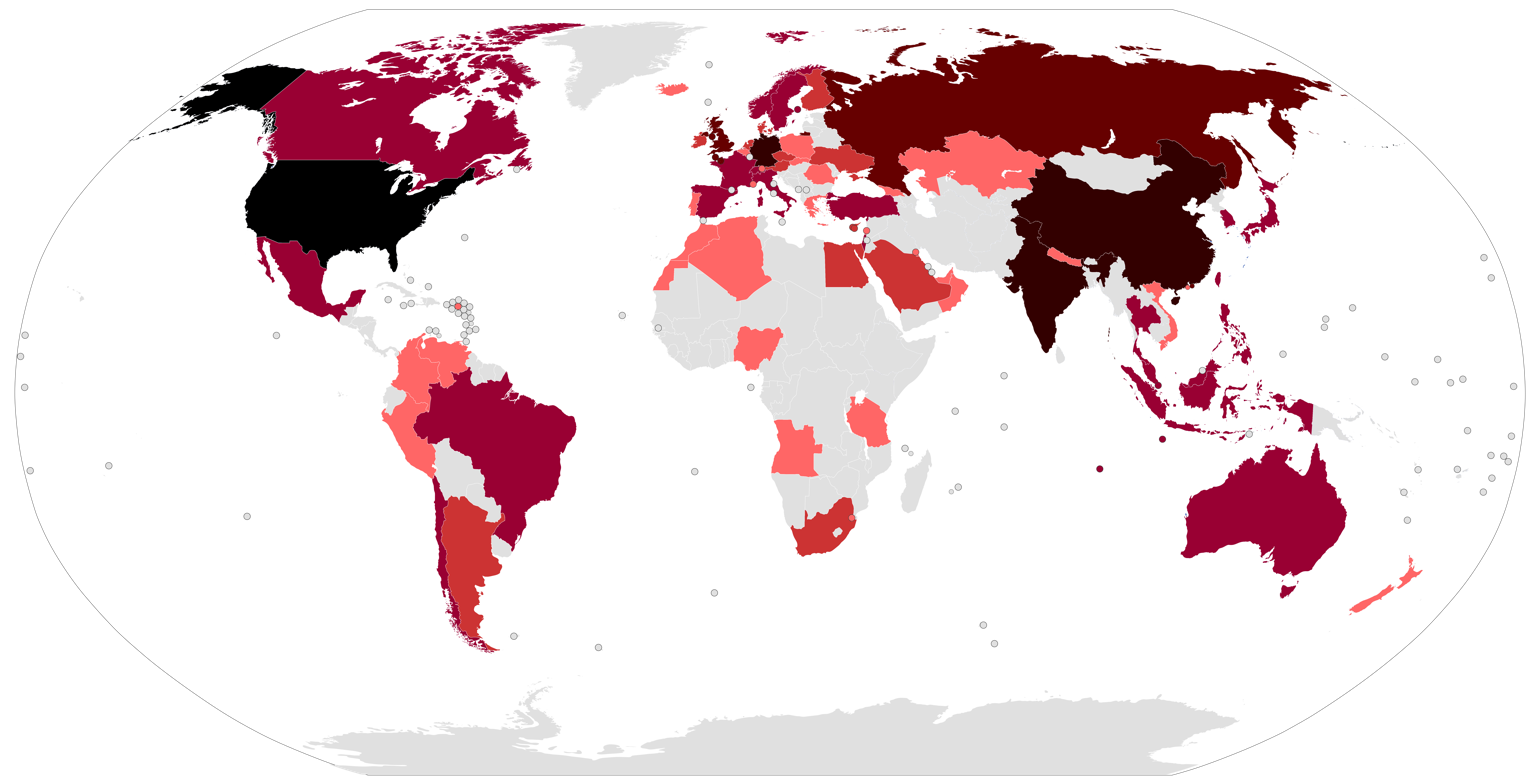
Countries by their number of billionaires by net worth (USD) in 2017: No data or 0 1–5 6–10 11–50 / 51–100 101–500 >500

This is a list of countries by their number of billionaire residents, based on annual assessments of the net worth in United States Dollars of wealthy individuals worldwide.

== Forbes ==
Billionaires. Per Forbes (March 2026)
Rank	Country/Territory	Billionaires		Change	Rate	% of World (2026)
Rank	Country/Territory	2026	2025	Change	Rate	% of World (2026)
	World	3,428	3,028	+400	0.343	100%
1	United States	989	902	+87	2.820	28.85%
2	China	539	450	+89	0.288	15.72%
3	India	229	205	+24	0.144	6.68%
4	Germany	212	171	+41	2.538	6.18%
5	Russia	147	140	+7	0.821	4.29%
6	Italy	89	74	+15	1.509	2.60%
7	Canada	82	76	+6	1.643	2.39%
8	Hong Kong	71	66	+5	8.936	2.07%
9	Brazil	70	56	+14	0.340	2.04%
10	Taiwan	66	54	+12	2.178	1.93%
11	United Kingdom	56	55	+1	0.814	1.63%
12	Singapore	55	49	+6	6.591	1.60%
13	France	51	52	-1	0.775	1.49%
14	Sweden	50	45	+5	4.075	1.46%
15	South Korea	49	36	+13	0.702	1.43%
16	Australia	47	47	0	1.790	1.37%
17	Switzerland	45	42	+3	4.591	1.31%
18	Israel	42	41	+1	3.649	1.23%
19	Japan	41	41	0	0.331	1.20%
20	Spain	34	34	0	0.597	0.99%
21	Indonesia	33	33	0	0.125	0.96%
22	Turkey	32	27	+5	0.316	0.93%
23	Thailand	25	26	-1	0.381	0.73%
24	Mexico	22	22	0	0.170	0.64%
25	Malaysia	19	17	+2	0.509	0.55%
26	Norway	17	12	+5	2.162	0.50%
27	Greece	16	10	+6	0.960	0.47%
28	Philippines	15	16	-1	0.142	0.44%
28	Saudi Arabia	15	0	+15	0.405	0.44%
30	Netherlands	13	14	-1	0.780	0.38%
31	Czech Republic	11	11	0	1.011	0.32%
31	Ireland	11	11	0	2.083	0.32%
31	Belgium	11	10	+1	0.847	0.32%
34	Cyprus	10	10	0	10.892	0.29%
34	Poland	10	8	+2	0.213	0.29%
36	Austria	9	9	0	0.983	0.26%
36	Denmark	9	9	0	1.510	0.26%
38	Finland	7	7	0	1.256	0.20%
38	South Africa	7	6	+1	0.097	0.20%
38	Ukraine	7	5	+2	0.136	0.20%
41	Chile	6	6	0	0.301	0.18%
41	Kazakhstan	6	6	0	0.299	0.18%
41	Lebanon	6	6	0	1.093	0.18%
41	Romania	6	6	0	0.315	0.18%
41	United Arab Emirates	6	4	+2	0.431	0.18%
46	Vietnam	5	6	-1	0.060	0.15%
46	Egypt	5	5	0	0.048	0.15%
46	Argentina	5	5	0	0.107	0.15%
46	New Zealand	5	4	+1	0.754	0.15%
50	Hungary	4	5	-1	0.521	0.12%
50	Colombia	4	4	0	0.076	0.12%
50	Nigeria	4	4	0	0.018	0.12%
53	Morocco	3	2	+1	0.054	0.09%
54	Monaco	2	3	-1	76.825	0.06%
54	Bulgaria	2	2	0	0.310	0.06%
54	Qatar	2	2	0	0.753	0.06%
54	Oman	2	2	0	0.391	0.06%
54	Slovakia	2	2	0	0.369	0.06%
54	Georgia	2	2	0	0.535	0.06%
54	Estonia	2	1	+1	0.732	0.06%
54	Nepal	2	1	+1	0.034	0.06%
61	Portugal	1	1	0	0.096	0.03%
61	Barbados	1	1	0	3.734	0.03%
61	Venezuela	1	1	0	0.035	0.03%
61	Algeria	1	1	0	0.022	0.03%
61	Eswatini	1	1	0	0.817	0.03%
61	Guernsey	1	1	0	15.602	0.03%
61	Iceland	1	1	0	2.519	0.03%
61	Liechtenstein	1	1	0	25.174	0.03%
61	Tanzania	1	1	0	0.016	0.03%
61	Zimbabwe	1	1	0	0.066	0.03%
61	Armenia	1	1	0	0.335	0.03%
61	Belize	1	1	0	2.265	0.03%
61	Croatia	1	1	0	0.259	0.03%
61	Luxembourg	1	1	0	1.513	0.03%
61	Albania	1	0	+1	0.355	0.03%

== Hurun Global Rich List ==
Billionaires. Per Hurun Global Rich List (2026)
Rank	Country/Territory	Number of billionaires	Major cities of residents	% of World
1	China	1,110	Shanghai, Beijing, Shenzhen, Hong Kong, Hangzhou, Guangzhou, Ningbo	27.61%
2	United States	1,000	New York City, San Francisco, Los Angeles, Palm Beach, Dallas	24.87%
3	India	308	Mumbai, Delhi, Bengaluru, Kolkata	7.66%
4	Germany	171		4.25%
5	United Kingdom	150	London	3.73%
6	Switzerland	114		2.87%
7	Russia	105	Moscow	2.61%
8	Brazil	77	São Paulo	1.92%
9	Canada	75	Toronto, Vancouver, Montreal	1.87%
10	Italy	73	Milan	1.82%
11	France	71	Paris	1.77%
12	Australia	61		1.52%
13	Singapore	59	Singapore	1.47%
14	Indonesia	44	Jakarta	1.09%
15	Japan	42	Tokyo	1.04%
16	Thailand	40	Bangkok	0.99%
17	South Korea	37	Seoul	0.92%
18	Sweden	35	Stockholm	0.87%
18	Turkey	35	Istanbul	0.87%
20	Spain	34		0.86%
21	Israel	31	Tel Aviv	0.77%
22	United Arab Emirates	28	Dubai	0.70%
23	Mexico	27		0.67%
23	Monaco	27		0.67%
25	Saudi Arabia	17		0.42%
26	Philippines	16		0.40%
26	Malaysia	16		0.40%
28	Chile	15		0.37%
28	Denmark	15		0.37%
30	Austria	14		0.35%

== See also ==
- List of cities by number of billionaires
- List of countries by number of millionaires
- List of countries by share of income of the richest one percent
- The World's Billionaires
- Millionaire
- List of wealthiest families
