= Millionaire =

Person with wealth beyond a certain value

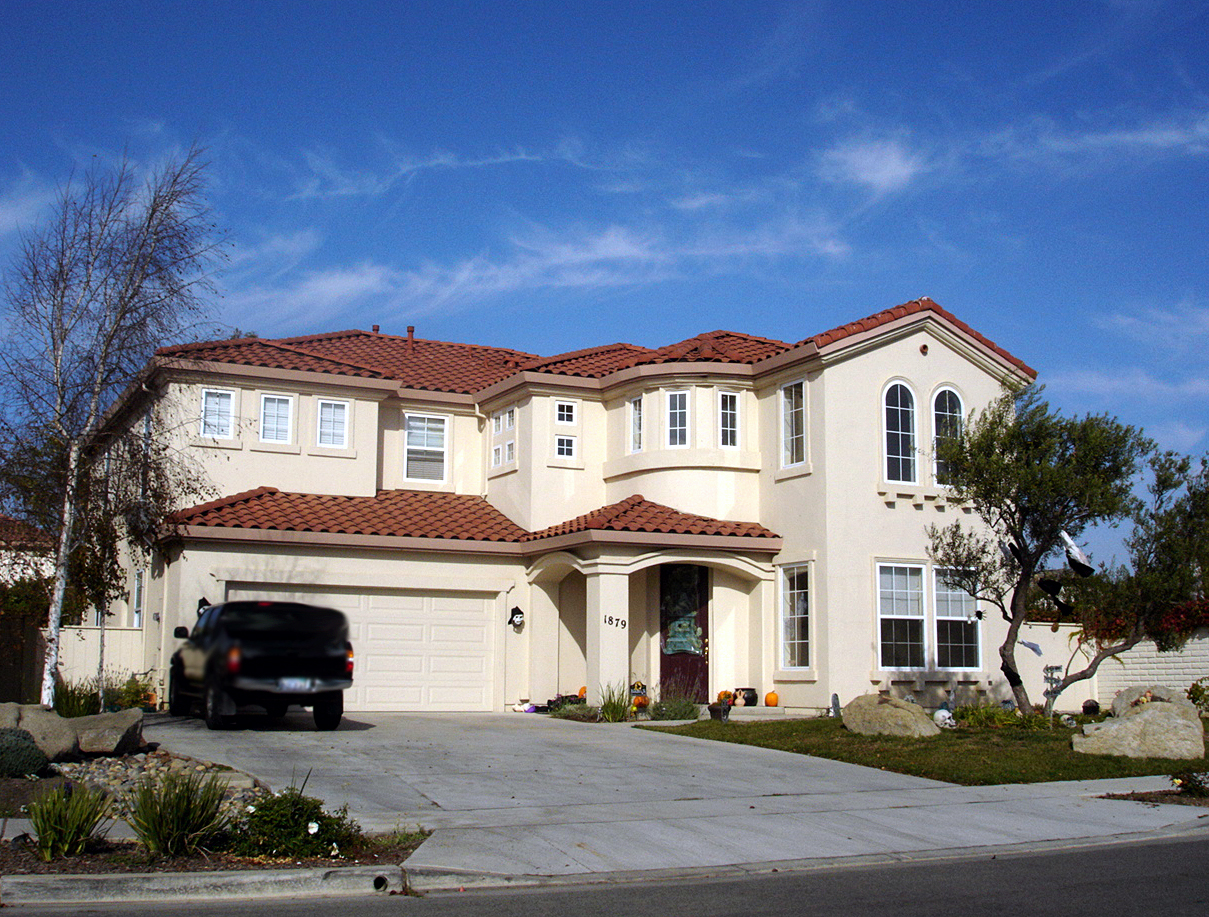
A large suburban home valued at roughly $1,000,000 (2006) in Salinas, California, shown for scale of purchasing power

A millionaire is an individual whose net worth or wealth is equal to or exceeds one million units of currency. Depending on the currency, a certain level of prestige is associated with being a millionaire. Many national currencies have, or have had at various times, a low unit value, in many cases due to past inflation. It is much easier and less significant to be a millionaire in those currencies, thus a millionaire in the local currency of Hong Kong or Taiwan, for example, may be merely of average wealth, or perhaps less wealthy than average. A millionaire in Zimbabwe in 2007 could have been extremely poor. Because of this, the term "millionaire" generally refers to those whose assets total at least one million units of a high-value currency, such as the United States dollar, euro, or pound sterling. Even in these currencies, the prestige associated with being a millionaire has decreased over time, due to inflation.

At the end of 2011, there were around 5.1 million high-net-worth individuals (HNWIs) in the United States, while at the same time there were 11 million millionaires in a total of 3.5 million millionaire households, including those 5.1 million HNWIs. In countries that use the short scale number naming system, a billionaire has a net worth of at least a thousand times a million units of currency, a centibillionaire has a net worth of at least a hundred thousand times a million units of currency, and a trillionaire has a net worth of at least a million times a million units of currency.

== Terminology ==
The word "millionaire" was apparently coined in French in 1719 to describe speculators in the Mississippi Bubble who earned millions of livres in weeks before the bubble burst. At the time, this was an immense fortune, when typical wages were on the order of 100 to 2000 livres per year.

The standard French spelling is now millionnaire, though it could in the 18th century be spelled with a single n. The word is recorded in English in an article in The Times in 1795. Earlier English writers also mention the French word, including Sir William Mildmay in 1764. The anglicisation millionary was used in 1786 by Thomas Jefferson while serving as Minister to France; he wrote: "The poorest labourer stood on equal ground with the wealthiest Millionary".

== Influence ==
While millionaires constitute only a small percentage of the population, they hold substantial control over economic resources, with the most powerful and prominent individuals usually ranking among them. The total amount of money held by millionaires can equal the amount of money held by a far higher number of poor people. The Gini coefficient, and other measures in economics, estimated for each country, are useful for determining how many of the poorest people have the equivalent total wealth of the few richest in the country. Forbes and Fortune magazines maintain lists of people based on their net worth and are generally considered authorities on the subject. Forbes listed 1,645 dollar billionaires in 2014, with an aggregate net worth of $6.4 trillion, an increase from $5.4 trillion the previous year (see US-dollar billionaires in the world).

According to a report by Hurun, a market research firm based in China, the global billionaire population stood at 3,381 in 2022. Sixteen percent of millionaires inherited their fortunes. Forty-seven percent of millionaires are business owners. Twenty-three percent of the world's millionaires got that way through paid work, consisting mostly of skilled professionals or managers. Millionaires are, on average, 61-years-old with $3.05 million in assets.

== Historical worth ==
Depending on how it is calculated, a million US dollars in 1900 is equivalent to $38.7 million (in 2025):

- $24.8 million using the consumer price index,
- $61.4 million using the gold price

Thus one would need to have almost thirty million dollars today to have the purchasing power of a US millionaire in 1900, or more than 100 million dollars to have the same impact on the US economy.

== Multimillionaire ==
Dated ways of describing someone worth n millions are "n-fold millionaire" and "millionaire n times over". Still commonly used is multimillionaire, which refers to individuals with net assets of 2 million or more of a currency. Worldwide, there were approximately 584,000 people who have net assets equivalent to US$10M+ in 2017. Roughly 1.5% of US$ millionaires are "ultra-high-net-worth individuals" (ultra-HNWIs), defined as those with a net worth or wealth of $30 million or more. There are approximately 226,000 ultra-HNWIs in the world in 2017, according to Wealth-X. The rising prevalence of people possessing ever increasing quantities of wealth has given rise to additional terms to further differentiate millionaires. Individuals with net assets of 100 million or more of a currency are commonly termed centimillionaires, or more rarely hectomillionaires.

John Jacob Astor (1763–1848) is regarded as the first US-dollar multimillionaire. At the time of his death, he was worth $20–30 million, equivalent to approximately 1% of US GDP.

== Global cities with the most super-wealthy millionaires per capita ==
According to wealth research group Wealth-X that released its latest UHNW Cities report, showing the residential footprint of the world's top ultra-high net worth (UHNW) individual cities. Excluding Monaco – which has very high UHNWI density – Geneva has the highest density of super-wealthy people per capita in the world. The city is known as the most compact metropolitan area, and also enjoys a concentration of affluence. Singapore has the second-highest concentration, followed by San Jose, the center of Silicon Valley, and the largest city in Northern California. While New York City leads in terms of overall UHNW footprint, London has a similar number of UHNW "second homers" despite a considerably smaller population. Paris features as the second-highest European city, after London, Wealth-X said. Among suburbs and smaller towns, Beverly Hills has the highest overall number of UHNW residents, and Aspen has the highest concentration on a per capita basis, the report showed. Ultra-high net worth individuals are defined by Wealth-X as those whose total net worth is higher than $30 million (R400 million).

== Number of millionaires ==
The following are lists of regions, countries, and cities by the number of millionaires by net worth (in US dollars) based on an annual assessment of wealth and assets compiled and published by the Swiss bank Credit Suisse. According to estimates, in the middle of 2021, there were 56 million people worldwide whose assets exceeded one million US dollars, of whom nearly 40% lived in the United States.

=== By region ===
Numbers of US dollar millionaires by world region per Credit Suisse (2022)
Rank	Region	Numbers (in thousands)	Percentage of world total numbers	As percentage of total adult population
-	World	62,489	100.0	1.1
1	Northern America	26,778	41.9	9.5
2	Asia-Pacific	17,741	28.4	0.8
3	Europe	16,696	26.7	2.8
4	Latin America	915	1.5	0.2
5	Africa	352	0.6	0.1

== Disparity in United States ==
There is a wide disparity in the estimates of the number of millionaires residing in the United States. A quarterly report prepared by the Economist Intelligence Unit on behalf of Barclays Wealth in 2007 estimated that there were 16.6 million millionaires in the US. At the end of 2011, there were around 5.1 million HNWIs in the US, while at the same time, there were 11 million millionaires in a total of 3.5 million millionaire households, including those 5.1 million HNWIs.

According to TNS Financial Services, as reported by CNN Money, 2 million households in the US alone had a net worth of at least $1 million excluding primary residences in 2005. According to TNS, in mid-2006 the number of millionaire US households was 9.3 million, with an increase of half a million since 2005. The study found that half of all millionaire households in the US were headed by retirees. In 2004 the United States saw a "33 percent increase over the 6.2 million households that met that criteria [sic] in 2003", fueled largely by the country's real estate boom.

A report by Capgemini for Merrill Lynch on the other hand stated that in 2007 there were approximately 3,028,000 households in the United States who held at least US$1 million in financial assets, excluding collectibles, consumables, consumer durables and primary residences. According to TNS Financial Services, Los Angeles County, California, had the highest number of millionaires, totalling over 262,800 households in mid-2006.

Top 10 U.S. counties by number of millionaires (2009)
County	State	Metro area	Number of millionaire households
Los Angeles County	California	Los Angeles	268,138
Cook County	Illinois	Chicago	171,118
Orange County	California	Los Angeles	116,157
Maricopa County	Arizona	Phoenix	113,414
San Diego County	California	San Diego	102,138
Harris County	Texas	Houston	99,504
Nassau County	New York	New York	79,704
Santa Clara County	California	San Francisco	74,824
Palm Beach County	Florida	Miami	71,221
King County	Washington	Seattle	68,390

== See also ==
- Aggregate demand
- Business oligarch
- Distribution of wealth
- Upper middle class
- Upper class
- Six figure income
- Wealth concentration
- Who Wants to Be a Millionaire? (game show)
- The Millionaire Next Door (book)
- Moscow Millionaire Fair
- Pierre Lorillard II (first American to be designated a "millionaire")
- John Jacob Astor (first American to be designated "multimillionaire")
- List of African millionaires
- Lists of billionaires
- Sunday Times Rich List
