= List of countries by inequality-adjusted income =

Wealth share of richest 1%

This is a list of countries by inequality-adjusted income, as defined and measured by the United Nations Development Programme (UNDP). The income index is one component of the Human Development Index (HDI), but is also used separately.

Adjusting income for inequality based on the Gini coefficient was first proposed by Amartya Sen in 1976. The UN first applied the adjustment to income data in 1993, before it was later expanded to the general HDI.

Inequality-adjusted income index and income share of the top 1%: (based on UNDP data as of 2021).
Country	Inequality-adjusted income index	Income share of the top 1%
Ireland	0.877	11.8
Denmark	0.870	12.9
Norway	0.866	8.9
Iceland	0.864	8.8
Belgium	0.848	8.6
Netherlands	0.842	6.9
Finland	0.839	10.9
Luxembourg	0.833	10.4
Germany	0.833	12.8
Switzerland	0.830	11.5
Sweden	0.830	10.5
Slovenia	0.829	8.0
Czech Republic	0.821	10.0
Austria	0.808	10.1
France	0.797	9.8
Slovakia	0.787	7.0
Cyprus	0.781	11.5
Malta	0.776	9.1
Australia	0.776	11.3
South Korea	0.773	14.7
Poland	0.770	14.9
Canada	0.770	13.9
New Zealand	0.768	11.9
Hungary	0.767	12.3
Estonia	0.763	11.8
Japan	0.761	13.1
United Kingdom	0.758	12.7
United States	0.751	19.1
Croatia	0.751	10.2
Singapore	0.750	14.2
Lithuania	0.744	11.0
Kazakhstan	0.742	15.4
Portugal	0.741	9.6
Spain	0.725	12.4
Italy	0.724	8.7
Hong Kong	0.724	17.9
Latvia	0.722	9.1
Belarus	0.715	9.9
Greece	0.714	10.8
Israel	0.700	16.6
Russia	0.697	21.0
Azerbaijan	0.683	14.3
Romania	0.682	14.4
Moldova	0.677	9.8
Oman	0.676	19.6
Ukraine	0.675	9.5
Montenegro	0.670	9.7
Turkey	0.667	18.8
Mauritius	0.667	15.9
Albania	0.649	8.9
Serbia	0.647	10.9
Bulgaria	0.633	18.3
Thailand	0.630	17.8
Algeria	0.626	9.9
Uruguay	0.619	14.7
North Macedonia	0.619	6.5
Guyana	0.613	20.8
Armenia	0.609	15.4
Iraq	0.607	20.7
Bosnia and Herzegovina	0.606	8.9
Chile	0.596	27.1
Seychelles	0.593	20.6
Iran	0.590	18.2
Mongolia	0.585	16.5
Gabon	0.583	11.0
Dominican Republic	0.583	20.8
Tunisia	0.581	10.9
Argentina	0.580	21.7
Indonesia	0.572	18.3
Jordan	0.570	17.5
Sri Lanka	0.567	20.6
China	0.567	14.0
Georgia	0.566	21.1
Maldives	0.565	13.3
Vietnam	0.563	16.2
Mexico	0.550	28.4
Bhutan	0.550	14.2
Turkmenistan	0.543	19.9
Panama	0.536	20.8
Peru	0.535	21.2
Costa Rica	0.533	19.1
Saint Lucia	0.525	—N/a
Tonga	0.522	—N/a
Laos	0.521	20.1
El Salvador	0.517	14.5
India	0.510	21.7
Paraguay	0.506	20.8
Bangladesh	0.504	16.3
Morocco	0.502	15.1
Kyrgyzstan	0.497	18.4
Timor-Leste	0.496	15.7
Tajikistan	0.493	14.9
Mauritania	0.490	10.8
Philippines	0.488	16.9
Bolivia	0.486	20.8
Tuvalu	0.483	—N/a
Ecuador	0.483	13.7
Barbados	0.483	—N/a
Cambodia	0.480	18.6
Pakistan	0.479	16.8
Guatemala	0.475	20.8
Samoa	0.469	—N/a
Colombia	0.468	19.9
Ghana	0.464	15.2
Venezuela	0.462	20.8
Nepal	0.462	13.9
Jamaica	0.461	20.8
Egypt	0.457	19.9
Kiribati	0.451	—N/a
Brazil	0.440	25.7
Ivory Coast	0.436	21.0
Palestine	0.432	17.9
Angola	0.430	26.0
Djibouti	0.428	15.9
Nicaragua	0.422	20.8
Nigeria	0.421	11.6
Ethiopia	0.420	13.8
Vanuatu	0.416	—N/a
São Tomé and Príncipe	0.412	9.0
Eswatini	0.407	19.3
Senegal	0.406	13.2
Federated States of Micronesia	0.401	—N/a
Guinea	0.399	12.5
Papua New Guinea	0.396	16.7
Zimbabwe	0.392	21.1
Suriname	0.390	20.8
Honduras	0.390	20.8
Belize	0.389	20.8
Mali	0.386	9.7
Tanzania	0.385	18.2
Kenya	0.384	15.2
Gambia	0.384	13.6
Burkina Faso	0.381	14.6
Benin	0.363	17.5
Sudan	0.362	15.4
Cameroon	0.352	15.9
Lesotho	0.351	14.5
Congo	0.351	20.5
Uganda	0.350	17.1
Togo	0.340	13.9
Rwanda	0.340	19.9
Sierra Leone	0.337	15.0
Niger	0.318	11.6
South Africa	0.316	21.9
Namibia	0.313	21.6
Liberia	0.310	12.2
Yemen	0.304	24.7
Madagascar	0.295	15.2
Chad	0.290	15.7
Zambia	0.289	23.2
Malawi	0.279	28.0
Guinea-Bissau	0.277	17.1
Mozambique	0.269	31.1
Somalia	0.265	12.4
DR Congo	0.260	14.6
Haiti	0.251	20.8
Burundi	0.238	14.7
Comoros	0.229	14.2
South Sudan	0.209	15.5
Central African Republic	0.174	31.0
Afghanistan	—N/a	15.3
Bahamas	—N/a	20.8
Bahrain	—N/a	25.1
Botswana	—N/a	22.7
Brunei	—N/a	13.6
Cape Verde	—N/a	13.9
Cuba	—N/a	16.7
Equatorial Guinea	—N/a	17.6
Eritrea	—N/a	13.8
Kuwait	—N/a	19.4
Lebanon	—N/a	21.0
Libya	—N/a	13.6
Malaysia	—N/a	14.9
Myanmar	—N/a	17.1
North Korea	—N/a	14.8
Qatar	—N/a	23.6
Saudi Arabia	—N/a	21.0
Syria	—N/a	21.2
Trinidad and Tobago	—N/a	20.8
United Arab Emirates	—N/a	15.8
Uzbekistan	—N/a	16.9

== See also ==
- List of countries by income inequality
